= Kii-Kamiya Station =

Railway station in Kōya, Wakayama Prefecture, Japan

Kii-Kamiya Station 紀伊神谷駅
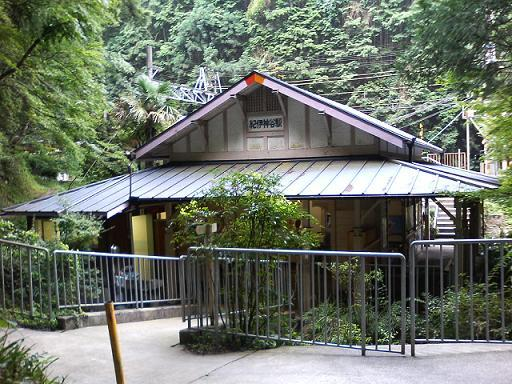
- Kii-Kamiya Station, August 2005

General information
- Location: Kamiya, Kōya-chō, Ito-gun, Wakayama-ken 648-0262; Japan
- Coordinates: 34°14′34.1″N 135°34′16.05″E
- Operator: Nankai Electric Railway
- Line: Kōya Line
- Distance: 63.0 km (39.1 miles) from Shiomibashi
- Platforms: 1 island platform

Other information
- Status: Unstaffed
- Station code: NK85
- Website: Official website

History
- Opened: 18 June 1928
- Former names: Kamiya (until 1930)

Passengers
- FY2019: 18 daily

Services
Preceding station	Nankai Electric Railway	Following station
Kii-Hosokawa towards Namba	Kōya Line Local Express Rapid Express	Gokurakubashi Terminus
Location
- Location within Wakayama Prefecture Location within Japan

Kii-Kamiya Station (紀伊神谷駅, Kii-Kamiya-eki) is a passenger railway station in the town of Kōya, Ito District, Wakayama Prefecture, Japan, operated by the private railway company Nankai Electric Railway.

== Lines ==
Kii-Kamiya Station is served by the Nankai Kōya Line, and is located 63.0 kilometers from the terminus of the line at Shiomibashi Station and 62.3 kilometers from Namba Station.

== Station layout ==
The station consists of one island platform connected to the station building by a level crossing. The station is unattended.

=== Platforms ===
1	■ Nankai Kōya Line	for Kōyasan
2	■ Nankai Kōya Line	for Hashimoto and Nanba

== History ==
Kii-Kamiya Station opened on June 18, 1928 as Kamiya Station (神谷駅). It was renamed to its present name on March 1, 1930.

== Passenger statistics ==
In fiscal 2019, the station was used by an average of 13 passengers daily (boarding passengers only).

== Surrounding area ==
The station is located in an isolated rural area.

== See also ==
- List of railway stations in Japan
