= Kii-Shimizu Station =

Railway station in Hashimoto, Wakayama Prefecture, Japan

Kii-Shimizu Station 紀伊清水駅
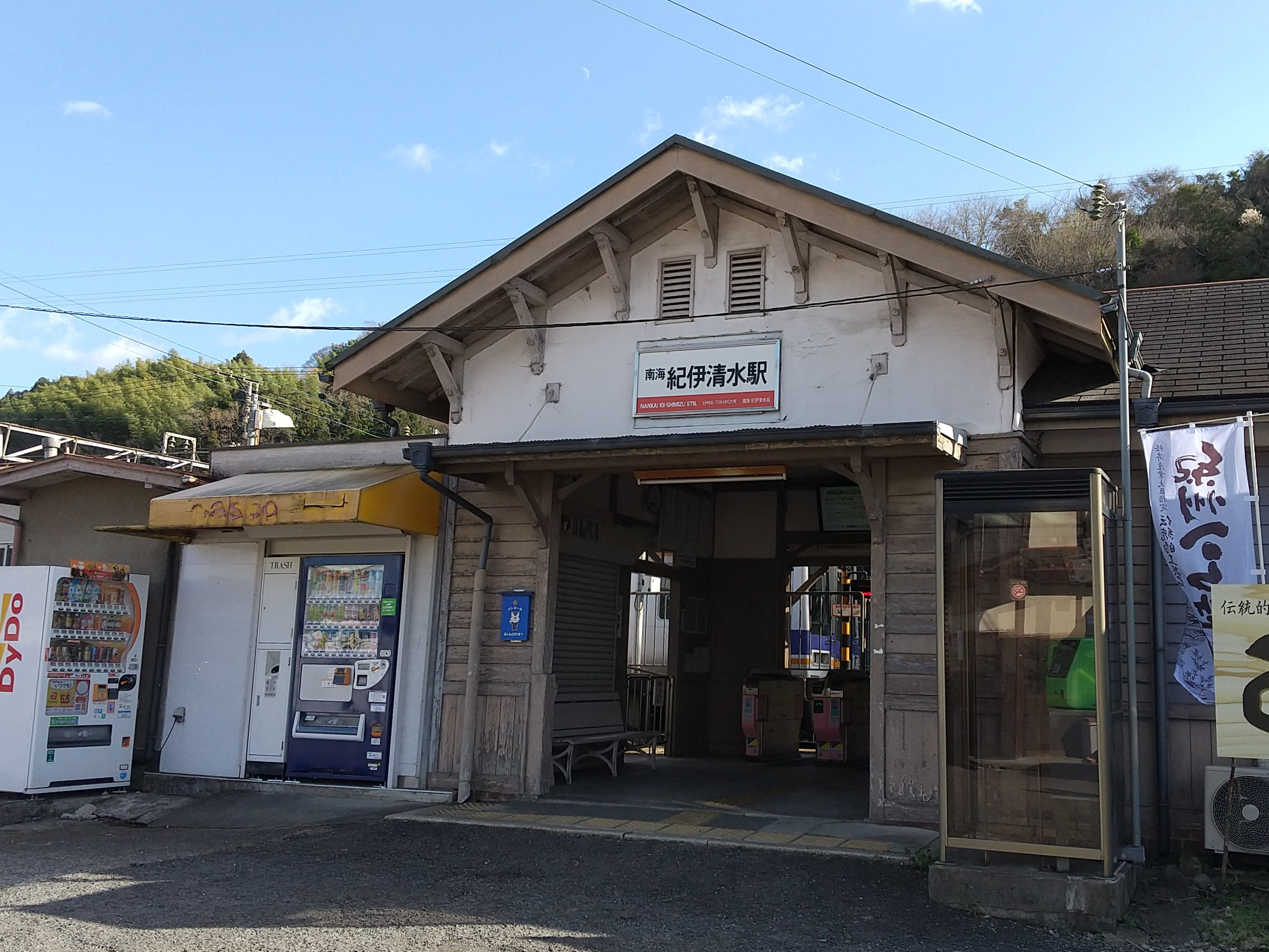
- Kii-Shimizu Station in December 2022

General information
- Location: 558-4, Shimizu, Hashimoto-shi, Wakayama-ken 648-0041; Japan
- Coordinates: 34°18′26.4″N 135°36′15.35″E
- Operator: Nankai Electric Railway
- Line: Kōya Line
- Distance: 47.8 km (29.7 miles) from Shiomibashi
- Platforms: 2 side platforms
- Connections

Other information
- Status: Unstaffed
- Station code: NK78
- Website: Official website

History
- Opened: 15 March 1925
- Former names: Shimizu (until 1925)

Passengers
- FY2019: 251 daily

Services
Preceding station	Nankai Electric Railway	Following station
Hashimoto towards Namba	Kōya Line Local Express Rapid Express	Kamuro towards Gokurakubashi
Location
- Location within Wakayama Prefecture Location within Japan

Kii-Shimizu Station (紀伊清水駅, Kii-Shimizu-eki) is a passenger railway station in the city of Hashimoto, Wakayama Prefecture, Japan, operated by the private railway company Nankai Electric Railway.

== Lines ==
Kii-Shimizu Station is served by the Nankai Kōya Line, and is located 47.8 kilometers from the terminus of the line at Shiomibashi Station and 47.1 kilometers from Namba Station.

== Station layout ==
The station consists of two opposed side platforms connected to the station building by a level crossing. The station is unattended.

=== Platforms ===
1	■ Nankai Kōya Line	for Kōyasan
2	■ Nankai Kōya Line	for Nanba

== History ==
Kii-Shimizu Station opened on March 15, 1925. The Nankai Railway was merged into the Kintetsu group in 1944 by orders of the Japanese government, and reemerged as the Nankai Railway Company in 1947.

== Passenger statistics ==
In fiscal 2019, the station was used by an average of 251 passengers daily (boarding passengers only).

== Surrounding area ==
- Hashimoto City Shimizu Elementary School
- Jofukuji Temple

== See also ==
- List of railway stations in Japan
