= Shimo-Kosawa Station =

Railway station in Kudoyama, Wakayama Prefecture, Japan

Shimokosawa Station 下古沢駅
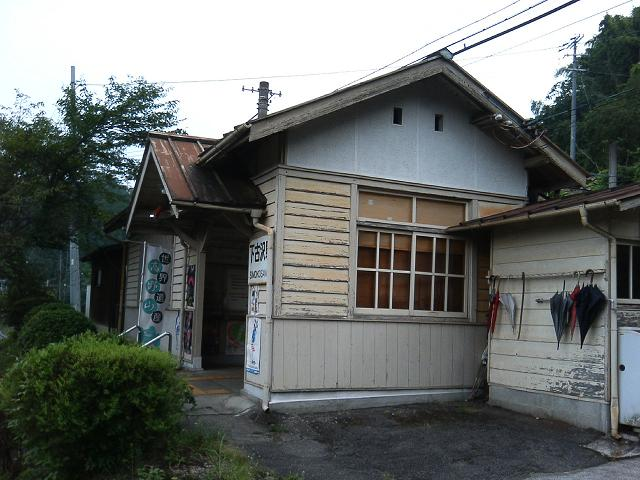
- Shimokosawa Station, November 2018

General information
- Location: Shimokosawa, Kudoyama-cho, Ito-gun, Wakayama-ken 648-0145; Japan
- Coordinates: 34°15′59.35″N 135°33′11.55″E
- Operator: Nankai Electric Railway
- Line: Koya Line
- Distance: 55.9 km (34.7 miles) from Shiomibashi
- Platforms: 2 side platforms

Other information
- Status: Staffed
- Station code: NK82
- Website: Official website

History
- Opened: 18 June 1928

Passengers
- FY2019: 25 daily

Services
Preceding station	Nankai Electric Railway	Following station
Kōyashita towards Namba	Kōya Line Local Express Rapid Express	Kami-Kosawa towards Gokurakubashi
Location
- Location within Wakayama Prefecture Location within Japan

Shimo-Kosawa Station (下古沢駅, Shimo-Kosawa-eki) is a passenger railway station in the town of Kudoyama, Ito District, Wakayama Prefecture, Japan, operated by the private railway company Nankai Electric Railway.

== Lines ==
Shimo-Kosawa Station is served by the Nankai Kōya Line, and is located 55.9 kilometers from the terminus of the line at Shiomibashi Station and 55.2 kilometers from Namba Station.

== Station layout ==
The station consists of two opposed side platforms connected to the station building by a level crossing. The station is staffed.

=== Platforms ===
1	■ Nankai Kōya Line	for Kōyasan
2	■ Nankai Kōya Line	for Nanba

== History ==
Shimo-Kosawa Station opened on June 18, 1928. The Nankai Railway was merged into the Kintetsu group in 1944 by orders of the Japanese government, and reemerged as the Nankai Railway Company in 1947.

== Passenger statistics ==
In fiscal 2019, the station was used by an average of 25 passengers daily (boarding passengers only).

== Surrounding area ==
- Japan National Route 370

== See also ==
- List of railway stations in Japan
