= Kudoyama Station =

Railway station in Kudoyama, Wakayama Prefecture, Japan

Kudoyama Station 九度山駅
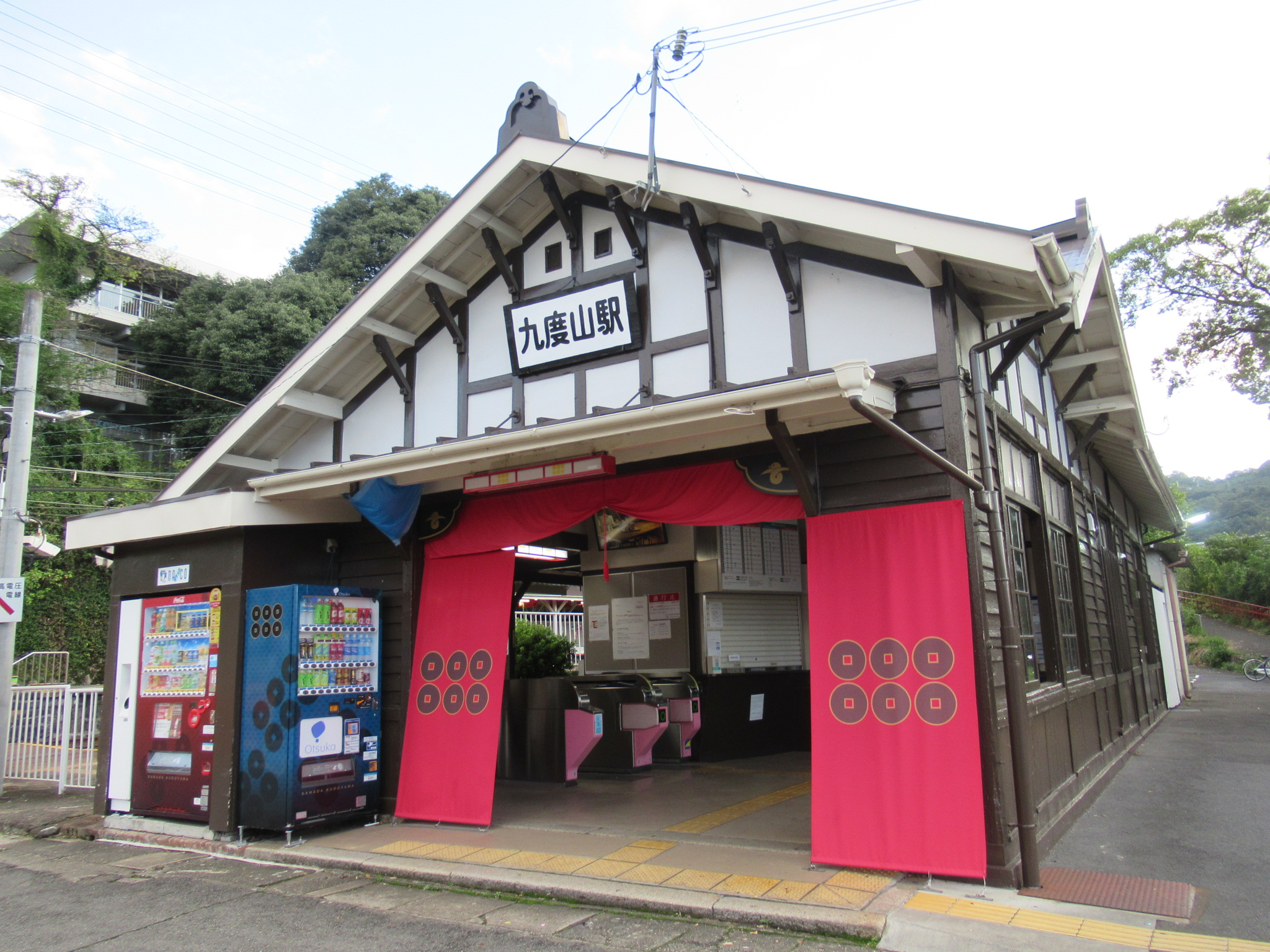
- Kudoyama Station in October 2018

General information
- Location: 123-2, Kudoyama, Kudoyama-cho, Ito-gun, Wakayama-ken 648-0101; Japan
- Coordinates: 34°17′17.31″N 135°33′52.25″E
- Operator: Nankai Electric Railway
- Line: Kōya Line
- Distance: 52.2 km (32.4 miles) from Shiomibashi
- Platforms: 2 side platforms
- Connections

Other information
- Status: Unstaffed
- Station code: NK80
- Website: Official website

History
- Opened: 25 December 1924

Passengers
- FY2019: 566 daily

Services
Preceding station	Nankai Electric Railway	Following station
Kamuro towards Namba	Kōya Line Local Express Rapid Express	Kōyashita towards Gokurakubashi
Kamuro towards Hashimoto	Tenkū	Gokurakubashi Terminus
Location
- Location within Wakayama Prefecture Location within Japan

Kudoyama Station (九度山駅, Kudoyama-eki) is a passenger railway station in the town of Kudoyama, Ito District, Wakayama Prefecture, Japan, operated by the private railway company Nankai Electric Railway.

== Lines ==
Kudoyama Station is served by the Nankai Kōya Line, and is located 52.2 kilometers from the terminus of the line at Shiomibashi Station and 51.5 kilometers from Namba Station.

== Station layout ==
The station consists of two opposed side platforms connected to the station building by a level crossing. The station is unattended.

=== Platforms ===
1	■ Nankai Kōya Line	for Kōyasan
2	■ Nankai Kōya Line	for Hashimoto and Namba

== History ==
Kudoyama Station opened on December 25, 1924.

== Passenger statistics ==
In fiscal 2019, the station was used by an average of 566 passengers daily (boarding passengers only).

== Surrounding area ==
- Kudoyama Municipal Kudoyama Junior High School
- Kudoyama Municipal Kudoyama Elementary School
- Sanada-an
- Jison-in

== See also ==
- List of railway stations in Japan
