= Kōyashita Station =

Railway station in Kudoyama, Wakayama Prefecture, Japan

Kōyashita Station 高野下駅
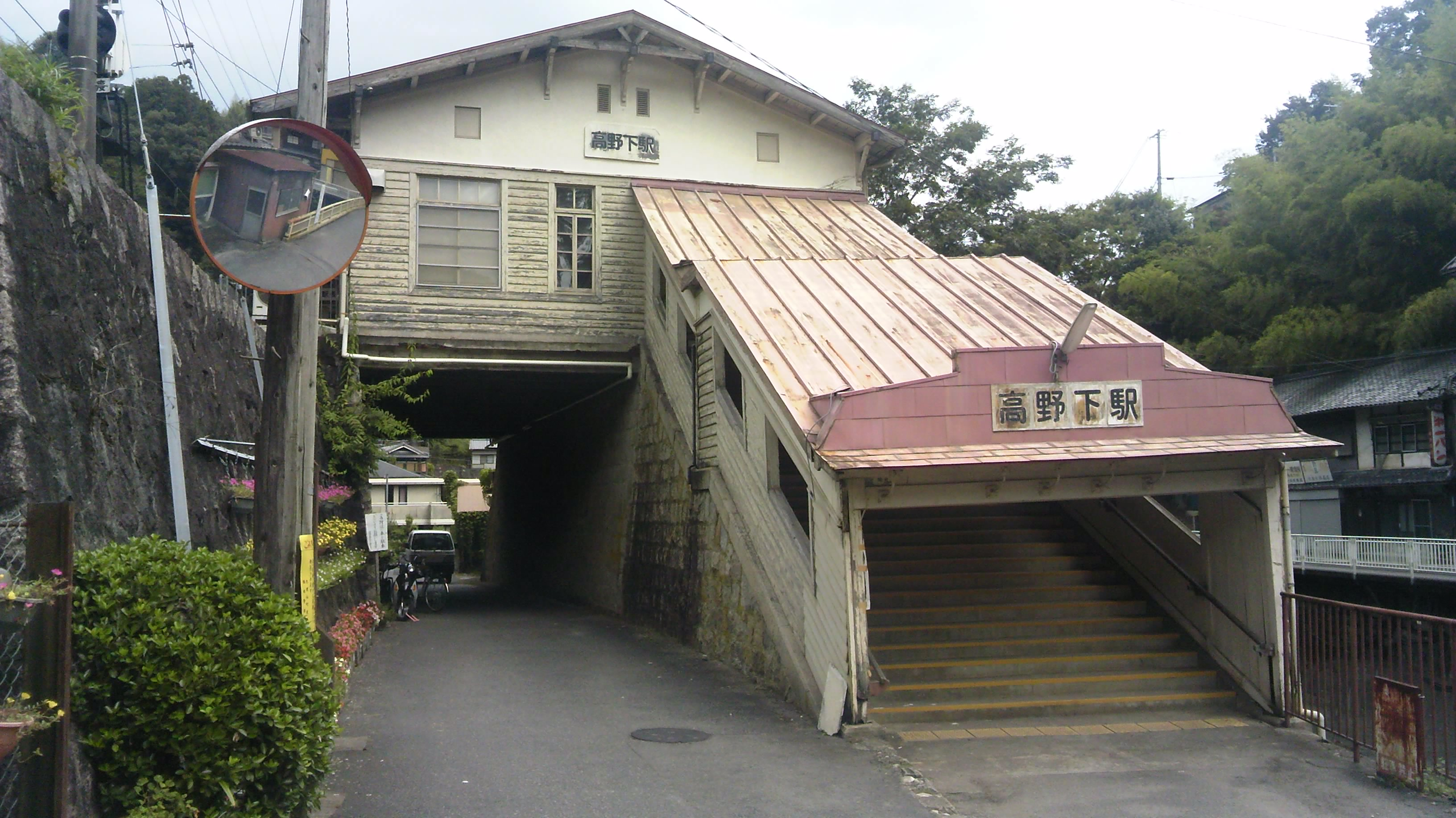
- Kōyashita Station, September 2011

General information
- Location: 8-1, Shiide, Kudoyama-cho, Ito-gun, Wakayama-ken 648-0141; Japan
- Coordinates: 34°16′18.7″N 135°33′58.85″E
- Operator: Nankai Electric Railway
- Line: Koya Line
- Distance: 54.2 km (33.7 miles) from Shiomibashi
- Platforms: 2 side platforms
- Connections

Other information
- Status: Unstaffed
- Station code: NK81
- Website: Official website

History
- Opened: 30 July 1925

Passengers
- FY2019: 86 daily
Location
- Location within Wakayama Prefecture Location within Japan

Kōyashita Station (高野下駅, Kōyashita-eki) is a passenger railway station in the town of Kudoyama, Ito District, Wakayama Prefecture, Japan, operated by the private railway company Nankai Electric Railway.

== Lines ==
Kōyashita Station is served by the Nankai Kōya Line, and is located 54.2 kilometers from the terminus of the line at Shiomibashi Station and 53.5 kilometers from Namba Station.

== Station layout ==
The station consists of two opposed side platforms connected to the station building by a level crossing. third side platform, formerly used for freight operations, remains in situ but is no longer in use. The station is unattended.

=== Platforms ===
1	■ Nankai Kōya Line	for Kōyasan
2	■ Nankai Kōya Line	for Hashimoto and Nanba

== Adjacent stations ==
«	Service	»
Nankai Electric Railway Koya Line
Limited Express "Koya": Does not stop at this station
Sightseeing train "Tenkū": Does not stop at this station
Kudoyama	Rapid Express	Shimo-Kosawa
Kudoyama	Express	Shimo-Kosawa
Kudoyama	Local	Shimo-Kosawa

== History ==
Kōyashita Station opened on July 30, 1925 as Kōyasan Station (高野山駅). It was renamed to its present name on September 11 of the same year. The Nankai Railway was merged into the Kintetsu group in 1944 by orders of the Japanese government, and reemerged as the Nankai Railway Company in 1947.

== Passenger statistics ==
In fiscal 2019, the station was used by an average of 86 passengers daily (boarding passengers only).

== Surrounding area ==
- Japan National Route 370
- Shiidegenshima Shrine

== See also ==
- List of railway stations in Japan
