= Kamuro Station =

Railway station in Hashimoto, Wakayama Prefecture, Japan

Kamuro Station 学文路駅
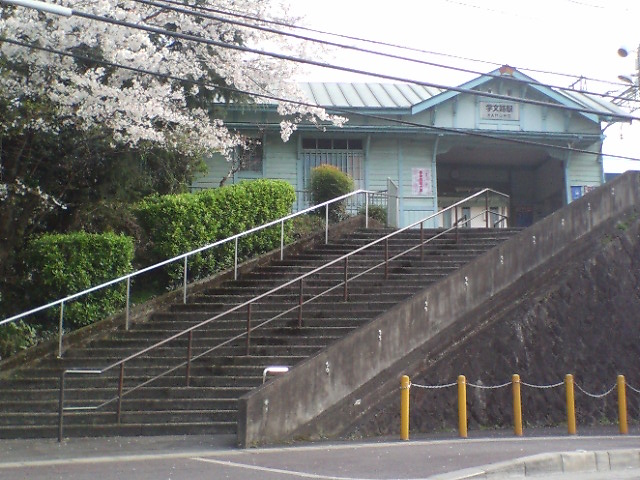
- Kamuro Station building in April 2007

General information
- Location: 361-1, Kamuro, Hashimoto-shi, Wakayama-ken 648-0043; Japan
- Coordinates: 34°17′47.9″N 135°34′49.3″E
- Operator: Nankai Electric Railway
- Line: Kōya Line
- Distance: 50.4 km (31.3 miles) from Shiomibashi
- Platforms: 2 side platforms

Other information
- Status: Unstaffed
- Station code: NK79
- Website: Official website

History
- Opened: 1 November 1924

Passengers
- FY2019: 436 daily

Services
Preceding station	Nankai Electric Railway	Following station
Kii-Shimizu towards Namba	Kōya Line Local Express Rapid Express	Kudoyama towards Gokurakubashi
Hashimoto Terminus	Tenkū	Kudoyama towards Gokurakubashi
Location
- Location within Wakayama Prefecture Location within Japan

Kamuro Station (学文路駅, Kamuro-eki) is a passenger railway station in the city of Hashimoto, Wakayama Prefecture, Japan, operated by the private railway company Nankai Electric Railway.

== Lines ==
Kamuro Station is served by the Nankai Kōya Line, and is located 50.4 kilometers from the terminus of the line at Shiomibashi Station and 49.7 kilometers from Namba Station.

== Station layout ==
The station consists of two opposed side platforms connected to the station building by a level crossing. The station is unattended.

=== Platforms ===
1	■ Nankai Kōya Line	for Kōyasan
2	■ Nankai Kōya Line	for Namba

== History ==
Kamuro Station opened on November 1, 1924. The Nankai Railway was merged into the Kintetsu group in 1944 by orders of the Japanese government, and reemerged as the Nankai Railway Company in 1947.

== Passenger statistics ==
In fiscal 2019, the station was used by an average of 436 passengers daily (boarding passengers only).

== Surrounding area ==
- Kamuro Tenmangu
- Kamuro Daishi
- Hashimoto City Kamuro Elementary School

== See also ==
- List of railway stations in Japan
