= 30000 series =

30000 series may refer to:

== Japanese train types ==
- Kintetsu 30000 series EMU
- Nankai 30000 series EMU
- Odakyu 30000 series EXE EMU
- Osaka Municipal Subway 30000 series EMU
- Seibu 30000 series EMU
- Tobu 30000 series EMU
