= Kōyaguchi, Wakayama =

Dissolved municipality in Wakayama prefecture, Japan

Kōyaguchi (高野口町, Kōyaguchi-chō) was a town located in Ito District, Wakayama Prefecture, Japan.

As of 2003, the town had an estimated population of 14,889 and a density of 742.22 persons per km^{2}. The total area was 20.06 km^{2}.

On March 1, 2006, Kōyaguchi was merged into the expanded city of Hashimoto.
