= Hashimoto, Wakayama =

Hashimoto 橋本市
- City
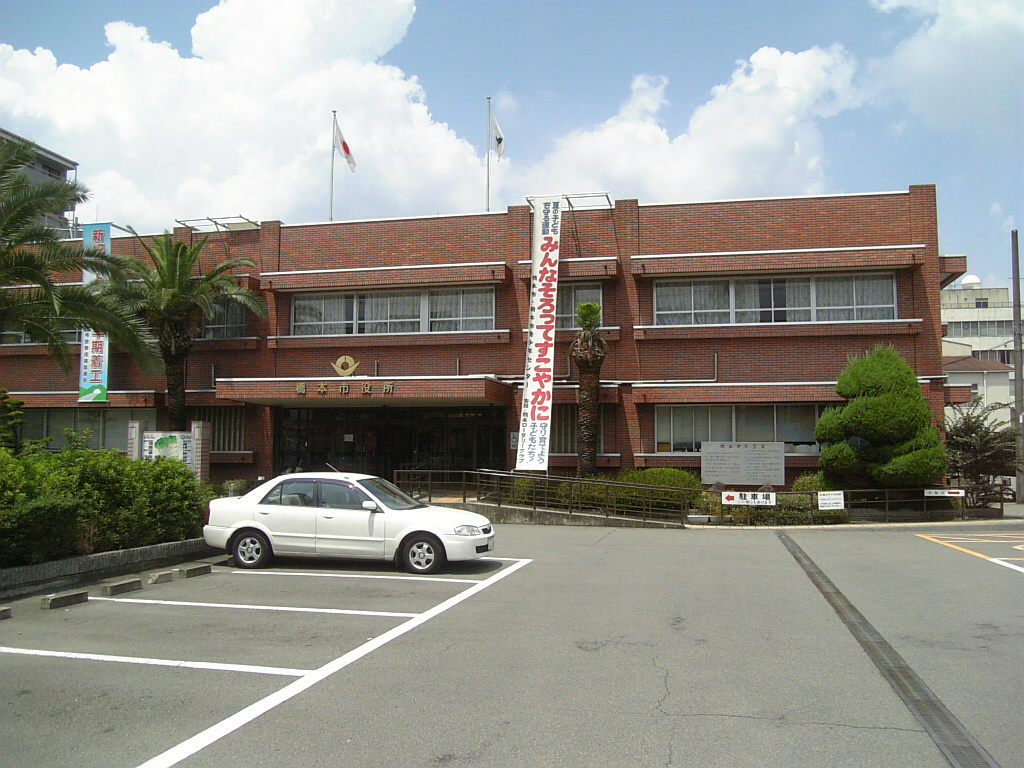
- Hashimoto City Hall

- Flag Emblem

- Location of Hashimoto in Wakayama Prefecture

- Location in Japan
- Coordinates: 34°19′N 135°36′E
- Country: Japan
- Region: Kansai
- Prefecture: Wakayama
- Town settled: May 10, 1894
- City settled: January 1, 1955

Government
  - Mayor: Tetsurõ Hiraki (ja:平木哲朗) - from April 2014

Area
  - Total: 130.55 km^{2} (50.41 sq mi)

Population (November 30, 2021)
  - Total: 61,063
  - Density: 467.74/km^{2} (1,211.4/sq mi)
- Time zone: UTC+09:00 (JST)
- City hall address: 1-1-1, Tōge, Hashimoto-shi, Wakayama-ken 648-8585
- Website: www.city.hashimoto.lg.jp
- Symbols
- Flower: Satsuki azalea
- Tree: Osmanthus and sakura

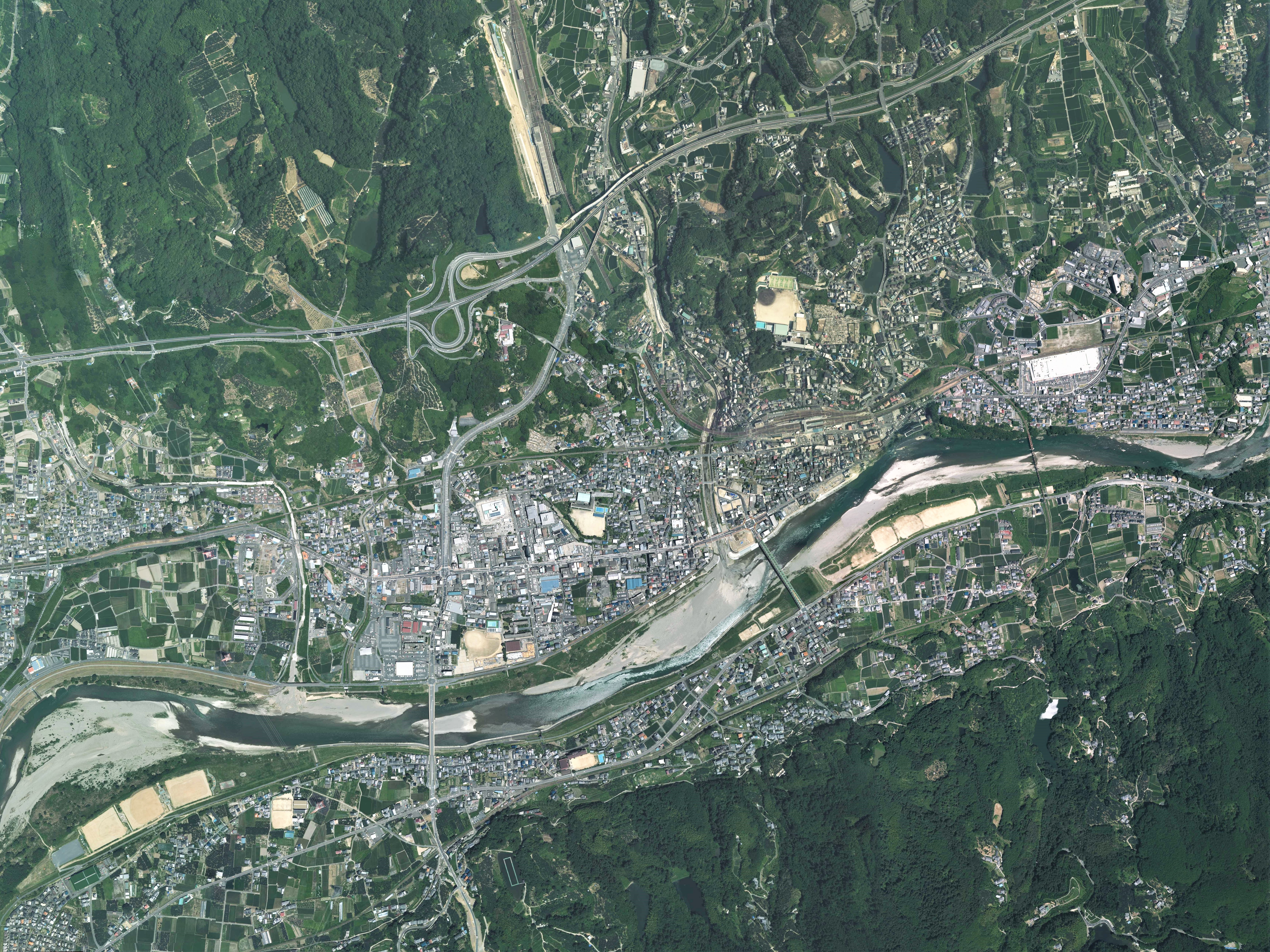
Hashimoto city center in 2012 aerial photograph

Hashimoto (橋本市, Hashimoto-shi) is a city located in Wakayama Prefecture, Japan. As of 30 November 2021, the city had an estimated population of 61,063 in 27,392 households and a population density of 470 persons per km^{2}. The total area of the city is 130.55 square kilometres (50.41 sq mi).

== Geography ==
Hashimoto is located near the prefectural border at the northeastern end of Wakayama Prefecture, bordering Kawachinagano in Osaka Prefecture to the north and Gojō in Nara Prefecture to the east. There are also a couple of small exclaves in the neighboring towns of Katsuragi, Wakayama, and Kudoyama. Because it is close to the plate boundary on the south coast of Honshu, the mountains near Hashimoto are steep; the city is located between the Kongō Mountains and Kisen Mountains in the north and the Kii Mountains in the south. Hashimoto is on the middle of the Kinokawa River. In addition, Hashimoto City is located directly above the Japan Median Tectonic Line, which is a large fault that runs east to west in western Japan.

=== Neighboring municipalities ===
Nara Prefecture

- Gojō

Osaka Prefecture

- Kawachinagano

Wakayama Prefecture

- Katsuragi
- Kōya
- Kudōyama

== Climate ==
Hashimoto has a humid subtropical climate (Köppen Cfa) characterized by warm summers and cool winters with light to no snowfall. The average annual temperature in Hashimoto is 13.3 °C. The average annual rainfall is 1781 mm with September as the wettest month.

== Demographics ==
Per Japanese census data, the population of Hashimoto peaked at around the year 2000 and has declined slightly since.

Historical population
Year	Pop.	±%
1920	32,483	—
1930	35,880	+10.5%
1940	37,178	+3.6%
1950	46,516	+25.1%
1960	47,309	+1.7%
1970	49,747	+5.2%
1980	52,616	+5.8%
1990	62,156	+18.1%
2000	70,469	+13.4%
2010	66,362	−5.8%

== History ==
The area of the modern city of Hashimoto was within ancient Kii Province, and artifacts from the Jōmon period indicate a long period of human occupancy. Located in the middle reaches of the Kinokawa River, it once prospered as a post town for timber transportation and for pilgrims heading to Mount Kōya. During the late Edo period and Meiji period, sericulture and silk textiles became an important part of the local economy, but they have now disappeared. The village of Hashimoto was established with the creation of the modern municipalities system on April 1, 1889, and was raised to town status on May 10, 1894. On January 1, 1955, Hashimoto merged with the neighboring villages of Kishikami, Yamada, Kimi, Suda, and Kamuro to form the city of Hashimoto. On March 1, 2006, the town of Kōyaguchi (from Ito District) was merged into Hashimoto.

== Government ==
Hashimoto has a mayor-council form of government with a directly elected mayor and a unicameral city council of eighteen members. Hashimoto contributes three members to the Wakayama Prefectural Assembly. In terms of national politics, the city is part of Wakayama 2nd district of the lower house of the Diet of Japan.

== Economy ==
The mainstay of the local economy is horticulture, especially that of Japanese persimmons and Japanese pears, as well as the poultry industry. The area has traditionally been known for its Japanese white crucian carp fish farms and its textiles. As the only city in Wakayama prefecture that is included in the Osaka metropolitan area (in terms of urban employment), there are an increasing number of commuters, gradually transforming the area into a bedroom community.

== Education ==
Hashimoto has fifteen public elementary schools and five public middle schools operated by the city government, in addition to two public high schools and two combined public middle/high schools operated by the Wakayama Prefectural Department of Education. The city also has one private middle school and one private high school. The city also has one private combined elementary/middle school and one private combined middle/high school.

== Transportation ==
=== Railway ===
JR West – Wakayama Line

- Suda - Shimohyōgo - Hashimoto - Kii-Yamada - Kōyaguchi

Nankai Electric Railway – Nankai Kōya Line

- Kimitōge - Rinkanden-entoshi - Miyukitsuji - Hashimoto - Kii-Shimizu - Kamuro

=== Highway ===
- Keinawa Expressway
- National Route 24
- National Route 370
- National Route 371

== Notable people from Hashimoto ==
- Masaru Furukawa, swimmer
- Hideko Maehata, breaststroke swimmer
- Junpei Mizobata, actor
- Yoshitomo Tsutsugo, baseball player
