= Kudoyama =

Kudoyama 九度山町
- Town
- Kudoyama town office

- Flag Emblem

- Location of Kudoyama in Wakayama Prefecture

- Location in Japan
- Coordinates: 34°17′N 135°34′E
- Country: Japan
- Region: Kansai
- Prefecture: Wakayama
- District: Ito

Government
  - Mayor: Akira Okamoto

Area
  - Total: 44.15 km^{2} (17.05 sq mi)

Population (November 30, 2021)
  - Total: 3,996
  - Density: 90.51/km^{2} (234.4/sq mi)
- Time zone: UTC+09:00 (JST)
- City hall address: 1190 Kudoyama, Kudoyama-cho, Ito-gun, Wakayama-ken 648-0198
- Website: Official website
- Symbols
- Flower: Tree Peony
- Tree: Japanese persimmon

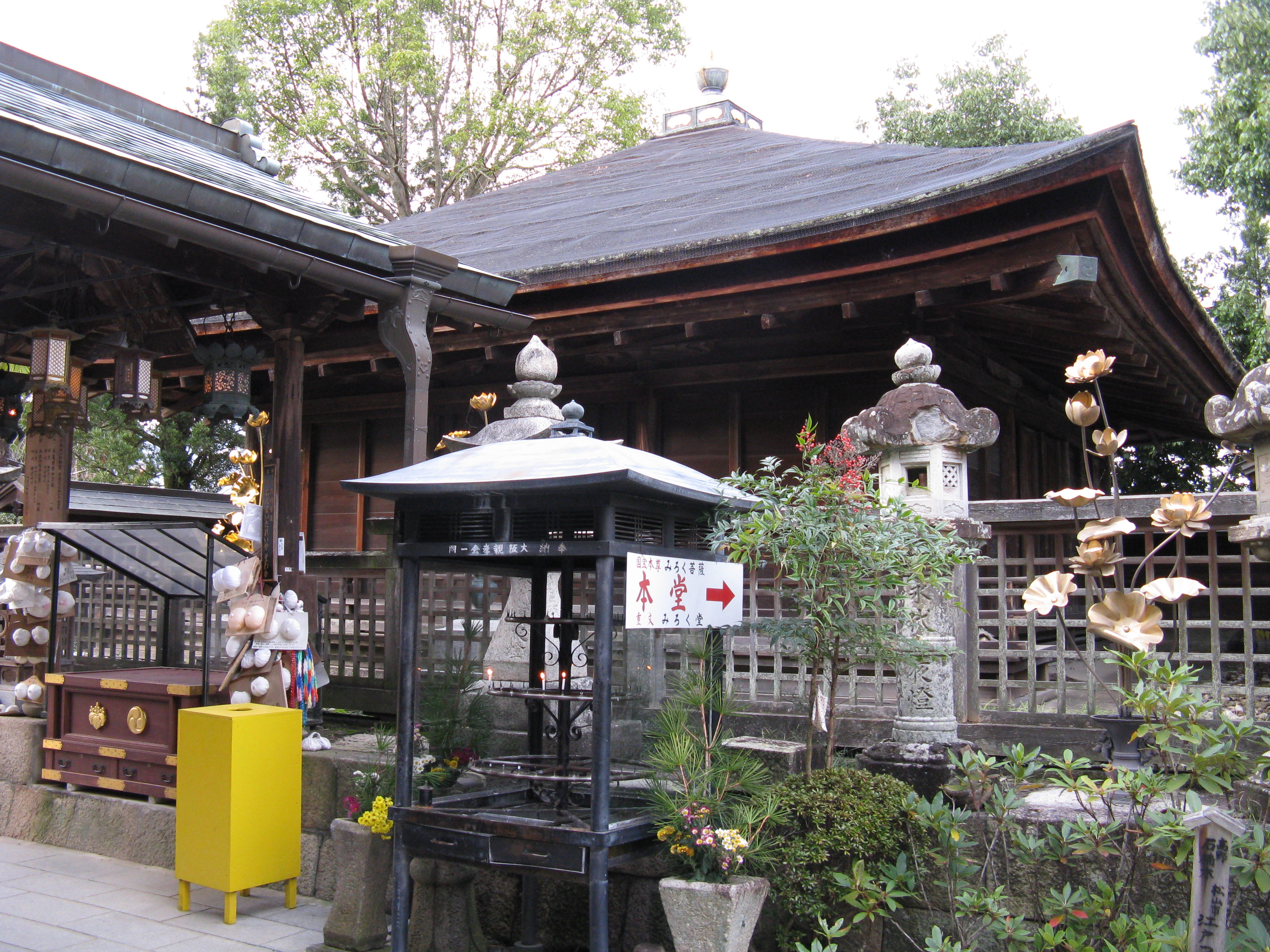
Jison-in temple

Kudoyama (九度山町, Kudoyama-chō) is a town located in Ito District, Wakayama Prefecture, Japan. As of 30 November 2021, the town had an estimated population of 3,996 in 1770 households and a population density of 91 persons per km^{2}. The total area of the town is 44.15 square kilometres (17.05 sq mi).

== Geography ==
Kudoyama is located near the prefectural border at the northeastern end of Wakayama Prefecture, on the south bank of the Kinokawa River, and consists of a valley formed along the Fudodani River that flows into it, and a valley formed by the Nyu River that flows into it from the east.

=== Neighbouring municipalities ===
Wakayama Prefecture

- Hashimoto
- Katsuragi
- Kōya

== Climate ==
Kudoyama has a humid subtropical climate (Köppen Cfa) characterized by warm summers and cool winters with light to no snowfall. The average annual temperature in Kudoyama is 13.3 °C. The average annual rainfall is 1781 mm with September as the wettest month. The temperatures are highest on average in August, at around 25.1 °C, and lowest in January, at around 1.8 °C.

== Demographics ==
Per Japanese census data, the population of Kudoyama has declined steadily over the last 70 years.

Historical population
Year	Pop.	±%
1920	7,567	—
1930	7,700	+1.8%
1940	7,446	−3.3%
1950	9,299	+24.9%
1960	8,544	−8.1%
1970	8,091	−5.3%
1980	7,693	−4.9%
1990	7,076	−8.0%
2000	6,073	−14.2%
2010	4,963	−18.3%

== History ==
The area of the modern town of Kudoyama was within ancient Kii Province and was long associated with Mount Koya. In the Heian period, the temple of Jison-in, which had the grave of the mother of Kūkai. During the Sengoku period, it was the location of exile for Sanada Masayuki and Sanada Yukimura. The village of Kudyama was established with the creation of the modern municipalities system on April 1, 1889, and was raised to town status on September 1, 1910. The village of Kane was annexed by Kudoyama on March 31, 1955.

== Government ==
Kudoyama has a mayor-council form of government with a directly elected mayor and a unicameral town council of 10 members. Kudoyama collectively with the town of Kōya, contributes one member to the Wakayama Prefectural Assembly. In terms of national politics, the town is part of Wakayama 2nd district of the lower house of the Diet of Japan.

== Economy ==
The economy of Kudoyama is centered on horticulture and seasonal tourism. The town has long been regarded as the gateway to the temples of Mount Koya. The production of washi paper is a local handicraft.

== Education ==
Kudoyama has three public elementary schools and two public middle schools operated by the town government. The town does not have a high school.

== Transportation ==
=== Railway ===
Nankai Electric Railway – Nankai Kōya Line

- Kudoyama - Kōyashita - Shimo-Kosawa - Kami-Kosawa

=== Highway ===
- National Route 370

== Local attractions ==
- Jison-in temple
- Kōyasan chōishi-michi
- Niukanshōfu Shrine
- Sacred Sites and Pilgrimage Routes in the Kii Mountain Range

== Notable people from Kudoyama ==
- Takao Obana, manager of the Yokohama BayStars
- Masanori Sugiura, Olympic baseball player
