= Kōya =

Kōya 高野町
- Town
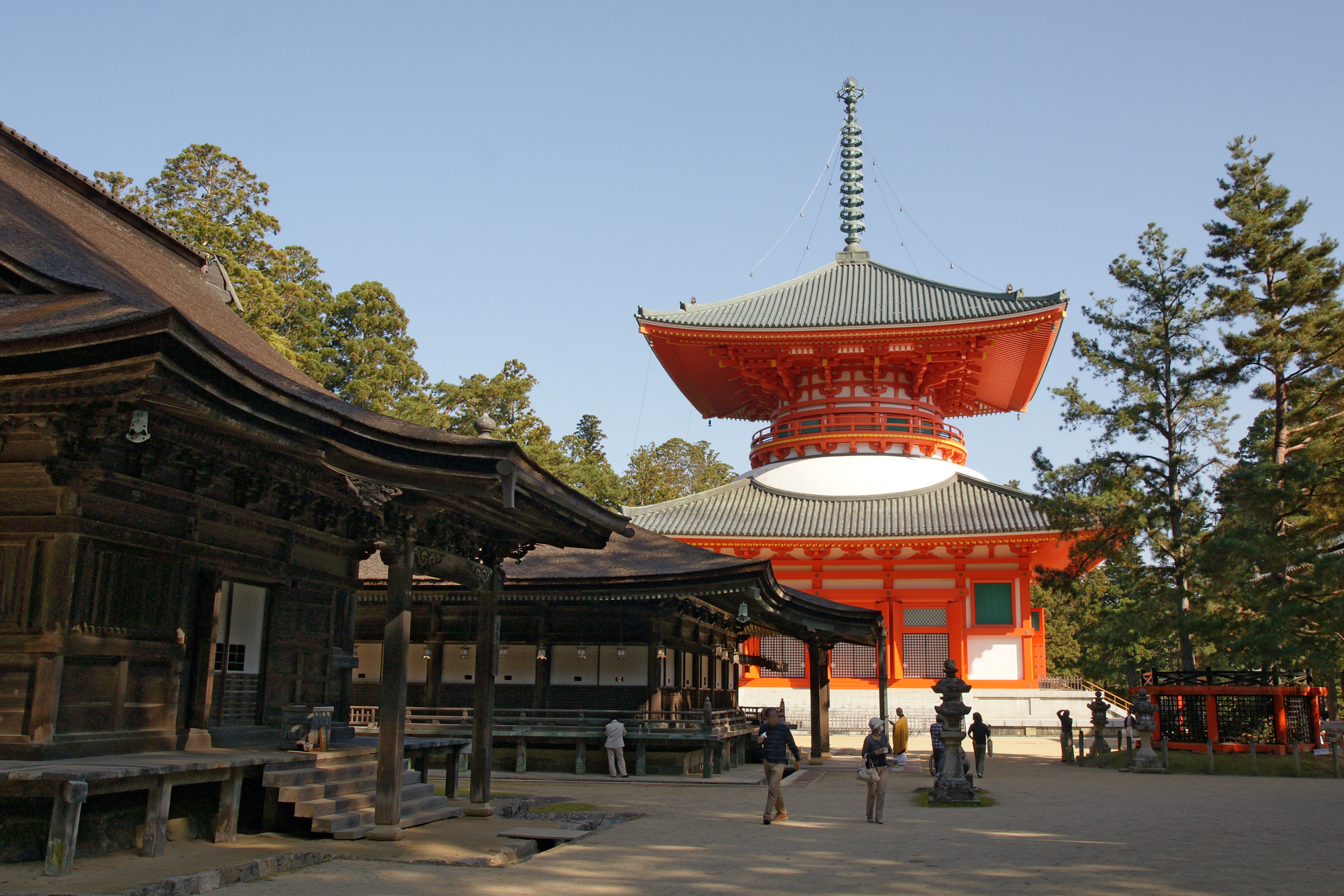
- The Danjōgaran complex at Mount Kōya

- Flag Emblem

- Location of Kōya in Wakayama Prefecture

- Location in Japan
- Coordinates: 34°13′N 135°35′E
- Country: Japan
- Region: Kansai
- Prefecture: Wakayama
- District: Ito

Government
  - Mayor: Takeji Kise (since May 2010)

Area
  - Total: 137.03 km^{2} (52.91 sq mi)

Population (November 30, 2021)
  - Total: 2,812
  - Density: 20.52/km^{2} (53.15/sq mi)
- Time zone: UTC+09:00 (JST)
- City hall address: Oji Koyasan 636, Koya-cho, Ito-gun, Wakayama-ken 648-0281
- Climate: Cfa/Dfa
- Website: Official website
- Symbols
- Flower: Rhododendron
- Tree: Sciadopitys verticillata

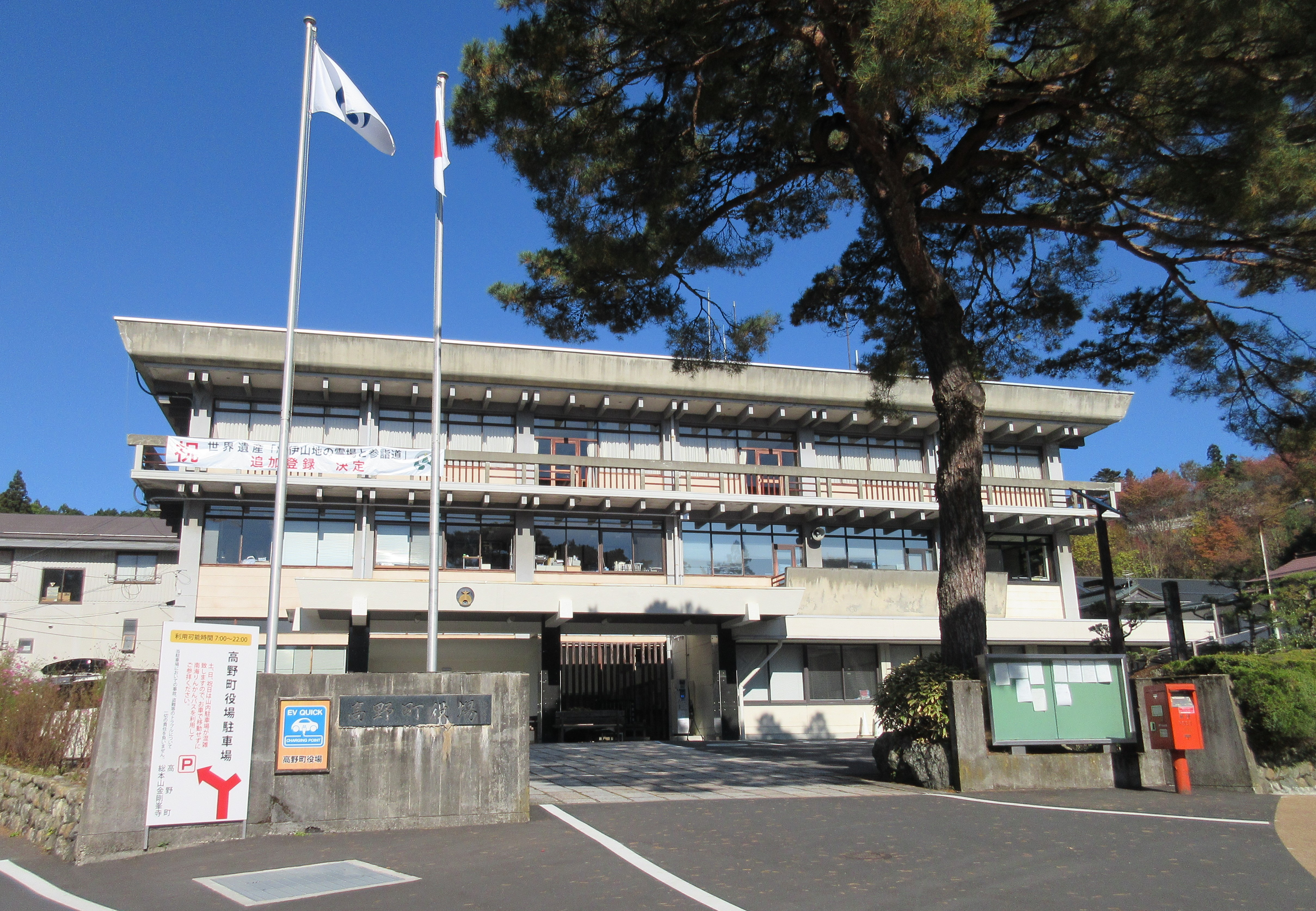
Kōya town hall

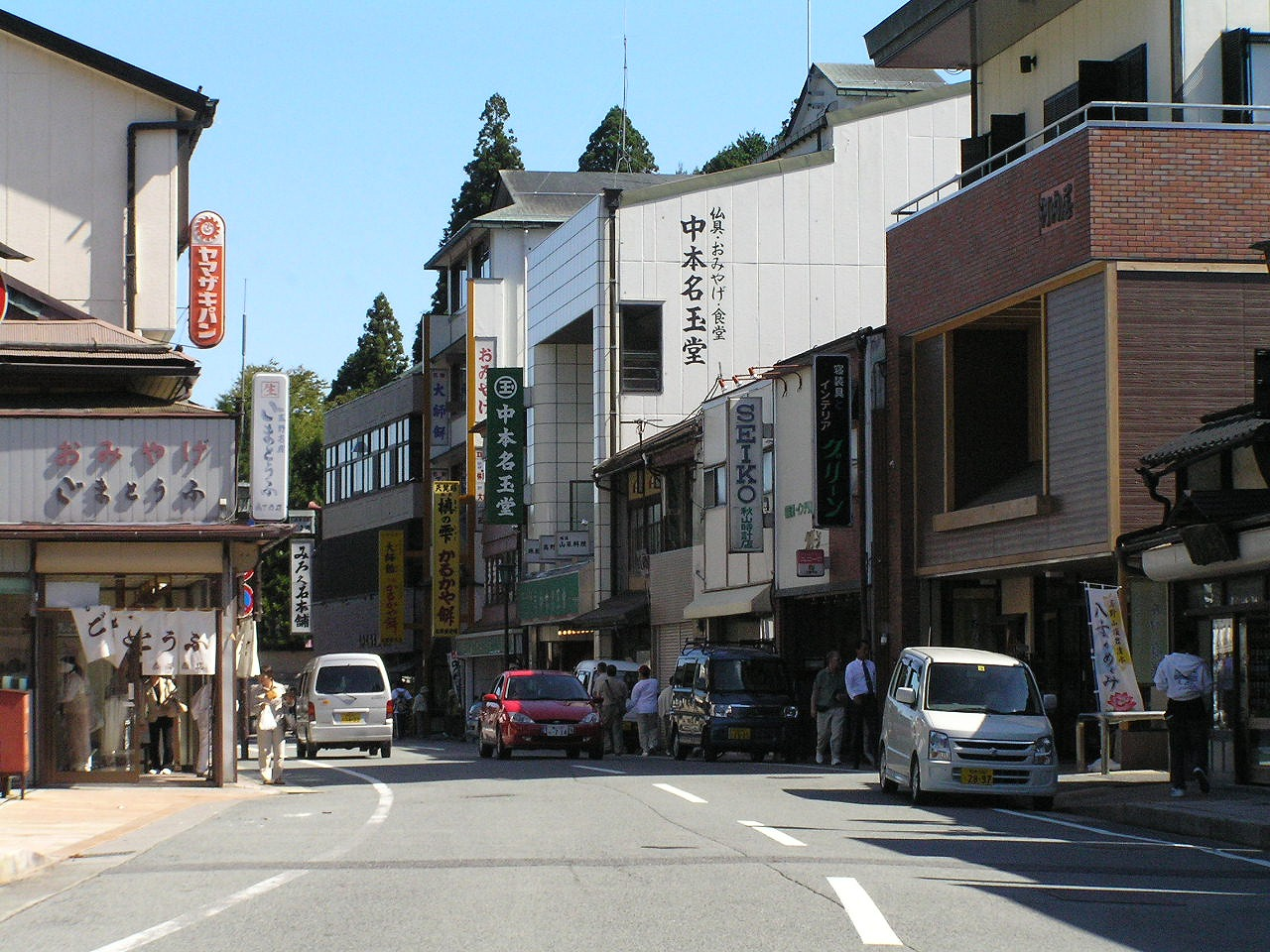
Central Kōya

Kōya (高野町, Kōya-chō) is a town located in Ito District, Wakayama Prefecture, Japan. As of 30 November 2021, the town had an estimated population of 2,812, in 1,575 households. It had a population density of 21 persons per km^{2}. The total area of the town is 137.03 square kilometres (52.91 sq mi). The town is known as the headquarters of the Shingon sect of Japanese Buddhism.

== Geography ==
Kōya is located near the prefectural border at the northeastern end of Wakayama Prefecture, on the heavily-forest plateau of Mount Koya.

=== Neighbouring municipalities ===
Wakayama Prefecture

- Hashimoto
- Katsuragi
- Kudoyama

Nara Prefecture

- Nosegawa

== Climate ==
Kōya has a humid continental climate (Köppen Dfa/Cfa). It has warm summers, and cool winters with light to no snowfall. The average annual temperature in Kōya is 11.1 °C (52.0 °F). The average annual rainfall is 2,003.1 mm (78.86 in). June is the wettest month. The temperatures are highest on average in August, at around 22.8 °C (73.0 °F), and lowest in January, at around −0.3 °C (31.5 °F).

Climate data for Mount Kōya, Kōya (1991−2020 normals, extremes 1979−present)
Month	Jan	Feb	Mar	Apr	May	Jun	Jul	Aug	Sep	Oct	Nov	Dec	Year
Record high °C (°F)	15.1 (59.2)	17.9 (64.2)	20.3 (68.5)	26.5 (79.7)	29.6 (85.3)	31.2 (88.2)	34.6 (94.3)	33.2 (91.8)	32.2 (90.0)	27.2 (81.0)	22.3 (72.1)	19.7 (67.5)	34.6 (94.3)
Mean daily maximum °C (°F)	3.4 (38.1)	4.8 (40.6)	9.2 (48.6)	15.1 (59.2)	20.1 (68.2)	22.8 (73.0)	26.6 (79.9)	27.8 (82.0)	23.7 (74.7)	17.8 (64.0)	12.2 (54.0)	6.3 (43.3)	15.8 (60.4)
Daily mean °C (°F)	−0.3 (31.5)	0.4 (32.7)	4.0 (39.2)	9.4 (48.9)	14.4 (57.9)	18.1 (64.6)	22.1 (71.8)	22.8 (73.0)	19.1 (66.4)	13.2 (55.8)	7.5 (45.5)	2.2 (36.0)	11.1 (52.0)
Mean daily minimum °C (°F)	−4.0 (24.8)	−3.8 (25.2)	−1.0 (30.2)	3.7 (38.7)	8.9 (48.0)	14.0 (57.2)	18.4 (65.1)	18.8 (65.8)	15.3 (59.5)	9.1 (48.4)	3.0 (37.4)	−1.6 (29.1)	6.8 (44.2)
Record low °C (°F)	−12.8 (9.0)	−13.4 (7.9)	−9.4 (15.1)	−5.1 (22.8)	−1.4 (29.5)	3.4 (38.1)	9.9 (49.8)	11.8 (53.2)	5.0 (41.0)	−1.5 (29.3)	−5.0 (23.0)	−10.0 (14.0)	−13.4 (7.9)
Average precipitation mm (inches)	87.6 (3.45)	97.4 (3.83)	141.7 (5.58)	141.5 (5.57)	166.6 (6.56)	260.3 (10.25)	256.4 (10.09)	192.5 (7.58)	247.5 (9.74)	203.3 (8.00)	108.4 (4.27)	89.3 (3.52)	2,003.1 (78.86)
Average precipitation days (≥ 1.0 mm)	11.7	11.1	12.6	11.2	10.7	13.7	12.7	10.9	11.7	11.2	8.7	11.4	137.6
Mean monthly sunshine hours	82.9	96.7	138.5	176.5	185.5	124.9	146.1	166.8	124.7	130.6	115.6	93.0	1,582.3
Source: Japan Meteorological Agency (1991–2020 averages; extremes from 1979 to present)

== Demographics ==
Per Japanese census data, the population of Kōya has declined steadily over the last 70 years.

Historical population
Year	Pop.	±%
1920	9,339	—
1930	10,821	+15.9%
1940	9,973	−7.8%
1950	9,786	−1.9%
1960	9,324	−4.7%
1970	7,604	−18.4%
1980	7,326	−3.7%
1990	6,611	−9.8%
2000	5,355	−19.0%
2010	3,979	−25.7%

== History ==
The area of the modern town of Kōya was within ancient Kii Province. It has long been associated with the Shingon Buddhist temple complex on Mount Kōya, which was founded in 816AD. The village of Kōya was established with the creation of the modern municipalities system in April 1889. It was given town status in November 1918. The village of Fuki was annexed by Kōya in June 1958.

== Government ==
Kōya has a mayor-council form of government with a directly elected mayor and a unicameral town council of 10 members. Kōya collectively with the town of Kudyama, contributes one member to the Wakayama Prefectural Assembly. In terms of national politics, the town is part of Wakayama 2nd district of the lower house of the Diet of Japan.

== Economy ==
The economy of Kōya is centered on tourism. Since there are many temples, there are many people involved in Buddhist professions such as monks. There are many tourism related industry workers such as innkeepers, souvenir shops, and Buddhist equipment stores.

== Education ==
Kōya has three public elementary schools and one public middle school operated by the town government. One public high school is operated by the Wakayama Prefectural Board of Education throughout the year. Koyasan University (established in 1926), is a fully private university affiliated with Shingon Buddhism is located in the outskirts of the town.

== Transportation ==
=== Railway ===
Nankai Electric Railway – Nankai Kōya Line

- Kii-Hosokawa - Kii-Kamiya - Gokurakubashi

Nankai Electric Railway – Nankai Cable Line

- Gokurakubashi - Kōyasan

=== Highways ===
- National Route 370
- National Route 371
- National Route 480

== Local attractions ==
- Sacred Sites and Pilgrimage Routes in the Kii Mountain Range
- Mount Kōya
  - Kongōbu-ji
  - Kongō Sanmai-in
- Koyasan Reihōkan
