= Nankai 30000 series =

Japanese electric multiple unit train type

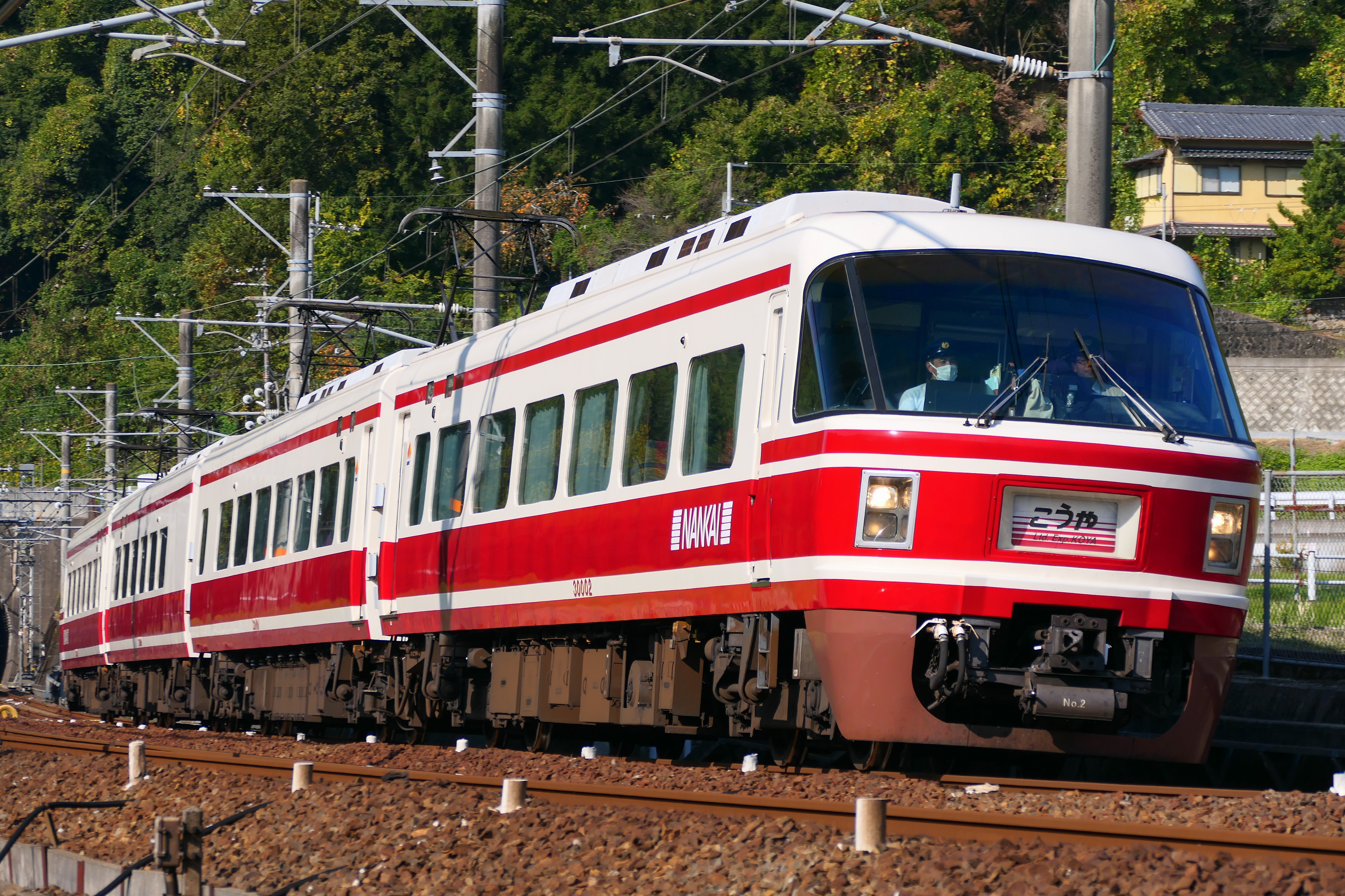
- A 30000 series set on a Koya service in November 2023
- In service: 1983–present
- Family name: Zoom Car
- Replaced: 20000 series
- Constructed: 1983
- Entered service: 26 June 1983
- Refurbished: 1999
- Number built: 8 vehicles (2 sets)
- Formation: 4 cars per trainset
- Fleet numbers: 30001, 30003
- Operator: Nankai Electric Railway
- Line served: Kōya Line

Specifications
- Doors: 1 per side
- Maximum speed: 100 km/h (62 mph)
- Electric systems: 1,500 V DC (overhead wire)
- Current collection: Pantograph
- Multiple working: 11000 series; 31000 series
- Track gauge: 1,067 mm (3 ft 6 in)

The Nankai 30000 series (南海30000系, Nankai 30000-kei) is an electric multiple unit (EMU) train type operated by the private railway operator Nankai Electric Railway in Japan since 1983. Two four-car sets were built to replace the sole 20000 series set.

== Operations ==
The 30000 series sets are used for Koya and Rinkan limited express services on the Koya Line. Since 1999, they are able to operate in multiple with the 11000 series and 31000 series trains.

== Interior ==
Passenger accommodation consists of transverse seating arranged in 2+2 abreast configuration. Car 2 has a vending machine while car 3 has toilets.

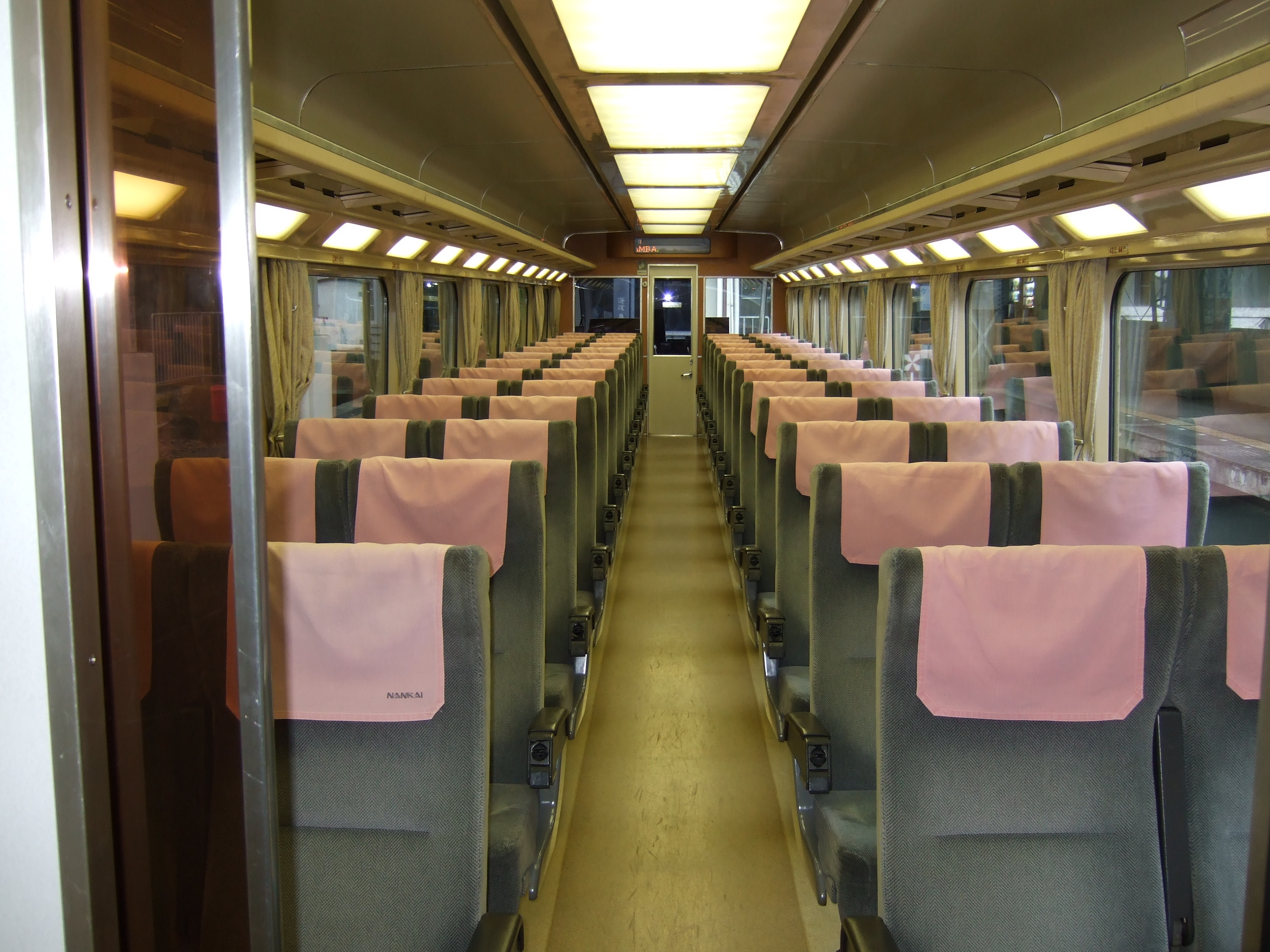
Interior view of a 30000 series car in May 2008

== History ==
The 30000 series fleet entered revenue service from the start of the revised timetable on 26 June 1983.

In 1999, the fleet underwent a programme of refurbishment. This included the addition of type and destination displays next to the doors and internal passenger information displays, and also the replacement of Japanese-style toilets with Western-style ones.

=== Incident ===
Cars 30101 and 30002 of set 30001 derailed at Oharata Inspection Depot on 27 May 2022. This set subsequently re-entered service on 29 April 2023.

== Livery variations ==
To commemorate the 1,200th anniversary of Mount Kōya, set 30001 was operated in a special "Red Koya" livery from 1 March 2015 and set 30003 returned to service in the "Purple Koya" livery on 23 March of that year. They were scheduled to operate in these liveries until February 2016.

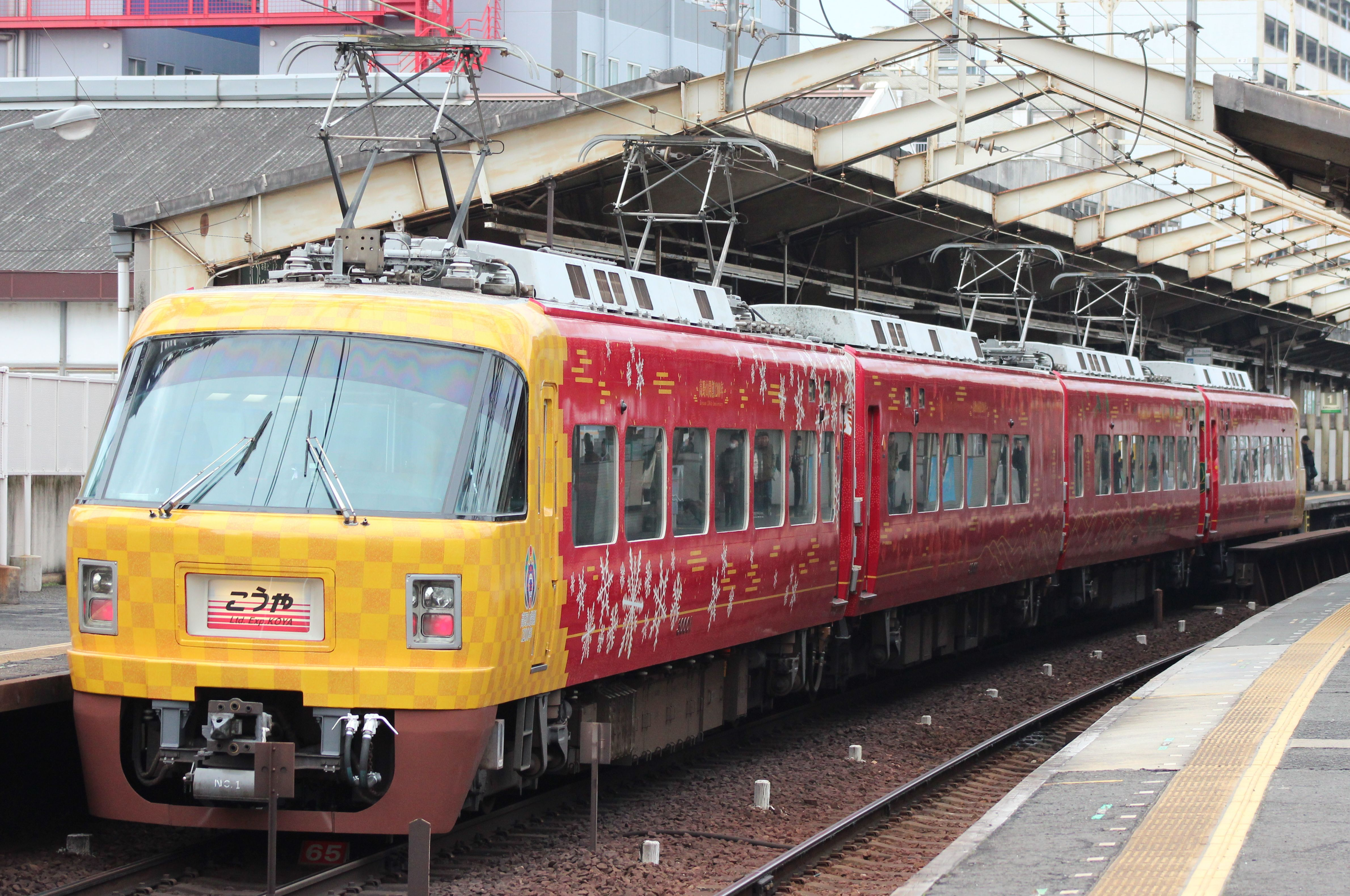
Set 30001 in "Red Koya" livery in March 2015

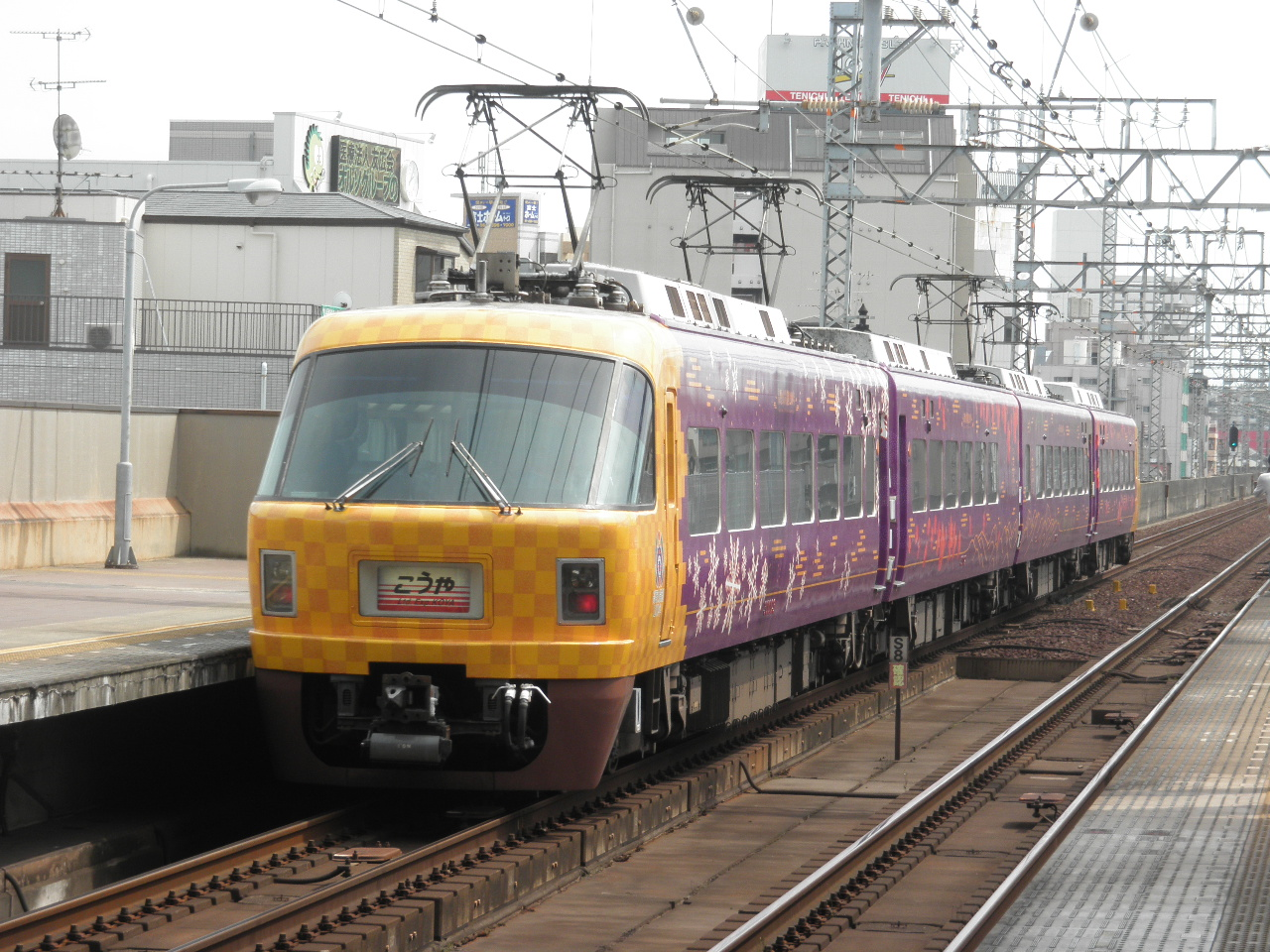
Set 30003 in "Purple Koya" livery in May 2015
