= Koya Line =

Railway line in Osaka Prefecture and Wakayama Prefecture, Japan

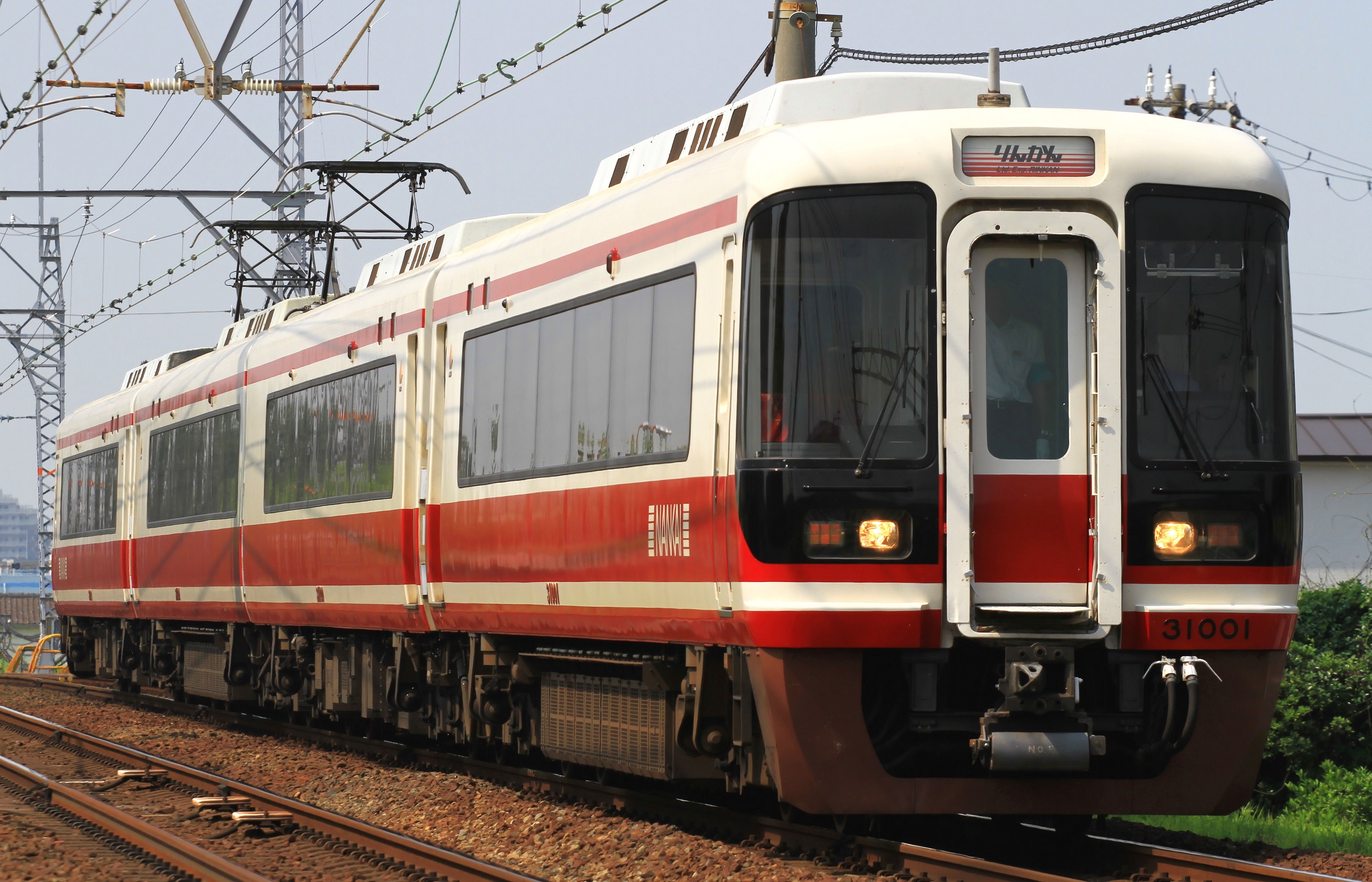
- A Rinkan limited express service

Overview
- Native name: 高野線
- Owner: Nankai Electric Railway
- Locale: Osaka Prefecture, Wakayama Prefecture
- Termini: Shiomibashi; Gokurakubashi

Service
- Type: Heavy rail; Commuter rail
- Depot(s): Chiyoda, Oharata

History
- Opened: 30 January, 1898; 128 years ago

Technical
- Line length: 64.5 km (40.1 mi)
- Num of tracks: Double (Shiomibashi - Hashimoto); Single (Hashimoto - Gokurakubashi)
- Track gauge: 1,067 mm (3 ft 6 in)
- Electrification: 1,500 V DC, overhead catenary
- Operating speed: 100 km/h (60 mph)

The Koya Line (高野線, Kōya-sen) is a railway line in Osaka Prefecture and Wakayama Prefecture, Japan, owned and operated by the Nankai Electric Railway, a private railway operator. It connects Osaka and Koyasan, the capital of the Japanese Buddhist sect Shingon, via the suburbs of Osaka, such as Sakai, Osakasayama, Tondabayashi and Kawachinagano in Osaka Prefecture and Hashimoto and Kōya in Wakayama Prefecture. To distinguish it from other Nankai Lines, the Kōya Line is indicated with pictograms of coniferous-like trees which bring to mind Mount Kōya, or with the line colour, green.

For historical reasons, the line formally begins at Shiomibashi Station in Osaka and crosses the Nankai Main Line, the company's other main line, at Kishinosato-Tamade Station, though operationally it starts at Namba Station together with the Nankai Line, diverges at Kishinosato-Tamade Station and goes to Gokurakubashi Station, to connect to Koyasan through Nankai Cable Line.

The section from Shiomibashi to Kishinosato-Tamade, called the Shiomibashi Line (汐見橋線), has trains operating only in between those two stations. The section from Hashimoto to Gokurakubashi and the Koyasan Cable is named the "Koya Flower Railway" (こうや花鉄道) by operating a sightseeing train "Tenku".

== History ==
The Koya Railway opened the Shiomibashi to Sayama section between 1898 and 1900, and extended the line to Kawachinagano in 1902. That section was electrified at 600 V DC in 1912. All further extensions were electrified when opened.

The Kawachinagano - Mikkaichicho section opened in 1914, and the line was extended to Hashimoto the following year. In 1922, the company merged with Nankai, and the Hashimoto to Gokurakubashi section opened in 1929.

Double-tracking of the line commenced in 1924, reaching Kawachinagano in 1938. The line voltage was increased to 1,500 V DC in 1973, and the following year, double-tracking reached Mikkaichicho, and Hashimoto in 1995.

== Service patterns ==
Local (各駅停車, Kakueki Teisha)
Between Namba and Sakaihigashi, Kitanoda, Kongō, Chiyoda, Kawachinagano, Miikkaichichō, Rinkanden-entoshi or Hashimoto, and between Hashimoto and Kōyashita or Gokurakubashi.

Semi-Express (準急, Junkyū)
All the southbound trains are operated from Namba to Izumi-Chūō on the Semboku Line. On weekday mornings, northbound trains for Namba are operated from Kawachinagano and Chiyoda in addition to the through trains from the Semboku Line.

Sub Express (区間急行, Kukan Kyūkō)
Trains are operated between Namba and Kawachinagano, Miikkaichichō, Rinkanden-entoshi or Izumi-Chūō (Semboku Line).
Express (急行, Kyūkō)
Trains are operated mainly between Namba and Miikkaichichō, Rinkanden-entoshi or Hashimoto. Several trains are operated between Namba and Kōyashita or Gokurakubashi.

Rapid Express (快速急行, Kaisoku Kyūkō)
All trains are operated between Namba and Gokurakubashi, and use a special "Zoomcar" rolling stock. On weekday evenings, southbound trains for Hashimoto from Namba are operated using other rolling stock.

Limited Express (特急, Tokkyū)
The Kōya (こうや) operates between Namba and Gokurakubashi, and the Rinkan (りんかん) between Namba and Hashimoto.
From December 5, 2015, Semboku Liner (泉北ライナー) services also commenced between Namba and Izumi-Chūō (Semboku Line). All seats on Limited Express trains are reserved.

Sightseeing train Tenku (観光列車「天空」)
From July 3, 2009, trains operate between Hashimoto and Gokurakubashi daily except Wednesdays and Thursdays from March until November, and on Saturdays, Sundays and national holidays from December until February. They stop at Kamuro and Kudoyama.

- For fare calculation, the distance between Tengachaya and Tezukayama is defined as 1.8 km.

== Stations ==
=== Namba - Kishinosato-Tamade - Gokurakubashi ===
Legends:

- S: Semi-Express
- U: Sub-Express
- E: Express
- R: Rapid Express
- T: Tenkū
- L: Limited Express
- ● : All trains stop.
- ｜: All trains pass.
- ◆ : Extra Limited Express trains originating at Hashimoto stop here
- ▲ - Semboku Liner No Stop

Line name	No.	Station	Japanese	Distance (km)		S	U	E	R	T	L	Transfers	Location	
Line name	No.	Station	Japanese		from Shiomibashi	S	U	E	R	T	L	Transfers	Location	
Nankai Main Line	NK01	Namba	難波	(3.9)	-	●	●	●	●		●	Osaka Metro: Midosuji Line (M20); Yotsubashi Line (Y15); Sennichimae Line (S16); A Kintetsu Namba Line (A01: Osaka Namba) Hanshin Namba Line (HS41: Osaka Namba) JR West Kansai Main Line (Yamatoji Line) (JR-Q17:JR Namba)	Chūō-ku, Osaka	Osaka Prefecture
Nankai Main Line	NK02	Imamiyaebisu	今宮戎	(3.0)	-	｜	｜	｜	｜		｜		Naniwa-ku, Osaka	Osaka Prefecture
Nankai Main Line	NK03	Shin-Imamiya	新今宮	(2.5)	-	●	●	●	●		●	JR West: Osaka Loop Line (JR-O19); Kansai Main Line (Yamatoji Line) (JR-Q19); Osaka Metro (Dōbutsuen-mae): Midosuji Line (M22); Sakaisuji Line (K19); Hankai Tramway Hankai Line (HN52: Shin-Imamiya-Ekimae)	Nishinari-ku, Osaka	Osaka Prefecture
Nankai Main Line	NK04	Haginochaya	萩ノ茶屋	(1.9)	-	｜	｜	｜	｜		｜		Nishinari-ku, Osaka	Osaka Prefecture
Nankai Main Line	NK05	Tengachaya	天下茶屋	(0.9)	-	●	●	●	●		●	Osaka Metro Sakaisuji Line (K20)	Nishinari-ku, Osaka	Osaka Prefecture
Nankai Main Line	NK06	Kishinosato-Tamade	岸里玉出	0.0	4.6	｜	｜	｜	｜		｜	Nankai Main Line; Shiomibashi Line	Nishinari-ku, Osaka	Osaka Prefecture
↓ Through services to/from Shiomibashi via the Shiomibashi Line ↓
Kōya Line	NK51	Tezukayama	帝塚山	1.1	5.7	｜	｜	｜	｜		｜		Sumiyoshi-ku, Osaka	Osaka Prefecture
Kōya Line	NK52	Sumiyoshihigashi	住吉東	2.0	6.6	｜	｜	｜	｜		｜	Hankai Tramway Uemachi Line (HN09: Kaminoki)	Sumiyoshi-ku, Osaka	Osaka Prefecture
Kōya Line	NK53	Sawanochō	沢ノ町	2.9	7.5	｜	｜	｜	｜		｜		Sumiyoshi-ku, Osaka	Osaka Prefecture
Kōya Line	NK54	Abikomae	我孫子前	3.5	8.1	｜	｜	｜	｜		｜		Sumiyoshi-ku, Osaka	Osaka Prefecture
Kōya Line	NK55	Asakayama	浅香山	4.8	9.4	｜	｜	｜	｜		｜		Sakai-ku, Sakai	Osaka Prefecture
Kōya Line	NK56	Sakaihigashi	堺東	6.4	11.0	●	●	●	●		▲		Sakai-ku, Sakai	Osaka Prefecture
Kōya Line	NK57	Mikunigaoka	三国ヶ丘	7.9	12.5	●	｜	｜	｜		｜	JR West Hanwa Line (JR-R29)	Sakai-ku, Sakai	Osaka Prefecture
Kōya Line	NK58	Mozuhachiman	百舌鳥八幡	8.8	13.4	●	｜	｜	｜		｜		Sakai-ku, Sakai	Osaka Prefecture
Kōya Line	NK59	Nakamozu	中百舌鳥	9.5	14.1	●	｜	｜	｜		｜	Semboku Line (through service) Osaka Metro Midosuji Line (M30)	Kita-ku, Sakai	Osaka Prefecture
Kōya Line	NK60	Shirasagi	白鷺	10.5	15.1	●	｜	｜	｜		｜		Kita-ku, Sakai	Osaka Prefecture
Kōya Line	NK61	Hatsushiba	初芝	12.0	16.6	●	｜	｜	｜		｜		Higashi-ku, Sakai	Osaka Prefecture
Kōya Line	NK62	Hagiharatenjin	萩原天神	12.9	17.5	●	｜	｜	｜		｜		Higashi-ku, Sakai	Osaka Prefecture
Kōya Line	NK63	Kitanoda	北野田	14.7	19.3	●	●	●	●		｜		Higashi-ku, Sakai	Osaka Prefecture
Kōya Line	NK64	Sayama	狭山	15.6	20.2	●	●	｜	｜		｜		Ōsakasayama	Osaka Prefecture
Kōya Line	NK65	Ōsakasayamashi	大阪狭山市	17.2	21.8	●	●	｜	｜		｜		Ōsakasayama	Osaka Prefecture
Kōya Line	NK66	Kongō	金剛	18.3	22.9	●	●	●	●		●		Ōsakasayama	Osaka Prefecture
Kōya Line	NK67	Takidani	滝谷	20.0	24.6	●	●	｜	｜		｜		Tondabayashi	Osaka Prefecture
Kōya Line	NK68	Chiyoda	千代田	21.3	25.9	●	●	｜	｜		｜		Kawachinagano	Osaka Prefecture
Kōya Line	NK69	Kawachinagano	河内長野	23.4	28.0	●	●	●	●		●	O Kintetsu Nagano Line (O23)	Kawachinagano	Osaka Prefecture
Kōya Line	NK70	Mikkaichichō	三日市町	25.1	29.7	●	●	●	●		｜		Kawachinagano	Osaka Prefecture
Kōya Line	NK71	Mikanodai	美加の台	26.7	31.3		●	●	●		｜		Kawachinagano	Osaka Prefecture
Kōya Line	NK72	Chihayaguchi	千早口	28.6	33.2		●	●	｜		｜		Kawachinagano	Osaka Prefecture
Kōya Line	NK73	Amami	天見	30.3	34.9		●	●	｜		｜		Kawachinagano	Osaka Prefecture
Kōya Line	NK74	Kimitōge	紀見峠	34.0	38.6		●	●	｜		｜		Hashimoto	Wakayama Prefecture
Kōya Line	NK75	Rinkanden'entoshi	林間田園都市	35.3	39.9		●	●	●		●		Hashimoto	Wakayama Prefecture
Kōya Line	NK76	Miyukitsuji	御幸辻	37.3	41.9			●	●		｜		Hashimoto	Wakayama Prefecture
Kōya Line	NK77	Hashimoto	橋本	40.1	44.7			●	●	●	●	JR West Wakayama Line	Hashimoto	Wakayama Prefecture
Kōya Line	NK78	Kii-Shimizu	紀伊清水	43.2	47.8			●	●	｜	｜		Hashimoto	Wakayama Prefecture
Kōya Line	NK79	Kamuro	学文路	45.8	50.4			●	●	●	◆		Hashimoto	Wakayama Prefecture
Kōya Line	NK80	Kudoyama	九度山	47.6	52.2			●	●	●	◆		Kudoyama, Ito District	Wakayama Prefecture
Kōya Line	NK81	Kōyashita	高野下	49.6	54.2			●	●	｜	｜		Kudoyama, Ito District	Wakayama Prefecture
Kōya Line	NK82	Shimo-Kosawa	下古沢	51.3	55.9			●	●	｜	｜		Kudoyama, Ito District	Wakayama Prefecture
Kōya Line	NK83	Kami-Kosawa	上古沢	53.0	57.6			●	●	｜	｜		Kudoyama, Ito District	Wakayama Prefecture
Kōya Line	NK84	Kii-Hosokawa	紀伊細川	56.0	60.6			●	●	｜	｜		Kōya, Ito District	Wakayama Prefecture
Kōya Line	NK85	Kii-Kamiya	紀伊神谷	58.4	63.0			●	●	｜	｜		Kōya, Ito District	Wakayama Prefecture
Kōya Line	NK86	Gokurakubashi	極楽橋	59.9	64.5			●	●	●	●	Cable Line	Kōya, Ito District	Wakayama Prefecture

=== Shiomibashi - Kishinosato-Tamade ===
The section is known as the Shiomibashi Line (汐見橋線).

No.	Station	Japanese	Distance (km)	Transfers	Location	
NK06-5	Shiomibashi	汐見橋	0.0	Osaka Metro Sennichimae Line (S15: Sakuragawa); Hanshin Namba Line (HS42: Sakuragawa)	Naniwa-ku, Osaka	Osaka Prefecture
NK06-4	Ashiharachō	芦原町	0.9	JR West Osaka Loop Line (JR-O17: Ashiharabashi)	Naniwa-ku, Osaka	Osaka Prefecture
NK06-3	Kizugawa	木津川	1.6		Nishinari-ku, Osaka	Osaka Prefecture
NK06-2	Tsumori	津守	2.6		Nishinari-ku, Osaka	Osaka Prefecture
NK06-1	Nishi-Tengachaya	西天下茶屋	3.6		Nishinari-ku, Osaka	Osaka Prefecture
NK06	Kishinosato-Tamade	岸里玉出	4.6	Nankai Main Line; Koya Line	Nishinari-ku, Osaka	Osaka Prefecture

== Rolling stock ==
As of 1 October 2026, the line uses the following rolling stock.

=== Limited express ===
- 30000 series since 1983
- 11000 series since 1992
- 31000 series since 1999
- 2200 series Tenku since 2009

=== Mountainous use ===
- 2000 series since 1990
- 2300 series since 2005

=== General commuter ===
- 6000 series since 1962
- 6200 series since 1974
- 6300 series since 1996
- 8300 series since 2019
- 8000 series since 2024
