= Hashimoto Station (Wakayama) =

Railway station in Hashimoto, Wakayama Prefecture, Japan

Hashimoto Station 橋本駅
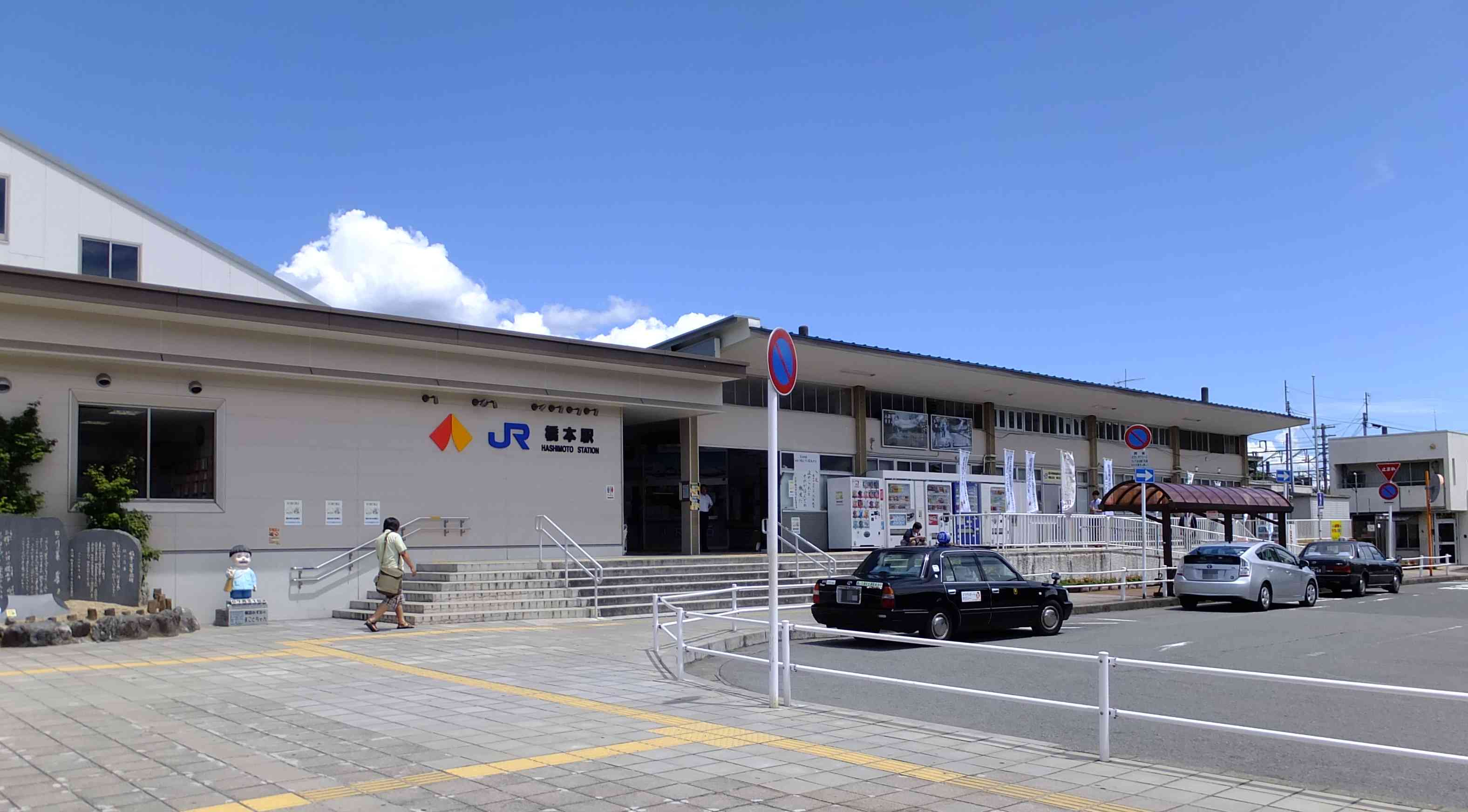

General information
- Location: 4-51, Kosada Itchome, Hashimoto-shi, Wakayama-ken 648-0065; Japan
- Coordinates: 34°19′5.12″N 135°36′53.69″E
- Operator: West Japan Railway Company; Nankai Electric Railway
- Lines: T Wakayama Line; Kōya Line
- Platforms: 2 island + 1 side platform
- Connections: Bus terminal

Other information
- Status: Staffed (Midori no Madoguchi )
- Station code: NK77 (Nankai)

History
- Opened: 11 April 1898

Passengers
- FY2019: 7544 daily (JR); 7544 Nankai
Location
- Location within Wakayama Prefecture Location within Japan

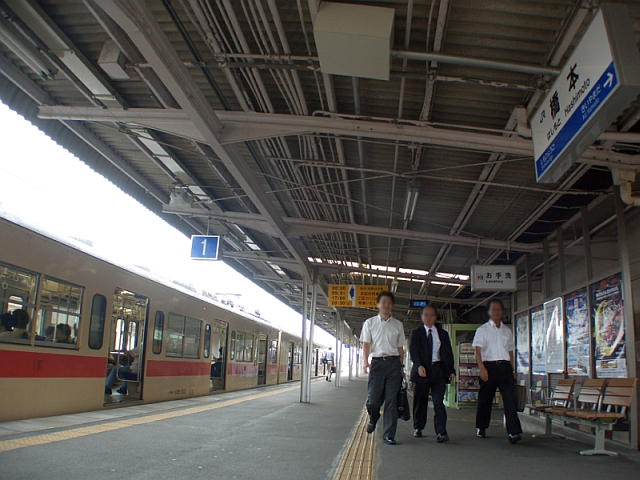
Hashimoto Station platform, August 2006

Hashimoto Station (橋本駅, Hashimoto-eki) is an interchange passenger railway station located in the city of Hashimoto, Wakayama Prefecture, Japan, operated by the West Japan Railway Company (JR West) and the private Nankai Electric Railway.

== Lines ==
Hashimoto Station is served by the Wakayama Line and is located 45.1 kilometers from the terminus of the line at Ōji Station. It is also served by the Nankai Kōya Line, and is located 44.7 kilometers from the terminus of that line at Shiomibashi Station and 44.0 kilometers from Namba Station.

== Station layout ==
The station consists of two island platforms and one side platform connected to the station building by a footbridge. The side platform and the south island platform are used for the JR Wakayama Line (tracks 1, 2, 3). The north island platform is used by the Nankai Railway Kōya Line (tracks 4, 5). The station is staffed and has a Midori no Madoguchi ticket office.

=== Platforms ===
1	■ T Wakayama Line	for Kokawa and Wakayama
2	■ T Wakayama Line	forGojō and Ōji returning for Kokawa and Wakayama
3	■ T Wakayama Line	for Gojō and Ōji (morning, evening)
4, 5	■ Nankai Railway Kōya Line	for Namba for Gokurakubashi and Kōyasan

== Adjacent stations ==
«	Service	»
JR West Wakayama Line
Shimohyōgo	Local (普通)	Kii-Yamada
Shimohyōgo	Rapid Service (快速)	Kii-Yamada
Nankai Railway Koya Line (NK77)
Miyukitsuji (NK76)	Local (各駅停車)	Kii-Shimizu (NK78)
Miyukitsuji (NK76)	Express (急行)	Kii-Shimizu (NK78)
Miyukitsuji (NK76)	Rapid Express (快速急行)	Kii-Shimizu (NK78)
Terminus	Sightseeing train "Tenku" (観光列車「天空」)	Kamuro (NK79)
Rinkanden'entoshi (NK75)	Limited Express "Koya" (特急「こうや」)	Gokurakubashi (NK86)
Rinkanden'entoshi (NK75)	Limited Express "Rinkan" (特急「りんかん」)	Terminus

== History ==
Hashimoto Station opened on 11 April 1898 as a station on the Kiwa Railway. The Kiwa Railway became part of the Kansai Railway in 1904, which was nationalized in 1907. On 11 March 1915, the Takano Mountain Railway connected to Hashimoto Station, and changed its name to the Osaka Takano Railway a month later. The Osaka Takano Railway merged with the Nankai Railway Company in 1922. In 1944, the Nankai Railway was forced to merge with Kintetsu per Japanese government orders. A freight train stopped at the station was bombed on 24 July 1945 by US military aircraft in World War II, resulting in five fatalities. In 1947, the Nankai Railway was spun out by Kintetsu to become an independent company once again.

== Passenger statistics ==
In fiscal 2019, the JR portion of the station was used by an average of 2209 passengers daily (boarding passengers only) and the Nankai portion of the station was used by 7544 passengers daily (boarding passengers only). .

== Surrounding area ==
- Hashimoto City Hall
- Wakayama Prefectural Kosadaoka Junior High School / Hashimoto High School
- Hashimoto City Hashimoto Junior High School
- Mount Koya

== See also ==
- List of railway stations in Japan
