= Gokurakubashi Station =

Railway station in Kōya, Wakayama Prefecture, Japan

Gokurakubashi Station 極楽橋駅
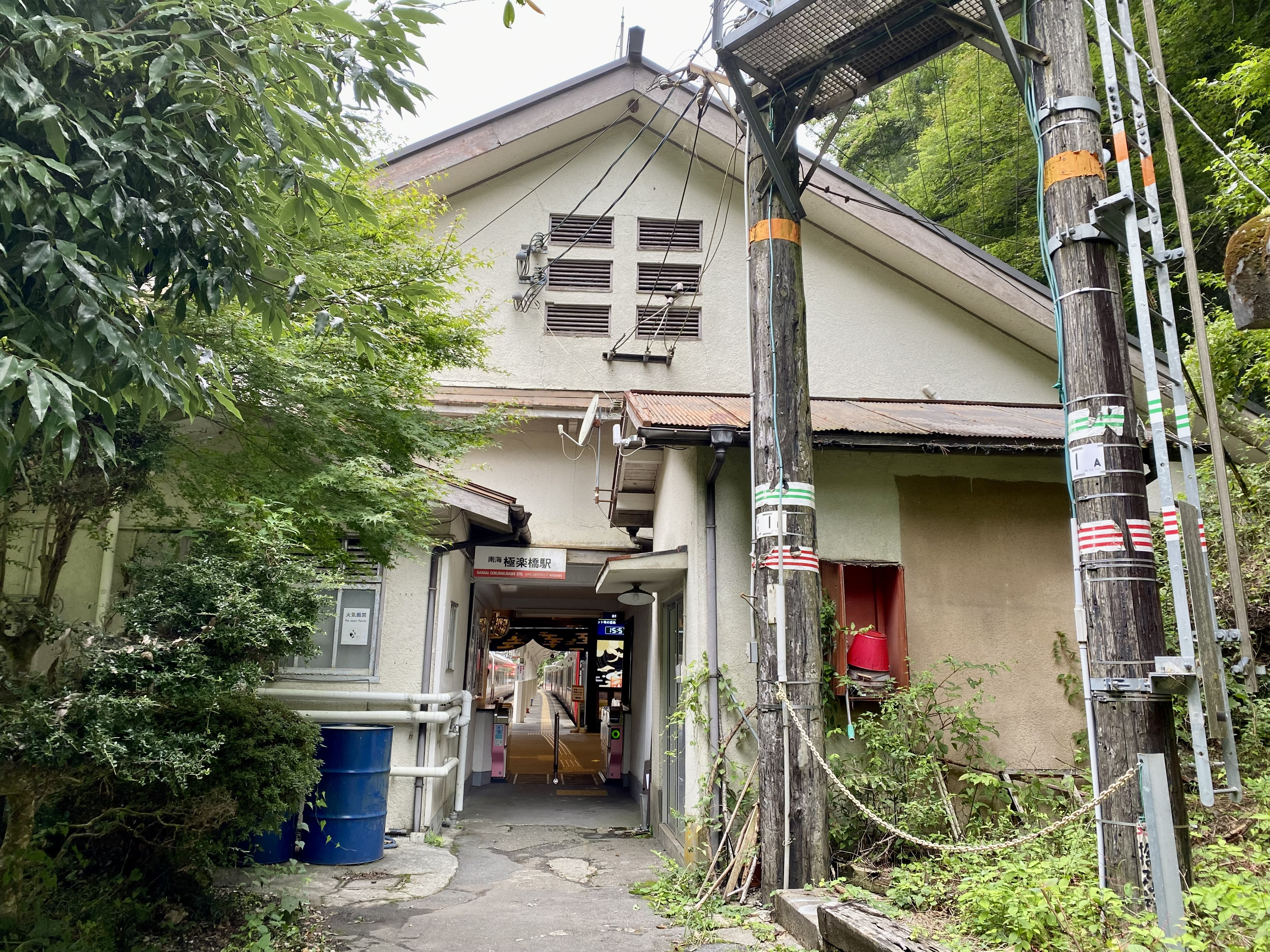
- Gokurakubashi Station in September 2020

General information
- Location: Kōyasan Kokuyūrin Dai8rinhan, Kōya-chō, Ito-gun, Wakayama-ken 648-0171; Japan
- Coordinates: 34°14′2.3″N 135°34′55.48″E
- Operator: Nankai Electric Railway
- Lines: Kōya Line; Cable Line
- Platforms: (Kōya Line): 2 bay platforms (Cable Line): 2 side platforms
- Connections

Other information
- Status: Staffed
- Station code: NK86
- Website: Official website

History
- Opened: 21 February 1929

Passengers
- FY2019: 56 daily

Services
Preceding station	Nankai Electric Railway	Following station
Kii-Kamiya towards Namba	Kōya Line Local Express Rapid Express	Terminus
Hashimoto towards Namba	Kōya	Terminus
Kudoyama towards Hashimoto	Tenkū	Terminus
Terminus	Cable Line	Kōyasan Terminus
Location
- Location within Wakayama Prefecture Location within Japan

Gokurakubashi Station (極楽橋駅, Gokurakubashi-eki) is a junction passenger railway station in located in the town of Kōya, Wakayama Prefecture, Japan, operated by the private railway company Nankai Electric Railway.

== Lines ==
Gokurakubashi Station is served by the Nankai Kōya Line, and is located 64.5 kilometers from the terminus of the line at Shiomibashi Station and 63.8 kilometers from Namba Station. It is also the terminus of the funicular Nankai Cable Line and is 0.8 kilometers from the opposing terminus at Kōyasan.

== Station layout ==
The station consists of two bay platforms serving four tracks, with all services for Hashimoto and Namba for the Nankai Kōya Line and two side platforms for the Nankai Cable Line. The station is staffed.

=== Platforms ===
1	■ Kōya Line	Local, Express, Rapid Express
2	■ Kōya Line	Local, Express, Rapid Express, Sightseeing train "Tenkū"
3	■ Kōya Line	Limited Express "Kōya"
4	■ Kōya Line	Limited Express "Kōya", Sightseeing train "Tenkū"

=== Cable Line ===
Left platform	■ Cable Line	for Kōyasan (Boarding passengers only)
Right platform	■ Cable Line	Disembarking passengers only

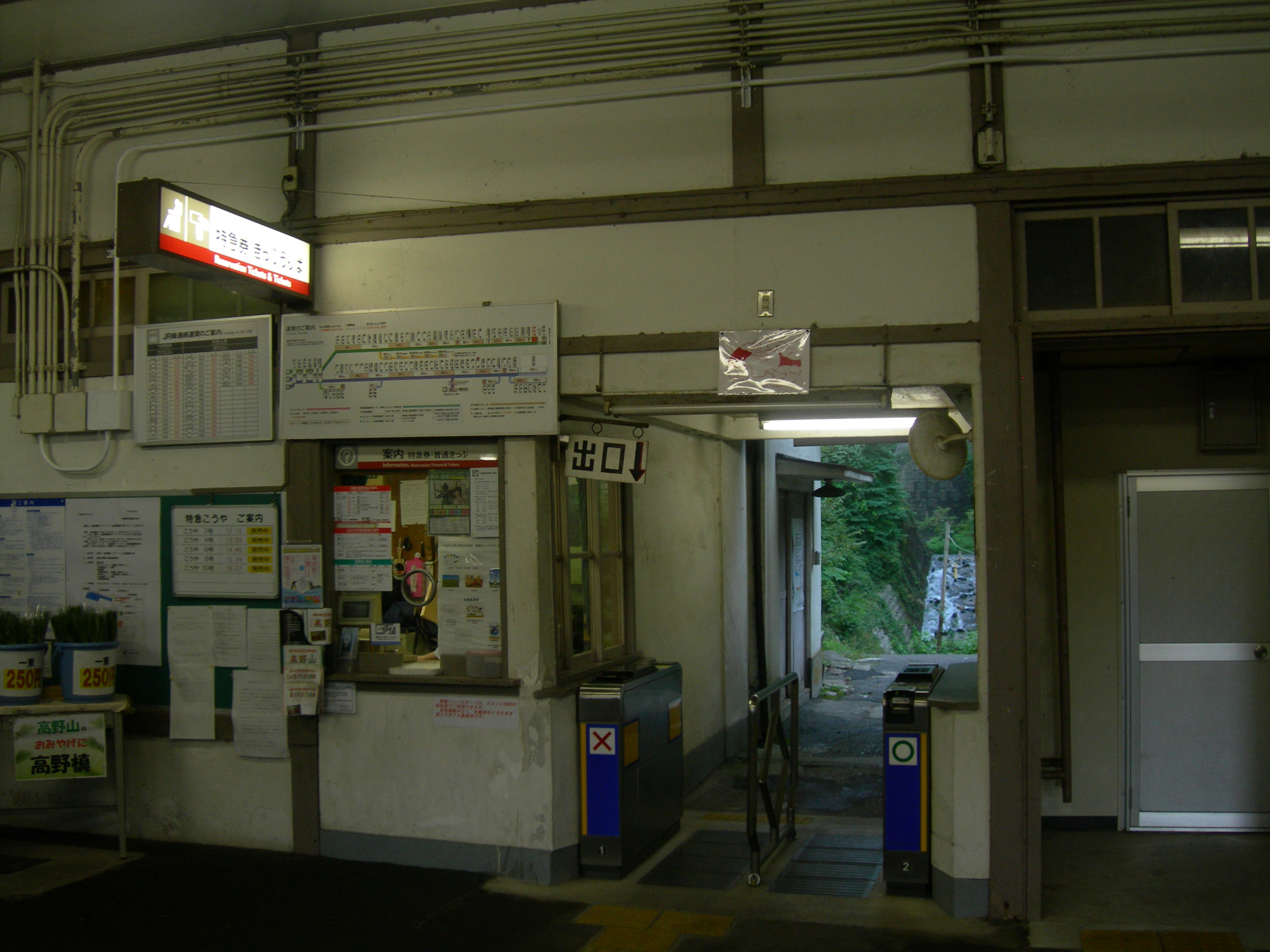
Ticket gates

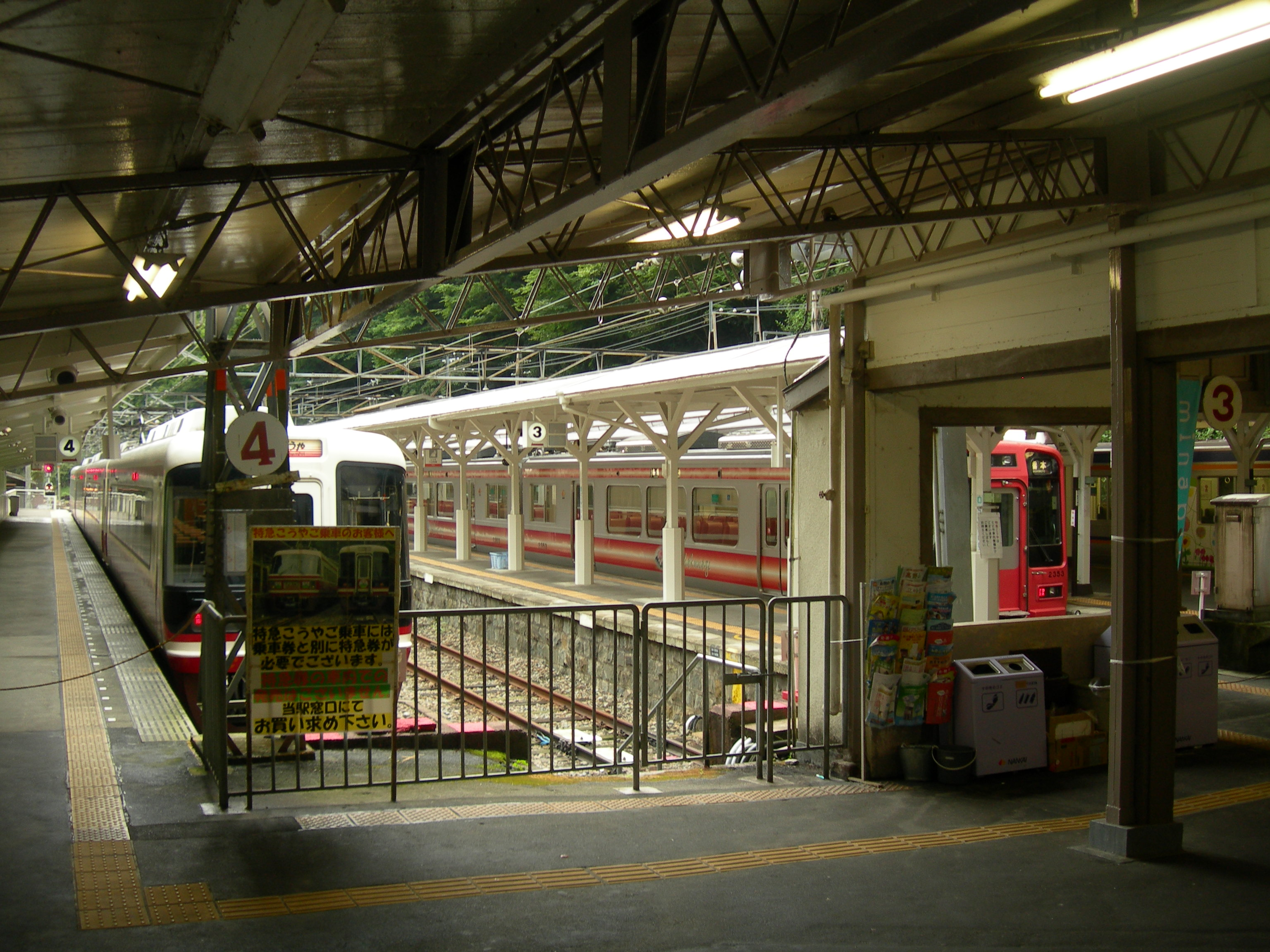
Platform of Kōya Line

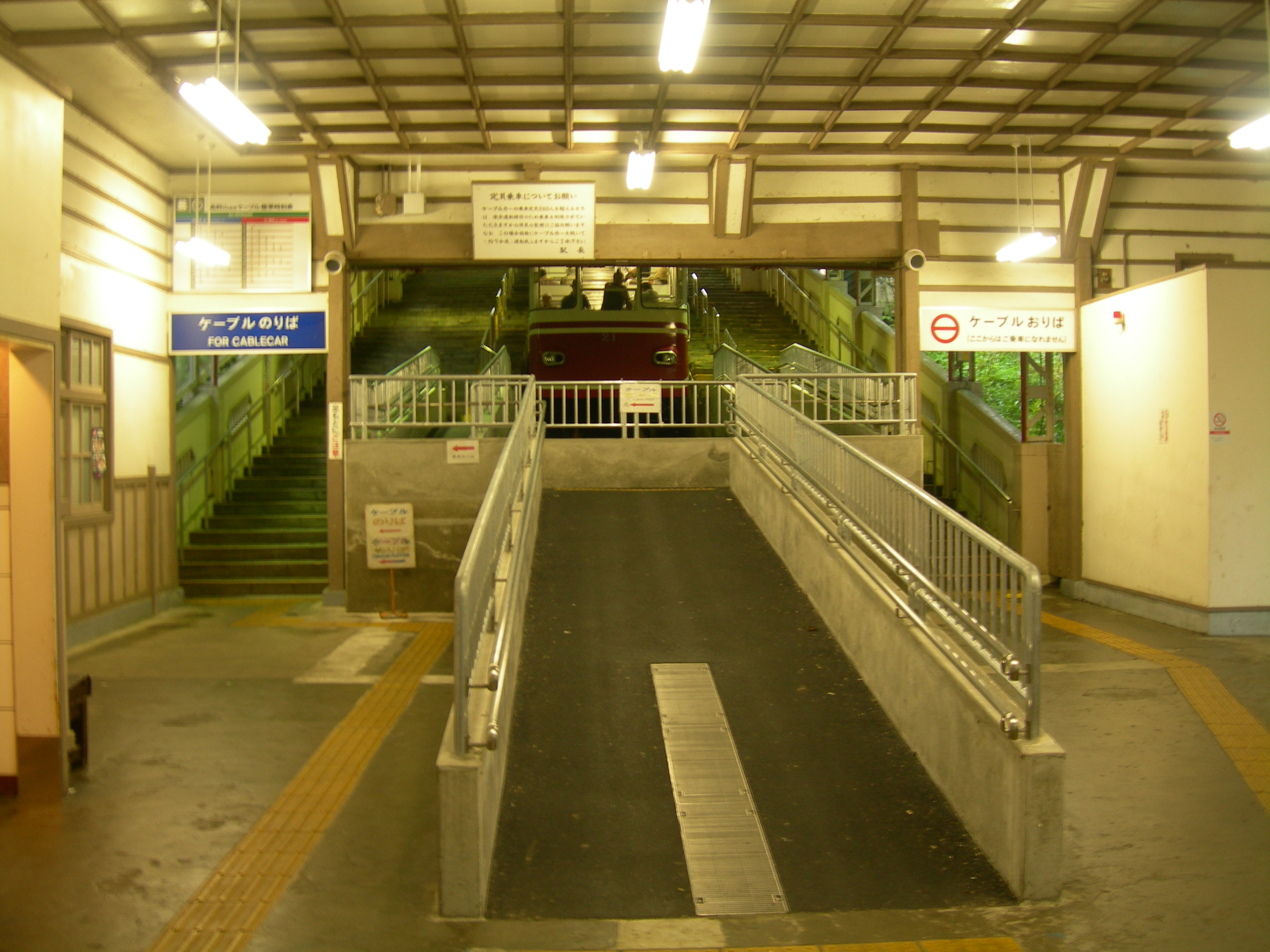
Platform of Cable Line

== History ==
Gokurakubashi Station opened on 21 February 1929.

== Passenger statistics ==
In fiscal 2019, the station was used by an average of 56 passengers daily (boarding passengers only).

== Surrounding area ==
- Sacred Sites and Pilgrimage Routes in the Kii Mountain Range
- Mount Kōya

== See also ==
- List of railway stations in Japan
