= Kōyasan Station =

Railway station in Kōya, Wakayama Prefecture, Japan

Kōyasan Station 高野山駅
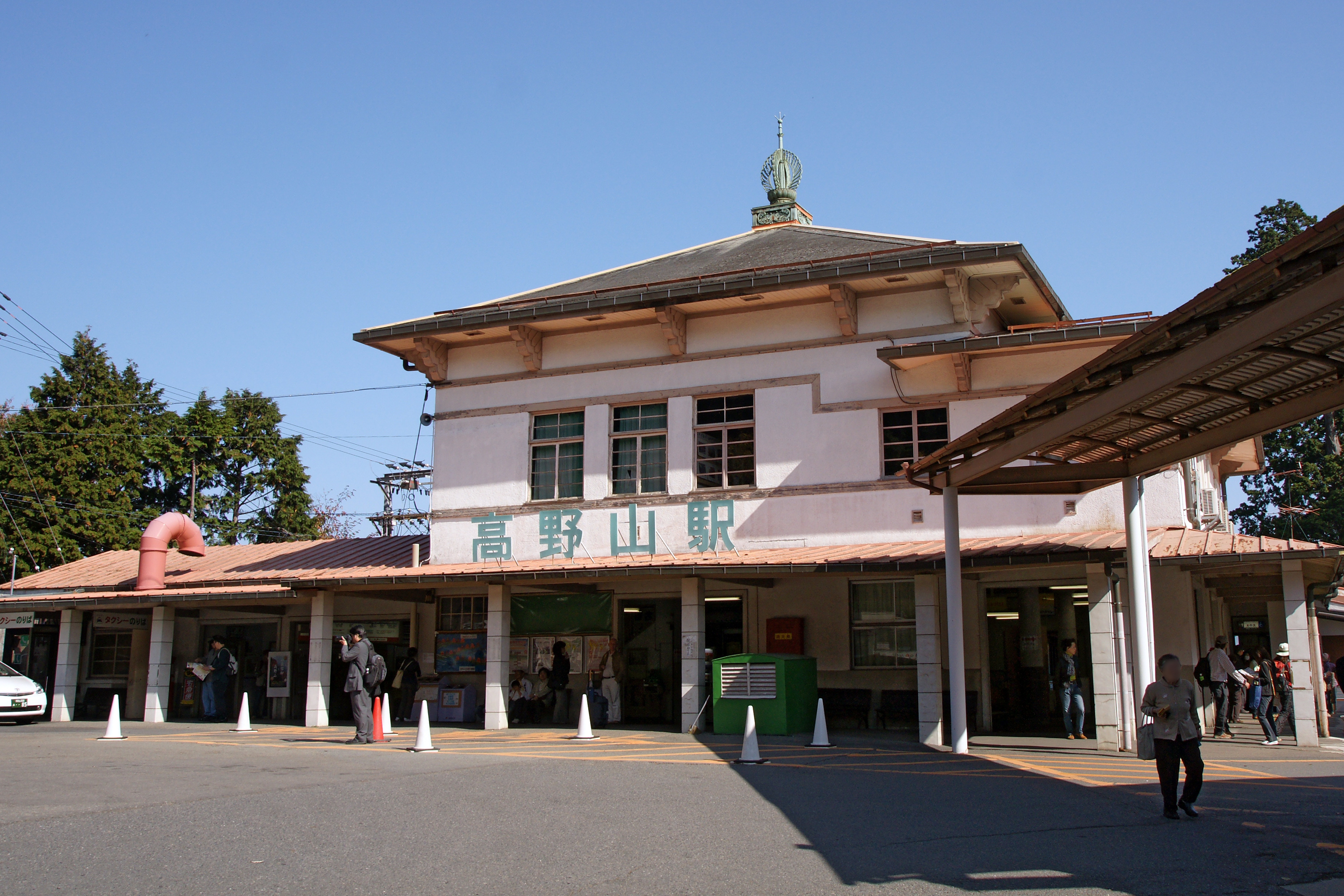
- Kōyasan Station, November 2016

General information
- Location: Kōyasan Kokuyūrin Dai9rinhan-no-ha, Kōya-chō, Ito-gun, Wakayama-ken 648-0211; Japan
- Coordinates: 34°13′39.53″N 135°34′38.46″E
- Operator: Nankai Electric Railway
- Line: Cable Line
- Distance: 0.8 km (0.50 miles) from Gokurakubashi
- Platforms: 1 bay platform
- Connections: Bus terminal

Other information
- Status: Staffed
- Station code: NK87
- Website: Official website

History
- Opened: 28 June 1930

Passengers
- FY2019: 2010 daily

Services
Preceding station	Nankai Electric Railway	Following station
Gokurakubashi Terminus	Cable Line	Terminus
Location
- Location within Wakayama Prefecture Location within Japan

Kōyasan Station (高野山駅, Kōyasan-eki) is a passenger railway station in the town of Kōya, Ito District, Wakayama Prefecture, Japan, operated by the private railway company Nankai Electric Railway.

== Lines ==
Kōyasan Station is the upper terminus of the funicular Nankai Cable Line, and is located 0.8 kilometers from the lower terminus of the line at Gokurakubashi Station.

== Station layout ==
The station consists of one bay platform. The station is staffed.

=== Platforms ===
Left platform	■ Cable Line	Gokurakubashi (transfer to Kōya Line for Hashimoto, Namba) (Boarding passengers only)
Right platform	■ Cable Line	Disembarking passengers only

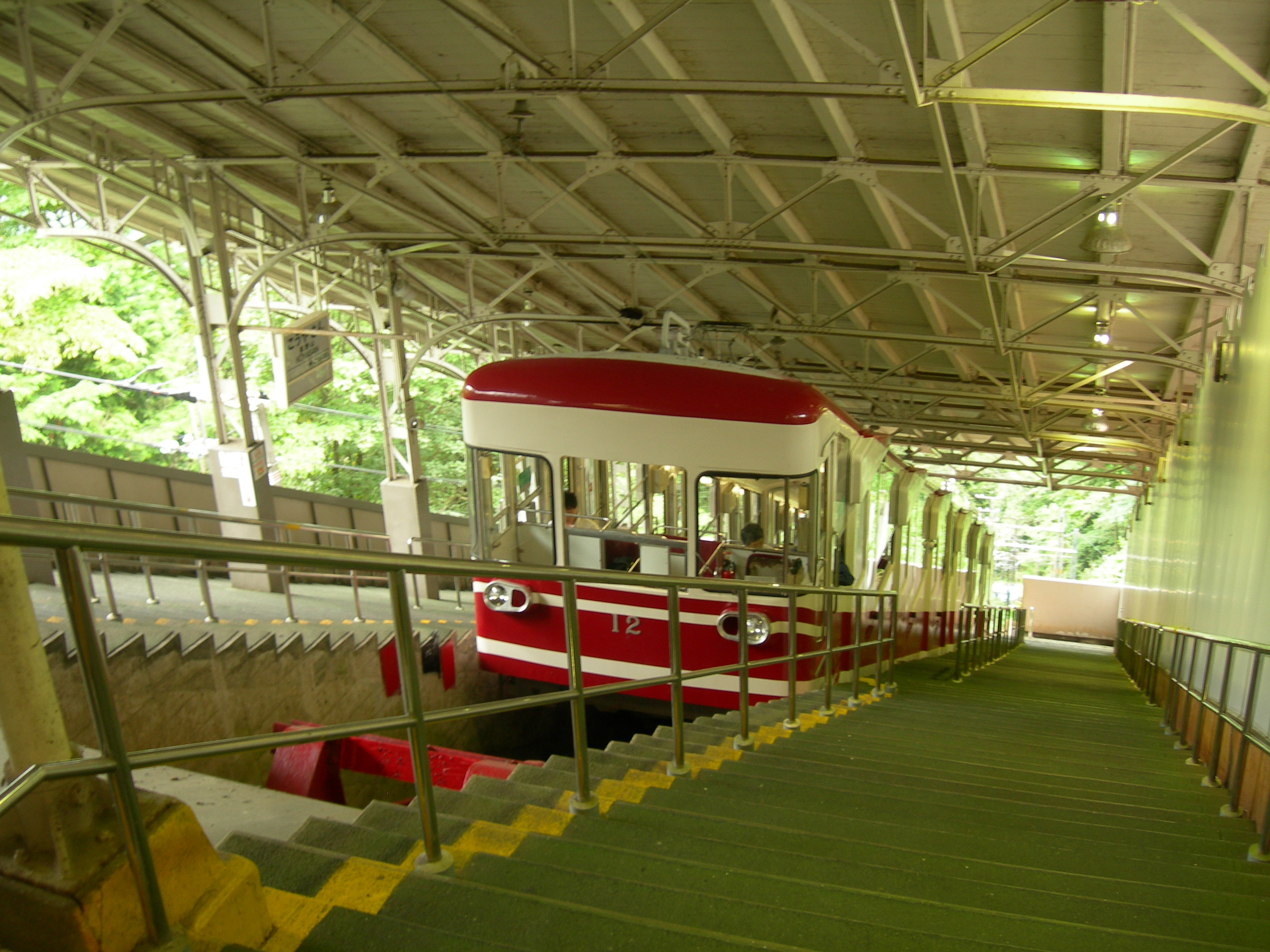
Platform

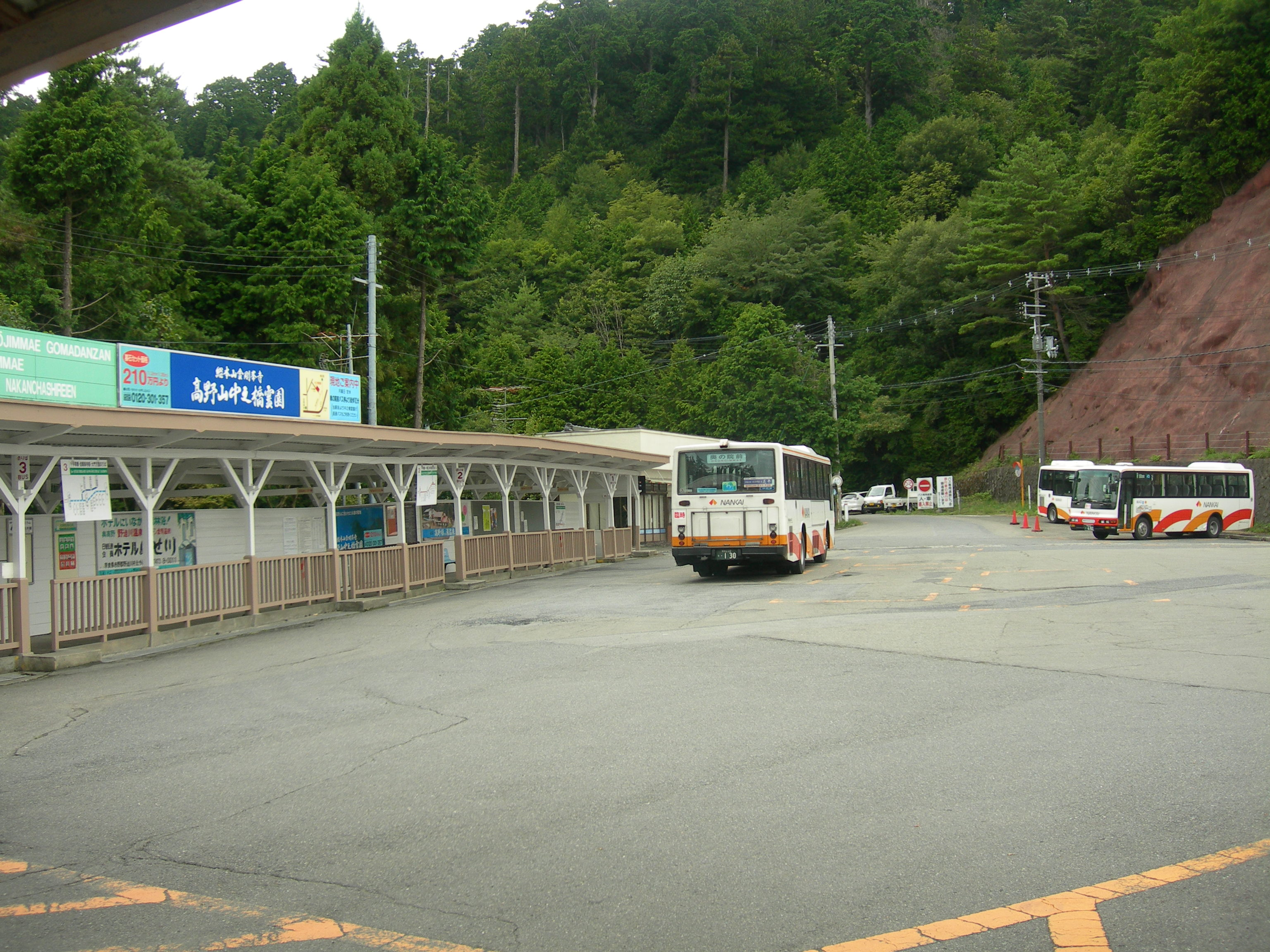
Bus terminal

== History ==
Kōyasan Station opened on June 28, 1930.

== Passenger statistics ==
In fiscal 2019, the station was used by an average of 2010 passengers daily (boarding passengers only).

== Surrounding area ==
In front of the station, there is a Nankai Rinkan Bus stop and a taxi stand.

=== Buses ===
- Passengers who get off at the station are unable to walk to Mount Koya as the road which connecting between the station and Mount Koya is reserved exclusively for buses. Therefore, passengers wishing go to Mount Koya must ride on the bus services available.

No	Via	Destination	Company	Note
Kōyasan＆Kumano Access Bus	Gomadanzan・Ryujin Onsen	Hongu Taishamae	Nankai Bus・Ryujin Jidōsha	
Koya Hanasaka Line[13]	Ichi-no-hashi guchi	Hanasaka	Nankai Bus	
Koyasannai Line[21]	Ichi-no-hashi guchi	Okunoin mae	Nankai Bus	
Koyasannai Line[22]	Ichi-no-hashi guchi	Okunoin mae	Nankai Bus	
Koyasannai Line[23]	Okunoin mae	Okunoin guchi	Nankai Bus	
Koyasannai Line[24]	Kondō mae	Sakura Tōge shita	Nankai Bus	
Senju Daimon Line[31]	Daitō guchi	Daimon-minami Chūshajō	Nankai Bus	
Senju Daimon Line[32]		Daimon-minami Chūshajō	Nankai Bus	
Koyasannai Line[33]		Kongōbu-ji mae	Nankai Bus	
Uguisu Line[34]		Naka-no-hashi Raien	Nankai Bus	

Reservation Bus

No	Via	Destination	Company	Note
Tatesato Line[11]	Non stop	Tatesato	Nankai Bus	
Koya Ryujin Line[12]	Non stop	Gomadanzan	Nankai Bus	

== See also ==
- List of railway stations in Japan
