= Shiomibashi Station =

Railway station in Osaka, Japan

Shiomibashi Station 汐見橋駅
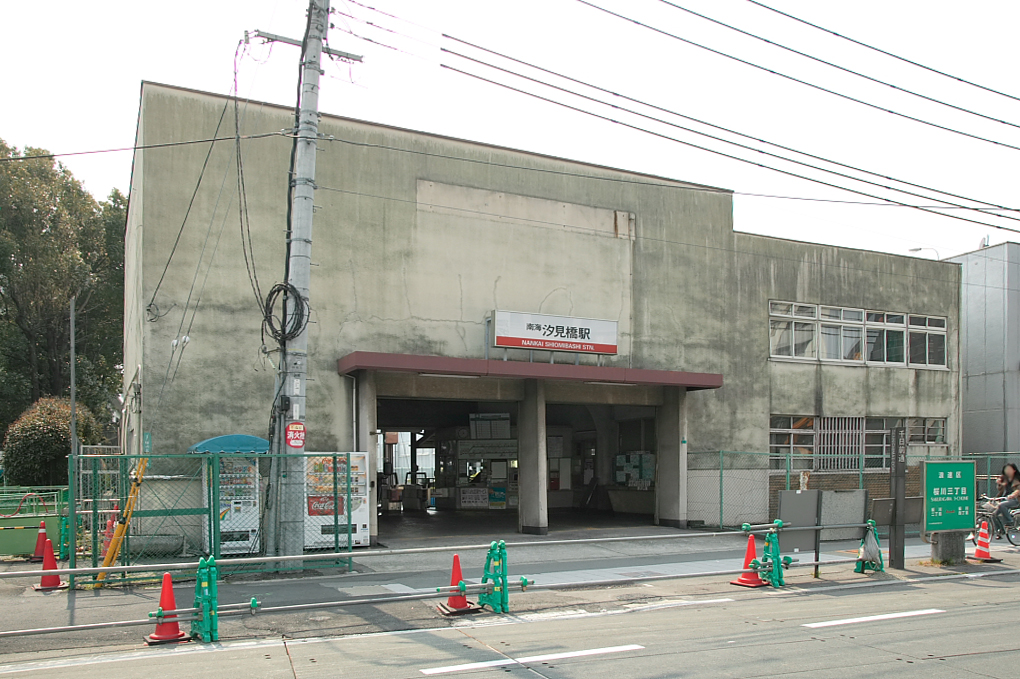
- Shiomibashi Station building in March 2007

General information
- Location: 3-8-74, Sakuragawa, Naniwa-ku, Osaka （大阪市浪速区桜川三丁目8番74号） Osaka Prefecture; Japan
- Coordinates: 34°40′5.66″N 135°29′10.2″E
- Operator: Nankai Electric Railway
- Line: Koya Line (Shiomibashi Line)
- Platforms: 1 island platform
- Connections: Bus stop

Other information
- Station code: NK06-5
- Website: Official website

History
- Opened: 1900
- Former names: Dōtonbori (until 1901)

Passengers
- 471 daily

Services
Preceding station	Nankai Electric Railway	Following station
Terminus	Kōya Line Shiomibashi Line	Ashiharachō towards Kishinosato-Tamade
Location
- Location within Japan

Shiomibashi Station (汐見橋駅, Shiomibashi-eki) is a train station in Naniwa-ku, Osaka, Osaka Prefecture, Japan, operated by the private railway operator Nankai Electric Railway.

== Lines ==
Shiomibashi Station is the terminus of the Koya Line (Shiomibashi Line), and has the station number "NK06-5".

== Layout ==
The station has an island platform with two tracks.

1	■ Koya Line (Shiomibashi Line)	for Kishinosato-Tamade
2	■ Koya Line (Shiomibashi Line)	for Kishinosato-Tamade

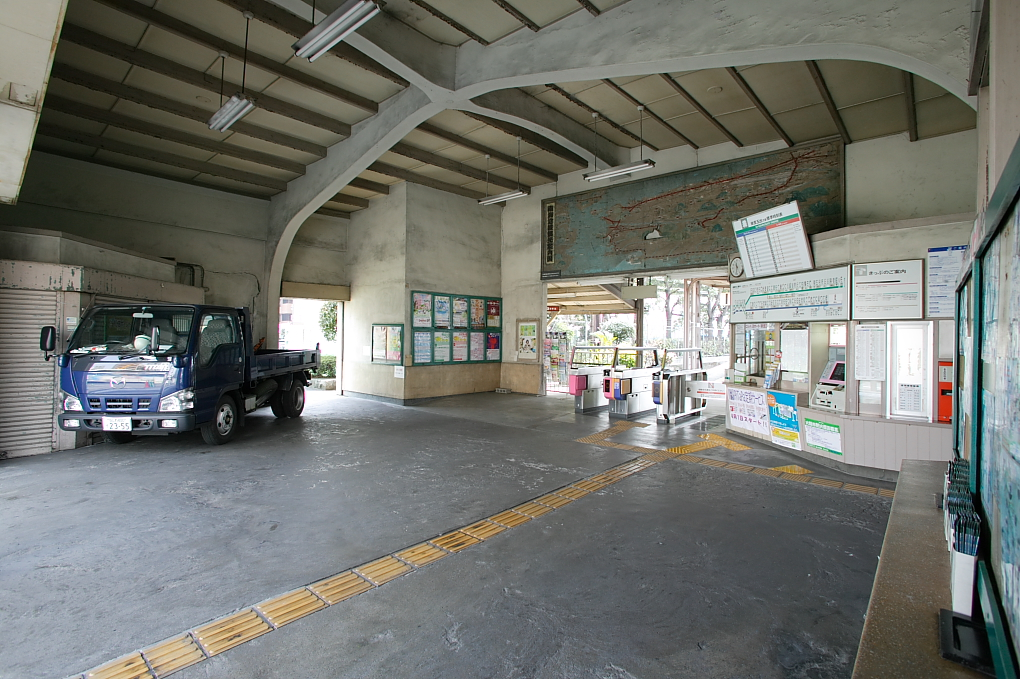
Ticket gates

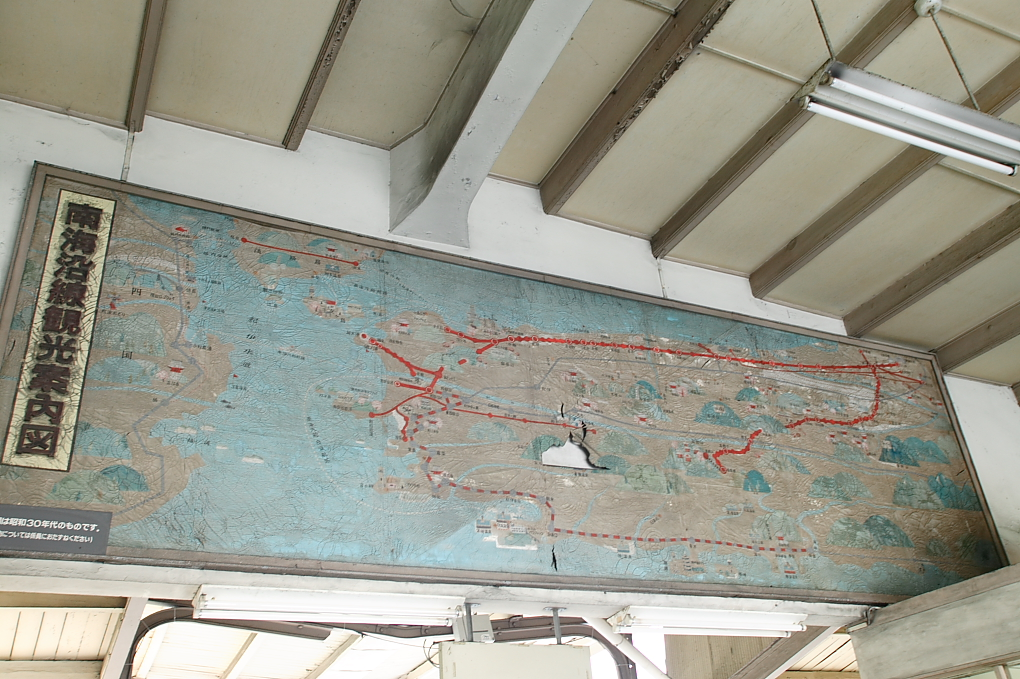
Old map

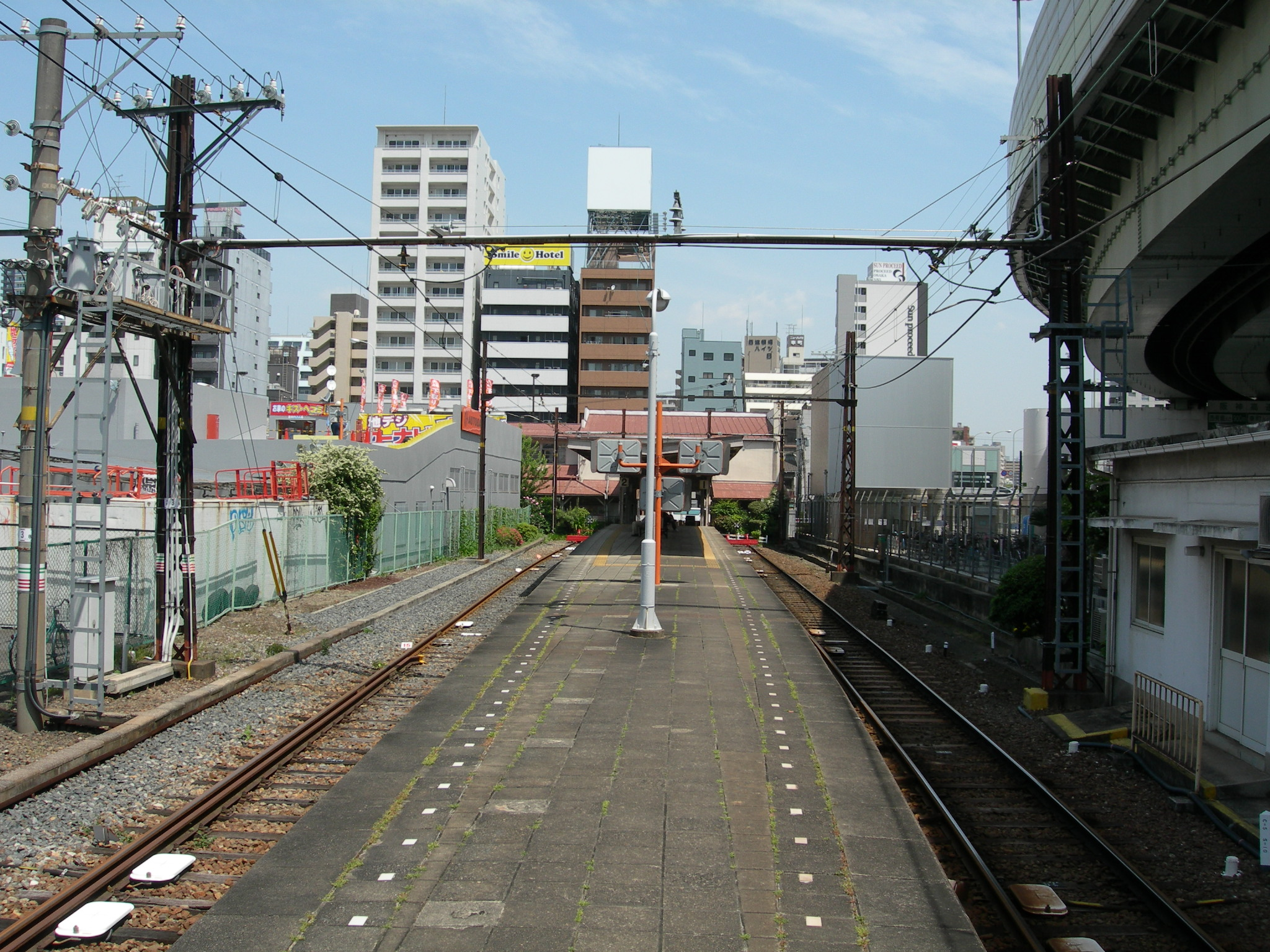
Island platform

== Surrounding area ==
- Sakuragawa Station (Osaka Metro Sennichimae Line, Hanshin Railway Hanshin Namba Line)
- Osaka Dome - 1 km away

== See also ==
- List of railway stations in Japan
