= Sayama (disambiguation) =

Sayama is the city of Saitama Prefecture, Japan.

Sayama may also refer to:

- Sayama (surname), Japanese surname
- Sayama Station, railway station located in the city of Ōsakasayama, Osaka Prefecture, Japan
- Seibu Sayama Line, railway line in Saitama Prefecture, Japan
- 4461 Sayama, minor planet
