= Sakai Station =

Railway station in Sakai, Japan

Sakai Station 堺駅
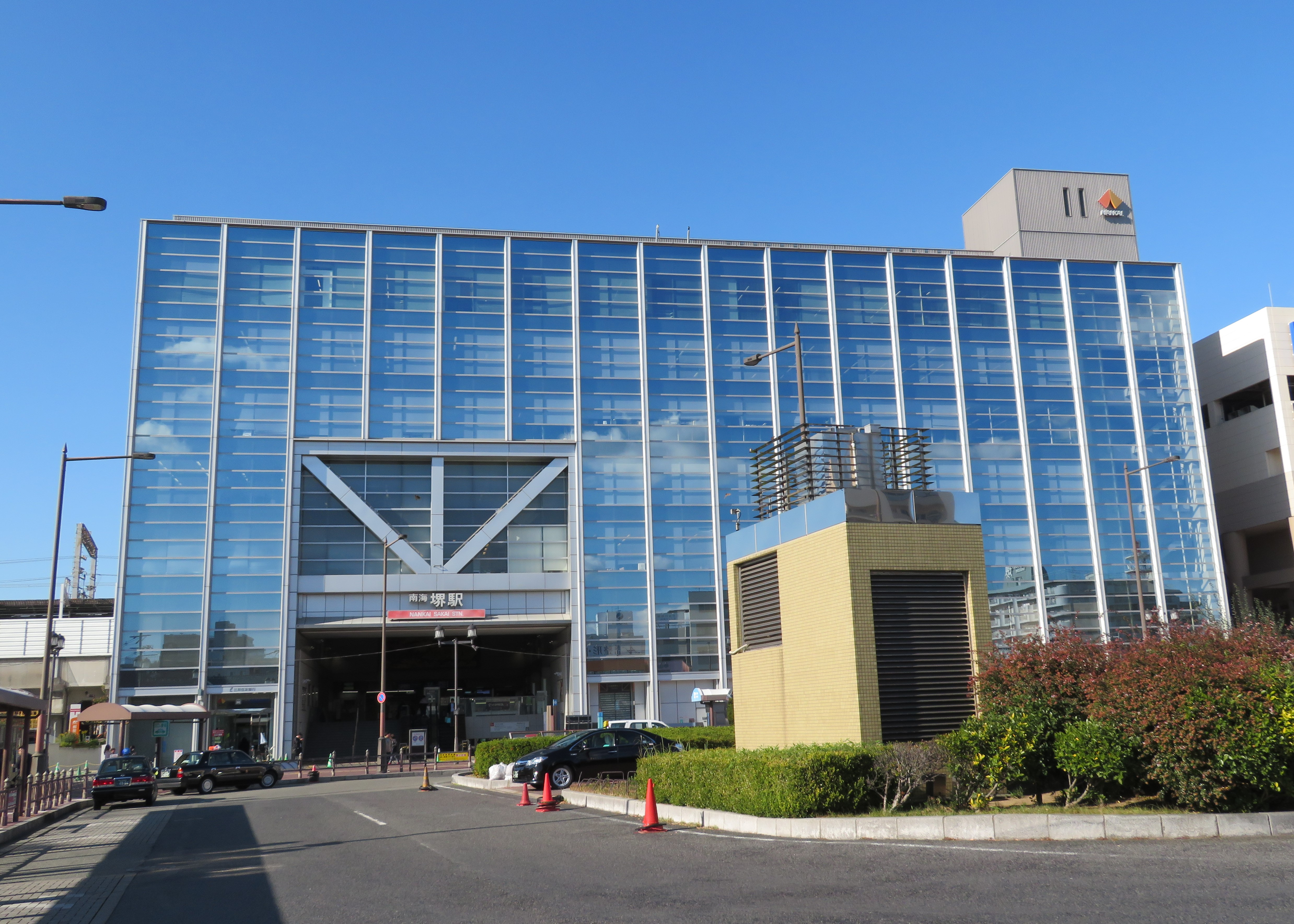
- Sakai Station east gate

General information
- Location: 22, Ebisujimachō 3-cho, Sakai-ku, Sakai-shi, Osaka-fu 590-0985; Japan
- Coordinates: 34°34′54.09″N 135°28′8.25″E
- Operator: Nankai Electric Railway
- Line: Nankai Main Line
- Distance: 9.8 km from Namba
- Platforms: 2 island platforms
- Connections: Bus terminal

Construction
- Structure type: Elevated

Other information
- Station code: NK11
- Website: Official website

History
- Opened: (Old station): 15 May 1888; 138 years ago (Current station): December 1997; 28 years ago
- Closed: (Old station): 1990s

Passengers
- 2019: 38,758 daily

Services
Preceding station	Nankai Electric Railway	Following station
Shichidō towards Namba	Nankai Main Line Local	Minato towards Wakayamashi
Tengachaya towards Namba	Nankai Main Line Semi-Express	Minato One-way operation
Tengachaya towards Namba	Nankai Main Line Sub. Express Express	Hagoromo towards Wakayamashi
Tengachaya towards Namba	Nankai Main Line Airport Express	Hagoromo towards Kansai Airport
Tengachaya towards Namba	Southern	Kishiwada towards Wakayamashi or Wakayamakō
Tengachaya towards Namba	Rapi:t β	Kishiwada towards Kansai Airport
Location
- Location within Osaka Prefecture Location within Japan

Sakai Station (堺駅, Sakai-eki) is a passenger railway station located in Sakai-ku, Sakai, Osaka Prefecture, Japan, operated by the private railway operator Nankai Electric Railway. It has the station number "NK11".

== Lines ==
Sakai Station is served by the Nankai Main Line, and is 9.8 kilometers (6.1 mi) from the terminus of the line at Nanba.

== Layout ==
The station consists of two elevated island platforms serving four tracks are located on the third level. Ticket gates are located in the center and the south; the center gates are connected with the east and west exits, and the south gates are with the south gate.

=== Platforms ===
1, 2	■ Nankai Main Line	for Wakayamashi and Kansai Airport
3, 4	■ Nankai Main Line	for Namba

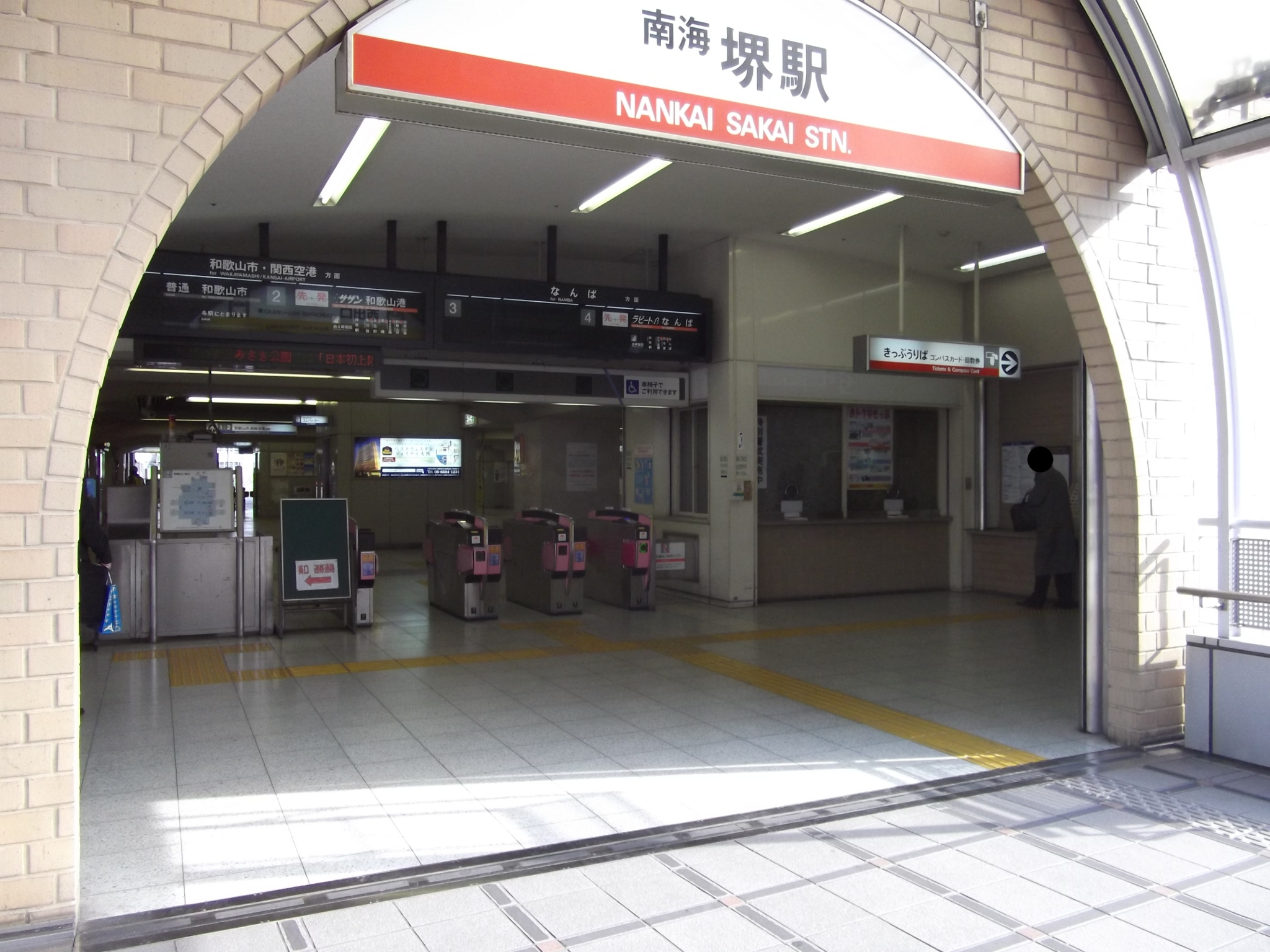
West gate

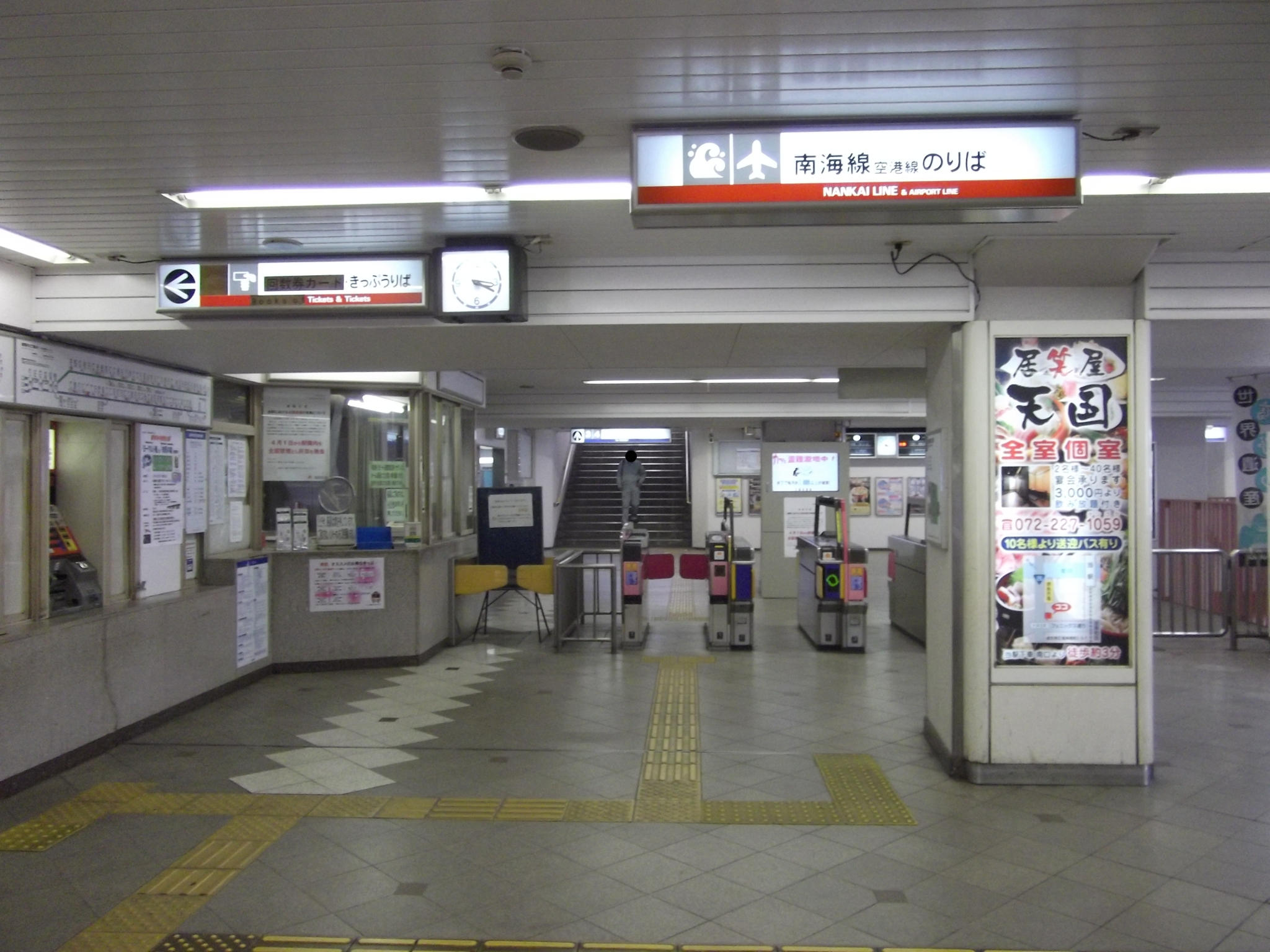
South gate

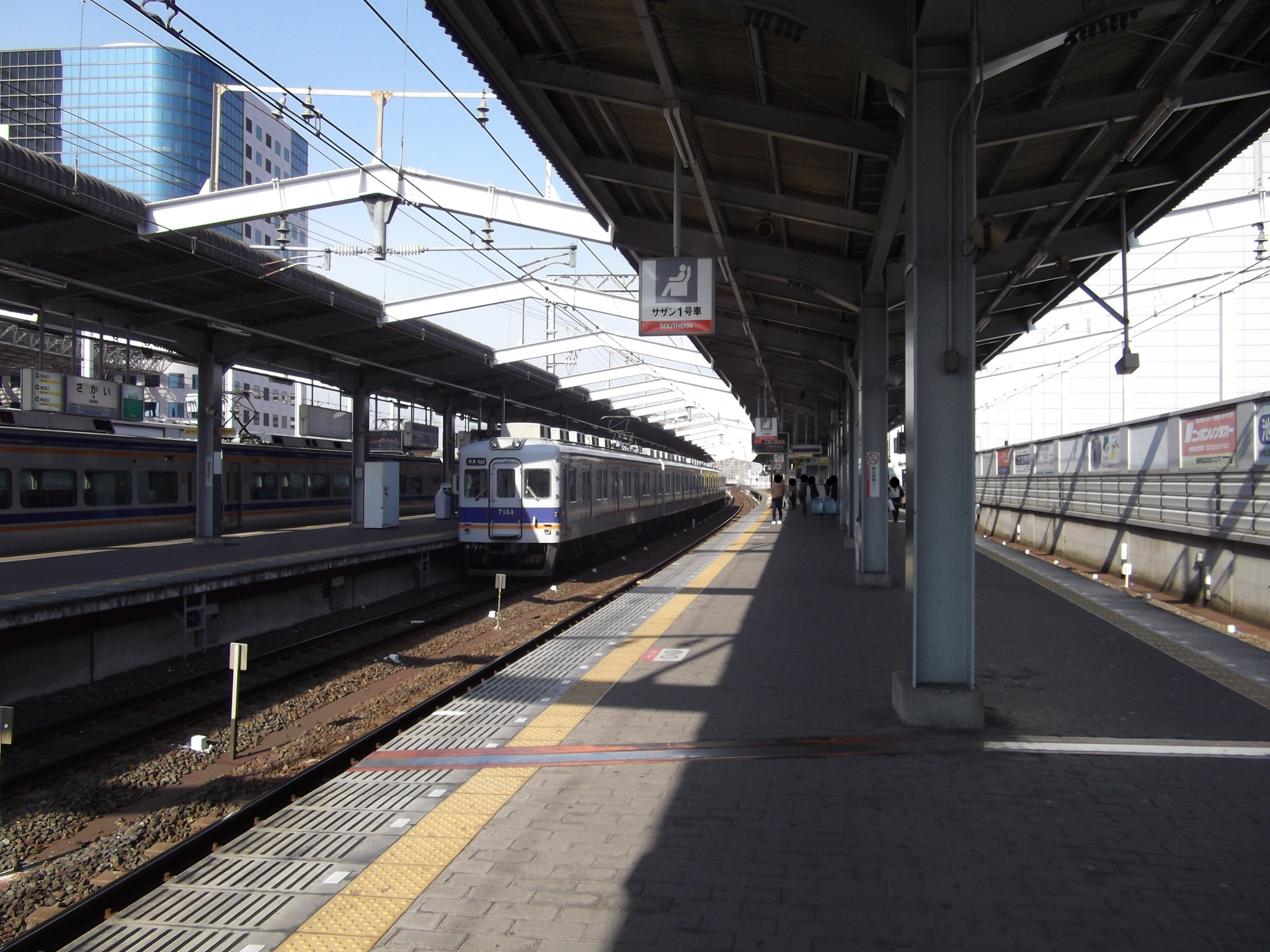
Platform

== Surrounding area ==
East
Station building
PLATPLAT (shopping mall by Nankai Railway)
Nankai Bus Terminal (Sakai-ekimae)
West
Hotel Agora Regency Sakai
Portas Sakai
Round 1 (entertainment facility)
Takemoto Piano
Bus Terminal (Sakai-eki nishiguchi)
South
Shop Nankai
Nankai Bus Terminal (Sakai-eki minamiguchi)
Ryujin District

== Buses ==
Sakai-ekimae (Nankai Bus)
for Oshoji and Sakaihigashi-ekimae
for Hanwa Sakaishi-ekimae and Kawachi-Matsubara-ekimae
for Shukuin and Higashi-Minato
for Dejima and Sakai City Hospital
for Dejima and Kogyo-gakkko-mae (Osaka Prefectural Sakai Technology High School)
for Intex Osaka, Asia & Pacific Trade Center and Osaka Prefectural Government Sakishima Building
Expressway buses for Shinjuku and Tokyo
Expressway buses for Takeo Onsen, Sasebo and Huis Ten Bosch
Expressway buses for Odawara, Fujisawa, Kamakura, Ofuna and Totsuka
Expressway buses for Kashiwazaki, Nagaoka and Sanjo
Expressway buses for Yokohama, Tokyo Disney Resort, Nishi-Funabashi and Makuhari
Sakai-eki nishiguchi
for J-GREEN Sakai (Nankai Bus)
for Sakaihama Seaside Stage (Nankai Bus)
for Takumicho (Sharp Sakai Factory) (Nankai Bus)
for Hanwa Sakaishi-ekimae (Nankai Bus)
Kansai Airport limousine "Sorae" for Kansai Airport (Nankai Bus)
for Suminoekoen (Osaka Municipal Transportation Bureau)
Sakai-eki minamiguchi (Nankai Bus)
for Kanaoka
for Nakamozu
for Kitanoda
for Shukuin and Oshoji
for Dejima and Sakai City Hospital
for Dejima and Kogyo-gakkko-mae (Osaka Prefectural Sakai Technology High School)

== History ==
Sakai Station opened on 15 May 1888. At the time, it was also called Azumabashi Station (吾妻橋駅). On 20 December 1912 Ryujin Station (龍神駅) opened between Sakai and Minato stations. The station burned down on 10 July 1945 during American air raids on Sakai in World War II. On 21 April 1955 Sakai Station and Ryujin Station were combined, with the new Sakai Station located on the site of the former Ryujin Station. The tracks were elevated between 1983 and 1985 and the new station building was completed in 1997.

== Passenger statistics ==
In fiscal 2019, the station was used by an average of 38,758 passengers daily.

== See also ==
- List of railway stations in Japan
