= Ōsakasayamashi Station =

Railway station in Ōsakasayama, Osaka Prefecture, Japan

Ōsakasayamashi Station 大阪狭山市駅
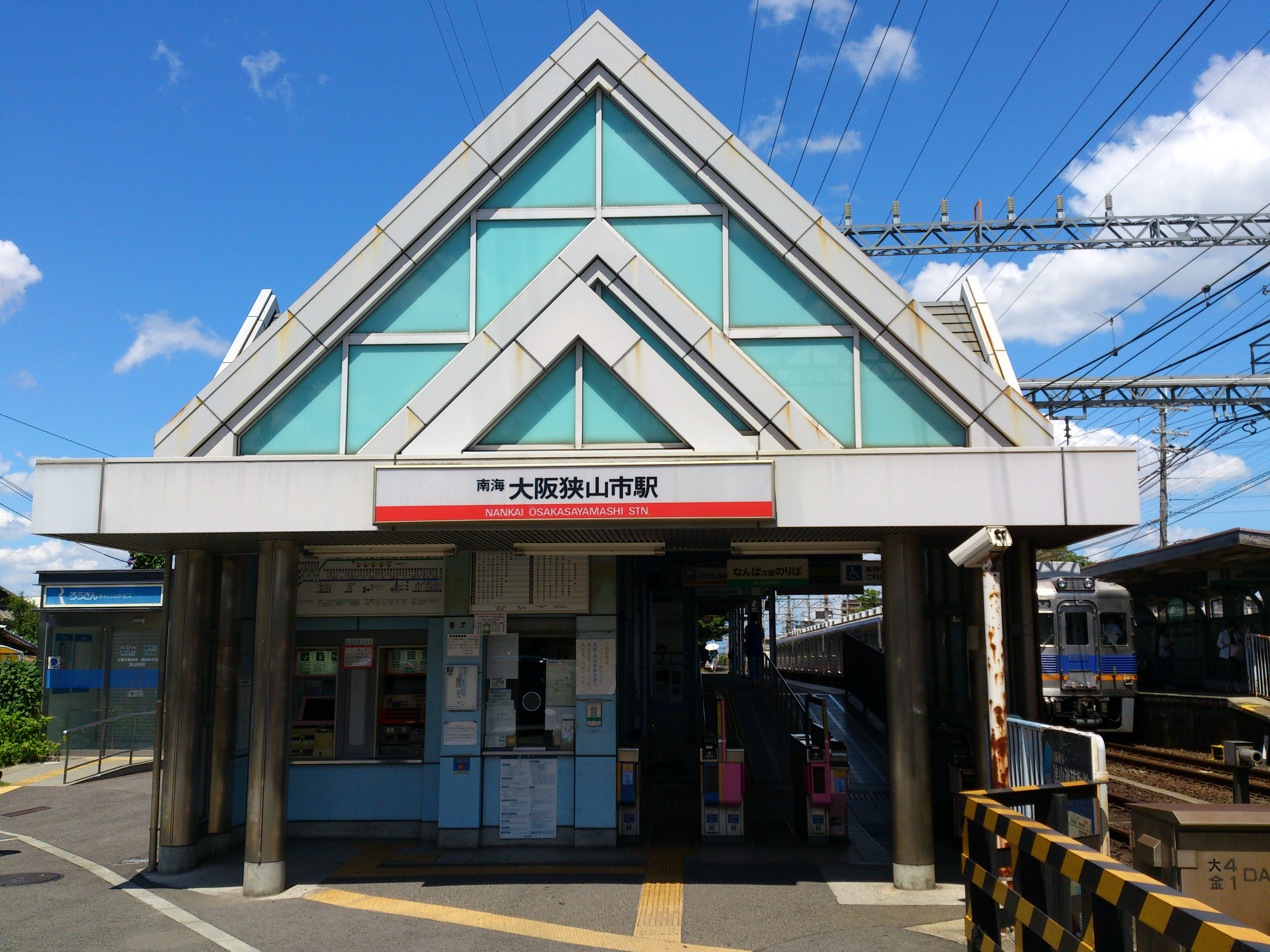
- Station building for Namba

General information
- Location: 2340-1, Sayama 4-chome, Ōsakasayama-shi Osaka-fu 589-0005; Japan
- Coordinates: 34°30′15″N 135°33′27″E
- Operator: Nankai Electric Railway
- Line: Koya Line
- Distance: 19.1 km from Shiomibashi
- Platforms: 2 side platforms
- Connections

Other information
- Station code: NK65
- Website: Official website

History
- Opened: July 5, 1917
- Former names: Kawachi-Handa; Sayamayūenmae (until 2000)

Passengers
- 2019: 9,494 daily
Location
- Location within Osaka Prefecture Location within Japan

Ōsakasayamashi Station (大阪狭山市駅, Ōsakasayamashi-eki) is a passenger railway station located in the city of Ōsakasayama, Osaka Prefecture, Japan, operated by the private railway operator Nankai Electric Railway. It has the station number "NK65".

== Lines ==
Ōsakasayamashi Station is served by the Nankai Koya Line, and is 21.8 kilometers from the terminus of the line at Shiomibashi and 21.2 kilometers from Nanba.

== Layout ==
The station consists of two ground-level opposed side platforms. The platforms are not connected, and passengers wishing to change platforms must exit the station and re-enter.

=== Platforms ===
1	■ Koya Line (southbound)	for Kōyasan
2	■ Koya Line (northbound)	for Namba

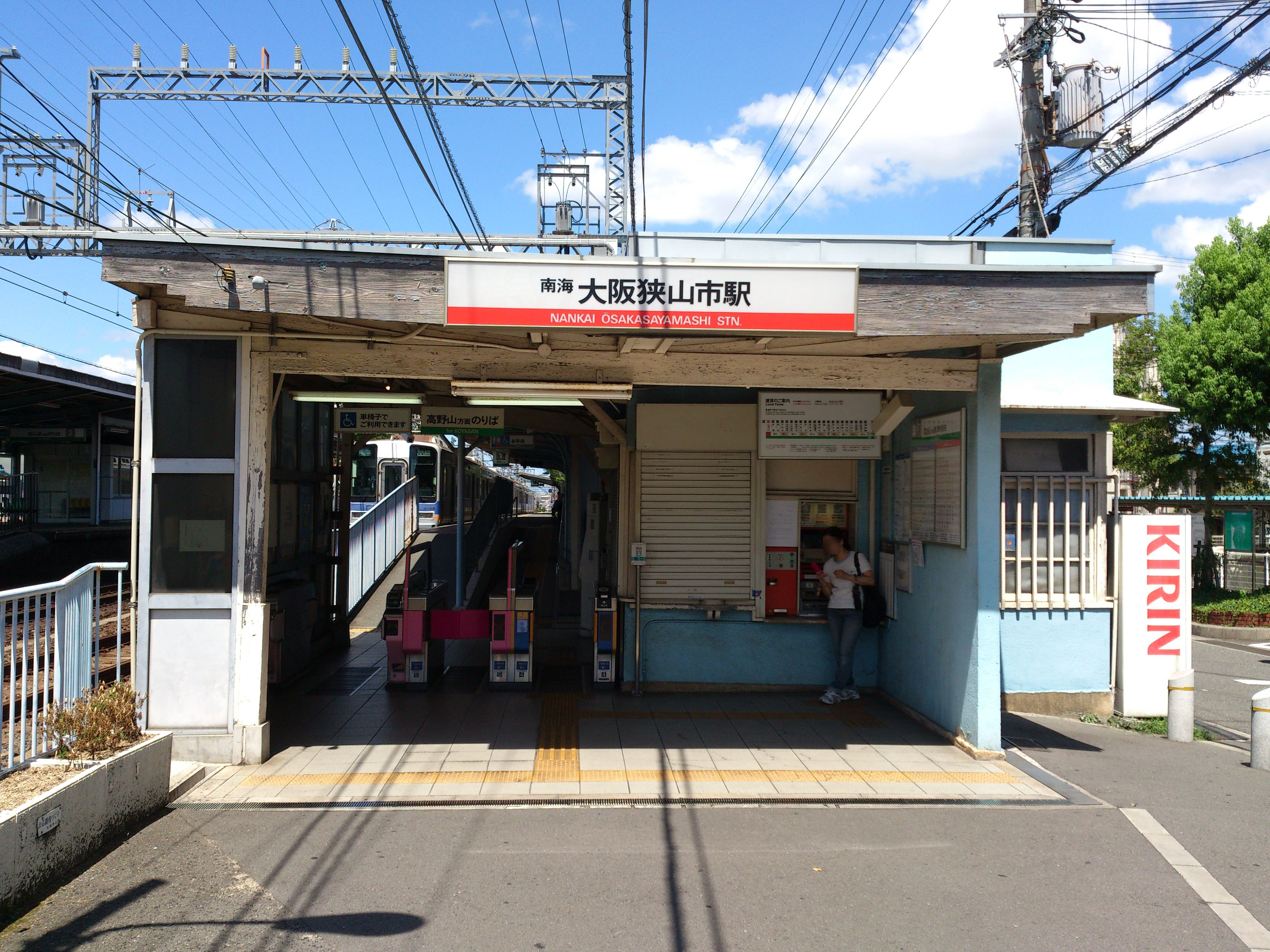
Station building for Kōyasan

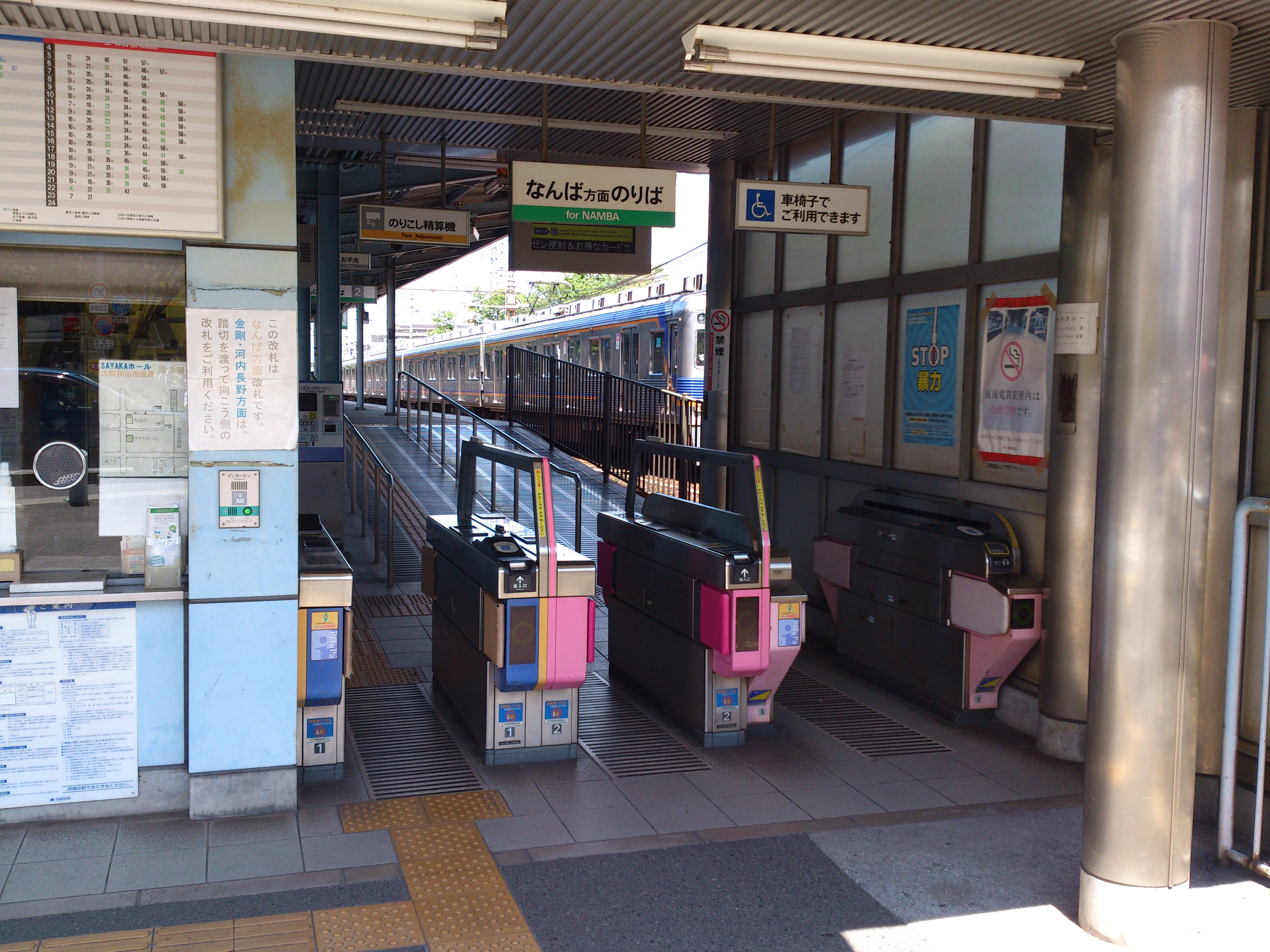
Ticket gates for Namba

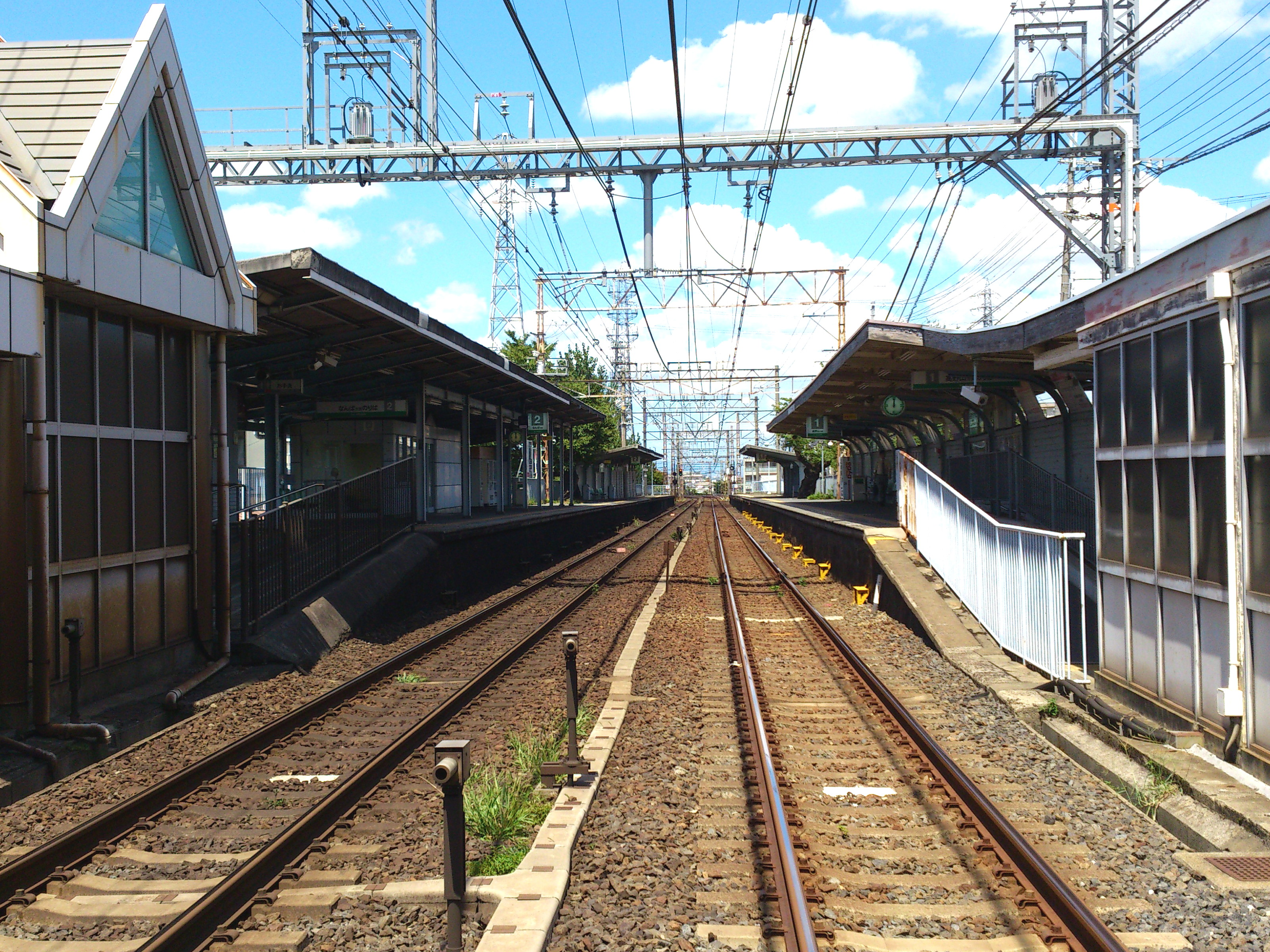
Platform

== Adjacent stations ==
«	Service	»
Nankai Electric Railway Koya Line
Limited Express "Koya", "Rinkan": Does not stop at this station
Rapid Express: Does not stop at this station
Express: Does not stop at this station
Sayama	Sub Express	Kongō
Sayama	Semi-Express for Namba	Kongō
Sayama	Local	Kongō

== History ==
Ōsakasayamashi Station opened on July 5, 1917 as Kawachi-Handa Station (河内半田駅)}. It was renamed Sayamayūenmae Station (狭山遊園前駅)} on April 1, 1950 and to its present name on December 23, 2000.

== Passenger statistics ==
In fiscal 2019, the station was used by an average of 9,494 passengers daily.

== Surrounding area ==
- Ōsakasayama City Hall
- Sayama Jin'ya Ruins
- Sayama pond

== See also ==
- List of railway stations in Japan
