= Ōsakasayama =

Ōsakasayama 大阪狭山市
- City
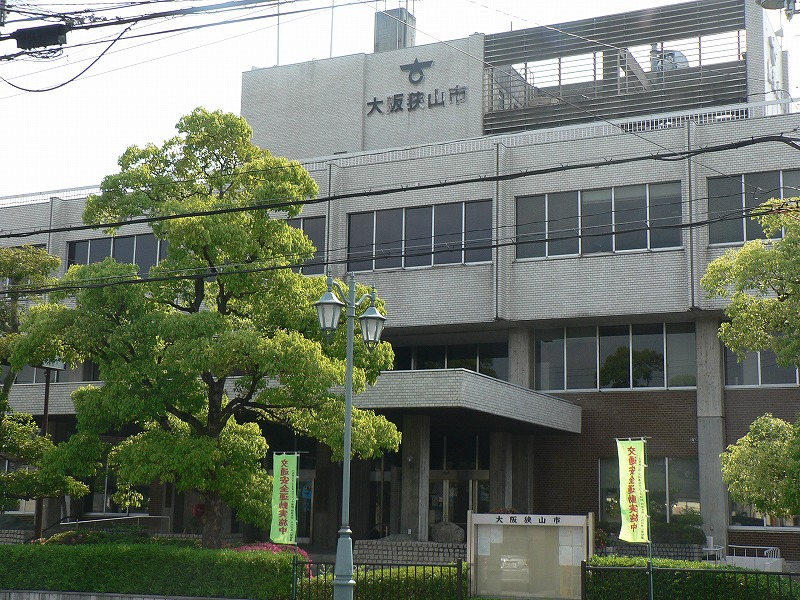
- Ōsakasayama City Hall

- Flag Seal

- Location of Ōsakasayama in Osaka Prefecture

- Location in Japan
- Coordinates: 34°30′N 135°33′E
- Country: Japan
- Region: Kansai
- Prefecture: Osaka

Government
  - Mayor: Tomoyoshi Yoshida (since April 2003)

Area
  - Total: 11.92 km^{2} (4.60 sq mi)

Population (January 31, 2022)
  - Total: 58,465
  - Density: 4,905/km^{2} (12,700/sq mi)
- Time zone: UTC+09:00 (JST)
- City hall address: 1-2384-1 Sayama, Sayama-shi, Osaka-fu 589-8501
- Website: Official website
- Symbols
- Flower: Azalea
- Tree: Cherry blossom

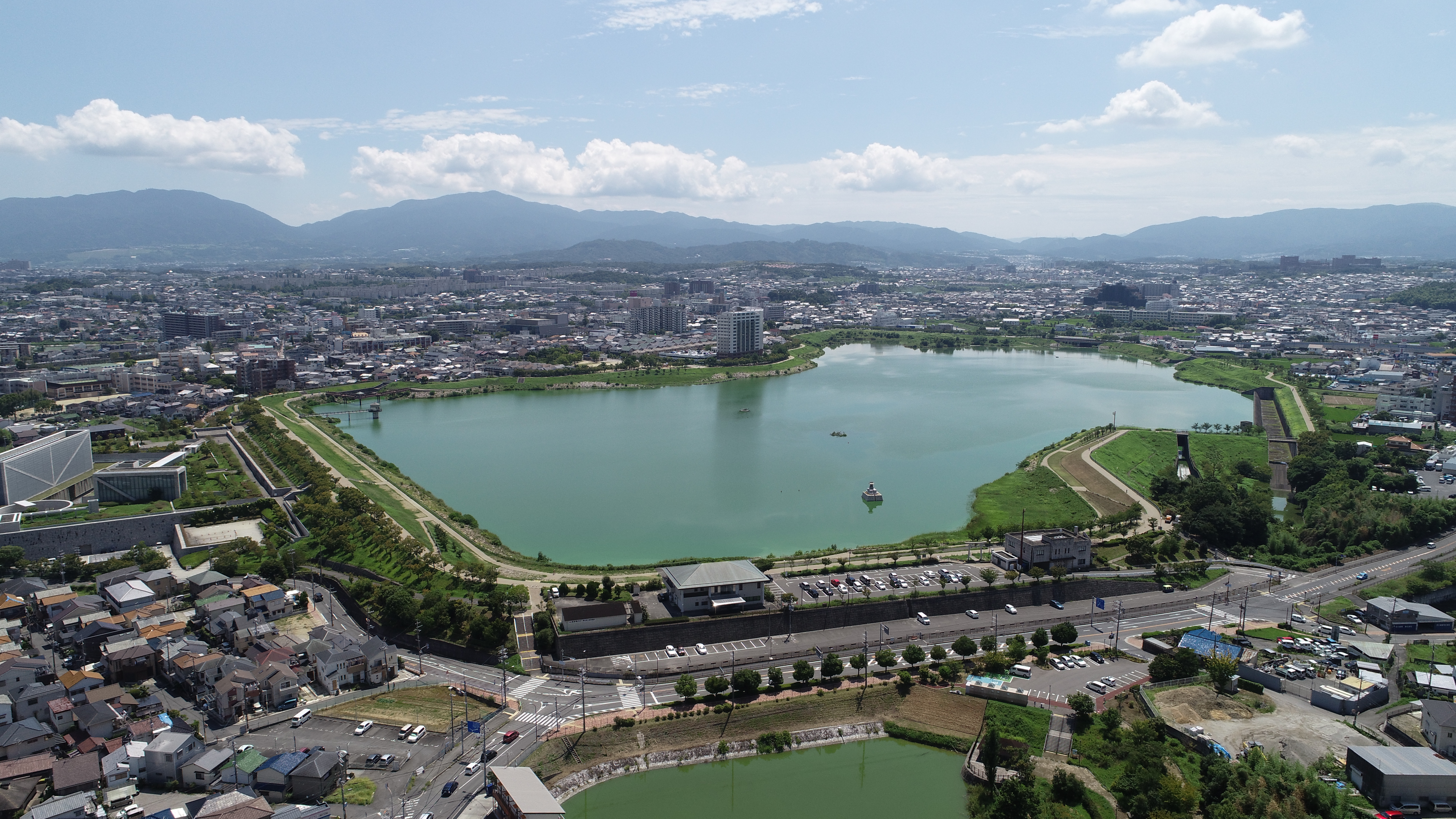
Sayama Pond

Ōsakasayama (大阪狭山市, Ōsakasayama-shi; Japanese pronunciation: [ò̞ó̞.sä́.kä́.sä́.jä̀.mä̀, -jä́.mä́.ɕì, ó̞ó̞-]) is a city in Osaka Prefecture, Japan. As of 31 January 2022, the city had an estimated population of 58,465 in 26128 households and a population density of 4900 persons per km^{2}. The total area of the city is 11.92 square kilometres (4.60 sq mi).

== Geography ==
Ōsakasayama is located in the southeastern part of Osaka Prefecture. Sayama pond, which is said to be the oldest dam-type reservoir in Japan, is located in the center of the city and is a symbol of the city.

=== Neighboring municipalities ===
Osaka Prefecture

- Kawachinagano
- Sakai
- Tondabayashi

== Climate ==
Ōsakasayama has a humid subtropical climate (Köppen Cfa) characterized by warm summers and cool winters with light to no snowfall. The average annual temperature in Ōsakasayama is 14.6 °C. The average annual rainfall is 1475 mm with September as the wettest month. The temperatures are highest on average in August, at around 26.6 °C, and lowest in January, at around 3.2 °C.

== Demographics ==
Per Japanese census data, the population of Ōsakasayama has increased form the 1960s through 1990s and has now leveled off.

Historical population
Year	Pop.	±%
1920	5,160	—
1930	5,732	+11.1%
1940	6,361	+11.0%
1950	9,114	+43.3%
1960	9,648	+5.9%
1970	19,198	+99.0%
1980	46,508	+142.3%
1990	54,319	+16.8%
2000	56,996	+4.9%
2010	58,238	+2.2%

== History ==
The area of the modern city of Ōsakasayama was within ancient Kawachi Province. From 1600 to the Meiji restoration it was the seat of the Later Hōjō clan, rulers of Sayama Domain under the Tokugawa shogunate. The area became part of Osaka Prefecture from 1881. The villages of Sayama was created with the establishment of the modern municipalities system on April 1, 1889. On April 1, 1896 the area became part of Minamikawachi District, Osaka. Sayama was elevated to town status on April 1, 1951. On October 1, 1987, Sayama was raised to city status. To avoid confusion with the city of Sayama in Saitama Prefecture, the name was changed to Ōsakasayama.

== Government ==
Ōsakasayama has a mayor-council form of government with a directly elected mayor and a unicameral city council of 15 members. Ōsakasayama, collectively with Tondabayashi and the smaller municipalities of Minamikawachi District contributes two members to the Osaka Prefectural Assembly. In terms of national politics, the city is part of Osaka 15th district of the lower house of the Diet of Japan.

== Economy ==
Due to its location next to the large metropolis of Osaka City and Sakai, Sayama has developed into a commuter town with large New Town developments from the 1970s through 1990s, inlacing the large-scale Sayama New Town, in the southern part of the city. Traditionally, the area was known for growing grapes.

== Education ==
Ōsakasayama has seven public elementary schools and three public middle schools operated by the city government and one public high school operated by the Osaka Prefectural Department of Education. The medical school of Kindai University is located in Ōsakasayama.

== Transportation ==
=== Railway ===
Nankai Electric Railway - Nankai Kōya Line

- Sayama - Ōsakasayamashi - Kongō

=== Highway ===
- National Route 310

== Sister cities ==
- Ontario, Oregon, United States

== Local attractions ==
- Sayama pond, National Historic Site
  - Osaka Prefectural Sayamaike Museum - The museum was designed by Tadao Ando

== Notable people from Ōsakasayama ==
- Rikka Ihara, Japanese actress and singer
- Teppei Koike, Japanese actor, singer and member of the singer-songwriter duo WaT
- Yuki Kotani, Japanese football player (Roasso Kumamoto, J3 League/Cerezo Osaka, J1 League)
- Yuki Muroya, Japanese women's professional shogi player ranked 3-dan
- Shigeyuki Nakarai, Japanese breakdancer
- Tomoka Nishiyama, Japanese apprentice shogi professional player ranked 3-dan
- Aki Takayama, Japanese former synchronised swimming athlete
- Tatsuhiro Tamura, Japanese professional baseball catcher (Chiba Lotte Marines, Nippon Professional Baseball – Pacific League)
- Kenkichi Ueda, general in the Imperial Japanese Army
- Kan Usuki, Japanese idol, comedian, musician, Pin Artist and drummer
