= Hōjō Ujiyuki =

Japanese daimyō

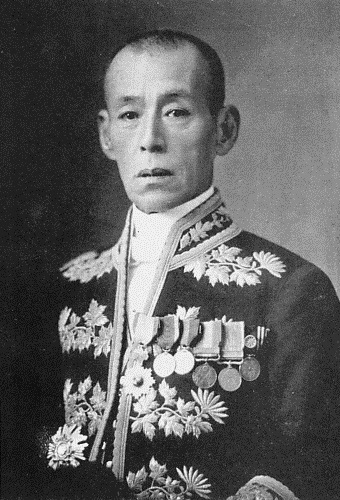

Daimyō of Sayama
- In office 1861–1869
- Preceded by: Hōjō Ujiyoshi

Personal details
- Born: Edo, Japan

Hōjō Ujiyuki (北条 氏恭; September 19, 1845 – October 16, 1919) was a Japanese daimyō of the late Edo period who ruled the Sayama Domain of Kawachi Province. He succeeded to the family headship in 1861. Though Ujiyuki was named domainal governor (藩知事 han chiji) by the Meiji government, he willingly resigned this position in 1869.
