= Yuki Kotani =

Japanese footballer

Yuki Kotani 小谷 祐喜
Personal information
- Full name: Yuki Kotani
- Date of birth: July 27, 1991 (age 35)
- Place of birth: Ōsakasayama, Japan
- Height: 1.80 m (5 ft 11 in)
- Position: Defender

Youth career
- –2003: White Bears FC
- 2004–2006: Cerezo Osaka
- 2007–2009: Kansai Univ. Daiichi High School

College career
Years	Team	Apps	(Gls)
2010–2013	Kansai University		

Senior career*
Years	Team	Apps	(Gls)
2014–2016	Cerezo Osaka	0	(0)
2015	→ SC Sagamihara (loan)	22	(1)
2016	→ Cerezo Osaka U-23 (loan)	17	(1)
2016	→ Roasso Kumamoto (loan)	10	(0)
2017–2020	Roasso Kumamoto	70	(4)
2023-2024	Nara Club	31	(1)
Total		150	(7)
- * Club domestic league appearances and goals

Yuki Kotani (小谷 祐喜, Kotani Yūki; born July 27, 1991 in Osaka) is a former Japanese football player.

== Club statistics ==
Updated to 23 February 2018.

Club performance			League		Cup		League Cup		Continental		Total	
Season	Club	League	Apps	Goals	Apps	Goals	Apps	Goals	Apps	Goals	Apps	Goals
Japan			League		Emperor's Cup		J.League Cup		AFC		Total	
2014	Cerezo Osaka	J1 League	0	0	1	0	2	0	1	0	4	0
2015	SC Sagamihara	J3 League	22	1	0	0	–		–		22	1
2016	Cerezo Osaka U-23	J3 League	17	1	–		–		–		17	1
2016	Roasso Kumamoto	J2 League	10	0	1	0	–		–		11	0
2017	Roasso Kumamoto	J2 League	23	2	1	0	–		–		24	2
Career total			72	4	3	0	2	0	1	0	83	4
