= Minato Station =

Railway station in Sakai, Japan

Minato Station 湊駅
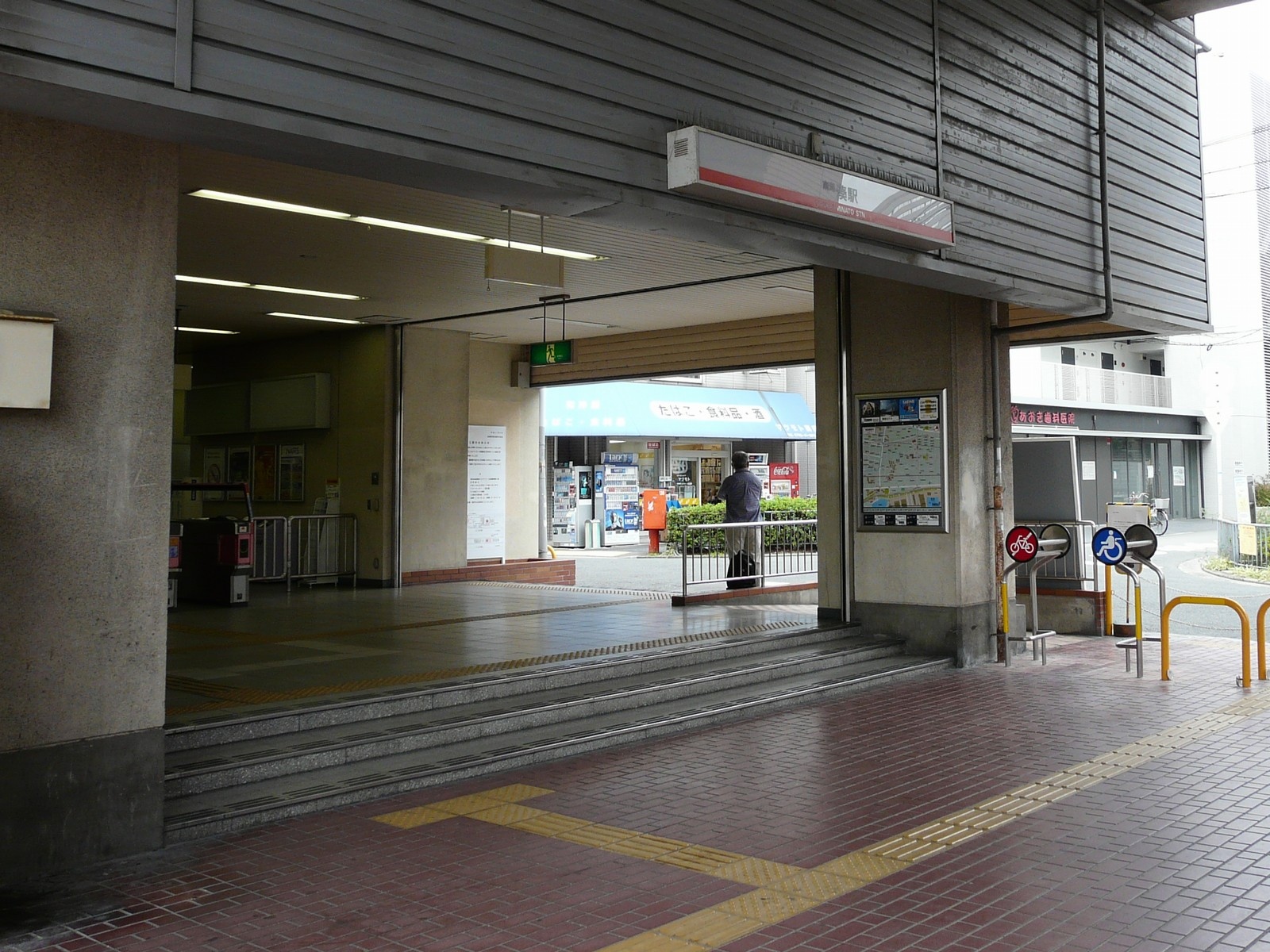
- Minato Station entrance in July 2008

General information
- Location: 4-9, Dejima-cho 2-cho, Sakai-ku, Sakai-shi, Osaka-fu 590-0834; Japan
- Coordinates: 34°34′14″N 135°27′36″E
- Operator: Nankai Electric Railway
- Line: Nankai Main Line
- Distance: 11.2 km from Namba
- Platforms: 1 island platform

Other information
- Station code: NK12
- Website: Official website

History
- Opened: 1 October 1897; 128 years ago

Passengers
- 2019: 6704 daily

Services
Preceding station	Nankai Electric Railway	Following station
Sakai towards Namba	Nankai Main Line Local	Ishizugawa towards Wakayamashi
Sakai towards Namba	Nankai Main Line Semi-Express	Ishizugawa One-way operation
Location
- Location within Osaka Prefecture Location within Japan

Minato Station (湊駅, Minato-eki) is a passenger railway station located in Sakai-ku, Sakai, Osaka Prefecture, Japan, operated by the private railway operator Nankai Electric Railway.It has the station number "NK12".

== Lines ==
Minato Station is served by the Nankai Main Line, and is 11.2 kilometers (7.0 mi) from the terminus of the line at Nanba.

== Layout ==
The station consists of one elevated island platform with the station building underneath.

=== Platforms ===
1	■ Nankai Main Line	for Wakayamashi and Kansai Airport
2	■ Nankai Main Line	for Namba

== History ==
Minato Station opened on 1 October 1897.

== Passenger statistics ==
In fiscal 2019, the station was used by an average of 6704 passengers daily.

== Surrounding area ==
- Sakai Dejima Fishing Port
- Sakai Dejima Yacht Harbor
- Sakai City Ohama Junior High School

== See also ==
- List of railway stations in Japan
