= Kongō Station =

Railway station in Ōsakasayama, Osaka Prefecture, Japan

Kongō Station 金剛駅
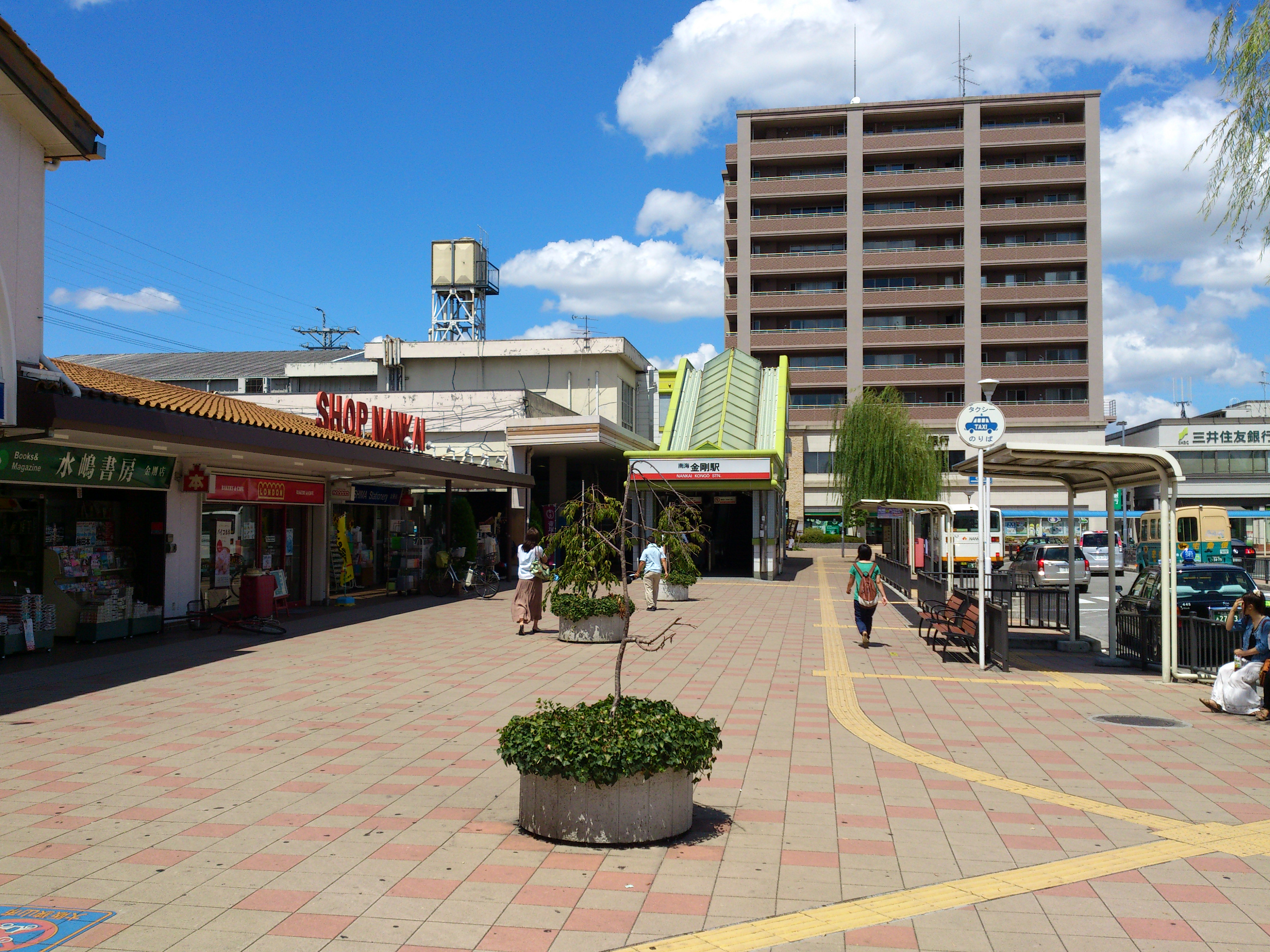
- Kongō Station, East exit

General information
- Location: 1-1-1, Kongō, Ōsakasayama-shi, Osaka-fu 589-0006; Japan
- Coordinates: 34°29′42.8″N 135°33′34″E
- Operator: Nankai Electric Railway
- Line: Kōya Line
- Connections: Bus terminal

Other information
- Station code: NK66
- Website: Official website

History
- Opened: April 19, 1937

Passengers
- 2019: 32,893 daily
Location
- Location within Osaka Prefecture Location within Japan

Kongō Station (金剛駅, Kongō-eki) is a passenger railway station located in the city of Ōsakasayama, Osaka Prefecture, Japan, operated by the private railway operator Nankai Electric Railway. It has the station number "NK66".

== Lines ==
Kongō Station is served by the Nankai Koya Line, and is 22.9 kilometers from the terminus of the line at Shiomibashi and 22.2 kilometers from Nanba.

== Layout ==
The station consists of two ground-level island platforms connected by an elevated station building.

=== Platforms ===
| 1 | ■ Koya Line | for Kōyasan returning for Namba |
| 2 | ■ Koya Line | for Kōyasan |
| 3 | ■ Koya Line | for Namba |
| 4 | ■ Koya Line | for Namba |

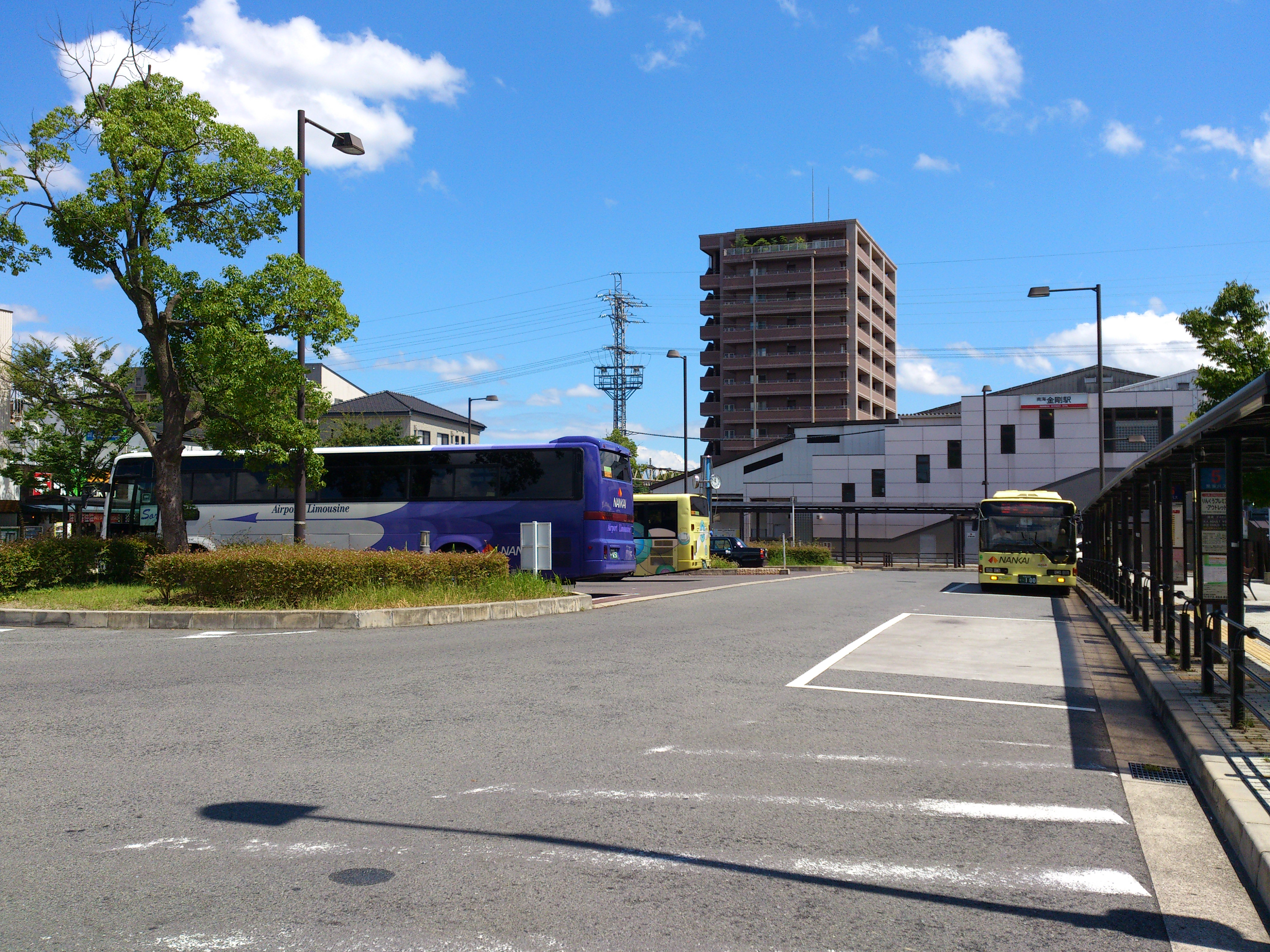
West exit

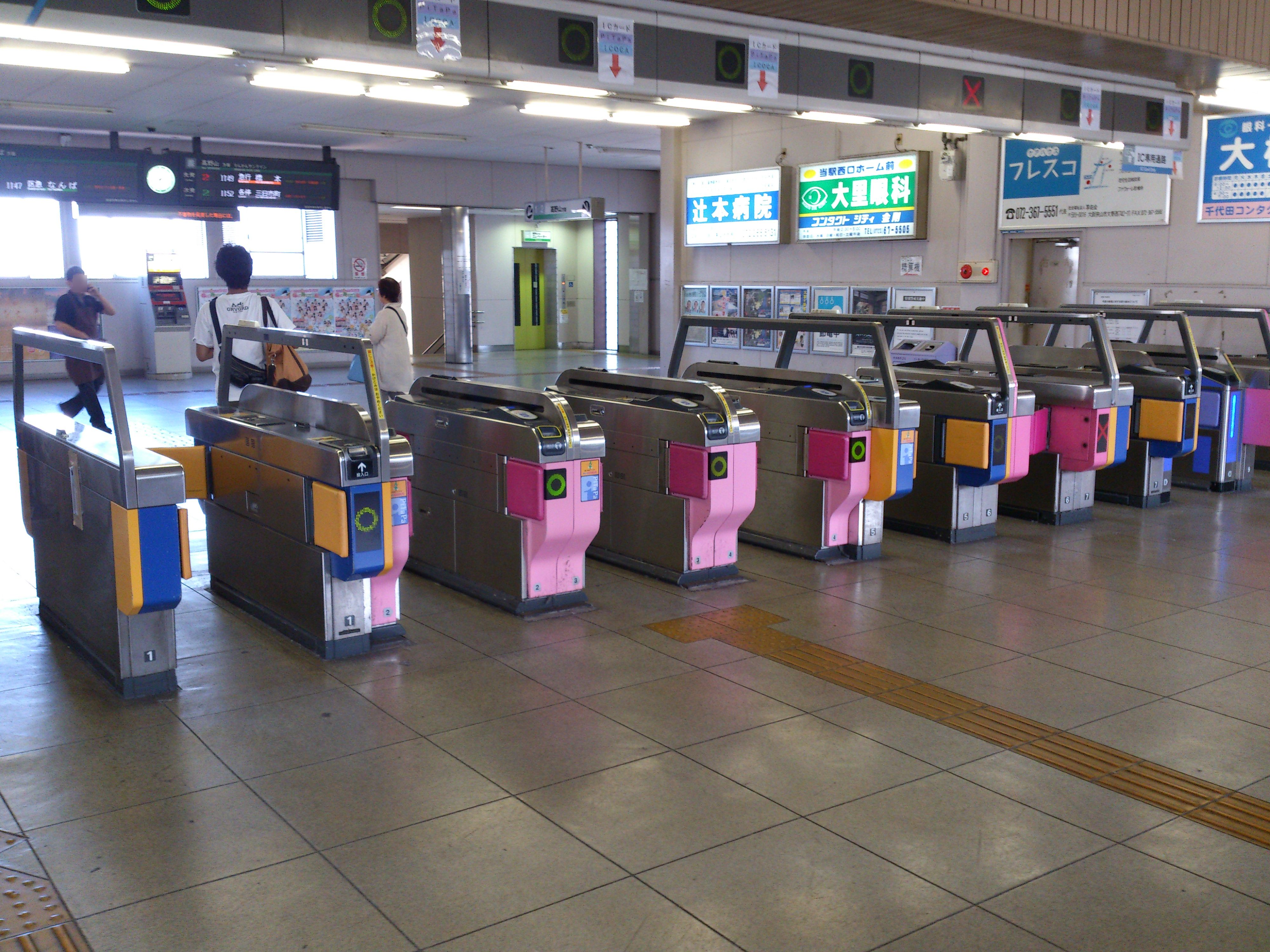
Ticket gates

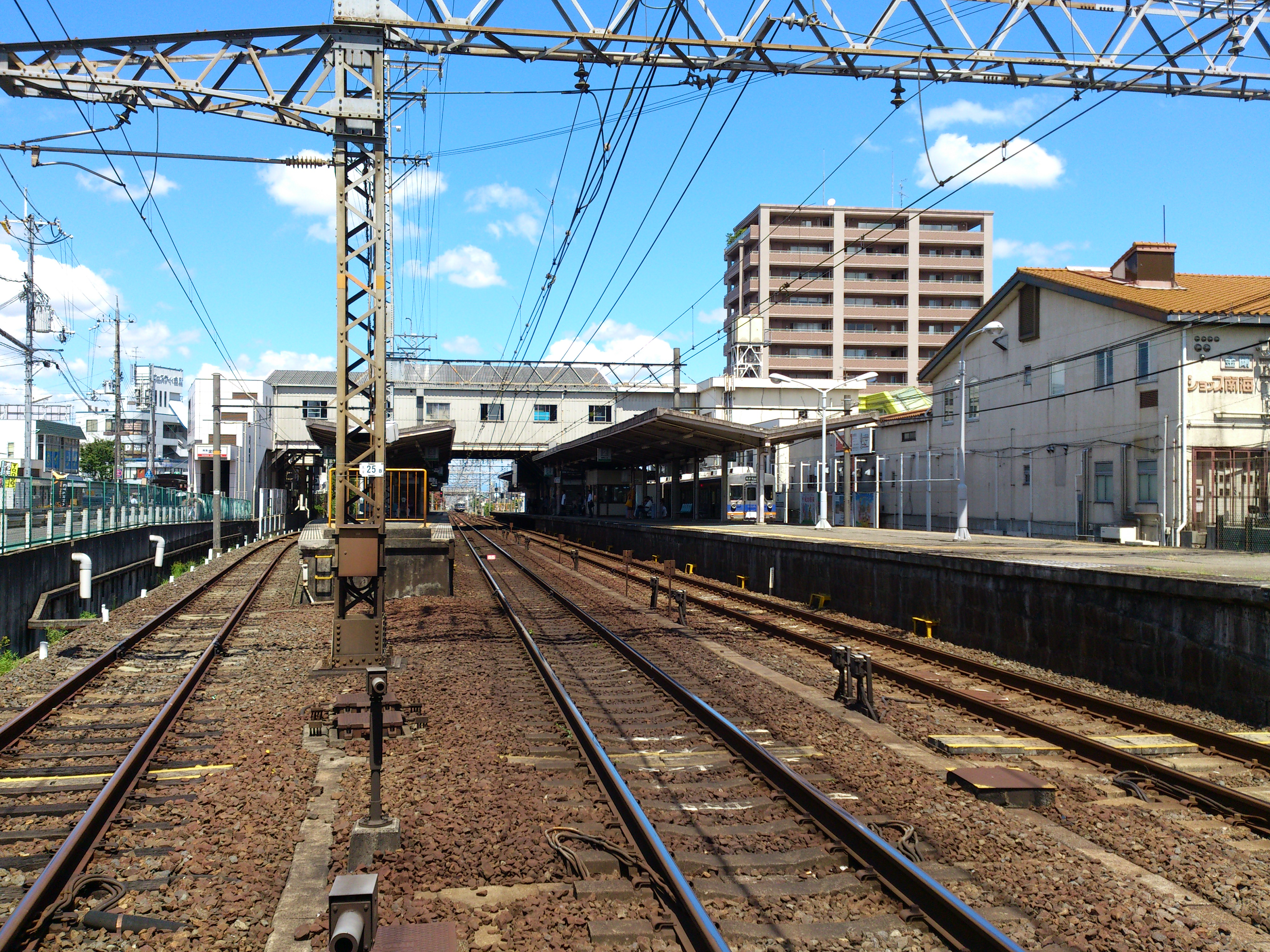
Platform

== Adjacent stations ==
| « | Service | » |
Nankai Electric Railway Koya Line (NK66)
| Ōsakasayamashi (NK65) | Local | Takidani (NK67) |
| Ōsakasayamashi (NK65) | Semi-Express (only running for Namba) | Takidani (NK67) |
| Ōsakasayamashi (NK65) | Sub Express | Takidani (NK67) |
| Kitanoda (NK63) | Express | Kawachinagano (NK69) |
| Kitanoda (NK63) | Rapid Express | Kawachinagano (NK69) |
| Sakaihigashi (NK56) | Limited Express "Koya", "Rinkan" | Kawachinagano (NK69) |

== History ==
Kongō Station opened on April 19, 1937.

== Passenger statistics ==
In fiscal 2019, the station was used by an average of 32,893 passengers daily.

== Surrounding area ==
- Kongō New Town
- Aeon Kongo store
- Osaka Prefectural Sayama High School

== See also ==
- List of railway stations in Japan
