= Kan Usuki =

Japanese musician (born 1991)

- 臼杵 寛
- Born: 30 March 1991 (age 35); Ōsakasayama, Osaka, Japan
- Occupations: Idol; musician
- Years active: 2010–
- Known for: Member of: Inifini (2012–); Spin Cross (2012–); L.A.F.U. (2011–14); d Button (2015–18)
- Modeling information
- Height: 174 cm (5 ft 9 in) (2013

Kan Usuki (臼杵 寛, Usuki Kan; born 30 March 1991) is an idol, musician, pin artist belonging to Yoshimoto Creative Agency. He is part of the multi-active unit Infini and is the drummer of the pop rock band Spin Cross. Previously, he was in charge of tsukkomi for a ikemen stage unit L.A.F.U. and the comedy duo d Button.

== Biography ==
Usuki's career began as a model in Osaka. In November 2010, he belonged to Tokyo's Baroque Works, where he worked as an actor. He auditioned for an ikemen stage unit produced by Yoshimoto Kogyo, and became a member of Yoshimoto Creative Agency on 12 February 2011 when he passed the audition. On 28 February of the same year, the unit's name was announced as L.A.F.U. He ended up graduating from L.A.F.U in 2014.

In March 2012 he began working with Infini, a unit owned by Koei Tecmo. In June of that year, Usuki became the drummer for the pop rock band Spin Cross.

He formed One Hand Red with his high school classmate, Motokatsu Sannaka in 2015. The duo later they renamed themselves as San Prize because of their lucky number "3". On the 27 February 2016 broadcast of the Fuji TV variety show Mecha-Mecha Iketeru!, his partner Sannaka re-auditioned to be a regular member, and if he passed then Usuki would join him as a regular. However, Sannaka did not pass the viewer vote, so neither of them became regulars. Just after that program aired, the duo was renamed once again, this time to d Button. On 3 March 2016, d Button appeared in the outline presentation of Jinbōchō Kagetsu Shin Yunitto Kessei. At the end of January 2018, Usuki announced that the duo would dissolve due to "directional differences". In parallel with the activities from before the formation of another group in the future, he would do activities as a pin entertainer.

== Personal life ==
Teppei Koike was his senior at Osaka Sayama Municipal Third Junior High School. His former partner Motokatsu Sannaka was his classmate of Osaka Prefecture Imamiya Technical High School. When he was in high school, he played drums in a band. Usuki's special skills include playing the drums, football, human beat boxing, and mahjong.

Usuki also has certificates in Zhusuan (Grade 2) Mental calculation (Grade 3), Calculation technique (Grade 3), and Information technology (Grade 3).

== Appearances ==
=== Variety ===
- Star Hime Sagashi Tarō (Jan–Mar 2011, TX)
- Mecha-Mecha Iketeru! (27 Feb 12 March 2016, CX)

=== Films ===
- The Lady Shogun and Her Men (2010)
