= Sayama pond =

7th century pond in Osaka, Japan

Sayama Pond Dam
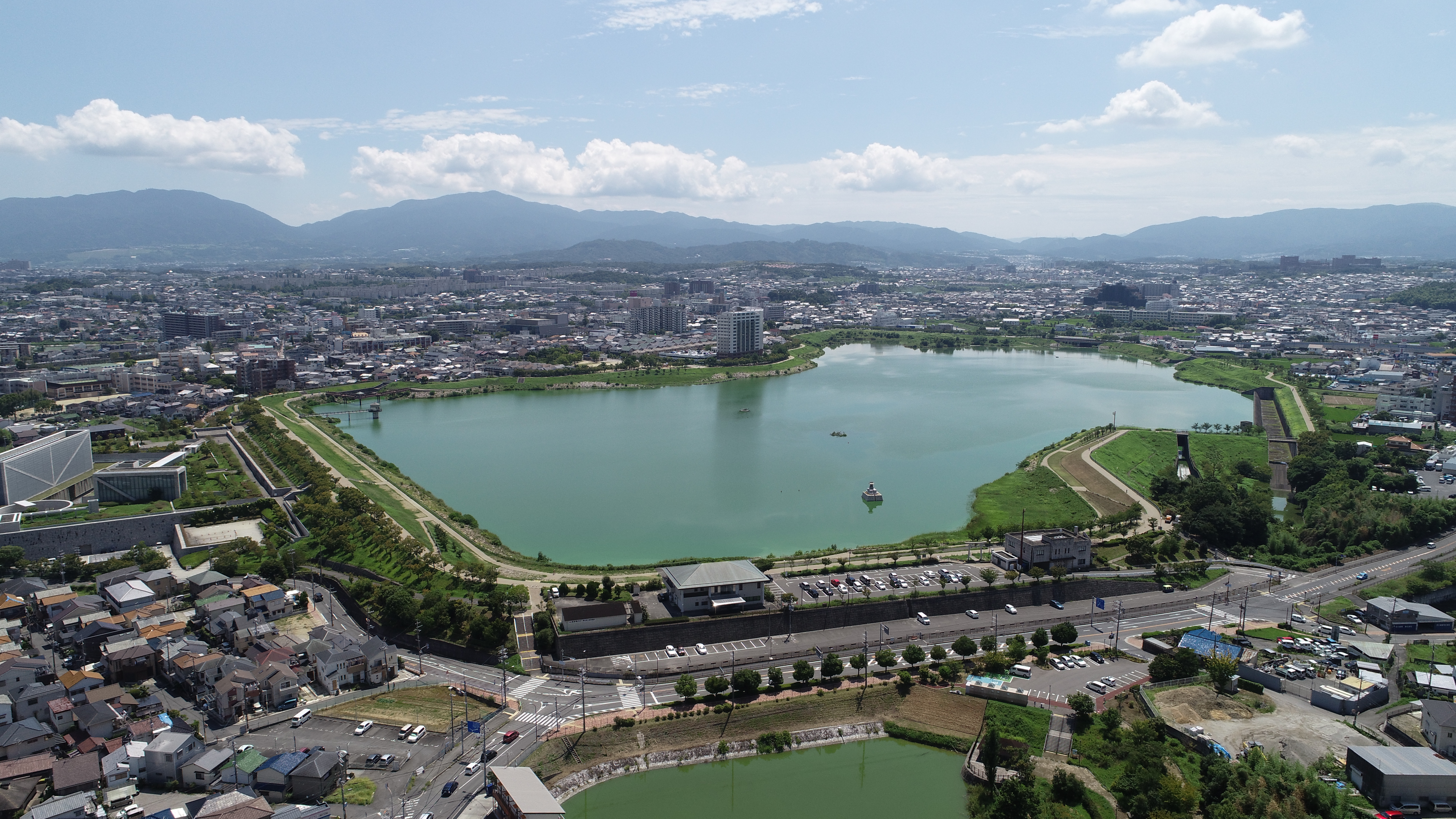
- Sayama pond

- Sayama Pond Sayama Pond Dam (Japan)
- Country: Japan
- Location: Ōsakasayama, Osaka Prefecture
- Coordinates: 34°30′9.8″N 135°33′0.3″E
- Purpose: irrigation, flood control
- Opening date: c. Asuka period

Dam and spillways
- Type of dam: Earthen
- Impounds: Nishiyoke River
- Height (foundation): 18.5 meters
- Length: 997 m (3,271 ft)
- Dam volume: 605,000 m³

Reservoir
- Creates: Sayama Pond
- Total capacity: 2,800,000 m³
- Surface area: 17.9 km²
- National Historic Site of Japan

Sayama pond (狭山池, Sayama-ike) is an artificial reservoir located in the city of Ōsakasayama, Osaka Prefecture in the Kansai region of Japan. Constructed around the 6th century, it is claimed to be the oldest in Japan, based on chronological survey of potteries near the lake which confirmed that the pond was completed in 7th century. The pond was designated a National Historic Site in 1946, and is listed as World Heritage Irrigation Structure by the International Commission of Irrigation and Drainage.

== Overview ==
The origins of the Sayama Pond are not clear; it was completed some time between the fourth and seventh centuries, during the Kofun to Asuka period. It appears in both the Kojiki and Nihon Shoki, which states that it was made during the reign of Emperor Sujin by damming the north-flowing Nishiyoke and Mitsuya rivers. It is believed to have been repaired by Gyōki in 731, and again in 762 after a collapse of the embankment. Further repairs were recorded in 1202 and in 1608. During the Edo Period, the pond was maintained by the Ikejiri family on a hereditary basis, and managed by Sayama Domain (whose jin'ya was on the eastern side of the pond), although the pond itself was direct property of the Tokugawa shogunate. Until the re-routing of the Yamato River cut off much of its water supply and drainage channels in 1704, the pond provided irrigation water for 80 villages. From 1898, the pond came undertone control of the Sayama Pond Ordinary Water Conservancy Association and water supply method and regulations were modernized. A project to add a flood control function to the pond was completed in 1998, at which time the area around the pond was made into a public park. Over 50 species of wild birds have been spotted in the pond area.

In addition, the Osaka Prefectural Sayama Pond Museum, opened in 2001 on the north side of the pond for the purpose of preserving and opening the former Sayama Pond. It contains displays of a portion of original embankment cut out during the renovation work and allows visitors to see the cross section. Dendrochronology of timbers used in the base of the embankment yielded a date of 616 AD, or during the reign of Empress Suiko, and the construction method similar to contemporary structures which have been found in China. Analysis of sediments found large quantities of marine diatoms, which confirm that tsunami from large earthquakes in the past, such as the 684 Hakuhō earthquake and the 1605 Keichō earthquake reached the pond. Also found during the archaeological excavation was the remnants of signboard for the 1202 renovation of the pond by the monk Chōgen. It was designated as an Important Cultural Property in 2014.

== Gallery ==
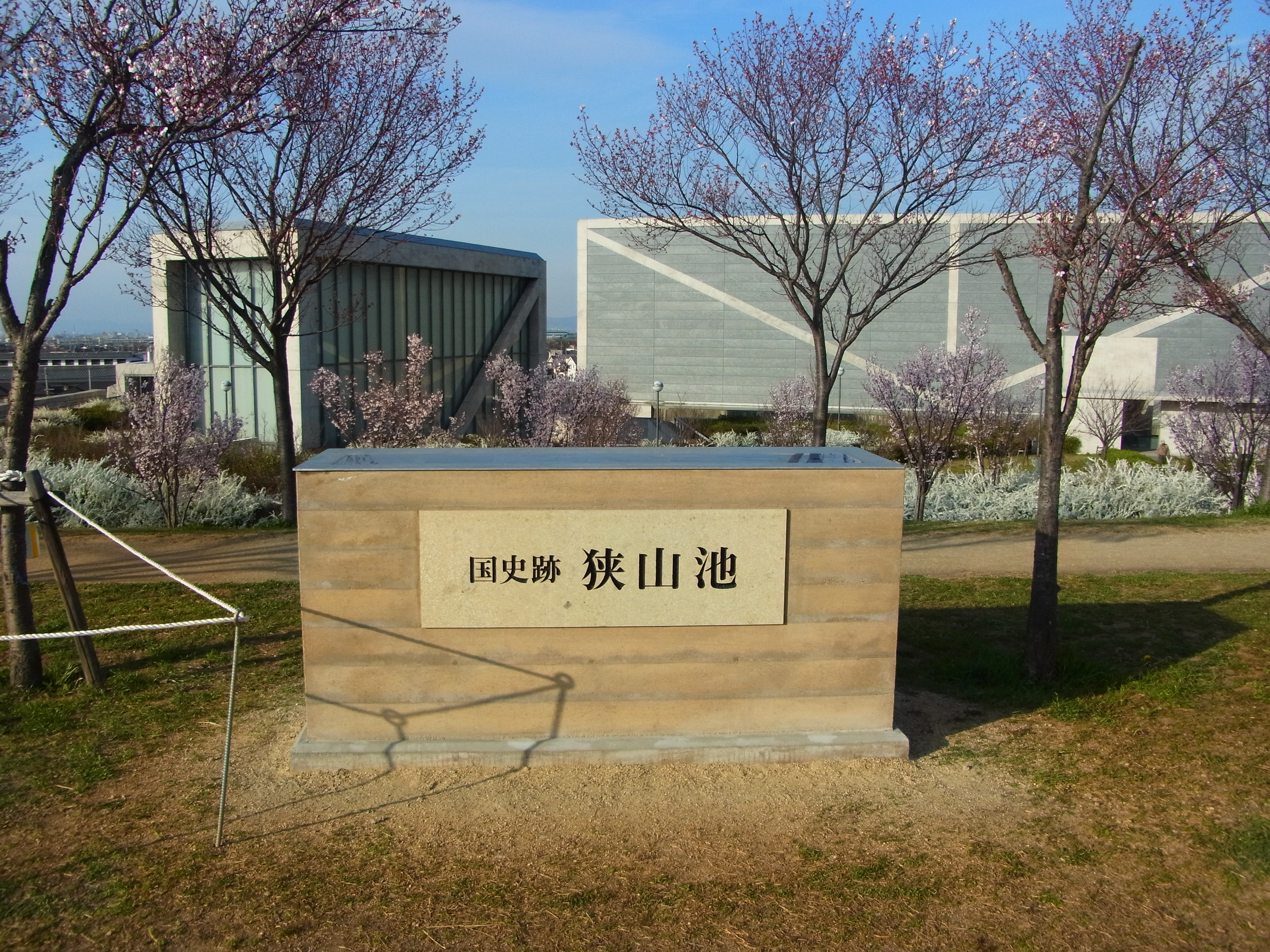
Sayama Pond

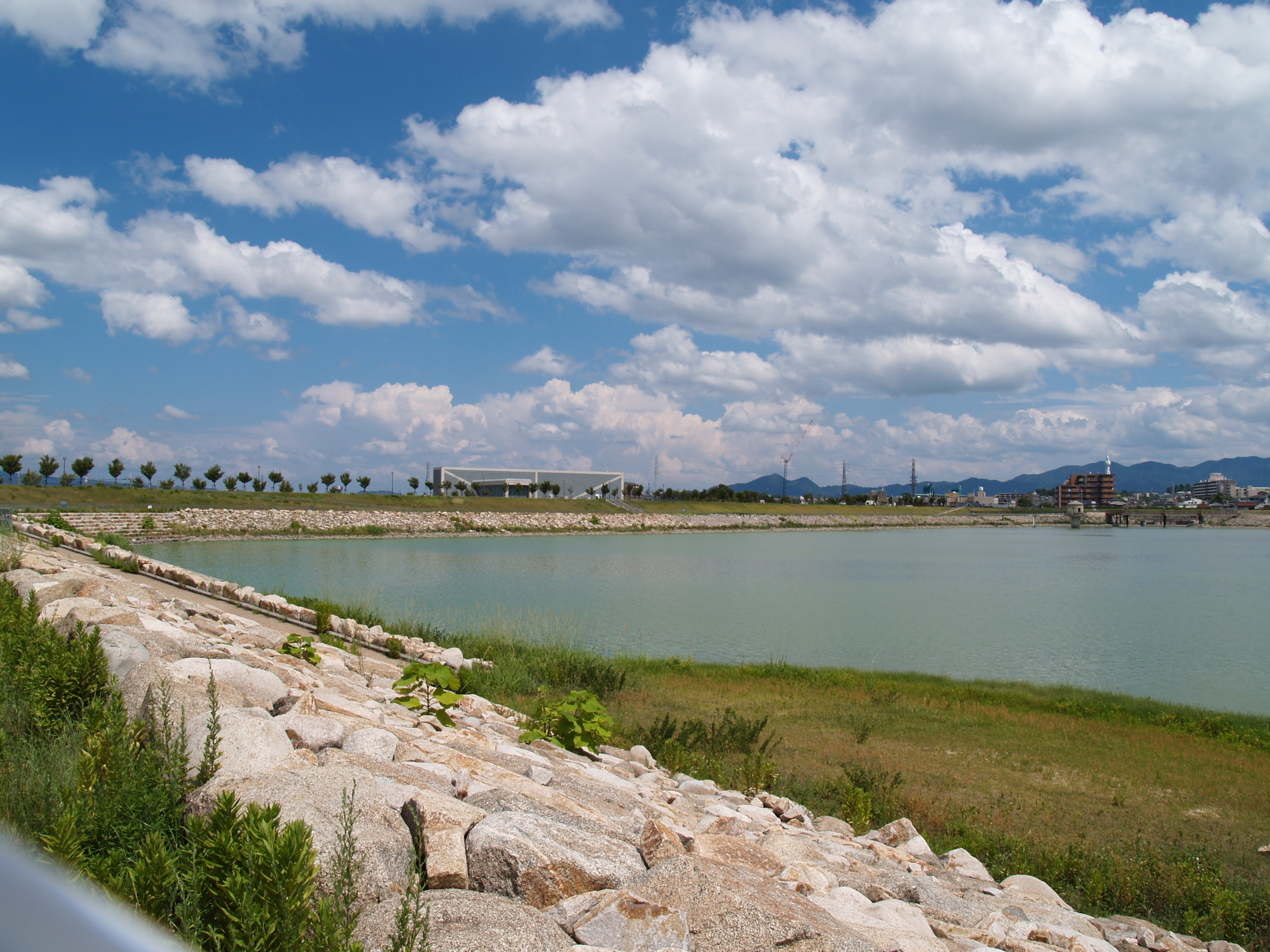
Sayama Pond

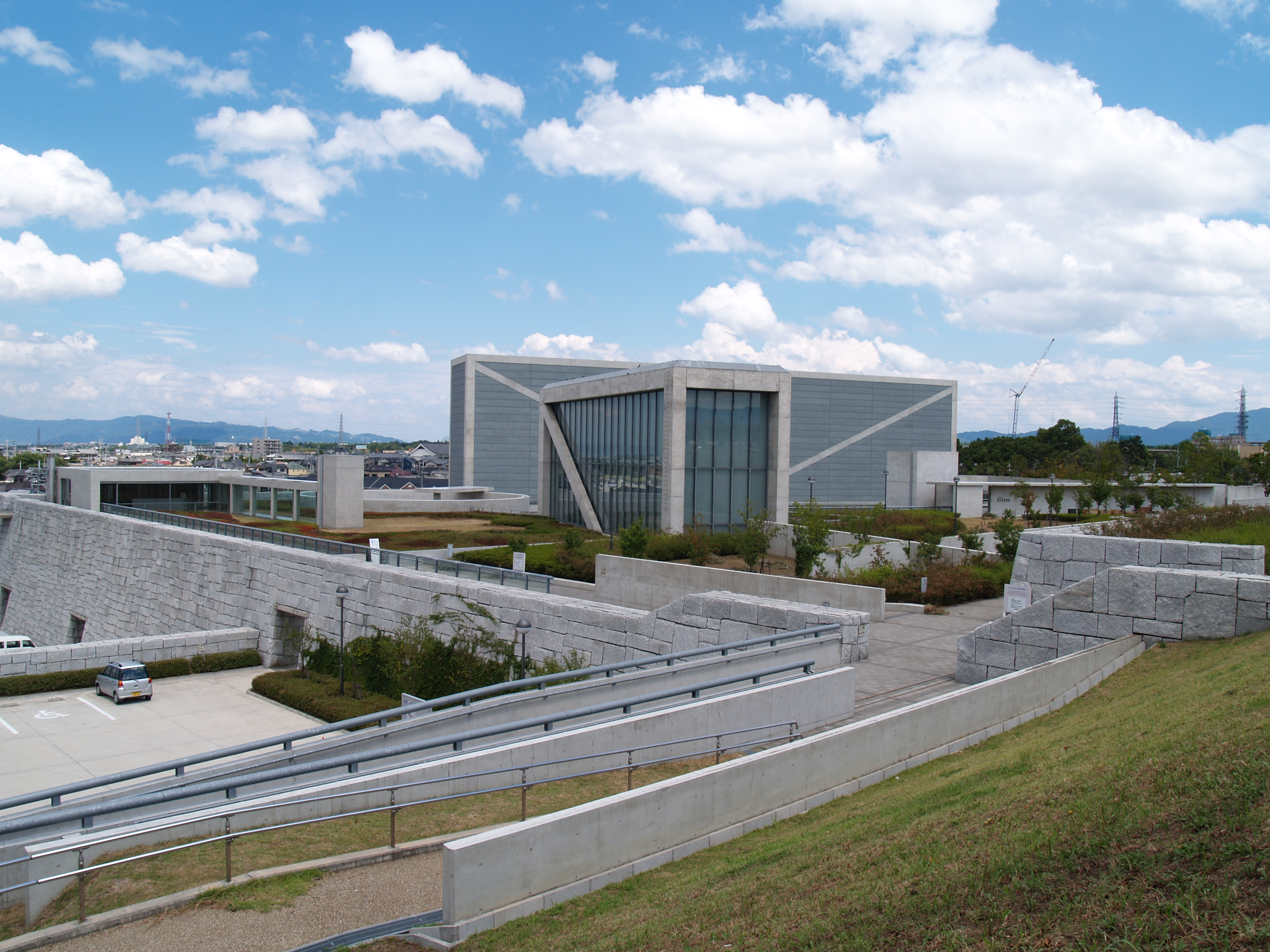
Osaka Prefectural Sayamaike Museum

== See also ==
- List of Historic Sites of Japan (Osaka)
