= Tatsuhiro Tamura =

Japanese baseball player (born 1994)

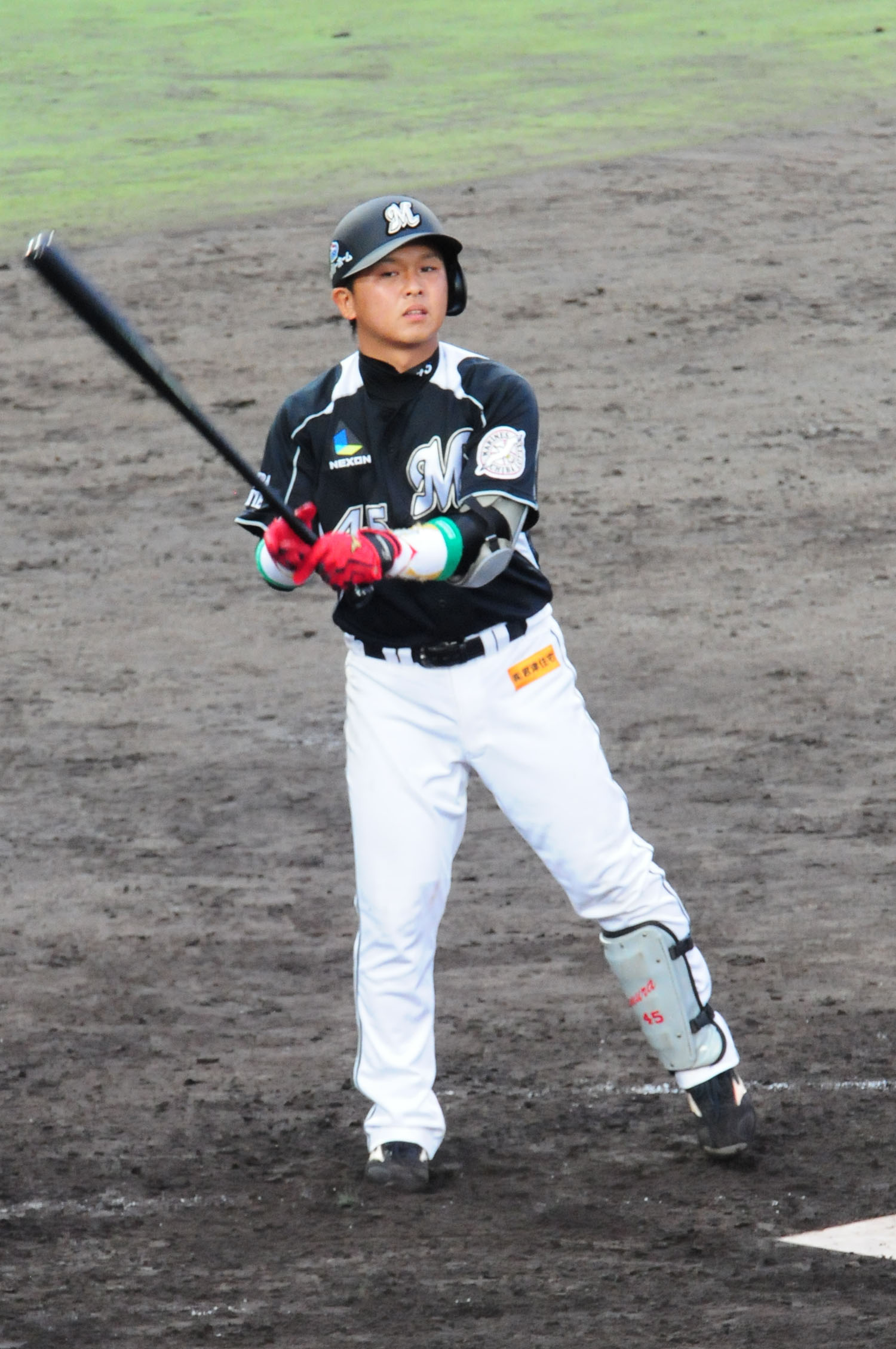
- Tamura with the Chiba Lotte Marines

Chiba Lotte Marines – No. 22
- Catcher
- Born: May 13, 1994 (age 32); Ōsakasayama, Osaka
- Bats: Right Throws: Right

debut
- July 14, 2013, for the Chiba Lotte Marines

Career statistics (through 2024 season)
- Batting average: .221
- Home runs: 19
- Runs batted in: 253
- Stats at Baseball Reference

Teams
- Chiba Lotte Marines (2013–present)

Career highlights and awards
- 1× NPB All-Star (2016); 1× Best Nine Award (2016)

Tatsuhiro Tamura (田村 龍弘, Tamura Tatsuhiro; born May 13, 1994), is a Japanese professional baseball catcher. He currently plays for the Chiba Lotte Marines of the NPB.

On February 27, 2019, he was selected for Japan national baseball team at the 2019 exhibition games against Mexico.
