= Ishizugawa Station =

Railway station in Sakai, Japan

Ishizugawa Station 石津川駅
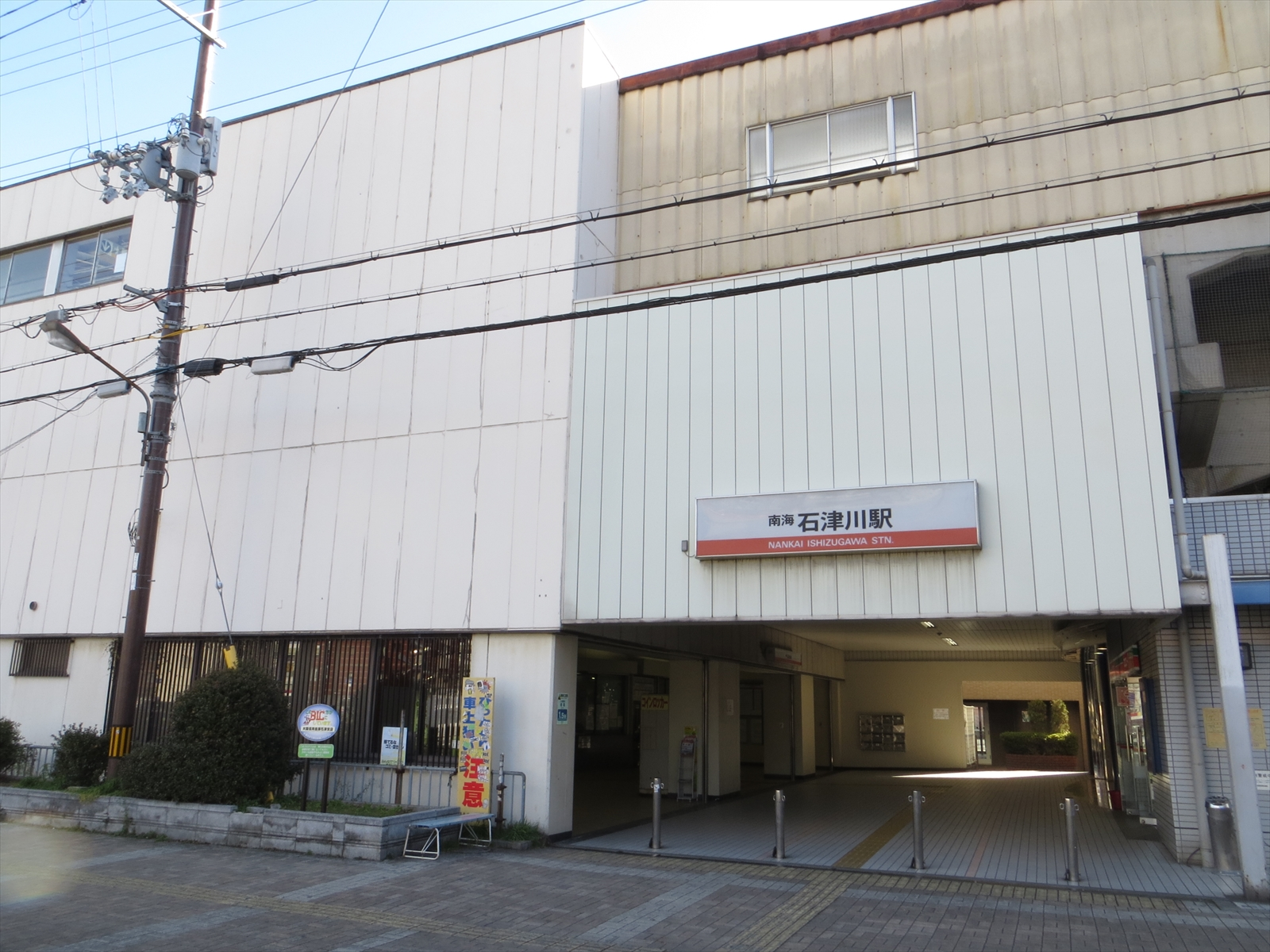
- Ishizugawa Station in February 2015

General information
- Location: 15-19, Hamadera-Ishizu-cho Naka 3-cho, Nishi-ku, Sakai-shi, Osaka-fu 592-8334; Japan
- Coordinates: 34°33′34″N 135°27′11″E
- Operator: Nankai Electric Railway
- Line: Nankai Main Line
- Distance: 12.7 km from Namba
- Platforms: 2 side platforms
- Connections: Bus stop

Other information
- Station code: NK13
- Website: Official website

History
- Opened: 1 June 1919; 107 years ago

Passengers
- 2019: 14,488 daily
Location
- Location within Osaka Prefecture Location within Japan

Ishizugawa Station (石津川駅, Ishizugawa-eki) is a passenger railway station located in Nishi-ku, Sakai, Osaka Prefecture, Japan, operated by the private railway operator Nankai Electric Railway. It has the station number "NK13".

== Lines ==
Ishizugawa Station is served by the Nankai Main Line, and is 12.7 kilometers (7.9 mi) from the terminus of the line at Nanba.

== Layout ==
The station consists of two opposed elevated side platforms with the station building underneath.

=== Platforms ===
1	■ Nankai Main Line	for Wakayamashi and Kansai Airport
2	■ Nankai Main Line	for Namba

== Adjacent stations ==
«	Service	»
Nankai Main Line
Limited Express "rapi:t α" for Kansai Airport (特急ラピートα): Does not stop at this station
Limited Express "rapi:t β" (特急ラピートβ): Does not stop at this station
Limited Express "Southern" (特急サザン): Does not stop at this station
Limited Express without seat reservations (自由席特急): Does not stop at this station
Express (急行): Does not stop at this station
Airport Express (空港急行): Does not stop at this station
Sub. Express (区間急行): Does not stop at this station
Minato	Semi-Express for Namba (準急, in the morning on weekdays)	Suwanomori
Minato	Local (普通車)	Suwanomori

== History ==
Ishizugawa Station opened on 1 June 1919.

== Passenger statistics ==
In fiscal 2019, the station was used by an average of 14,488 passengers daily.

== Surrounding area ==
- Ishizugawa River
- Sakai Senboku Seaside Industrial Zone
- Sakai City Hamadera Ishizuchu Elementary School

== See also ==
- List of railway stations in Japan
