= Sayama Domain =

Feudal domain in Kawachi Province, Japan

Sayama Domain 狭山藩
- under Tokugawa shogunate Japan
- 1661–1871
- Capital: Sayama jin'ya
- Area
  - Coordinates: 34°30′30″N 135°33′18″E
- Government
  - Type: Daimyō
- Historical era: Edo period
  - Established: 1661
  - Disestablished: 1871
- Today part of: part of Osaka Prefecture

Location of Sayama jin'ya
Sayama Domain (Japan)

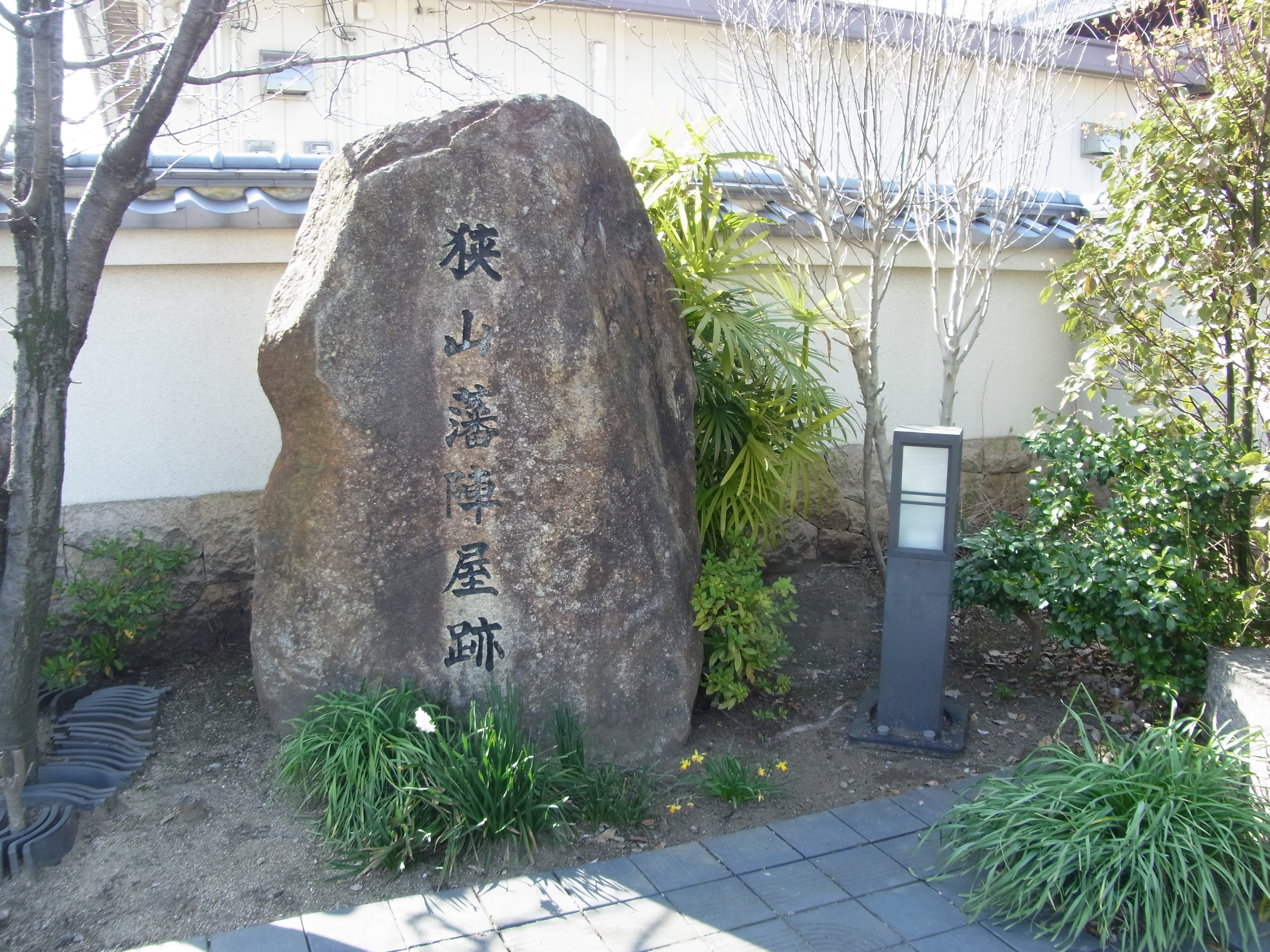
Monument marking the site of the Sayama jin'ya

Sayama Domain (狭山藩, Sayama-han) was a feudal domain under the Tokugawa shogunate of Edo period Japan, located in Kawachi Province in what is now the southeastern portion of modern-day Osaka Prefecture. It was centered around the Sayama jin'ya which was located in what is now the city of Ōsakasayama and was controlled by the tozama daimyō Hōjō clan throughout all of its history.

== History ==
The Later Hōjō clan descendent from Hōjō Sōun were among the greatest of the Sengoku period daimyō, ruling most of the Kantō region of Japan from their massive stronghold at Odawara Castle. However, the clan's power was destroyed by Toyotomi Hideyoshi in the 1590 Siege of Odawara. Hōjō Ujinao was spared since he was married to Tokuhime, the second daughter of Tokugawa Ieyasu, and the couple were exiled to Mount Kōya, where Ujinao died the following year. Ujinao had no son, but the Hōjō lineage was continued through the adoption of Hōjō Ujinori, the fourth son of Hōjō Ujiyasu. Tokugawa Ieyasu had given him estates with a kokudaka of 7000 koku in Kawachi Province, thus raising him to the status of hatamoto, and his son Hōjō Ujimori has estates with a kokudaka of 4000 koku in Shimotsuke Province. On Ujinori's death in 1600, Ujimori inherited his father's fiefs, thus giving him a combined kokudaka of 11,000 koku, which qualified him for the title of daimyō under the Tokugawa shogunate. This marked the start of Sayama Domain, which the Hōjō clan would rule for 12 generations until the Meiji restoration.

Hōjō Ujimori ruled from his residence in Osaka, it was his son, Hōjō Ujinobu, who constructed the jin'ya in Sayama. The third daimyō, Hōjō Ujimune, was an alcoholic, and was unable to fulfill his duties at Edo Castle, and his adopted son Hōjō Ujiharu, was not able to receive official confirmation of his succession, largely due to the opposition of the rōjū Inaba Masanori, who sought to use Hōjō Ujimune's illness as a cause for attainder. Inaba succeeded in having the domain abolished; however almost simultaneously, the tairō Sakai Tadakiyo granted a new fief with a kokudaka of 10,000 koku, thus preserving the clan's status.

In 1760, the 7th daimyō, Hōjō Ujiyoshi, unsuccessful attempted political and fiscal reforms in the domain over entrenched opposition. In 1848, the 11th daimyō, Hōjō Ujiyoshi, built the han school, "Kanshukan" which he opened also to samurai from other domains.

During the Bakumatsu period, the domain was called upon to dispatch troops to quell the Oshio Heihachiro uprising of 1837, to guard Osaka Bay during the incursion of Russian Admiral Yevfimiy Putyatin in 1849, and to suppress the Tenchūgumi in 1863. At the start of the Boshin War, the domain pledged fealty to the imperial side; however, the domain's finances (which had been in a state of near collapse since the middle of the Edo period due to huge debts) could not support further military spending or dispatch of troops. The final daimyō, Hōjō Ujiyasu, surrendered the domain to the Meiji government in 1869 without waiting for the abolition of the han system in 1871 and refused the position of imperial governor. The domain was annexed to Sakai Prefecture.

The north gate of the jin'ya was relocated to the temple of Hongan-ji Sakai Betsuin in 1881.Sakai prefecture was later absorbed into Osaka Prefecture, and Hōjō Ujiyasu became a viscount under the kazoku peerage in 1884.

== Holdings at the end of the Edo period ==
As with most domains in the han system, Sayama Domain consisted of several discontinuous territories calculated to provide the assigned kokudaka, based on periodic cadastral surveys and projected agricultural yields.

- Kawachi Province
  - 13 villages in Nishigori District
  - 2 villages in Furuichi District
  - 2 villages in Ogata District
  - 1 village in Kawachi District
  - 5 villages in Tannan District
  - 5 villages in Tanboku District
- Ōmi Province
  - 1 village in Shiga District
  - 3 villages in Kurita District
  - 2 villages in Yasu District
  - 1 village in Koga District

== List of daimyō ==
#	Name	Tenure	Courtesy title	Court Rank	kokudaka
Hōjō clan, 1600-1868 (Tozama)
1	Hōjō Ujimori (北条氏盛)	1600 - 1608	Mino-no-kami (美濃守)	Junior 5th Rank, Lower Grade (従五位下)	11,000 koku
2	Hōjō Ujinobu (北条氏信)	1608 - 1625	Mino-no-kami (美濃守)	Junior 5th Rank, Lower Grade (従五位下)	11,000 koku
3	Hōjō Ujimune (北条氏宗)	1625 - 1670	-none-	-none-	11,000->3500 koku
4	Hōjō Ujiharu (北条氏治)	1670 - 1696	Mino-no-kami (美濃守)	Junior 5th Rank, Lower Grade (従五位下)	10,000 koku
5	Hōjō Ujitomo (北条氏朝)	1696 - 1735	Tōtōmi-no-kami (遠江守)	Junior 5th Rank, Lower Grade (従五位下)	10,000 koku
6	Hōjō Ujisada (北条氏貞)	1735 - 1758	Mino-no-kami (美濃守)	Junior 5th Rank, Lower Grade (従五位下)	10,000 koku
7	Hōjō Ujiyoshi (北条氏彦)	1758 - 1769	Mino-no-kami (美濃守)	Junior 5th Rank, Lower Grade (従五位下)	10,000 koku
8	Hōjō Ujiakira (北条氏昉)	1769 - 1801	Sagami-no-kami (相模守)	Junior 5th Rank, Lower Grade (従五位下)	10,000 koku
9	Hōjō Ujitaka (北条氏喬)	1801 - 1842	Tōtōmi-no-kami (遠江守)	Junior 5th Rank, Lower Grade (従五位下)	10,000 koku
10	Hōjō Ujihisa (北条氏久)	1842 - 1852	Sagami-no-kami (相模守)	Junior 5th Rank, Lower Grade (従五位下)	10,000 koku
11	Hōjō Ujiyoshi (北条氏燕)	1852 - 1861	Tōtōmi-no-kami (遠江守)	Junior 5th Rank, Lower Grade (従五位下)	10,000 koku
12	Hōjō Ujiyuki (北条氏恭)	1861 - 1869	Sagami-no-kami (相模守)	Junior 5th Rank, Lower Grade (従五位下)	10,000 koku

== See also ==
- Abolition of the han system
- List of Han
