= Sayama (surname) =

Sayama (written: 佐山) is a Japanese surname. Notable people with the surname include:

- Ayaka Sayama (佐山 彩香; born 1993), Japanese gravure idol
- Jackson Sayama (ジャクソン・サヤマ; born 1996/1997), American politician
- Kiyoko Sayama (佐山 聖子), Japanese animator and director
- Masahiro Sayama (佐山 雅弘; 1953–2018), Japanese pianist
- Momoko Sayama (左山 桃子; born 1992), Japanese footballer
- Satoru Sayama (佐山 聡; born 1957), Japanese writer, professional wrestler, mixed martial artist
