= Kitanoda Station =

Railway station in Sakai, Japan

Kitanoda Station 北野田駅
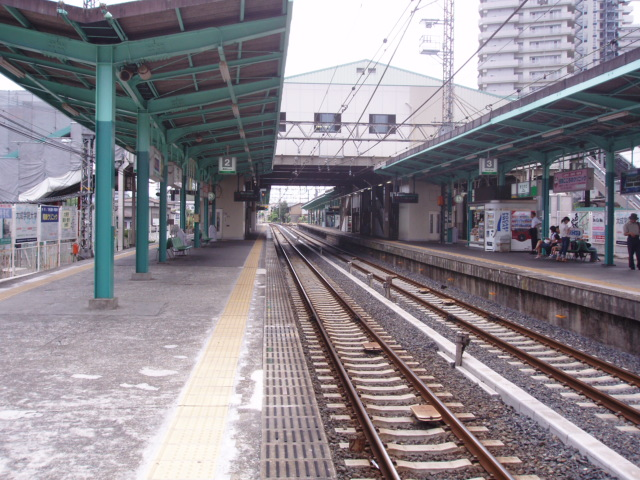
- Kitanoda Station platforms in August 2006

General information
- Location: 51-4, Kitanoda, Higashi-ku, Sakai-shi, Osaka-fu Osaka 599-8123; Japan
- Coordinates: 34°31′22.8″N 135°32′35.4″E
- Operator: Nankai Electric Railway
- Line: Koya Line
- Distance: 19.3 km from Shiomibashi
- Platforms: 2 island platforms
- Tracks: 4
- Connections: Bus terminal

Other information
- Station code: NK63
- Website: Official website

History
- Opened: August 7, 1914

Passengers
- 2019: 33,659 daily
Location
- Location within Osaka Prefecture Location within Japan

Kitanoda Station (北野田駅, Kitanoda-eki) is a passenger railway station located in Higashi-ku, Sakai, Osaka Prefecture, Japan, operated by the private railway operator Nankai Electric Railway. It has the station number "NK63".

== Lines ==
Kitanoda Station is served by the Nankai Koya Line, and is 19.3 kilometers from the terminus of the line at Shiomibashi and 18.6 kilometers from Nanba.

== Layout ==
The station consists of two island platforms with an elevated station building.

=== Platforms ===
1, 2	■ Koya Line	for Koyasan
3, 4	■ Koya Line	for Namba

== Adjacent stations ==
«	Service	»
Koya Line
Hagiharatenjin	Local	Sayama
Hagiharatenjin	Semi-Express for Namba	Sayama
Sakaihigashi	Sub Express	Sayama
Sakaihigashi	Express	Kongō
Sakaihigashi	Rapid Express	Kongō
Limited Express "Koya", "Rinkan": Does not stop at this station

== History ==
Kitanoda Station opened on August 7, 1914.

== Passenger statistics ==
In fiscal 2019, the station was used by an average of 33,659 passengers daily.

== Surrounding area ==
- Sakai City East Cultural Center
- Sakai City East Library
- Sakai City Tomiokahigashi Elementary School
- Sakai City Tomiokanishi Elementary School
- Noda Castle ruins

== See also ==
- List of railway stations in Japan
