= Sayama Station =

Railway station in Ōsakasayama, Osaka Prefecture, Japan

Sayama Station 狭山駅
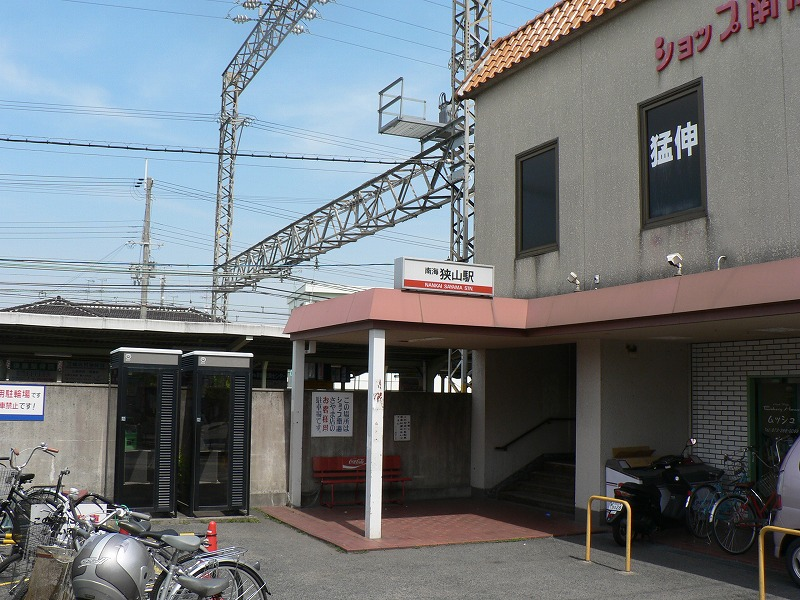
- West exit

General information
- Location: 1-1, Ikejirinaka 1-chome, Ōsakasayama, Osaka 589-0009; Japan
- Coordinates: 34°30′59″N 135°32′55″E
- Operator: Nankai Electric Railway
- Line: Koya Line
- Distance: 20.2 km from Shiomibashi
- Platforms: 2 side platforms
- Connections: Bus terminal

Other information
- Station code: NK64
- Website: Official website

History
- Opened: January 30, 1898

Passengers
- 2019: 6,000 daily
Location
- Location within Osaka Prefecture Location within Japan

Sayama Station (狭山駅, Sayama-eki) is a passenger railway station located in the city of Ōsakasayama, Osaka Prefecture, Japan, operated by the private railway operator Nankai Electric Railway. It has the station number "NK64".

== Lines ==
Sayama Station is served by the Nankai Koya Line, and is 20.2 kilometers from the terminus of the line at Shiomibashi and 19.5 kilometers from Nanba.

== Layout ==
The station consists of two ground-level opposed side platforms connected by an elevated station building.

=== Platforms ===
1	■ Koya Line	for Koyasan
2	■ Koya Line	for Namba

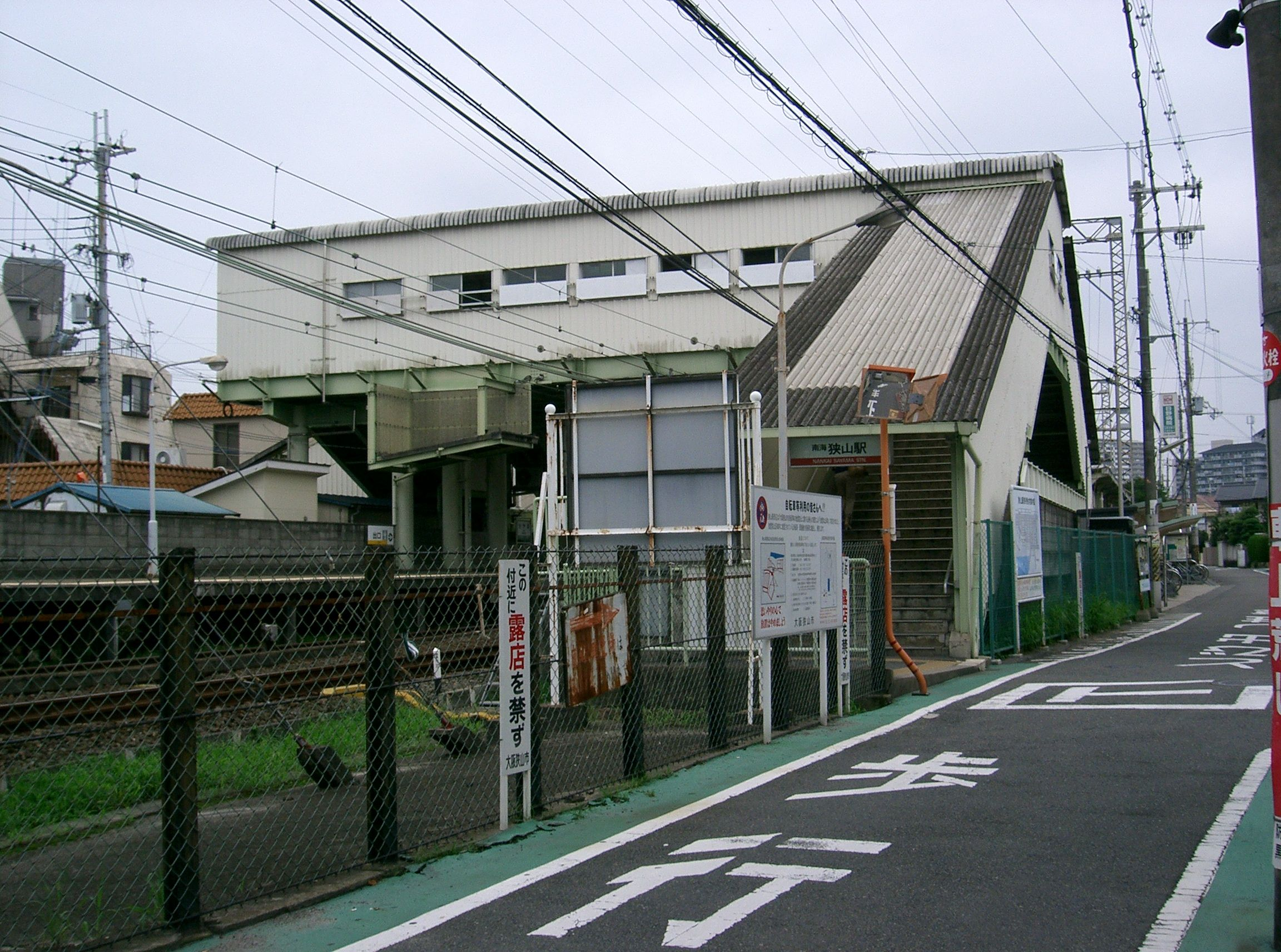
East exit

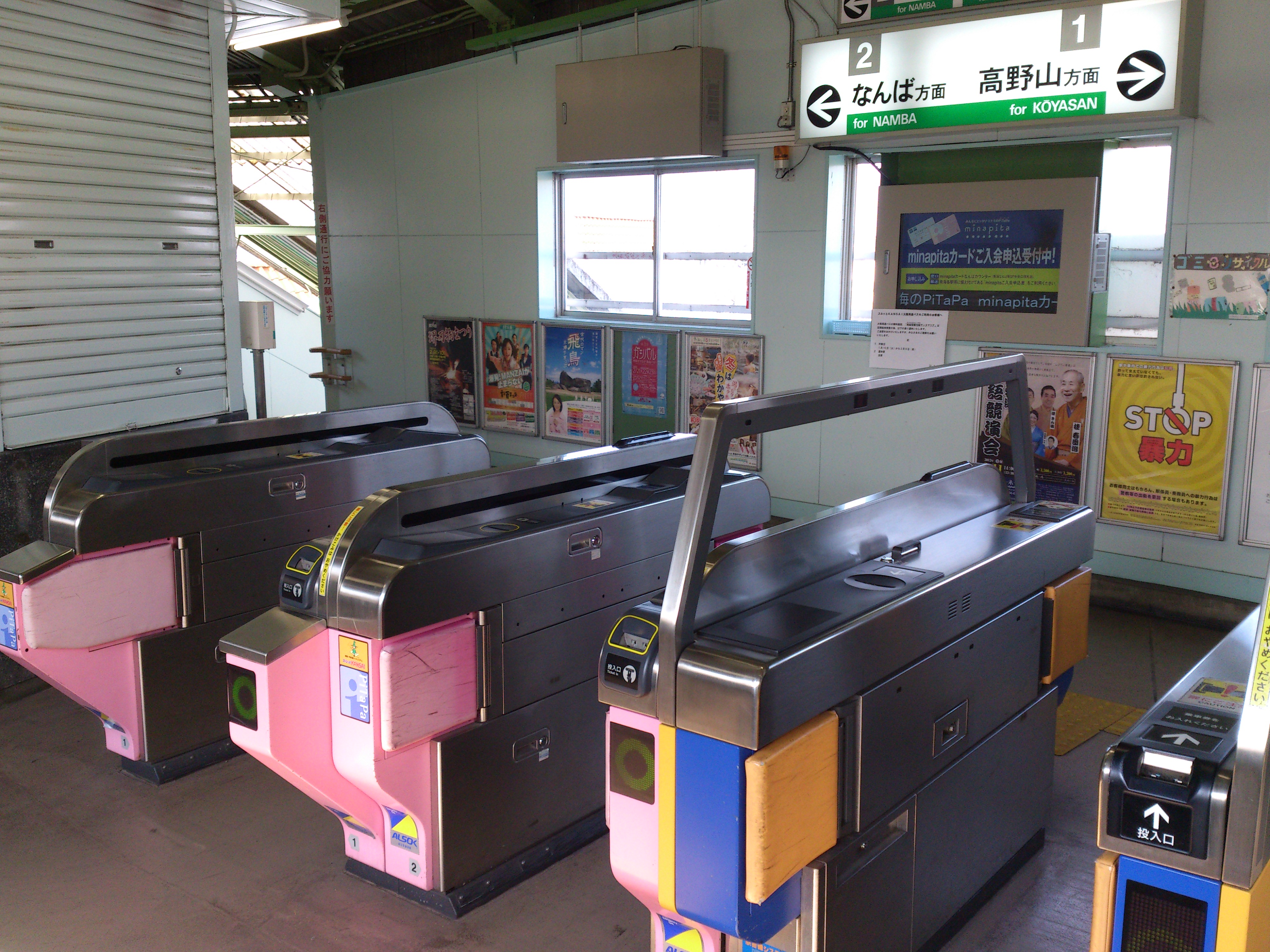
Ticket gates

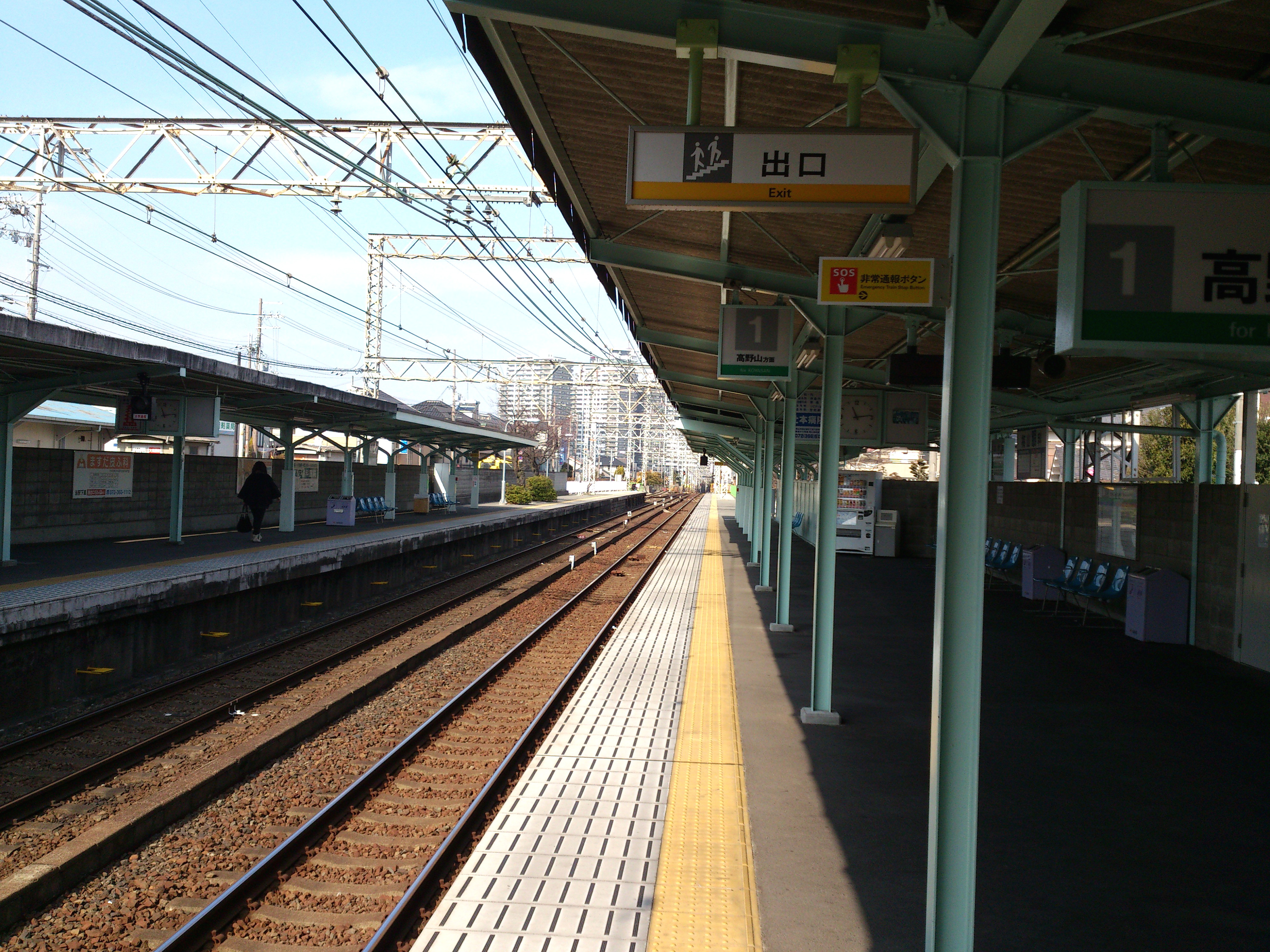
Platform

== Adjacent stations ==
«	Service	»
Nankai Electric Railway Koya Line
Limited Express "Koya", "Rinkan": Does not stop at this station
Rapid Express: Does not stop at this station
Express: Does not stop at this station
Kitanoda	Sub Express	Ōsakasayamashi
Kitanoda	Semi-Express for Namba	Ōsakasayamashi
Kitanoda	Local	Ōsakasayamashi

== History ==
Sayama Station opened on January 30, 1898.

== Passenger statistics ==
In fiscal 2019, the station was used by an average of 6,000 passengers daily.

== Surrounding area ==
- Nankai Sayama Harmony Town
- Osaka Sayama City Kita Elementary School
- Osaka Hatsushiba Gakuen Kitanoda Campus

== See also ==
- List of railway stations in Japan
