= Kawachinagano =

Kawachinagano 河内長野市
- City
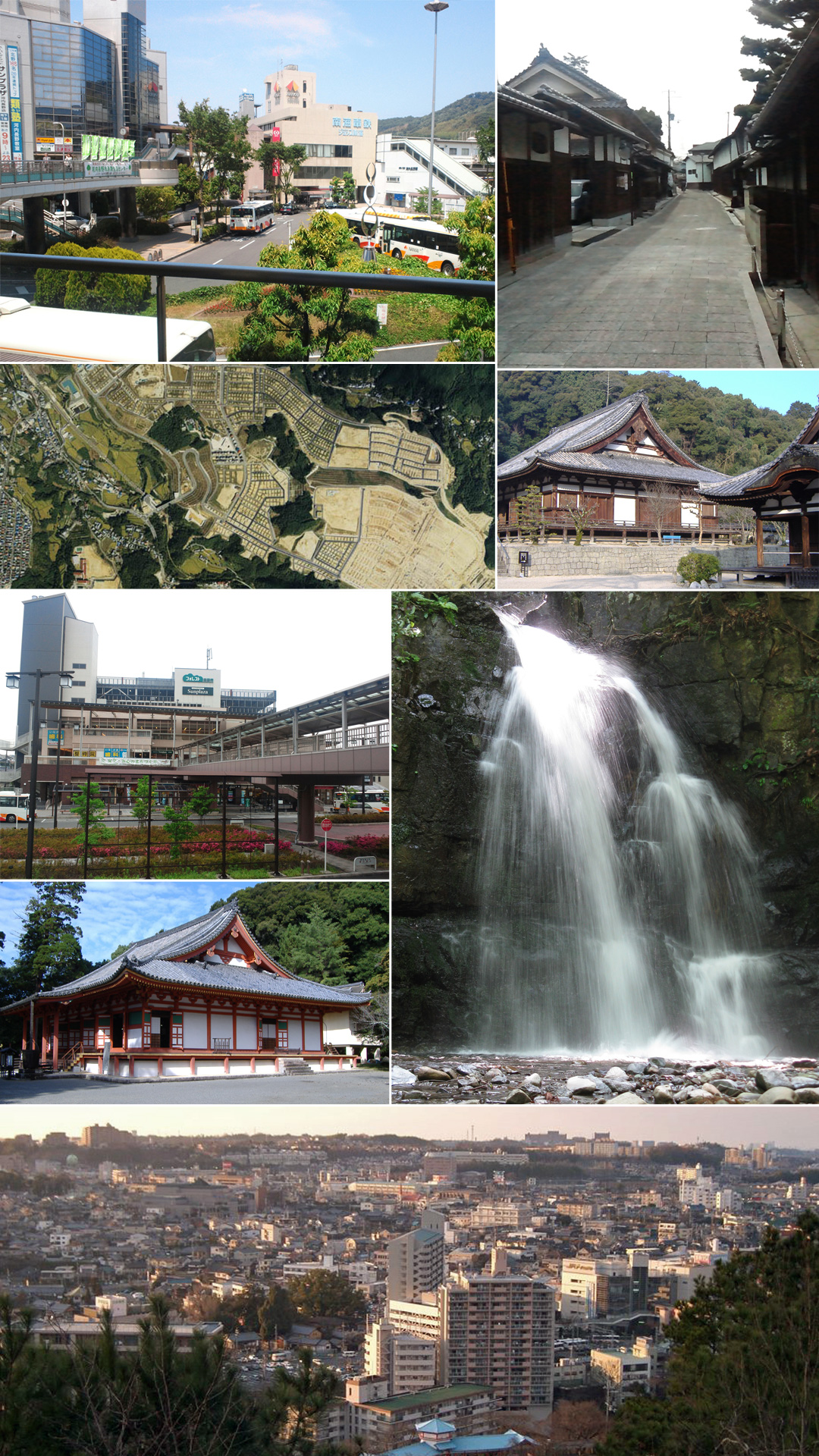
- Kawachinagano Station, Kōya Kaido, Mikanodai, Kongō-ji, Mikkaichi Station, Kanshin-ji, Takihata 48 Waterfalls, View of Center in Kawachinagano

- Flag Emblem

- Location of Kawachinagano in Osaka Prefecture

- Location in Japan
- Coordinates: 34°28′N 135°34′E
- Country: Japan
- Region: Kansai
- Prefecture: Osaka

Government
  - Mayor: Shuhei Nishino

Area
  - Total: 109.63 km^{2} (42.33 sq mi)

Population (January 1, 2022)
  - Total: 101,649
  - Density: 927.20/km^{2} (2,401.4/sq mi)
- Time zone: UTC+09:00 (JST)
- City hall address: 1-1-1, Harachō, Kawachinagano-shi, Ōsaka-fu 586-8501
- Website: Official website
- Symbols
- Flower: Chrysanthemum
- Tree: Camphor laurel

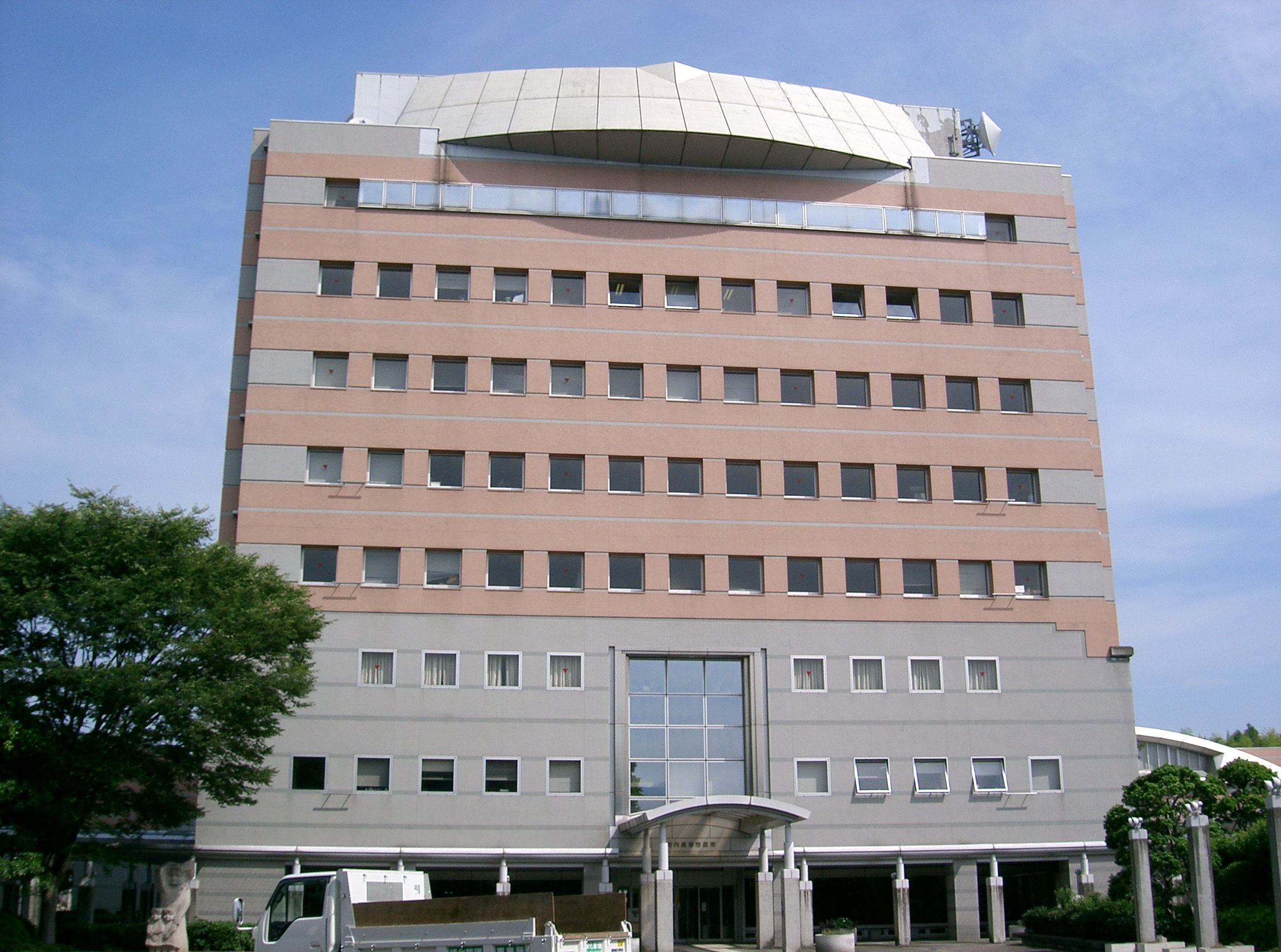
Kawachinagano City Hall

Kawachinagano (河内長野市, Kawachinagano-shi) is a city located in Osaka Prefecture, Japan. As of 31 January 2022, the city had an estimated population of 101,649 in 47493 households and a population density of 930 persons per km^{2}. The total area of the city is 109.63 square kilometres (42.33 sq mi).

== Geography ==
Kawachinagano is located in the southeastern part of Osaka prefecture, separated from Nara and Wakayama Prefectures by the Izumi Mountains and Mount Kongō. The city is roughly triangular in area with the apex at the north. Approximately 70 percent of the city area is forested, and there are two major rivers: the Ishikawa (the larger) and the Amamigawa (a tributary of the Yamato River). In the southern foothills, the tourist name "Okukawachi" is used, and there are many historical sites and buildings. The city center it is about 30 minutes to Namba Station by local rail in central Osaka and about one hour to Kansai International Airport. Much of the city is within the borders of the Kongō-Ikoma-Kisen Quasi-National Park.

=== Neighboring municipalities ===
Nara Prefecture

- Gojō

Osaka Prefecture

- Chihayaakasaka
- Izumi
- Ōsakasayama
- Sakai
- Tondabayashi

Wakayama Prefecture

- Hashimoto
- Katsuragi

== Climate ==
Kawachinagano has a humid subtropical climate (Köppen Cfa) characterized by warm summers and cool winters with light to no snowfall. The average annual temperature in Kawachinagano is 13.9 °C. The average annual rainfall is 1475 mm with September as the wettest month. The temperatures are highest on average in August, at around 26.0 °C, and lowest in January, at around 2.4 °C.

== Demographics ==
Per Japanese census data, the population of Kawachinagano increased steadily over the course of the 20th century and has seen gradual decline in the 21st.

Historical population
Year	Pop.	±%
1920	18,034	—
1930	19,690	+9.2%
1940	22,523	+14.4%
1950	30,681	+36.2%
1960	34,399	+12.1%
1970	51,994	+51.1%
1980	78,572	+51.1%
1990	108,767	+38.4%
2000	121,008	+11.3%
2010	112,518	−7.0%
2020	101,692	−9.6%

== History ==
The area of the modern city of Kawachinagano was within ancient Kawachi Province. Evidence of continuous human settlement since the Japanese Paleolithic period has been found. Numerous kofun burial mounds were built in the area during the Kofun period, and the Asuka period scholar and diplomat Takamuko no Kuromaro came from this area. During the Nara and Heian period, numerous Buddhist temples were built, including Kanshin-ji and Kongō-ji. During the Nanboku-chō period, the area was the site of many conflicts between the Northern Court and the Southern Court. During the Edo Period much of the area came under the control of Sayama Domain, Zeze Domain and Kanbe Domain.

After the Meiji restoration, the area became part of Osaka Prefecture from 1881. The villages of Nagano, Nishigori, Shinno (later renamed Chiyoda), Amano, Mikkaichi, Kawakami, Amami, and Kaga-Tamura and Takamukai were created with the establishment of the modern municipalities system on April 1, 1889. On April 1, 1896, the area became part of Minamikawachi District, Osaka. Nagano was elevated to town status on September 1, 1910. On April 1, 1954, Nagano merged with Mikkaichi, Kawakami, Amami, Kagata, and Takamukai villages to form the city of Kawachinagano.

== Government ==
Kawachinagano has a mayor-council form of government with a directly elected mayor and a unicameral city council of 18 members. Kawachinagano contributes one member to the Osaka Prefectural Assembly. In terms of national politics, the city is part of Osaka 15th district of the lower house of the Diet of Japan.

== Economy ==
Kawachinagano was traditionally known for its toothpick and bamboo blind crafts. Forestry and wood processing remain an important component of the local economy. Industries include metal casting and the brewing of sake. An increasing percentage of the working population is commuting to larger population centers, such as Sakai, Osaka, Hashimoto or Gojo.

== Education ==
Kawachinagano has 13 public elementary schools and seven public middle schools operated by the city government and two public high schools operated by the Osaka Prefectural Department of Education. There are also one private middle school and two private high schools. The Osaka Chiyoda Junior College is located in Kawachinagano

== Transportation ==
=== Railway ===
Nankai Electric Railway - Nankai Kōya Line

- Chiyoda - Kawachinagano - Mikkaichichō - Mikanodai - Chihayaguchi - Amami

Kintetsu Railway - Kintetsu Nagano Line

- Shionomiya - Kawachinagano

=== Highway ===
- National Route 170
- National Route 310
- National Route 371

== Local attractions ==
=== Temples and shrines ===
- Eboshigata Hachiman Jinja
- Emmei-ji
- Iwawaki-ji
- Kanshin-ji
- Kawaidera
- Kongō-ji

=== Nature and parks ===
- Kongō-Ikoma-Kisen Quasi-National Park
- Mount Iwawaki
- Mount Kongō
- Mount Makio
- Nagano Park
- Takihata Dam
- Teragaike
- Teragaike Park

=== Amusement parks ===
- Kansai Cycle Sports Center
- Osaka Prefectural Flowers Garden

== Sister cities ==
- Carmel, Indiana, United States

== Noted people from Kawachinagano ==
- Takuro Fujii, swimmer
- Koichi Fukuda, lead guitarist, programmer and keyboardist
- Asuka Hinoi, singer
- Shinji Tanimura, singer and songwriter
- Hirofumi Yoshimura, politician

== Gallery ==
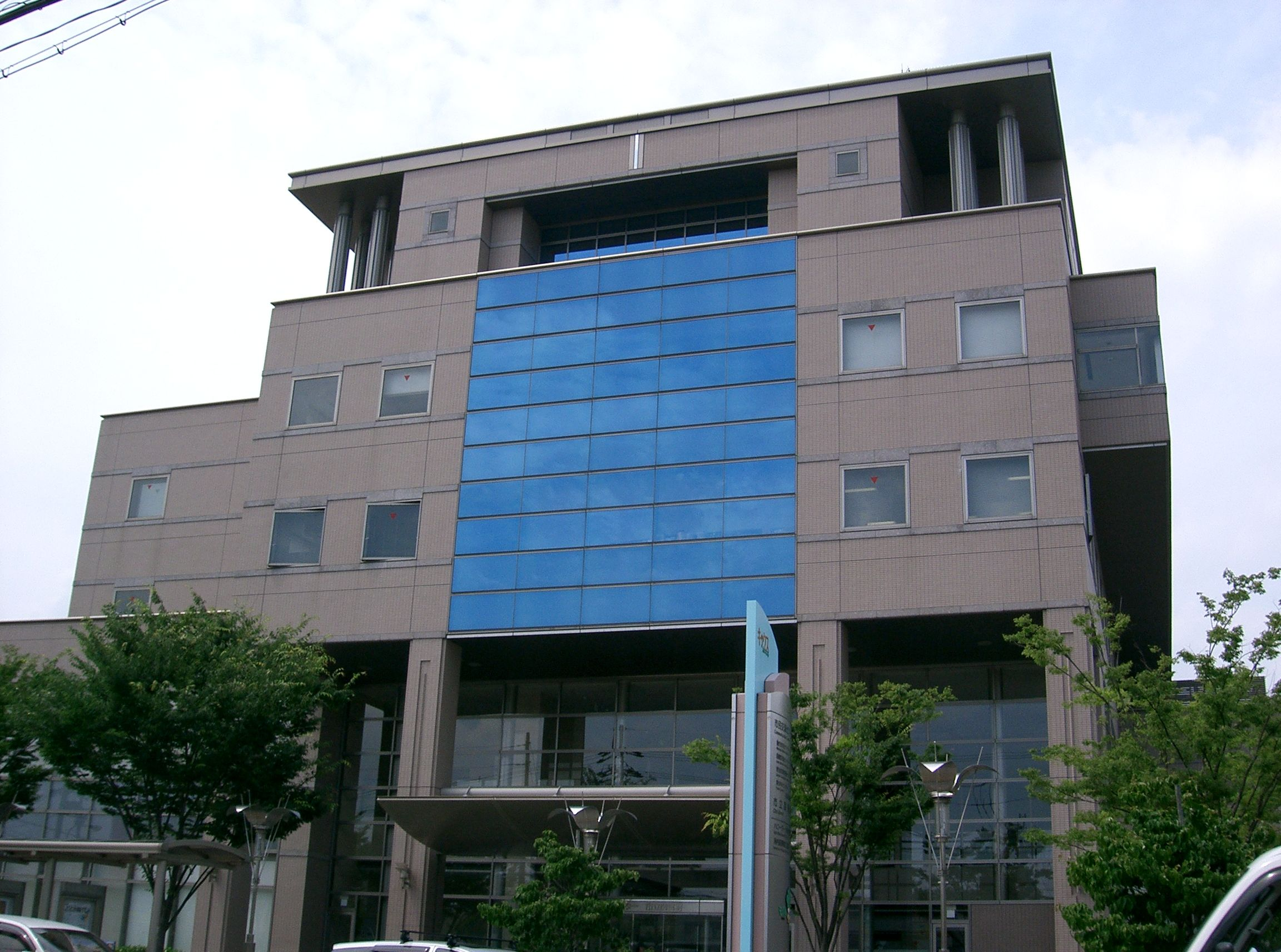
kiccs (Library)

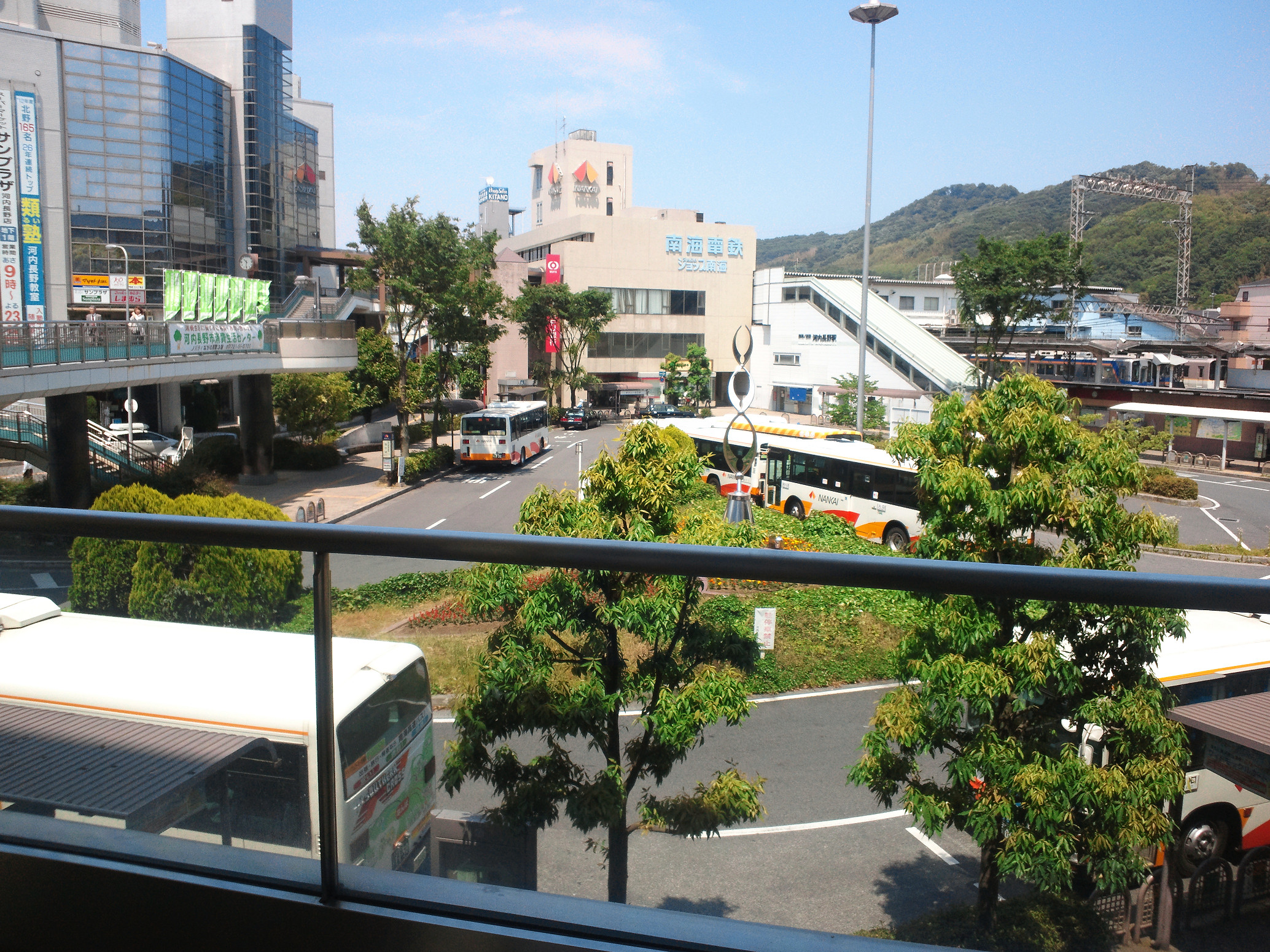
Kawachinagano Station

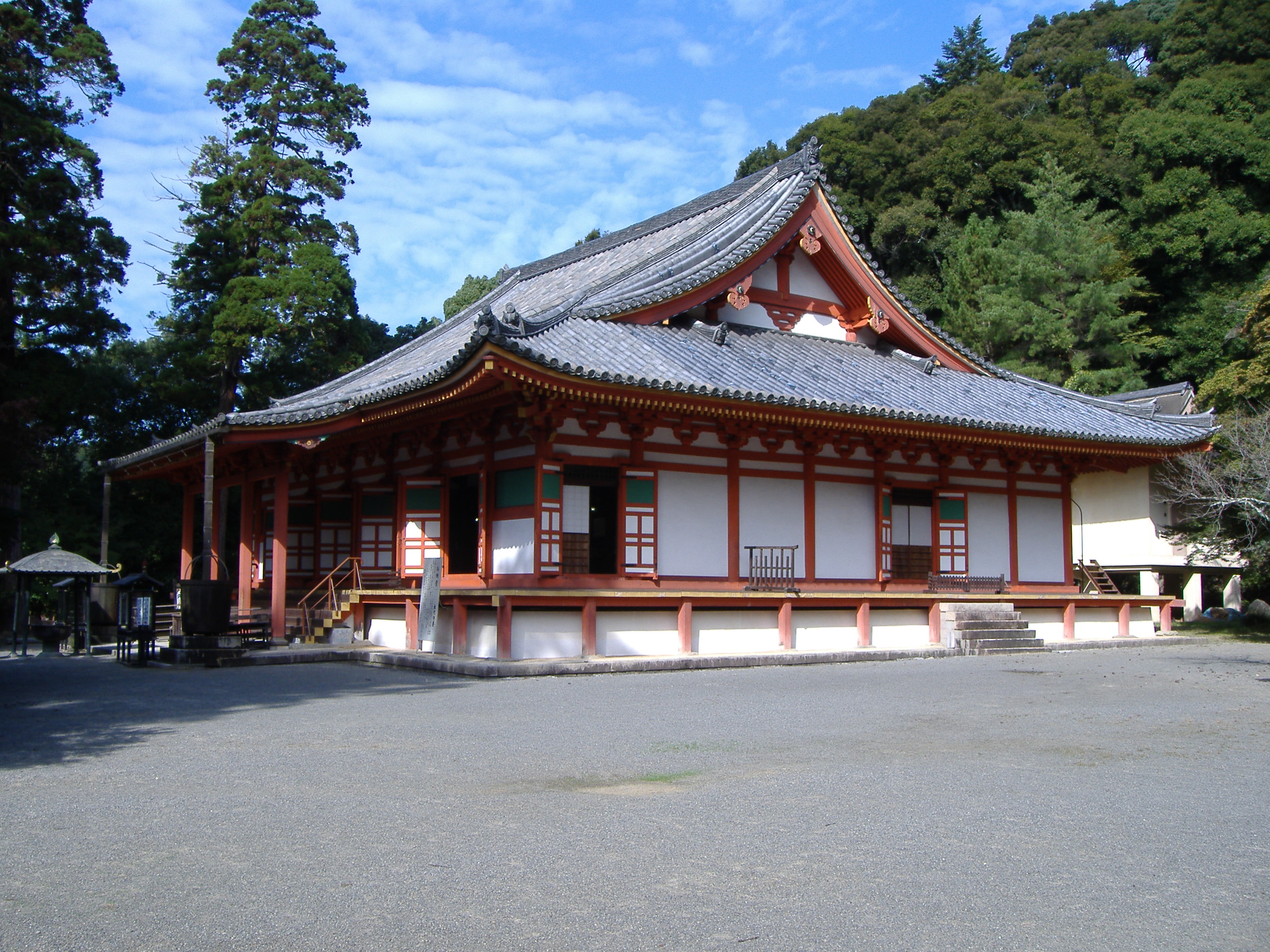
Kanshinji

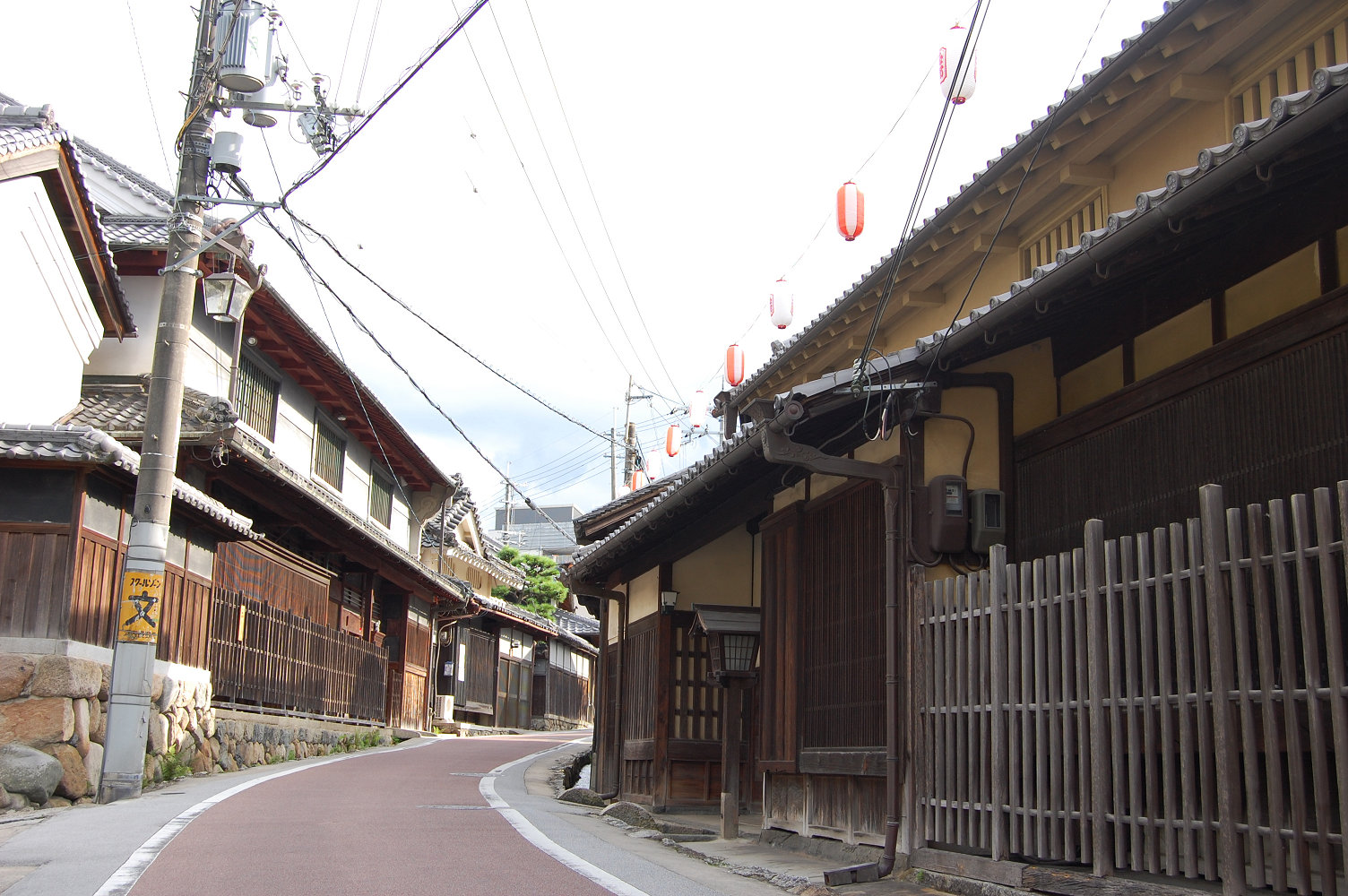
Kōya Kaidō

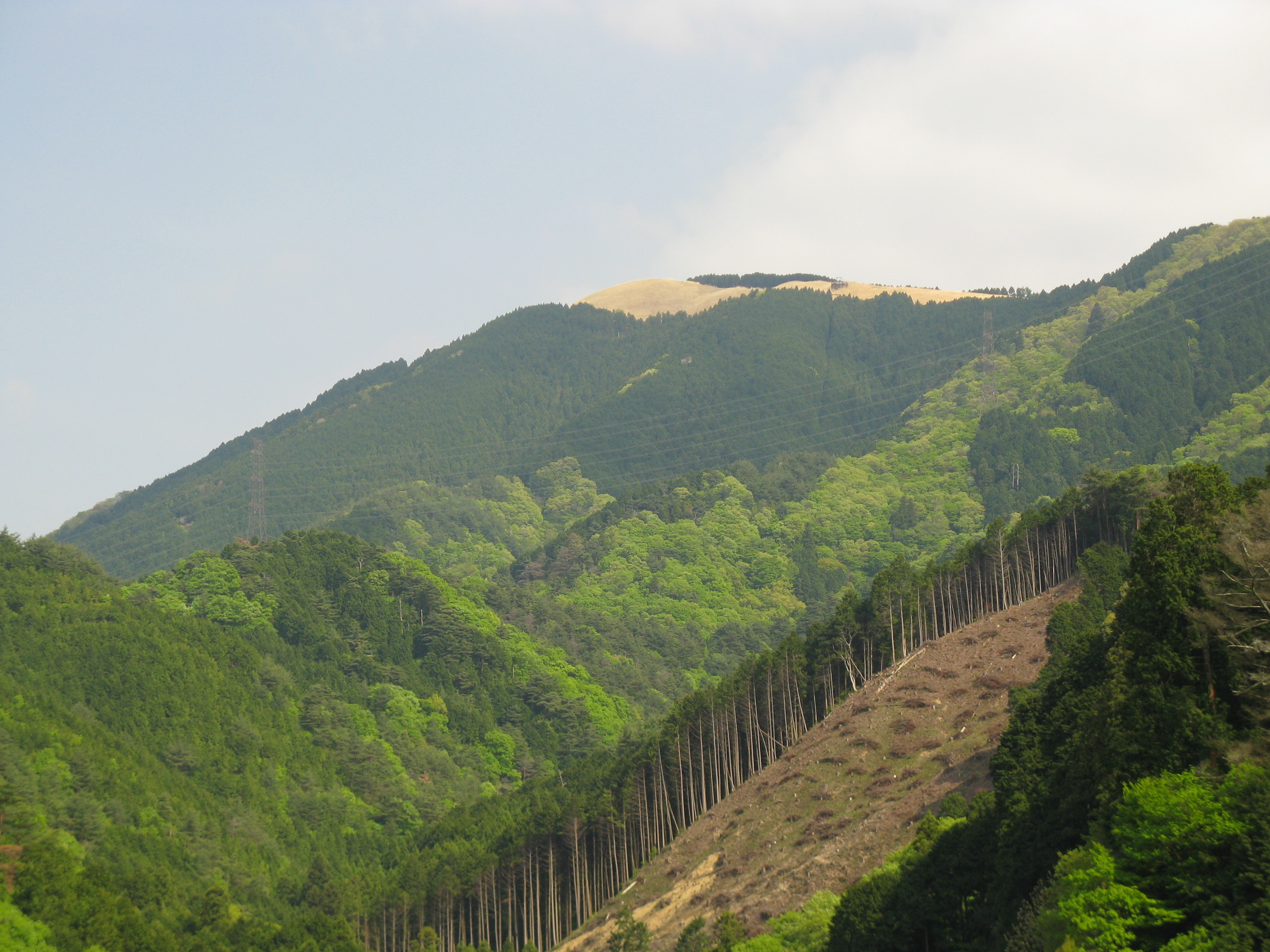
Mt Iwawaki

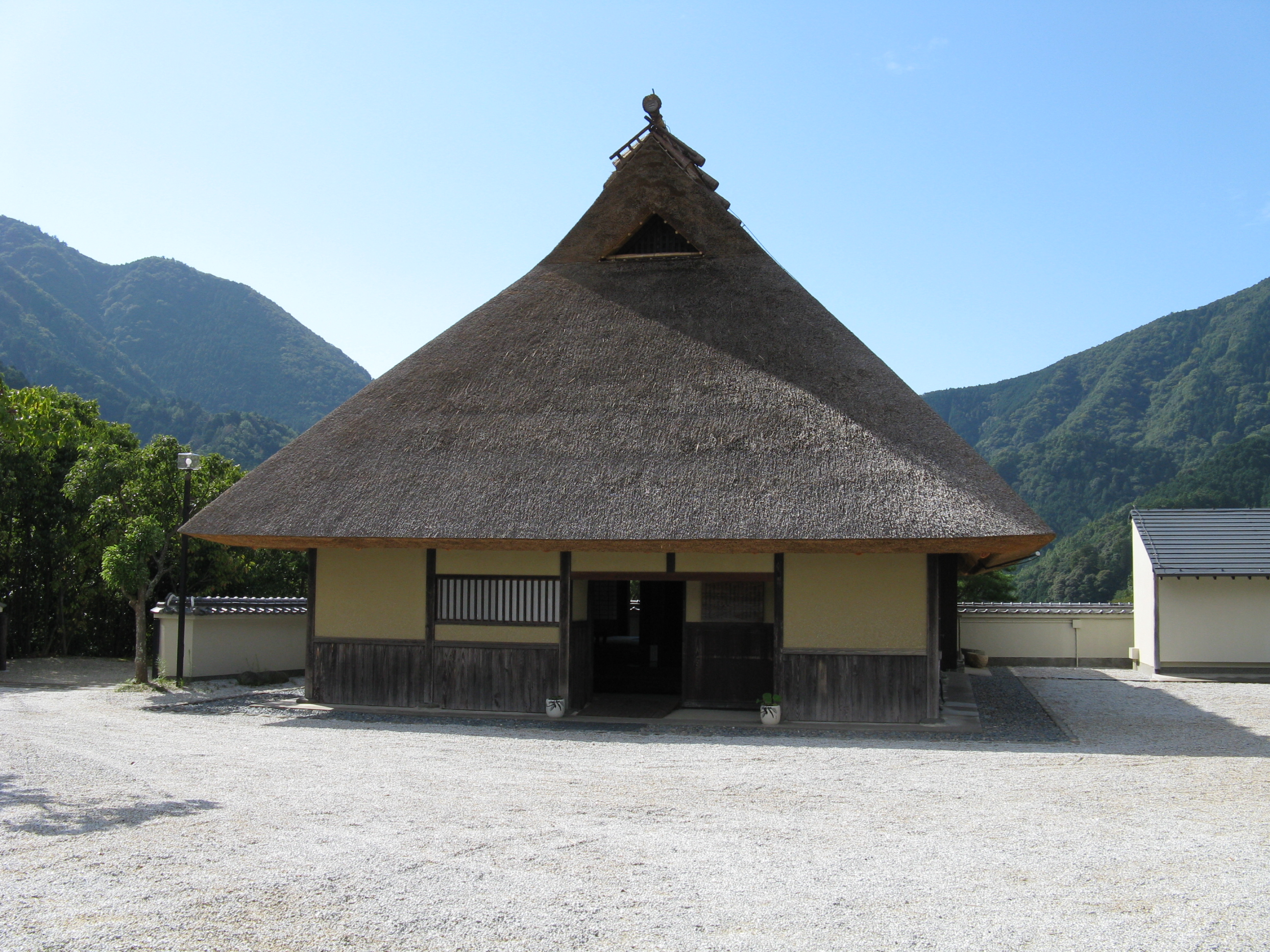
Takihata

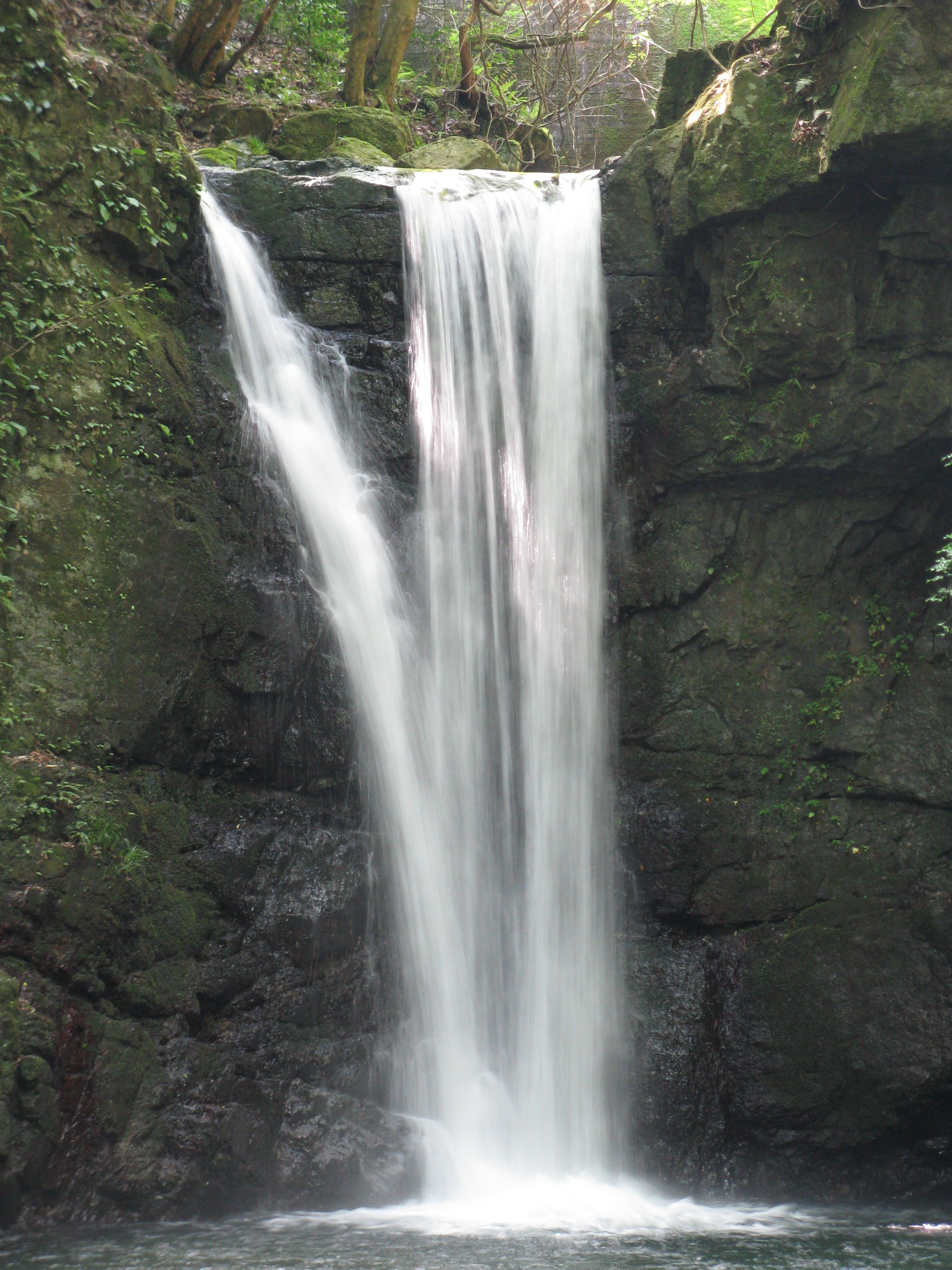
Kōtaki (Takihata 48 Waterfalls)

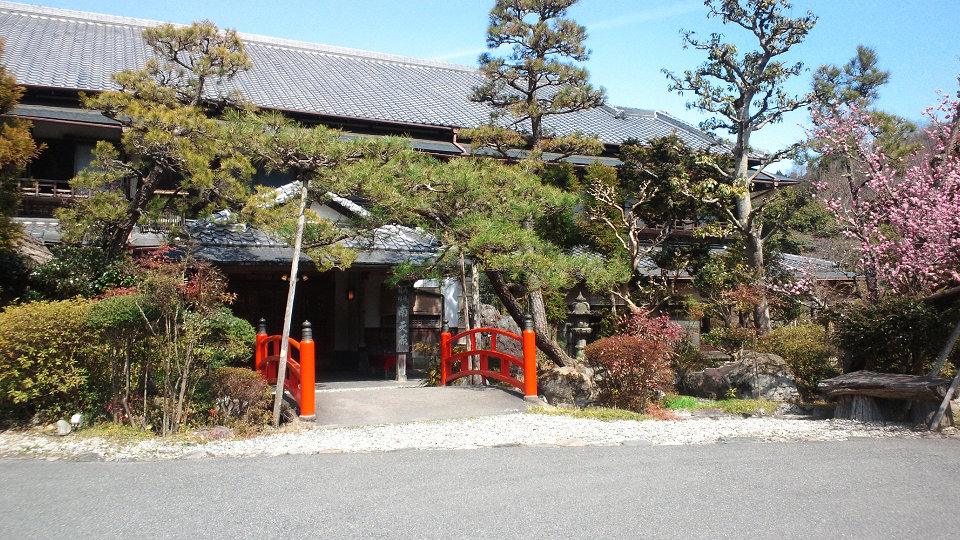
Nantenen (Amami Onsen)
