= Chiyoda Station =

Railway station in Kawachinagano, Osaka Prefecture, Japan

Chiyoda Station 千代田駅
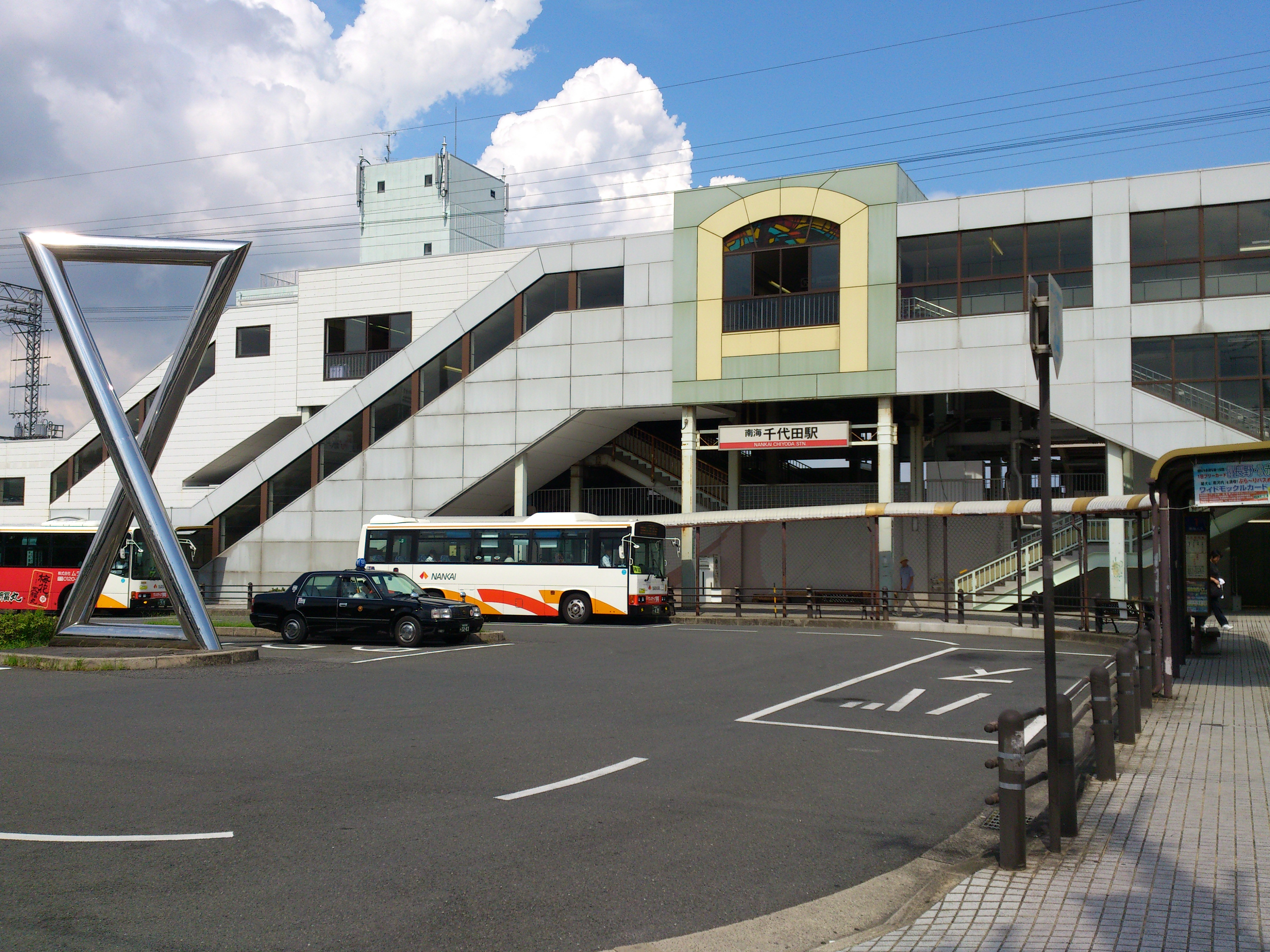
- Station building and bus terminal

General information
- Location: 1-1-13, Kido, Kawachinagano-shi, Osaka-fu 586-0001; Japan
- Coordinates: 34°28′7.9″N 135°33′59.0″E
- Operator: Nankai Electric Railway
- Line: Koya Line
- Distance: 25.9 km from Shiomibashi
- Platforms: 2 side platforms
- Connections: Bus terminal

Other information
- Station code: NK68
- Website: Official website

History
- Opened: January 30, 1898

Passengers
- 2019: 13,435 daily

Services
Preceding station	Nankai Electric Railway	Following station
Takidani towards Namba	Kōya Line Local Sub. Express	Kawachinagano towards Gokurakubashi
Takidani towards Namba	Kōya Line Semi-Express	Kawachinagano One-way operation
Location
- Location within Osaka Prefecture Location within Japan

Chiyoda Station (千代田駅, Chiyoda-eki) is a passenger railway station located in the city of Kawachinagano, Osaka Prefecture, Japan, operated by the private railway operator Nankai Electric Railway. It has the station number "NK68".

== Lines ==
Chiyoda Station is served by the Nankai Koya Line, and is 25.9 kilometers from the terminus of the line at Shiomibashi and 25.2 kilometers from Nanba.

== Layout ==
The station consists of two ground-level opposed side platforms connected by an elevated station building. There is a garage of Nankai Electric Railway in the station south.

=== Platforms ===
1	■ Koya Line (southbound)	for Kōyasan
2	■ Koya Line (northbound)	for Namba

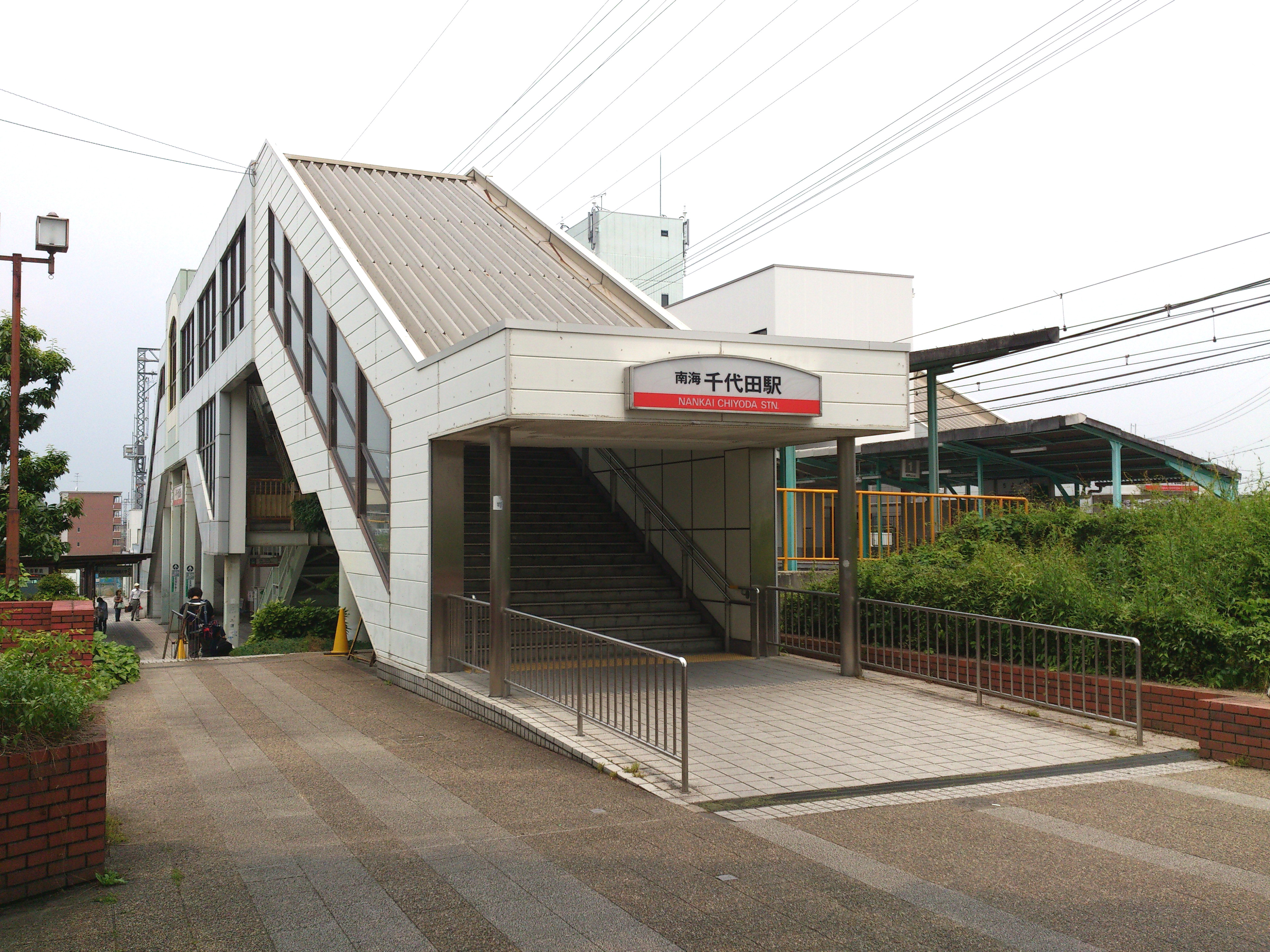
West exit

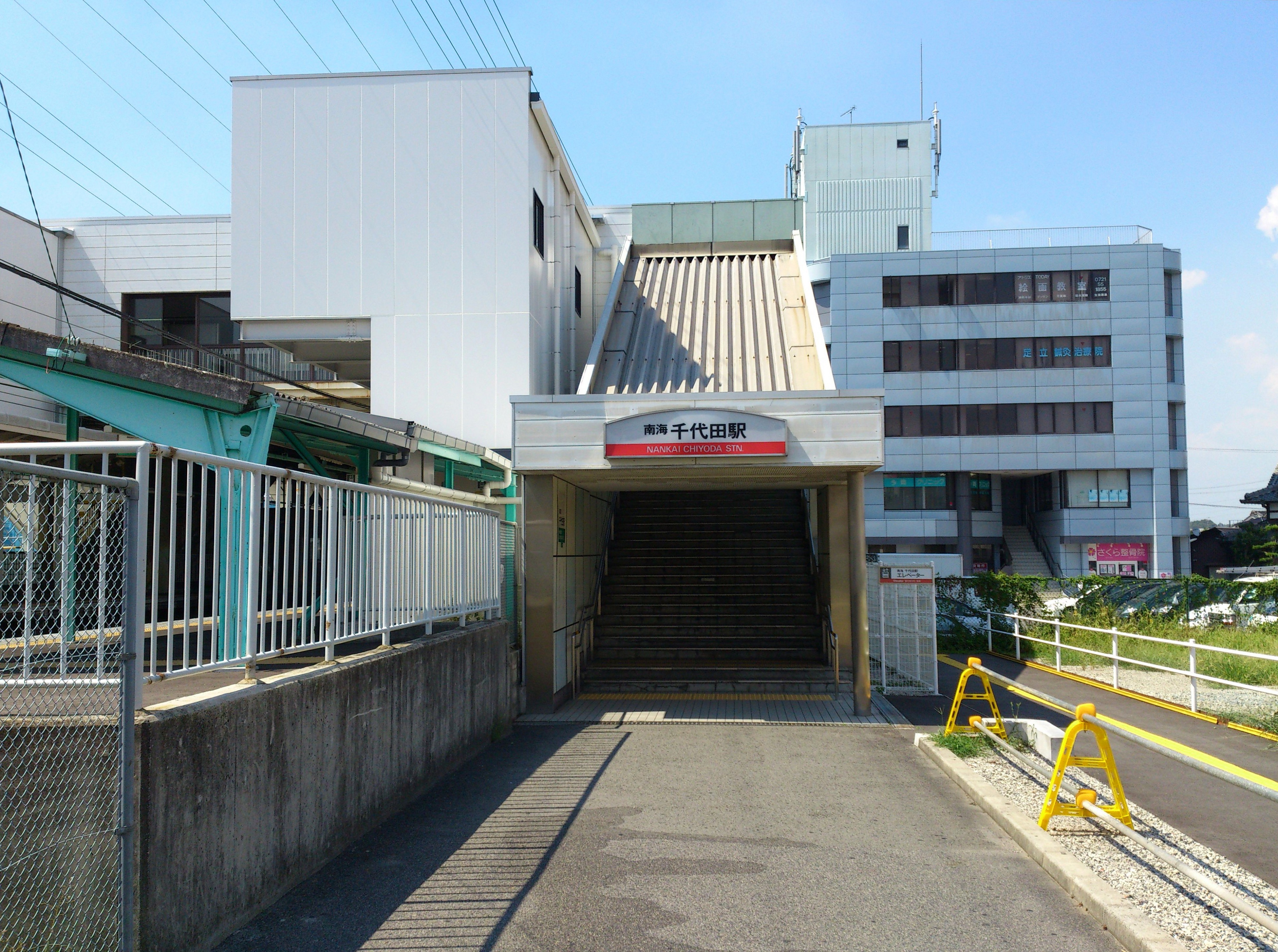
East exit

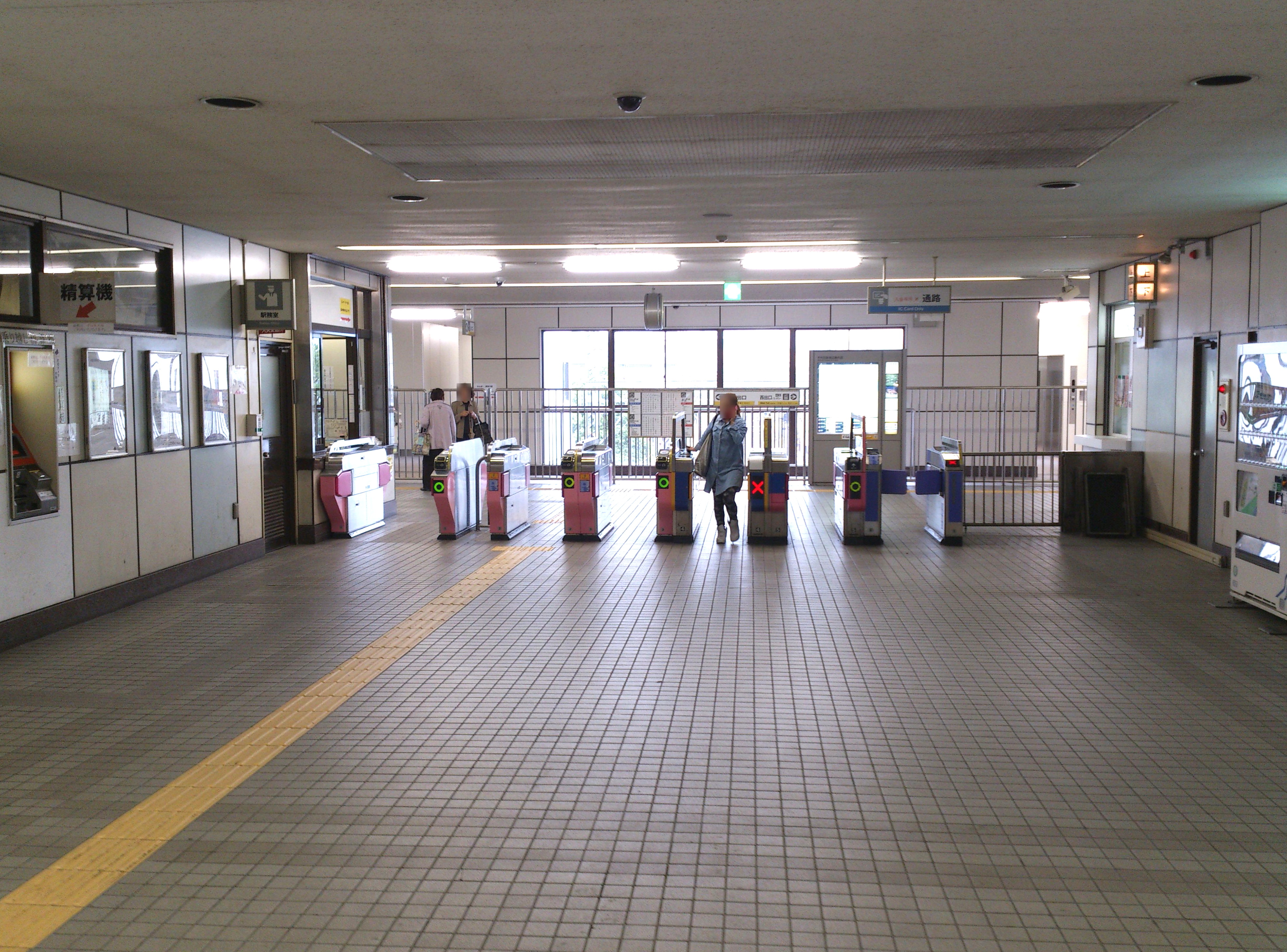
Ticket gates

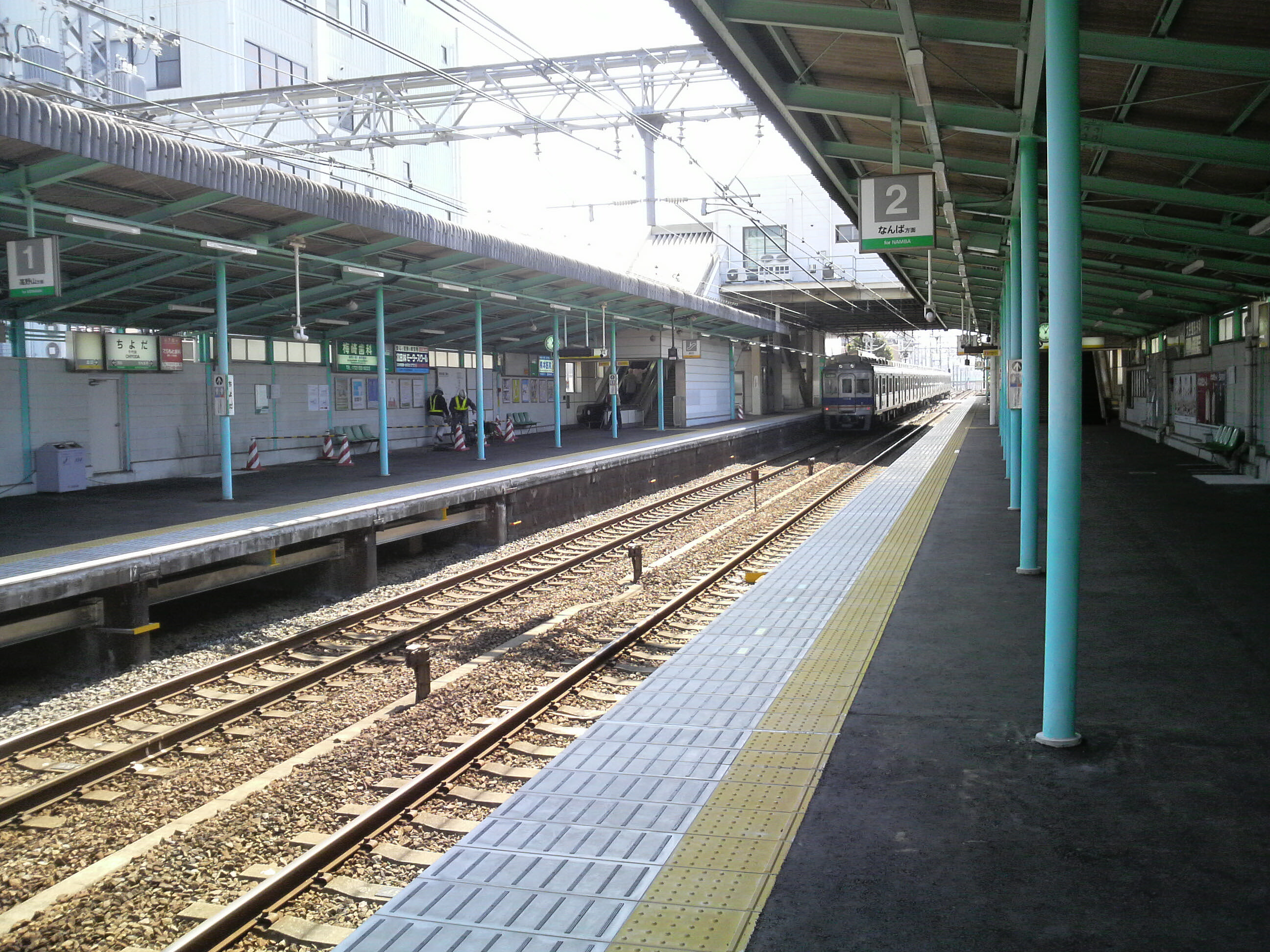
Platform

== History ==
Chiyoda Station opened on February 11, 1938.

== Passenger statistics ==
In fiscal 2019, the station was used by an average of 13,435 passengers daily.

== Surrounding area ==
- Teragaike
- Osaka Chiyoda Junior Colleges

== See also ==
- List of railway stations in Japan
