= Osaka Prefectural Flowers Garden =

Physic garden in Japan

Coordinates: 34°26′3.4″N 135°33′12.8″E

Osaka Prefectural Flower Garden
- 大阪府立花の文化園
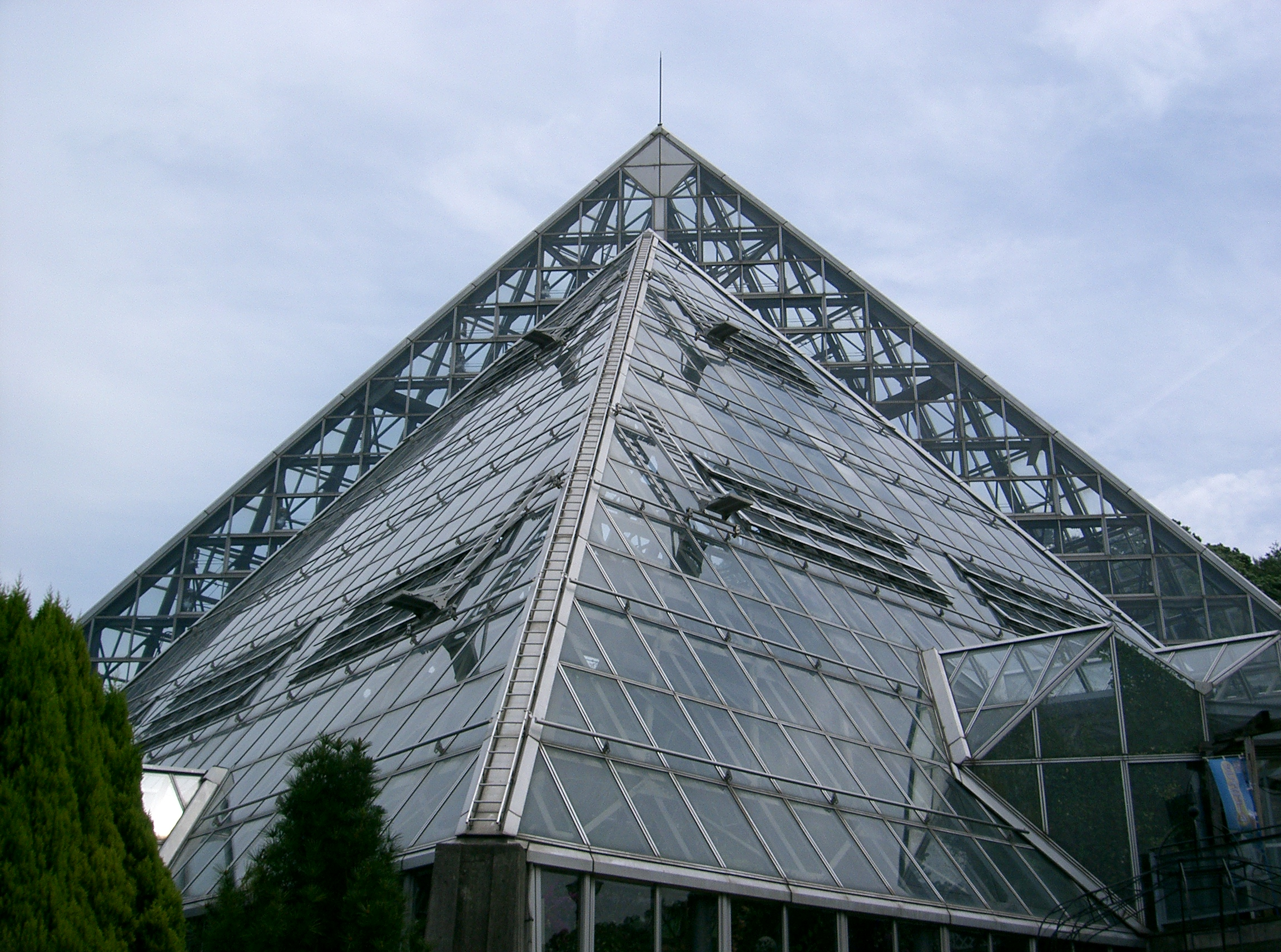
- Osaka Prefectural Flowers Garden
- Interactive map of Osaka Prefectural Flower Garden
- Opening: September 1990
- Website: hanabun-osaka.witc-pm.jp

Osaka Prefectural Flowers Garden (大阪府立花の文化園, Osaka-furitsu Hanano-bunkaen), also known as "Fululu Garden," is a botanical garden in Kawachinagano, Osaka Prefecture, Japan.

== History and Design ==
The garden was established on September, 1990, on a 10-hectare site previously used as a forestry testing ground. It inherited the concept of "a place to understand the relationship between flowers and people" and some exhibits from the International Garden and Greenery Exposition, which was held at Tsurumi Ryokuchi (Tsurumi Ward, Osaka City) for six months from April 1, 1990.

The garden is operated by the Osaka Prefectural Government based on the basic principles of "relaxing with flowers," "learning from flowers," and "interacting with flowers." The garden features a wide variety of flowers and plants from Japan and around the world, cultivated according to the season and viewable throughout the year. Notable features include an ornamental flowerbed in front of the entrance and a large greenhouse with a pyramid-shaped glass roof, indoor fountain, and cafe. The greenhouse houses tropical plants such as orchids and plants from arid regions like cacti.

== Facilities and events ==
In addition to the main garden and greenhouse, the Osaka Prefectural Flower Garden offers a range of facilities and events, including:

- Community Garden: Designed by Kazuyuki Ishihara.
- Wooden observation deck: Offers a panoramic view of the decorative flowerbed.
- Event Hall: Used for horticultural exhibitions and other events.
- Library: Houses books and magazines on flowers and plants.
- Restaurant and Garden Shop: Sells gardening materials and other goods.
- Flower Workshop: Equipped for crafts, gardening, and cooking.
- Event Plaza and Lawn: Used for various events.
- Plum Garden: Features approximately 300 plum trees.
- Rose Garden: Showcases a variety of roses.

== Unique initiatives ==
The Osaka Prefectural Flower Garden has implemented several unique initiatives, including:

- Cosplay Day: Once a month, the garden designates a "Cosplay Day" where cosplayers can use the changing rooms for free and take photos and videos in the garden under certain conditions.
- Pet-friendly days: Allows visitors to bring their pet dogs and cats into the garden on designated days.
- Nighttime Openings: The garden occasionally opens at night during peak cherry blossom and autumn foliage seasons, offering free admission to limited areas.
- Illumination Events: The garden has hosted illumination events in the past, such as "Okukawachi Illumi-Night" and "Hanabun Thanks Illumi."

== Outlines ==
- Address: 2292-1 Takō Kawachinagano, Osaka, Japan 586-0092
- Phone number: 0721-63-8739
