= Takidani Station =

Railway station in Tondabayashi, Osaka Prefecture, Japan

Takidani Station 滝谷駅
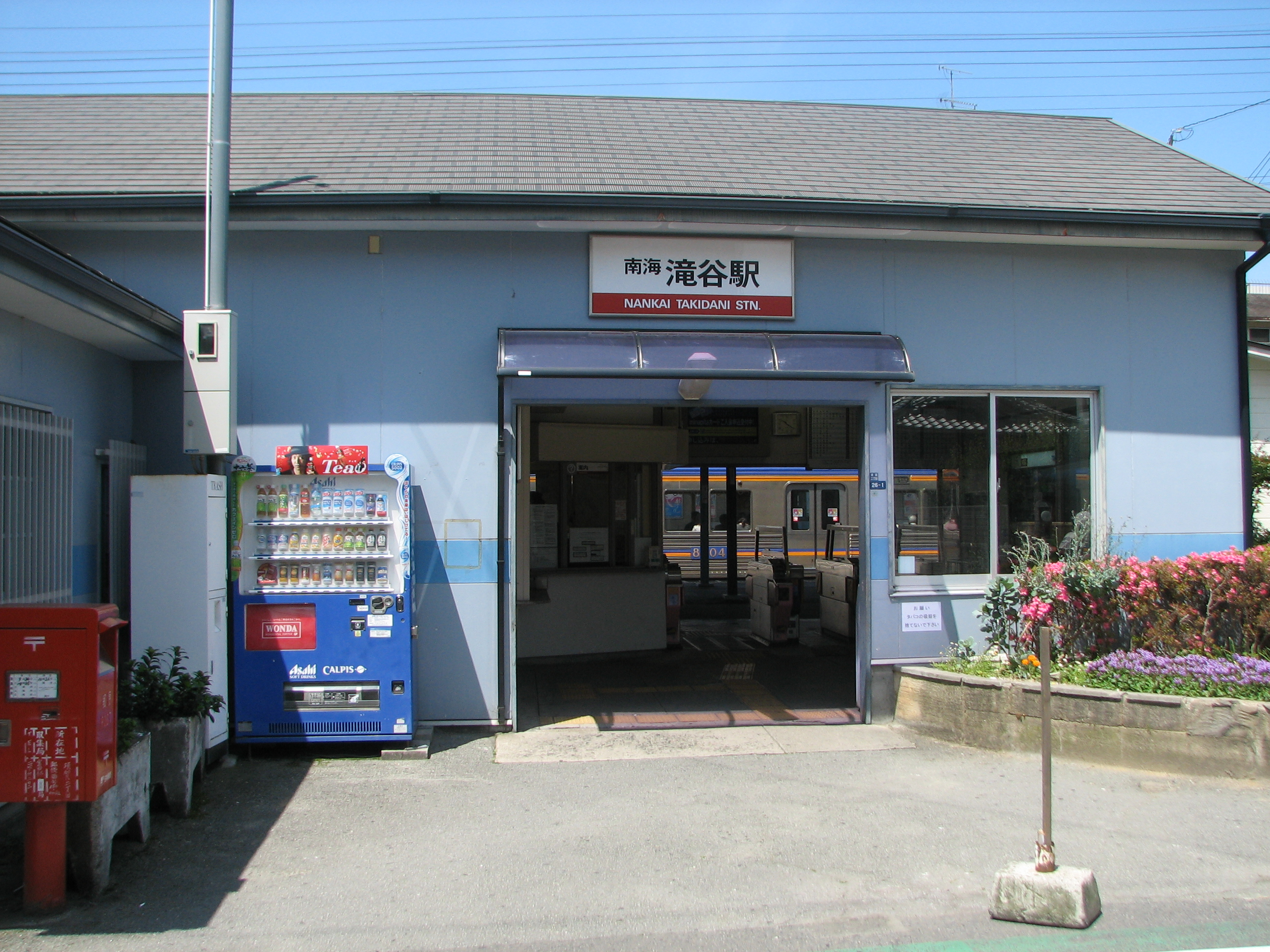
- Takidani Station, May 2010

General information
- Location: 2-26-1, Suga, Tondabayashi-shi, Osaka-fu 584-0062; Japan
- Coordinates: 34°28′45.1″N 135°33′44.6″E
- Operator: Nankai Electric Railway
- Line: Nankai Kōya Line
- Distance: 24.6 km (15.3 miles) from Shiomibashi
- Platforms: 2 side platforms
- Connections

Other information
- Status: Unstaffed
- Station code: NK67
- Website: Official website

History
- Opened: 29 March 1898

Passengers
- FY2019: 5292 daily

Services
Preceding station	Nankai Electric Railway	Following station
Kongō towards Namba	Kōya Line Local Sub. Express	Chiyoda towards Gokurakubashi
Kongō towards Namba	Kōya Line Semi-Express	Chiyoda One-way operation
Location
- Location within Osaka Prefecture Location within Japan

Takidani Station (滝谷駅, Takidani-eki) is a passenger railway station in the city of Tondabayashi, Osaka Prefecture, Japan. The station is operated by the private railway company Nankai Electric Railway.

== Lines ==
Takidani Station is served by the Nankai Kōya Line, and is located 24.6 kilometers from the terminus of the line at Shiomibashi Station and 23.9 kilometers from Namba Station.

== Station layout ==
The station consists of two opposed side platforms connected to the station building by a footbridge. The station is unattended.

=== Platforms ===
1	■ Koya Line (southbound)	for Kōyasan
2	■ Koya Line (northbound)	for Namba

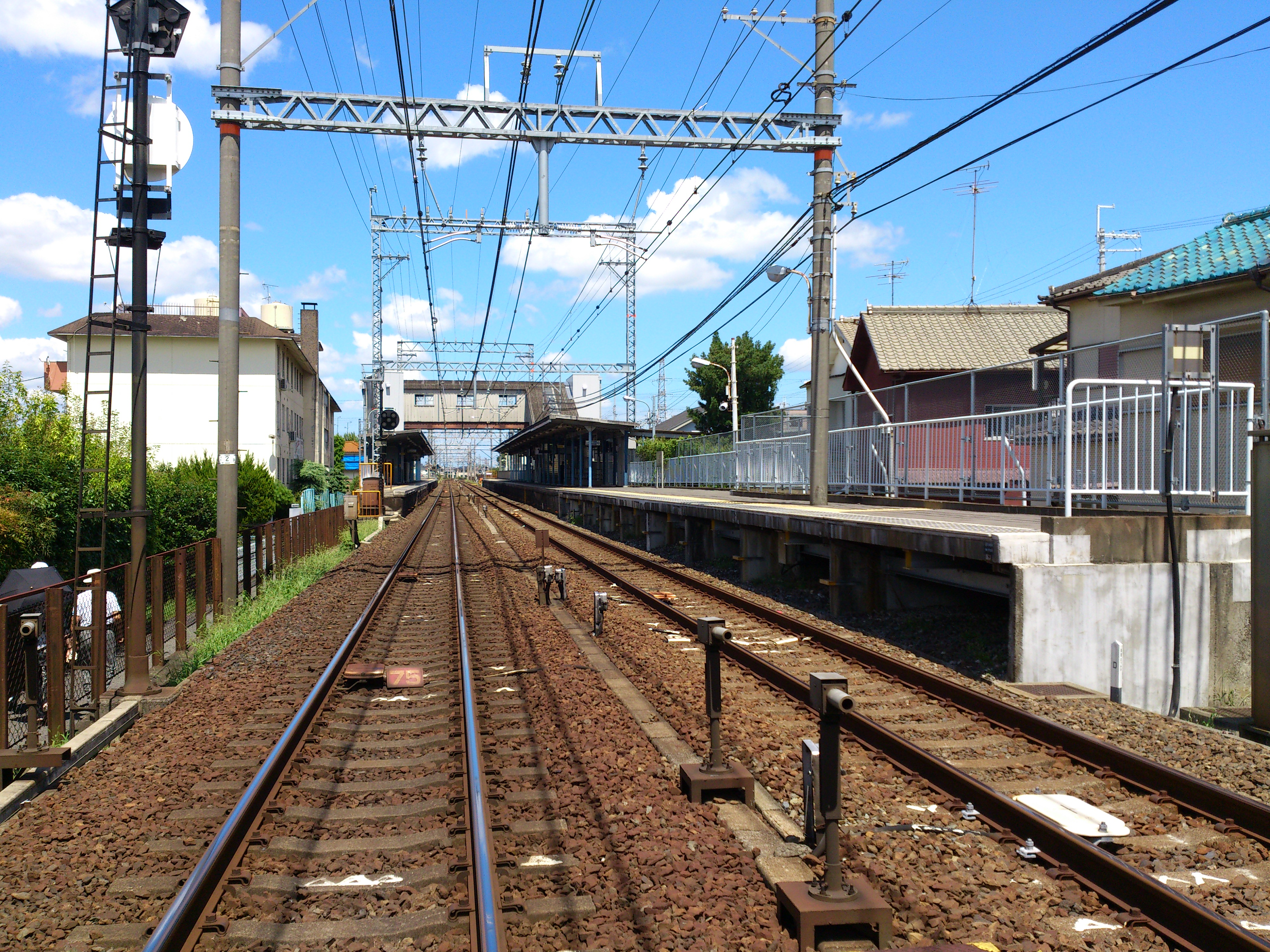
Platform

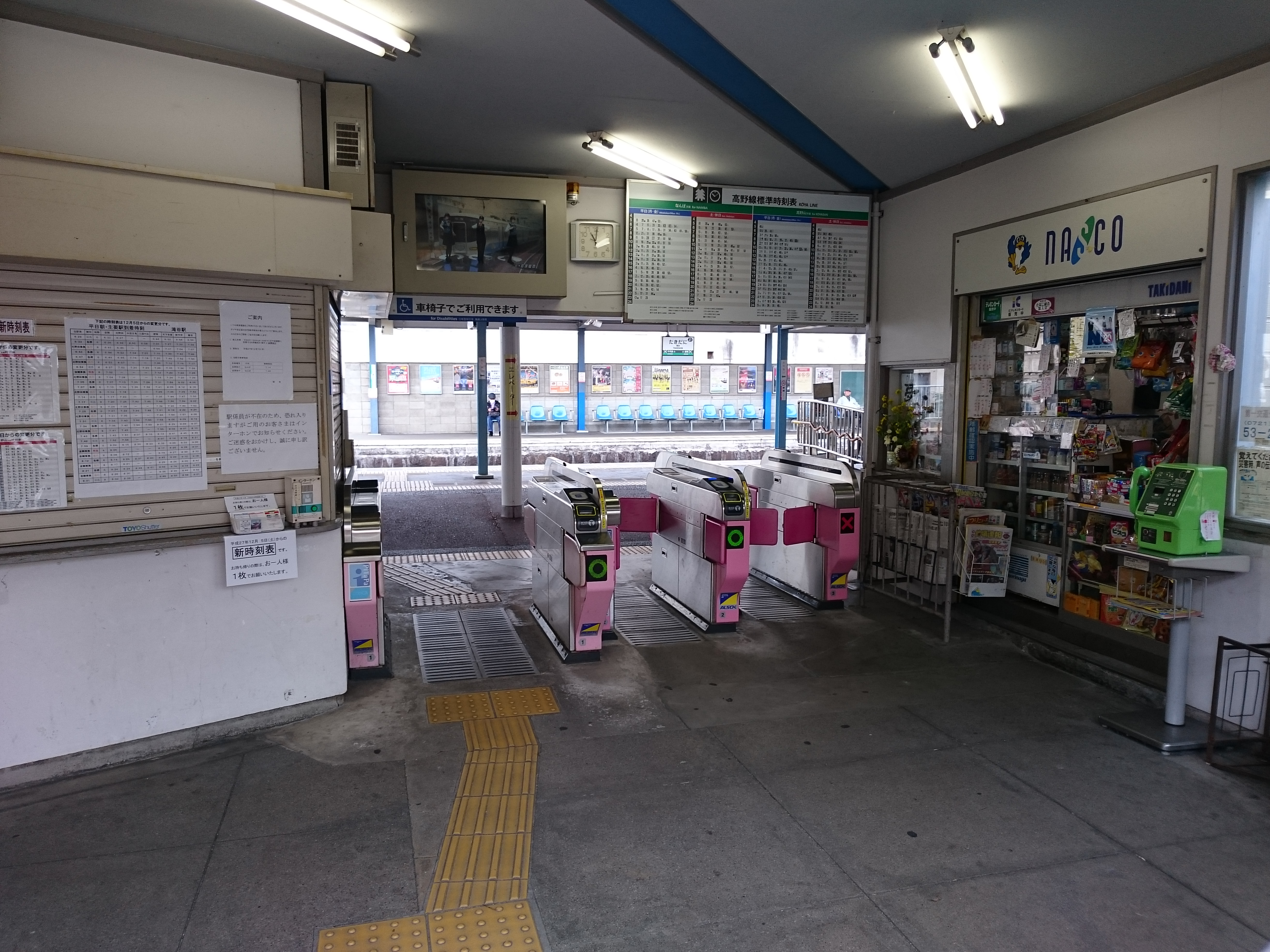
Ticket gates

== History ==
Takidani Station opened on March 29,1898. In 1944, by order of the Japanese government, the Nankai Railway was merged with the Kintetsu Group to form the Nankai Railway Company in 1947.

== Passenger statistics ==
In fiscal 2019, the station was used by an average of 5292 passengers daily

== Surrounding area ==
- Kawachinagano Matsugaoka Post Office

== See also ==
- List of railway stations in Japan
