= Hikaru Koyama =

Japanese fashion model and singer (born 1991)

Hikaru Koyama 小山 ひかる
- Born: 28 June 1991 (age 35); Kyoto Prefecture, Japan
- Genres: J-pop
- Occupations: Fashion model; singer
- Years active: 2002–

Hikaru Koyama (小山 ひかる, Koyama Hikaru; born 28 June 1991) is a Japanese fashion model and singer. She was born from Kyoto Prefecture. She is represented with IMS Entertainment.

She is a former member of Vision Factory's girls' quartet dance and vocal unit Hinoi Team.

== Biography ==
- On 3 July 2002, she formed the three person music unit Love&Peace with Miho Hiroshige and Asuka Hinoi, and released the single "Drifter" (PCCA-1699).
- On 18 May 2005, she released the single "Ike Ike" as a member of Hinoi Team.
- From 1 September 2008, her diary "Hikaru wa Eien Tsuru wa Sen Nen Kame wa Man Nen" was deleted from her affiliated office's mobile website.
- On 3 June 2012, she was selected as the first student of the Kansai Collection
- She appeared on 17 September 2012 at the Kansai Collection 2012 A/W (4th, Kyocera Dome Osaka).
- On 3 March 2013, she appeared in Kansai Collection 2013 S/S (5th, Kyocera Dome Osaka) Nails Unique stage.
- She appeared as guest model on Tokyo Fashion Collection (Pacifico Yokohama) on 12 July 2014.

== Filmography ==
=== Films ===
- Kūga no Shiro: Joshi Keimusho (published 26 Mar 2017, Director: Wataru Oku) – as Yuki Ninomiya

=== Direct-to-video ===
- Kūga no Shiro: Joshi Keimusho 2 (May 2017, Director: Wataru Oku) – as Yuki Ninomiya

== Bibliography ==
- Love Berry (– Mar 2008 issue) Tokuma Shoten
- 3-Kagetsu Mae kara Hajimeru Beauty Hanayome Book, Gentosha – image model
