= Flower Festival: Vision Factory Presents =

- CD

Compilation album by Various Artists
- Released: March 19, 2008
- Genre: Pop, J-pop
- Length: 51:44
- Language: Japanese
- Label: Sonic Groove

Various Artists chronology
Spring Harmony: Vision Factory Presents (2008)	Flower Festival: Vision Factory Presents (2008)

"Flower Festival: Vision Factory Presents" (stylized as FLOWER FESTIVAL ～VISION FACTORY presents～) is a Vision Factory artists compilation album with a spring theme. The CD has warm pieces of music by artists who have matched their songs to the theme, the season of flowers. It was released on March 19, 2008 in CD format only.

== Track listing ==
CD
No.	Title	Original Artist(s)	Length
1.	"Sakura" (サクラ)	Hiro	5:22
2.	"Special Story"	Daichi Miura	4:14
3.	"365-Nichi no Hana Kotoba" (365日の花言葉 / 365 Days in the Language of Flowers)	Fungo	4:42
4.	"Dahlia of Love" (愛のダリア / Ai no Daria)	Minoru Komorita	4:11
5.	"White Velvet"	Maryjun Takahashi	4:21
6.	"Hyacinth" (ヒヤシンス / Hiyashinsu)	Ota Motohiro & Sato Rasuta	4:00
7.	"Matsuyuki ~Sundrop~" (松雪草～スノードロップ～ / Snow and Grass ~Sundrop~)	Ota Crew	4:44
8.	"Bleeding Heart"	Olivia Lufkin	4:28
9.	"Suirin"" (Water Lily)	Asuka Hinoi	5:13
10.	"Himawari" (向日葵 / Sunflower)	Rina Chinen with Vanilla Mood	5:03
11.	"Dear My Flower"	Lead	5:26
