= Tatta Hitori no Kimi =

Single by Asuka Hinoi
- Released: April 14, 2004 (JP)
- Recorded: 2004
- Genre: J-pop
- Label: Sonic Groove
- Songwriter(s): Hiromasa Ijichi
- Producer(s): Hiromasa Ijichi

Asuka Hinoi singles chronology
"Wanna Be Your Girlfriend" (2003)	"Tatta Hitori no Kimi" (2004)	"Asu e no Hikari" (2007)

"Tatta Hitori no Kimi" (たったひとりの君; You as Only One Person) is the second single by Asuka Hinoi. It was released on April 14, 2004, and reached number 79 on the Oricon charts. It was written by the songwriter Hiromasa Ijichi.

== Track listing ==
1. "Tatta Hitori no Kimi"
2. "Rock-n-Roll Army"
3. "Tatta Hitori no Kimi" (instrumental)
4. "Rock-n-Roll Army" (instrumental)
