= Hinoi Team =

Pop band from Japan

- Origin: Osaka, Kobe and Kyoto, Japan
- Genres: Pop; J-pop; Eurobeat
- Years active: 2005–2007
- Labels: Avex Trax
- Past members: Asuka Hinoi; Keika Matsuoka; Hikaru Koyama; Rina Takenaka
- Website: Official website

Hinoi Team (Hinoi チーム, Hinoi Chīmu) was a Japanese female pop group formed around Asuka Hinoi with supporting members Keika Matsuoka, Hikaru Koyama, and Rina Takenaka. Most of their releases are covers of Eurobeat songs.

== Discography ==
=== Ike Ike ===
The Hinoi team's debut "Ike Ike" (meaning "Go, Go") went on sale on May 18, 2005, in Japan. The song was written by Italian producers Claudio Accatino, Federico Rimonti and Roberto Festari, and originally performed by Tri-Star, but the Hinoi team's version had new (Japanese) lyrics written by Kenko-P. Its rhythms were derived from the song "We Like to Party" by the Dutch Eurodance pop group Vengaboys. The Hinoi Team single also features the song "Sing Na Na Na" as well as an extended version of "Ike Ike" and instrumental versions for both songs. The DVD has a promotional video, a Para Para video and video out-takes. Hinoi Team's "Ike Ike" was also used as the closing theme for the anime Ichigo 100% and for the Chukyo TV show Sarudie during the month of April.

=== King Kong ===
Hinoi Team's second single went on sale on July 27, 2005. The single was packaged with the song "Super Euro Flash" as well as a New Generation remix of "Ike Ike" and a Eurobeat version of "King Kong," as well as a TV remix of both "King Kong" and "Super Euro Flash." The DVD has a promotional video, Para Para video for "King Kong," a Koriki version of "Ike Ike" and out-takes.

=== Night of Fire/Play with the Numbers ===
The group's third single featured Japanese wrestler and comedian Korikki Chōshū and went on sale on December 14, 2005. The single also featured the song "Yeah!", "Korikki maji" & "Hinoi Team" versions of "Night of Fire" by Niko and instrumental versions of all three songs. The DVD version has a promotional video for "Night of Fire", Para Para versions of "Night of Fire" and "Play with the Numbers" and out-takes.

=== Sticky Tricky and Bang ===
Hinoi Team's fourth single included Koriki again and was released on March 8, 2006. The single features the title song ("Sticky Tricky and Bang"), "On My Own" (a special version which is a preview of the album version coming the next week), a remix of "Night of Fire," an alternate version of "Sticky Tricky and Bang," and instrumentals.

=== Super Euro Party ===
Hinoi Team's first full-length album was released on March 15, 2006, a week after the release of their single "Sticky Tricky and Bang." The album features all of the group's non-instrumental tracks from their singles excluding Hinoi Team versions and Korikki versions. The album also features six new songs and a megamix (only first press version of album). The DVD offered with the CD+DVD version packaged together all of the material from DVDs that originally came with each single.

=== Now and Forever ===
Released on August 9, 2006, Hinoi Team's fifth single offered another round of covers of Eurobeat songs. As with the others, the single can be purchased with or without the DVD.

=== Dancin' & Dreamin' ===
The group's sixth single was released on February 7, 2007. A trance remix of the title song is only available on the CD-only version of the single.
