= Teragaike =

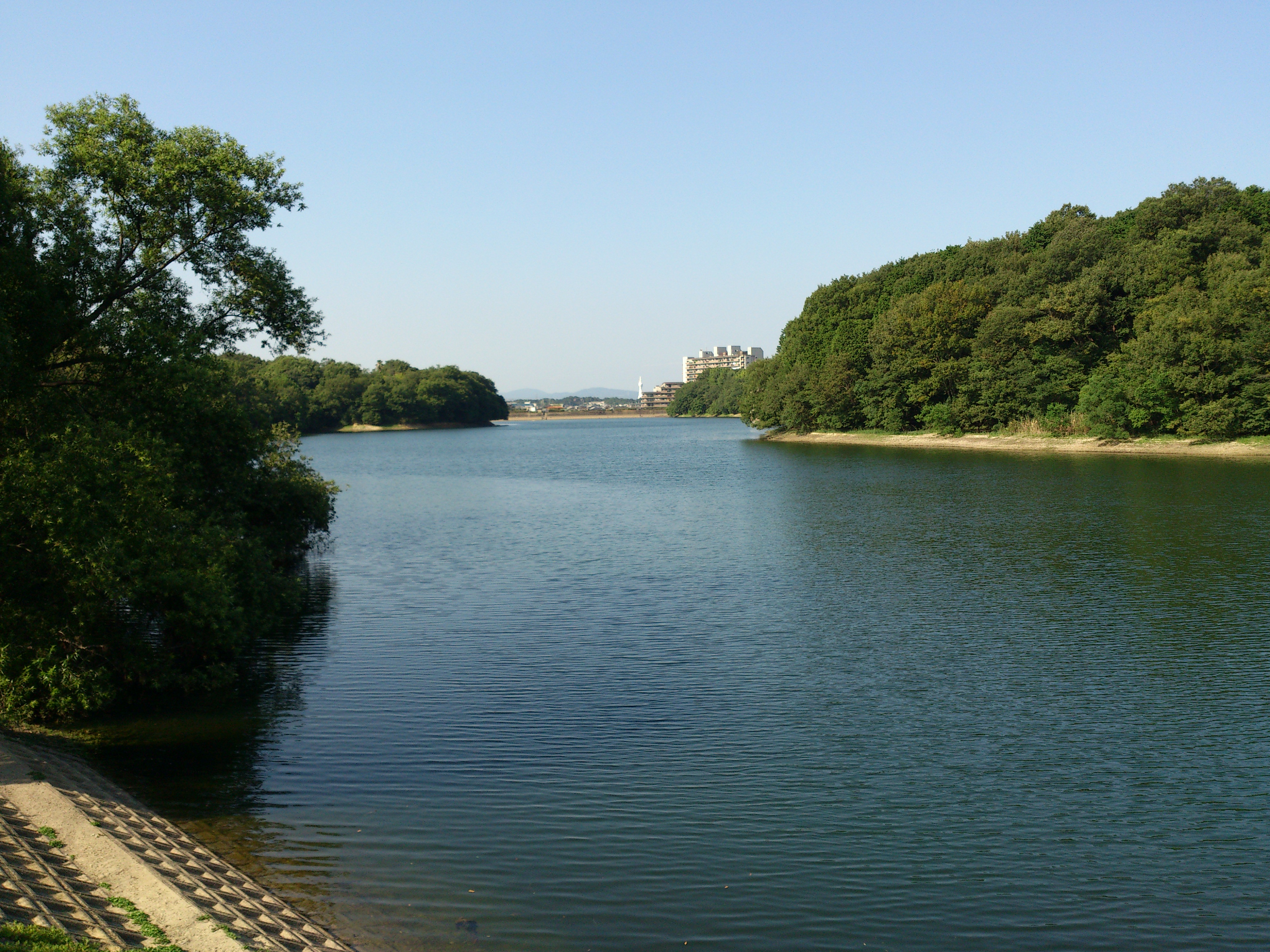
- View from sorth bank

- Location within Japan
- Official name: 寺ヶ池
- Country: Japan
- Location: Kawachinagano, Osaka
- Coordinates: 34°27′48.4″N 135°33′31.3″E
- Status: Operational
- Opening date: 1649

Dam and spillways
- Type of dam: Earth-fill dam
- Impounds: Ishi River
- Height: 15 m (49 ft)
- Length: 147.2 m (483 ft)
- Dam volume: 71,000 m^{3}

Reservoir
- Total capacity: 600,000 m^{3}
- Catchment area: 0.5 km^{2}
- Surface area: 18 ha

Teragaike (寺ヶ池) is a reservoir in Kawachinagano, Osaka Prefecture, Japan. It is for irrigation to paddy fields near this lake. It was made in the Edo period. Fishing is prohibited in the lake.

== Summaries ==
- Teragaike lies to the north of Kawachinagano, Osaka Prefecture, Japan. About 15 minutes walk from Chiyoda Station on Nankai Kōya Line.
- Surrounding the lake is maintained esplanade, and people of the neighborhood utilize it for a stroll.

North bank

- There are steles, a sluice of aqueducts for irrigation, a plaza, and playground equipment for training.
- There are residential areas around the lake.
- People can watch PL Art of Fireworks every year on August 1.
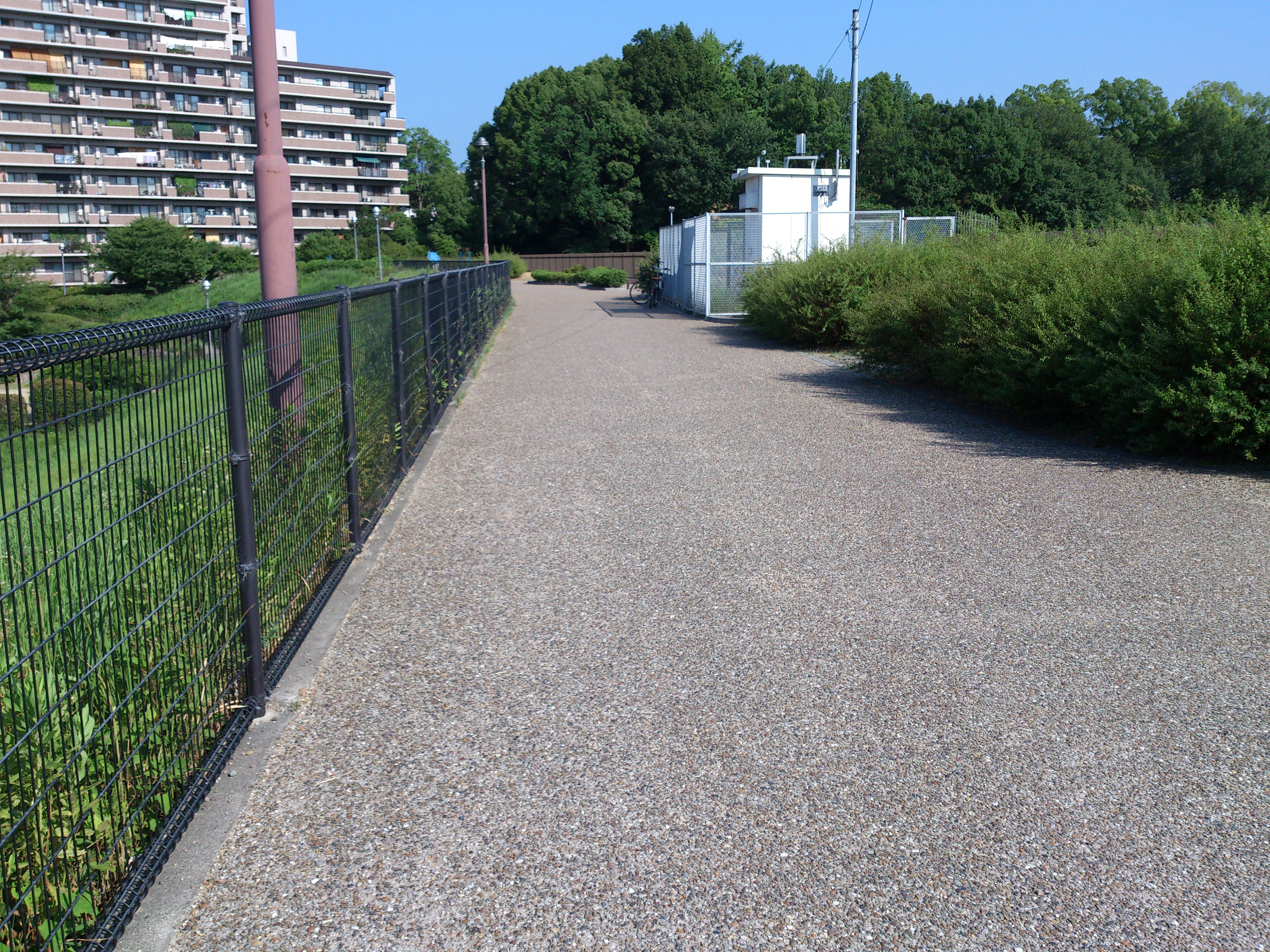
Esplanade

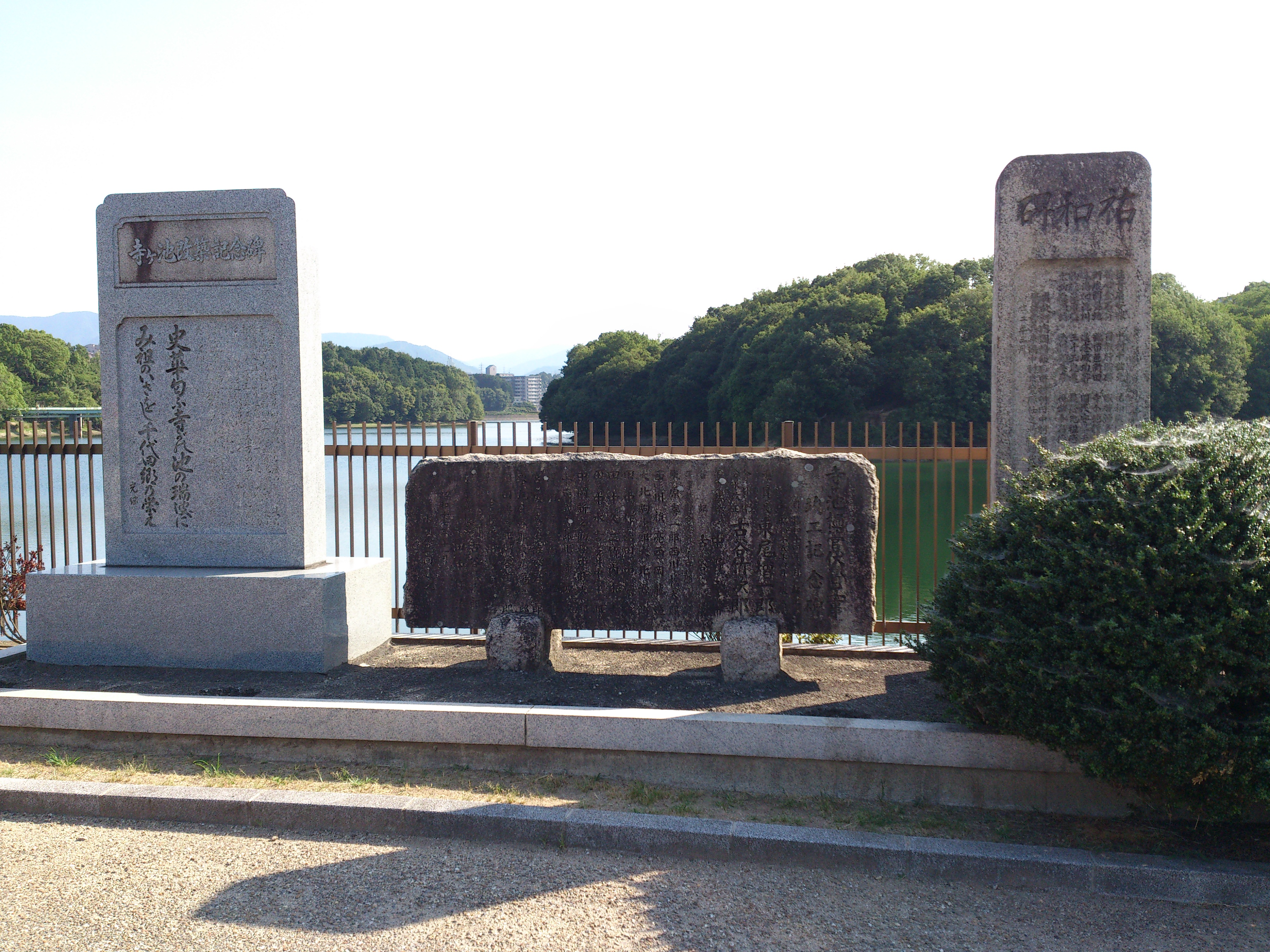
Steles

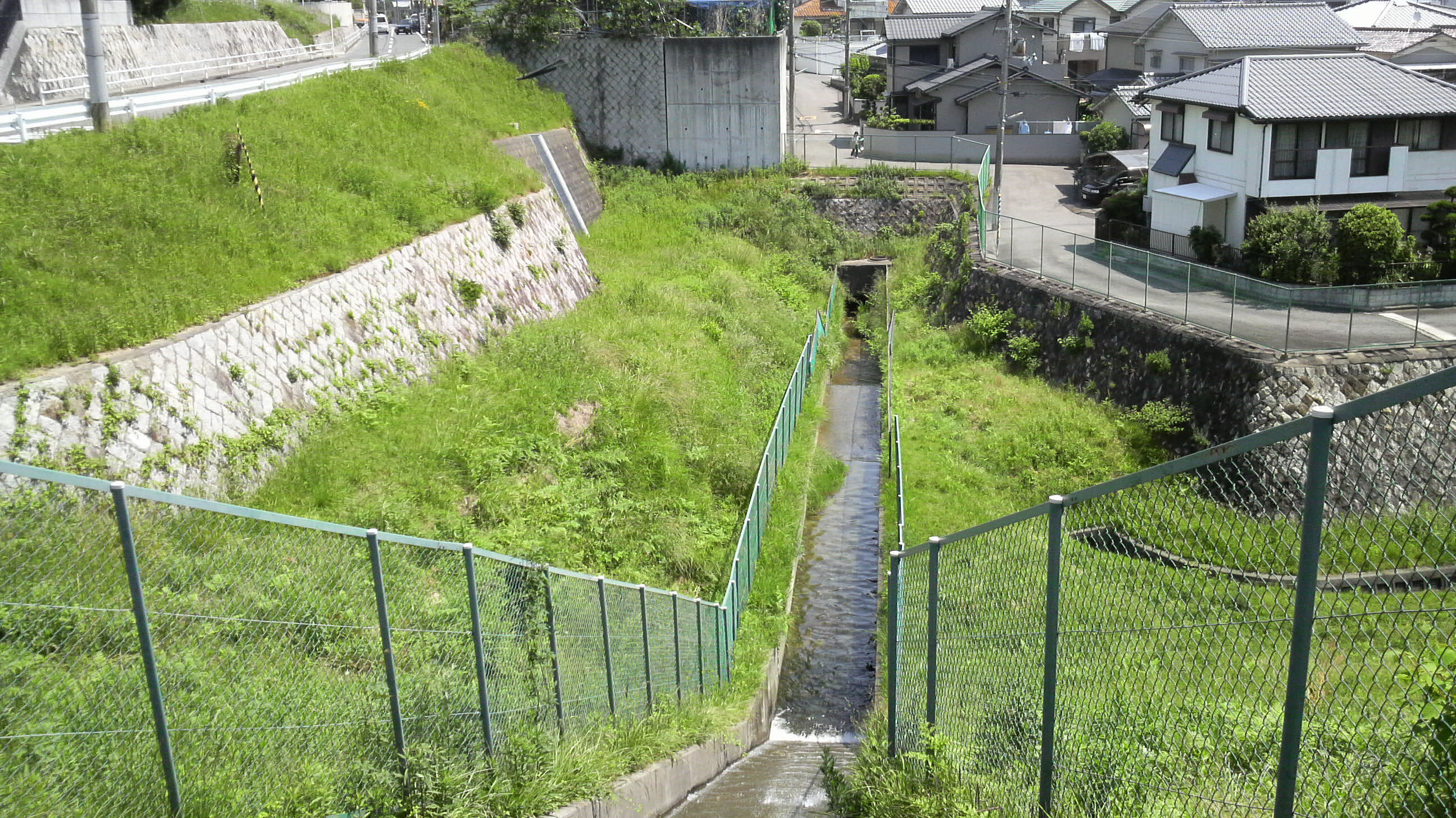
Aqueducts

South bank

- There are houses and fields around this area.
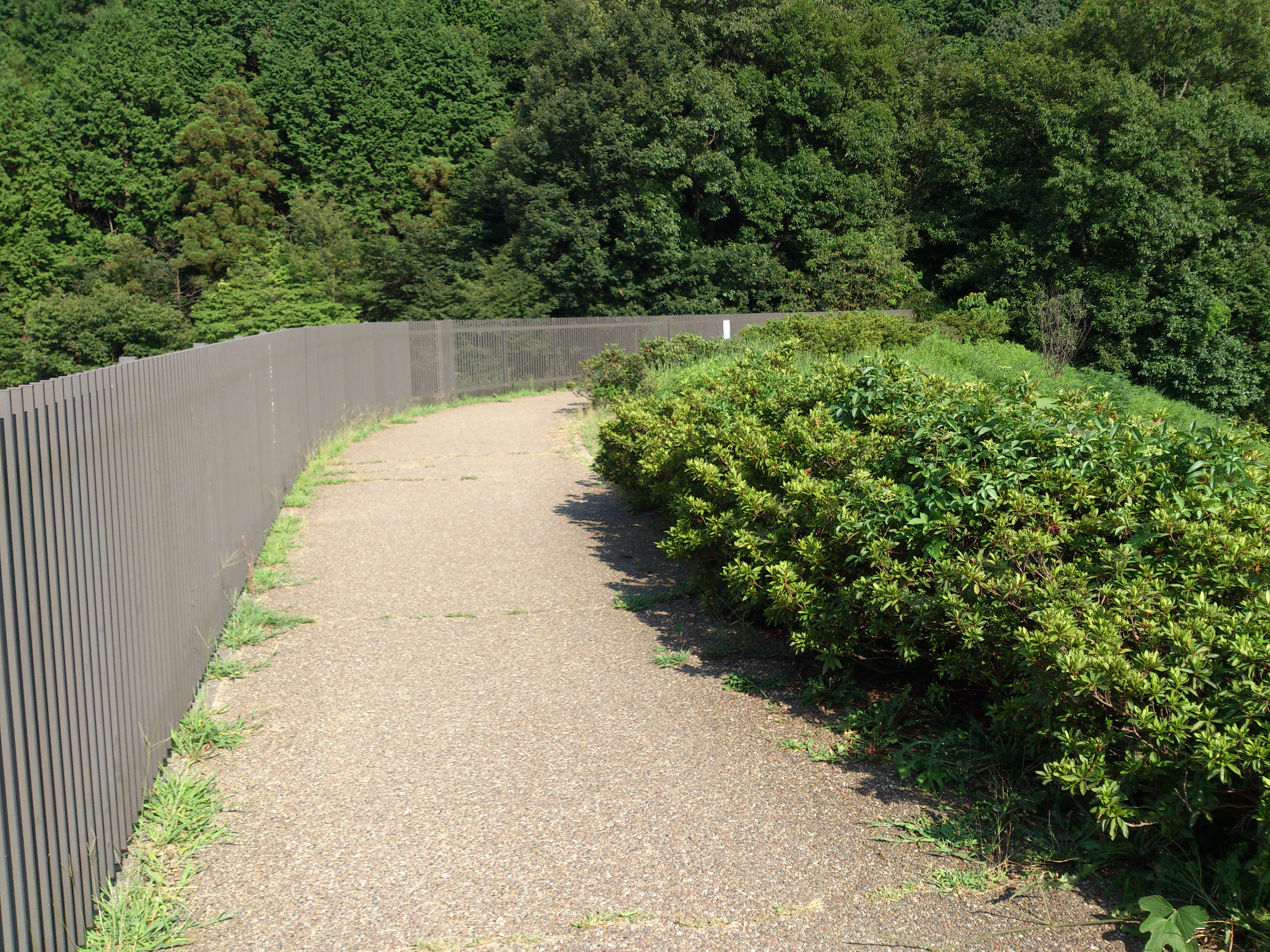
Esplanade

Teragaike Park

- There are fountains and Plaza Of The Four Seasons (四季の広場, Shiki-no-hiroba) as the main area on the south side of the lake.
- There are tennis courts, a small baseball park, a gateball court, and a civic swimming pool on the east side.
- There is Fukujin Benzaiten Teragaike Chinju (福神弁財天寺ヶ池鎮守) in Bentensan Plaza on the west side.
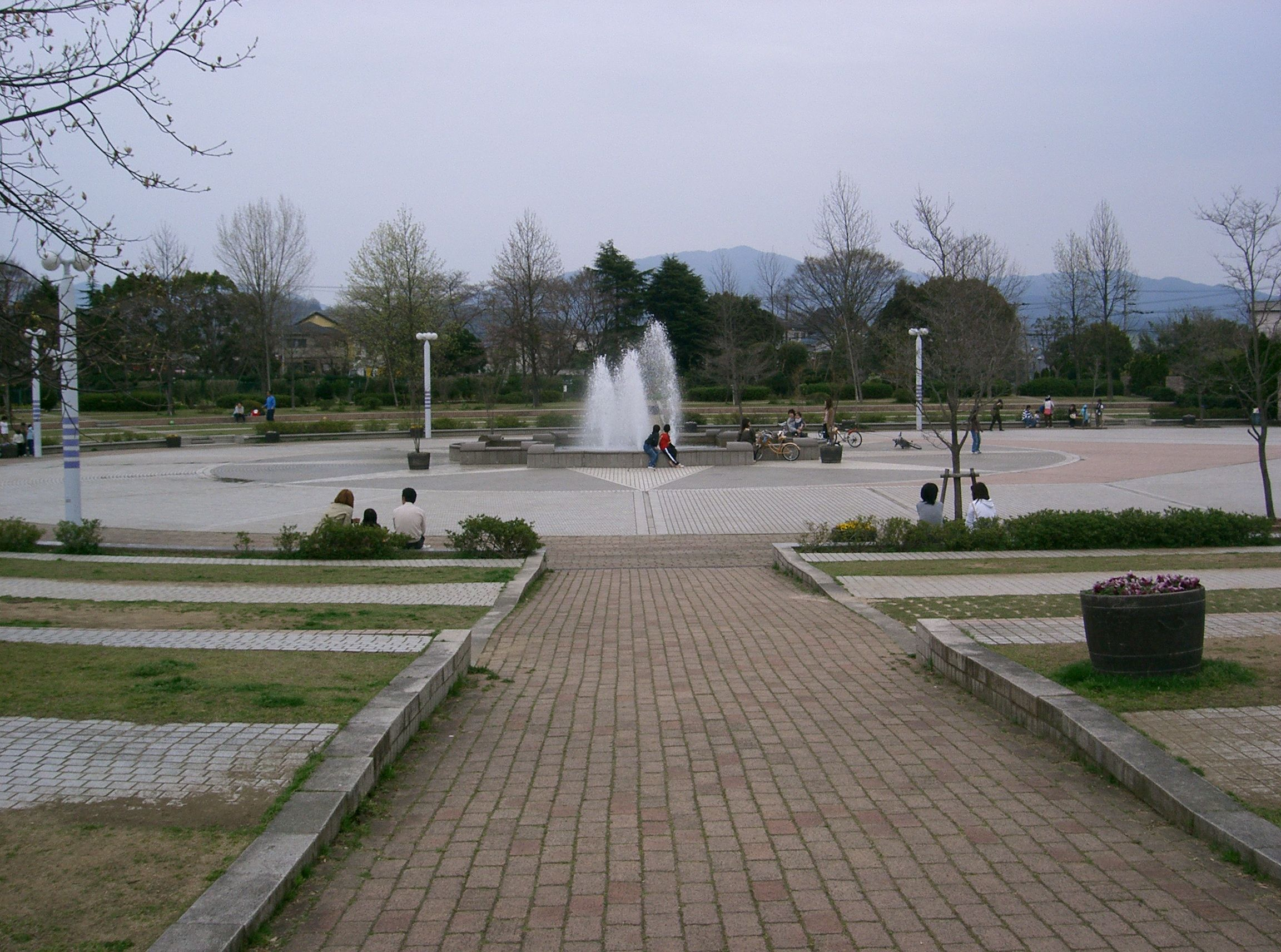
Plaza Of The Four Seasons

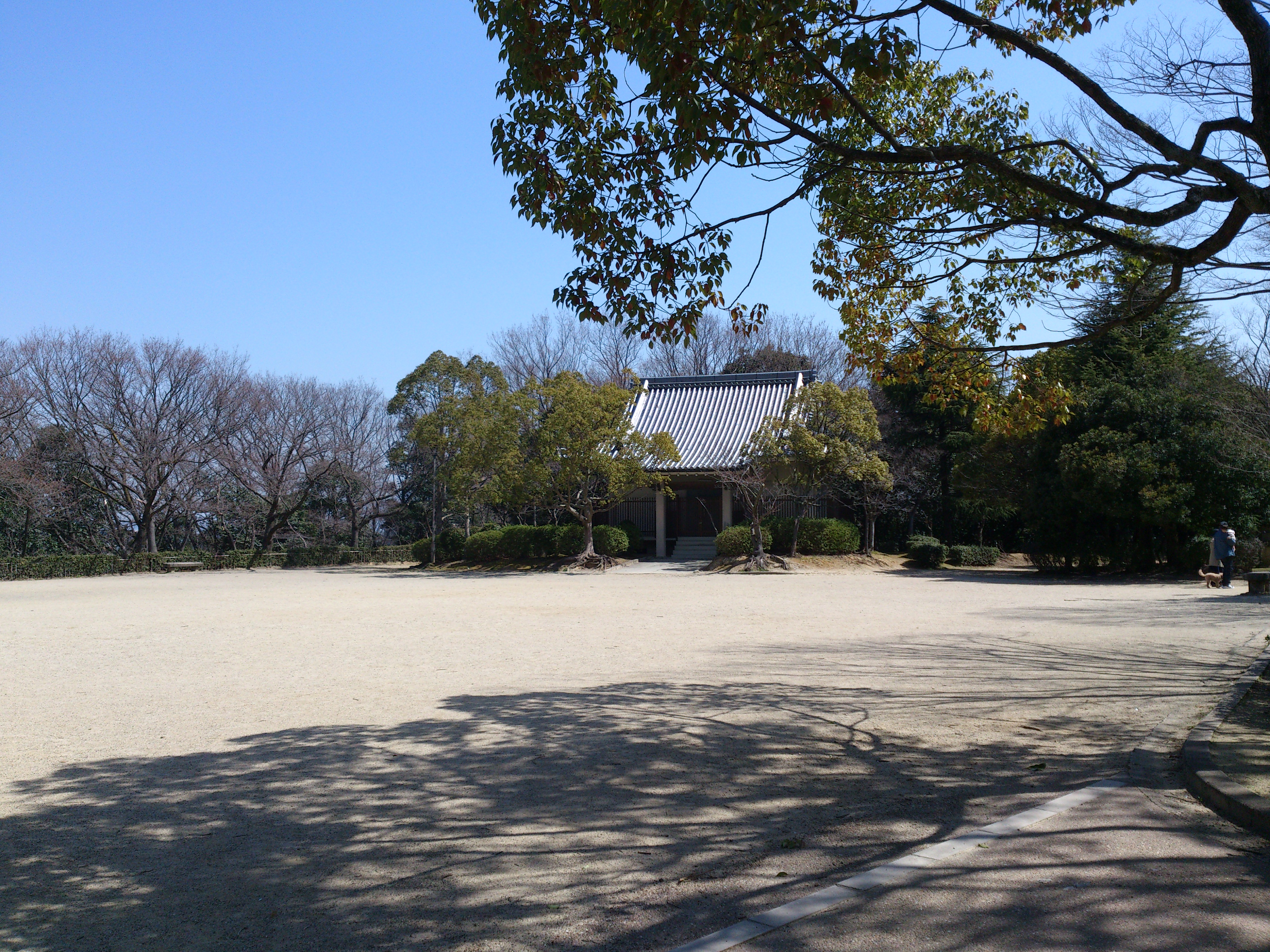
Bentensan Plaza

== History ==
- 1649:Yojibe Nakamura (中村與次兵衛, Nakamura Yojibei) played a key role, and originally they expanded the small pond which there was, and, for newly reclaiming a rice field, it was made. A total of about 40,000 was mobilized.
- 1969:Finished renovation

== See also ==
- List of dams and reservoirs
