= Osaka Chiyoda Junior College =

Coordinates: 34°26′44″N 135°32′56″E

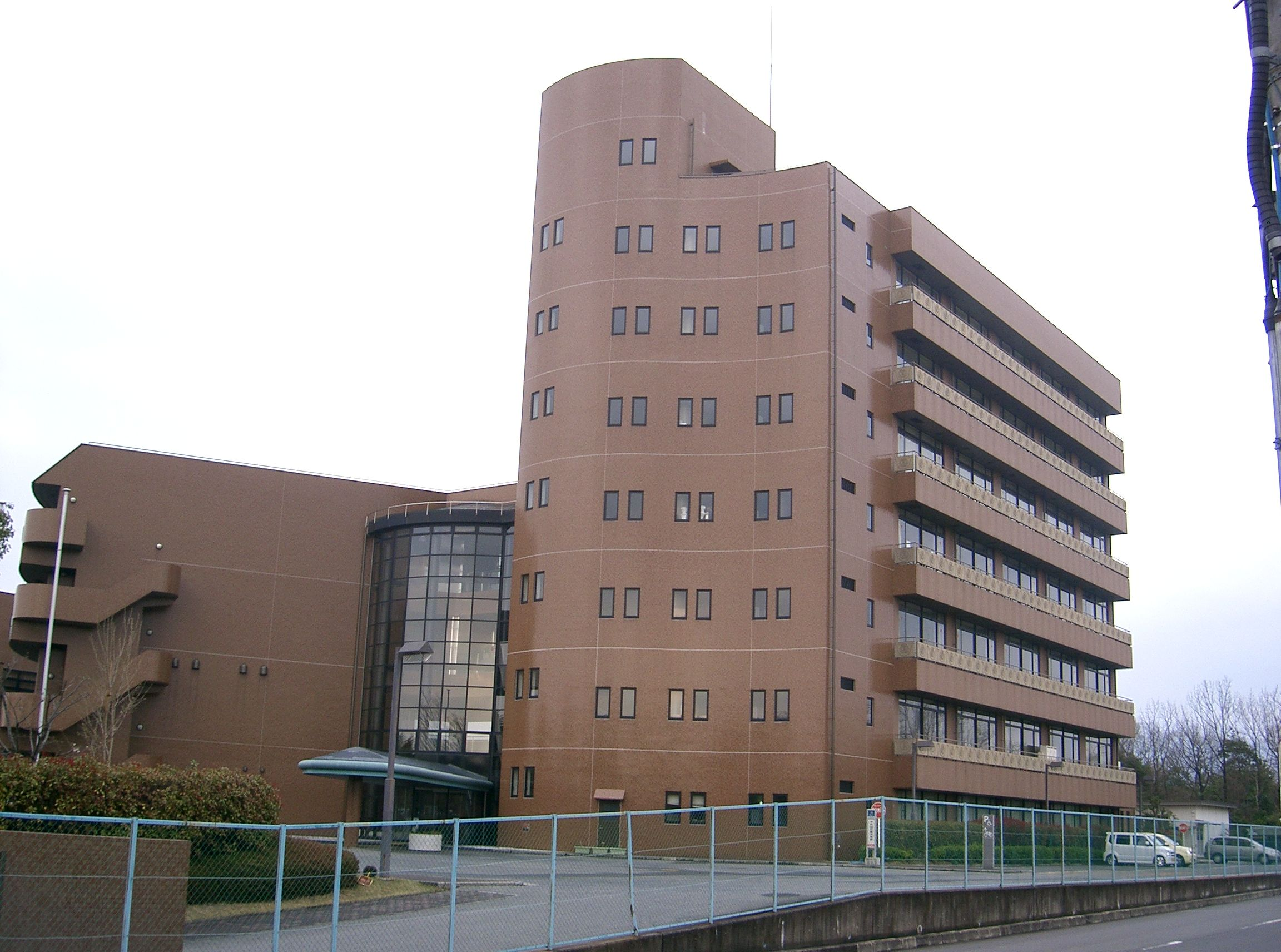
Osaka Chiyoda Junior College

Osaka Chiyoda Junior College (大阪千代田短期大学, Ōsaka chiyoda tanki daigaku) is a private junior college in Kawachinagano, Osaka, Japan. It was established in 1965 and adopted the present name in the following year.

== Alumni ==
- Misaki Ito, actress
