= Asuka Hinoi =

Japanese singer and actress (born 1991)

Asuka Hinoi 樋井明日香
- Born: January 8, 1991 (age 34)
- Occupation(s): Singer, actress
- Musical career
- Genres: J-pop
- Years active: 2002–present
- Labels: Sonic Groove; avex trax; Pony Canyon
- Website: Asuka Hinoi Official Website, Hinoi Team Official Website

Asuka Hinoi (樋井 明日香, Hinoi Asuka, born January 8, 1991) is a Japanese singer and actress.

== Biography ==
Asuka's musical career began in 2002, when she was chosen with two other girls, Hikaru Koyama and Miho Hiroshige, to form the group LOVE & PEACE. Their song "Drifter" became the theme for the movie Dodge Go! Go! and the trio had minor roles in the movie. LOVE & PEACE, however, only that single was released.

In 2003, Asuka and Hikaru, along with Yuho Fujiwara, attempted to create a group again under Vision Factory's management. The girls were models for mezzopiano and nicola, but their debut never occurred.

Later in 2003, Tomoko Kawase, better known as Tommy, had seen potential in Asuka and had produced her first solo single, "♥Wanna be your girlfriend♥", under the Sonic Groove label, a sub-label of avex trax. The song was used as the ending theme for the drama Ashita Tenki ni Naare. The single only made it to position 60 on the Oricon charts but did give Asuka much needed exposure. Five months later, her second single Tatta Hitori no Kimi (たったひとりの君, You as Only One Person), was written by the songwriter behind Speed, Hiromasa Ijichi. Her second single gave her much more exposure as she performed on musical shows like Music Station, Pop Jam, and HEY!HEY!HEY!. This single did not do as well as her first on the charts, as it only reached position number 79 on the Oricon charts.

On December 4, 2004, it was announced that Asuka would be leader of a group called Hinoi Team. Auditions had been held at the dance and vocal school Caless, where Asuka and Hikaru had previously studied singing and dance. Originally, the other members consisted of Hikaru, Keika Matsuoka, and Mizuki Inoue, but it was decided that Rina Takenaka would be in the group instead of Mizuki.

Hinoi Team's debut was set for February 5, 2005, but was pushed back until May 18. Their first single, "IKE IKE", was the start of Hinoi Team's rising popularity.

The group continued to release singles through 2007, two of which, "NIGHT OF FIRE" and "Sticky Tricky & Bang", featured comedian-wrestler Koriki Choshu. After the release of the Hinoi Team's sixth single, "Dancin' & Dreamin'", it appears that the group is no longer together, as there has been no group work since.

In the spring of 2007, Asuka released a new solo single, "Asu e no Hikari" (明日への光, Light toward Tomorrow). The title track was the ending theme for the anime My Bride Is a Mermaid (瀬戸の花嫁, A Bride in Seto). She has not released any singles since then, but has continued to model for some fashion magazines. However, she contributed a song, Suiren (睡蓮, Water Lily), to the compilation album Flower Festival: Vision Factory Presents, released in March 2008.

== Discography ==
=== Singles ===
- [2003-11-19] Wanna Be Your Girlfriend
- [2004-04-14] Tatta Hitori no Kimi (たったひとりの君, You as Only One Person)
- [2007-05-02] Asu e no Hikari (明日への光, Light Toward Tomorrow)
- [2008-03-19] Suiren (睡蓮, Water Lilies)

== Filmography ==
=== Films ===
- Ikenie no Jirenma (2013) (as Kanae Ochi)
- School Girl's Gestation (2014) (as Chisato)
- Sharing (2014)
- Kabukicho Love Hotel (2014)
- Black Widow Business (2016) (as Risa Sugimura)
- A Beautiful Star (2017)
- Flea-picking Samurai (2018)
- The Master of Funerals (2019)

=== TV Drama ===
- My Relentless Wife 2 (2007)
- AIBOU: Tokyo Detective Duo (2013) (as Mitsuru Tachikawa in season 12, episode 1)
- Mysterious Transfer Student (2014)
- Shiroi Kyotō (2019)

== Written Media ==
=== Photobooks ===
- ASUKA (February 2007), Wani Books, ISBN 4-8470-2991-7 (editor:Nemoto Yoshinobu)

=== Magazines ===
- Love Berry
- Kindai
- Cawaii!
