= Kazuyuki Ishihara =

Japanese garden designer

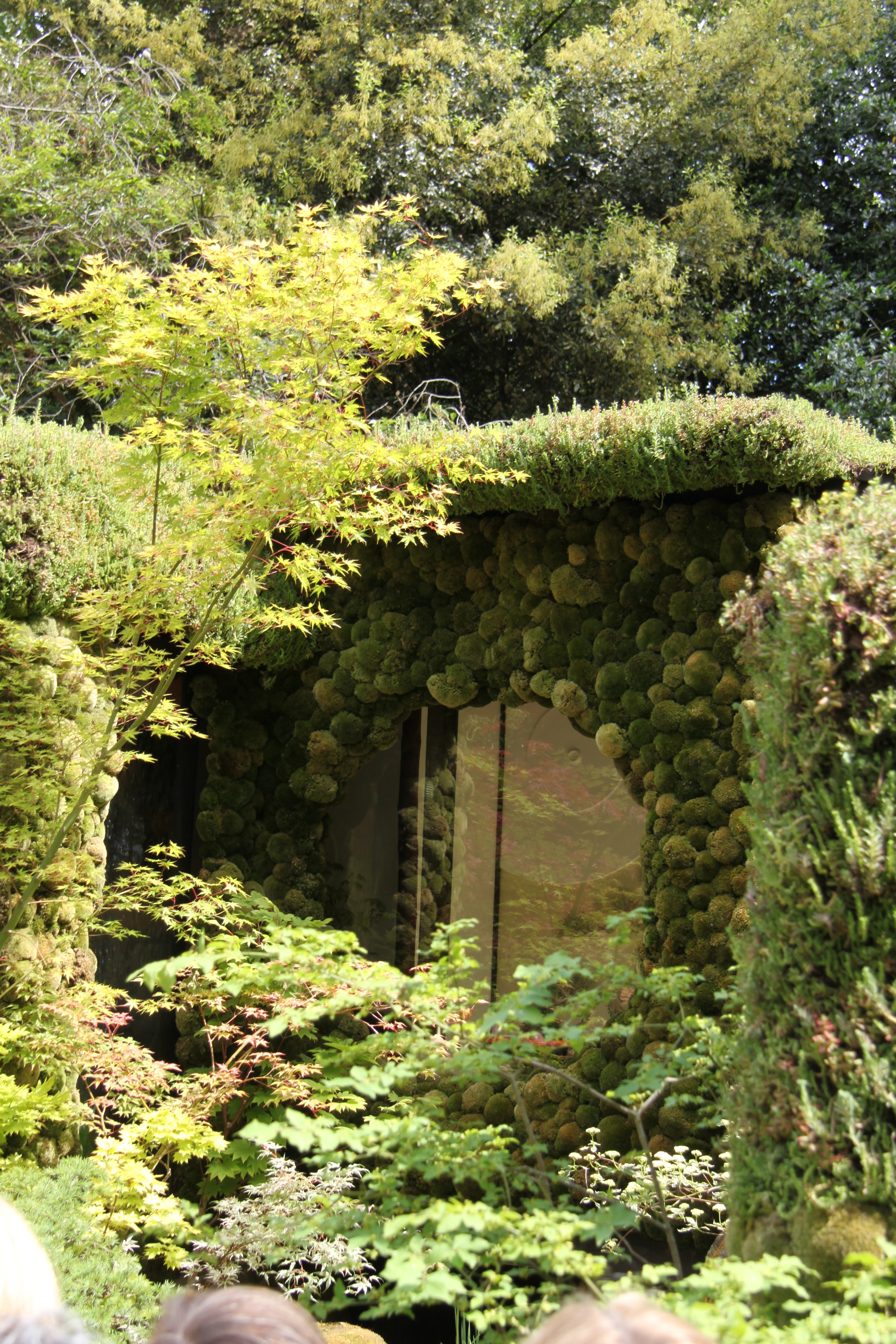
His show garden, Togenkyo (桃源郷 Tōgenkyō, translated on the English version of Ishihara's blog as "Peach Blossom Utopia" and an allusion to the Chinese work The Peach Blossom Spring), won a gold medal and the Best Artisan garden award at the Chelsea Flower Show in 2014

Kazuyuki Ishihara (石原和幸 Ishihara Kazuyuki) is a Japanese garden designer who has won many gold medals at the Chelsea Flower Show. His design for 2019 is an artisan garden, "Green Switch", whose theme is switching from the urban environment to a natural one. It is planted with horsetail, iris, maple, moss, pine, watercress and features two waterfalls and a Japanese tea room.

== Biography ==
Kazuyuki Ishihara was born in 1958, in Nagasaki Prefecture. When he was 22 he began studying ikenobō-school ikebana.
