= Sumiyoshi Shrine =

Sumiyoshi Shrine may refer to:

- Sumiyoshi-taisha, a Shinto shrine in Sumiyoshi ward in Osaka, Japan
- Sumiyoshi Shrine (Fukuoka), a Shinto shrine at Hakata in Fukuoka Prefecture on the island of Kyushu
- Sumiyoshi Shrine (Hokkaidō)
- Sumiyoshi Shrine (Shimonoseki)
- Sumiyoshi Shrine (Iki City)
