= Sumiyoshihigashi Station =

Railway station in Osaka, Japan

Sumiyoshihigashi Station 住吉東駅
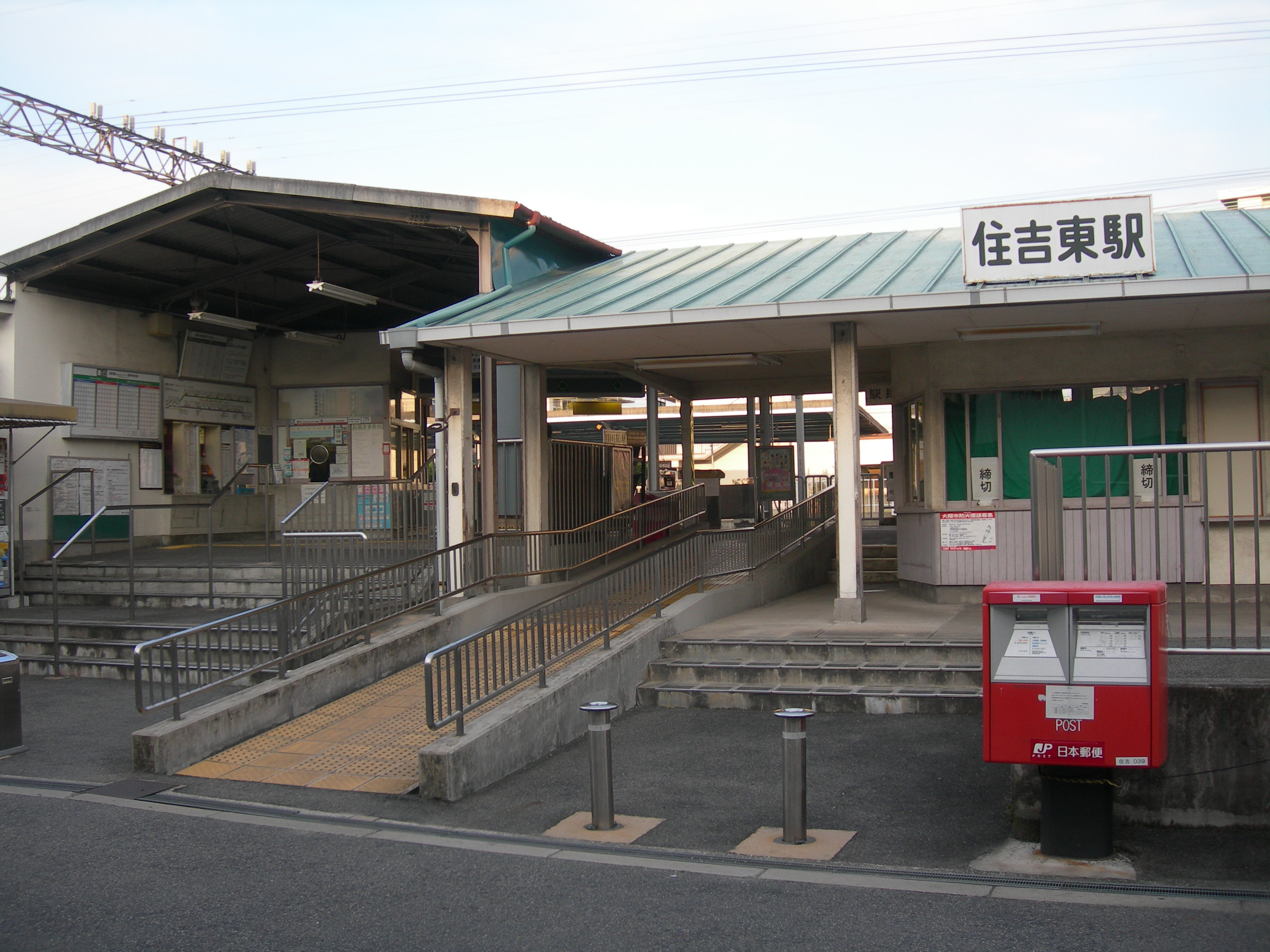
- Sumiyoshihigashi Station building (for Namba) in March 2009

General information
- Location: 1-8-49, Sumiyoshi, Sumiyoshi, Osaka （大阪府大阪市住吉区住吉一丁目8番49号） Osaka Prefecture; Japan
- Coordinates: 34°36′46.6″N 135°29′50.8″E
- Operator: Nankai Electric Railway
- Line: Koya Line

Other information
- Station code: NK52
- Website: Official website

History
- Opened: 1900

Passengers
- 6,867 daily
Location
- Location within Japan

Sumiyoshihigashi Station (住吉東駅, Sumiyoshihigashi-eki) is a railway station in Sumiyoshi-ku, Osaka, Osaka Prefecture, Japan, operated by the private railway operator Nankai Electric Railway.

== Lines ==
Sumiyoshihigashi Station is served by the Koya Line, and has the station number "NK52".

== Adjacent stations ==
«	Service	»
Koya Line
Limited Express "Koya", "Rinkan", "Semboku Liner": Does not stop at this station
Rapid Express: Does not stop at this station
Express: Does not stop at this station
Sub Express: Does not stop at this station
Semi-Express: Does not stop at this station
Tezukayama	Local	Sawanochō

== Surrounding area ==
- Kaminoki Station (Hankai Tramway Uemachi Line)
- Osaka Sumiyoshicho Post Office
- Shogon Jodo-ji

== See also ==
- List of railway stations in Japan
