= Abikomae Station =

Railway station in Osaka, Japan

Abikomae Station 我孫子前駅
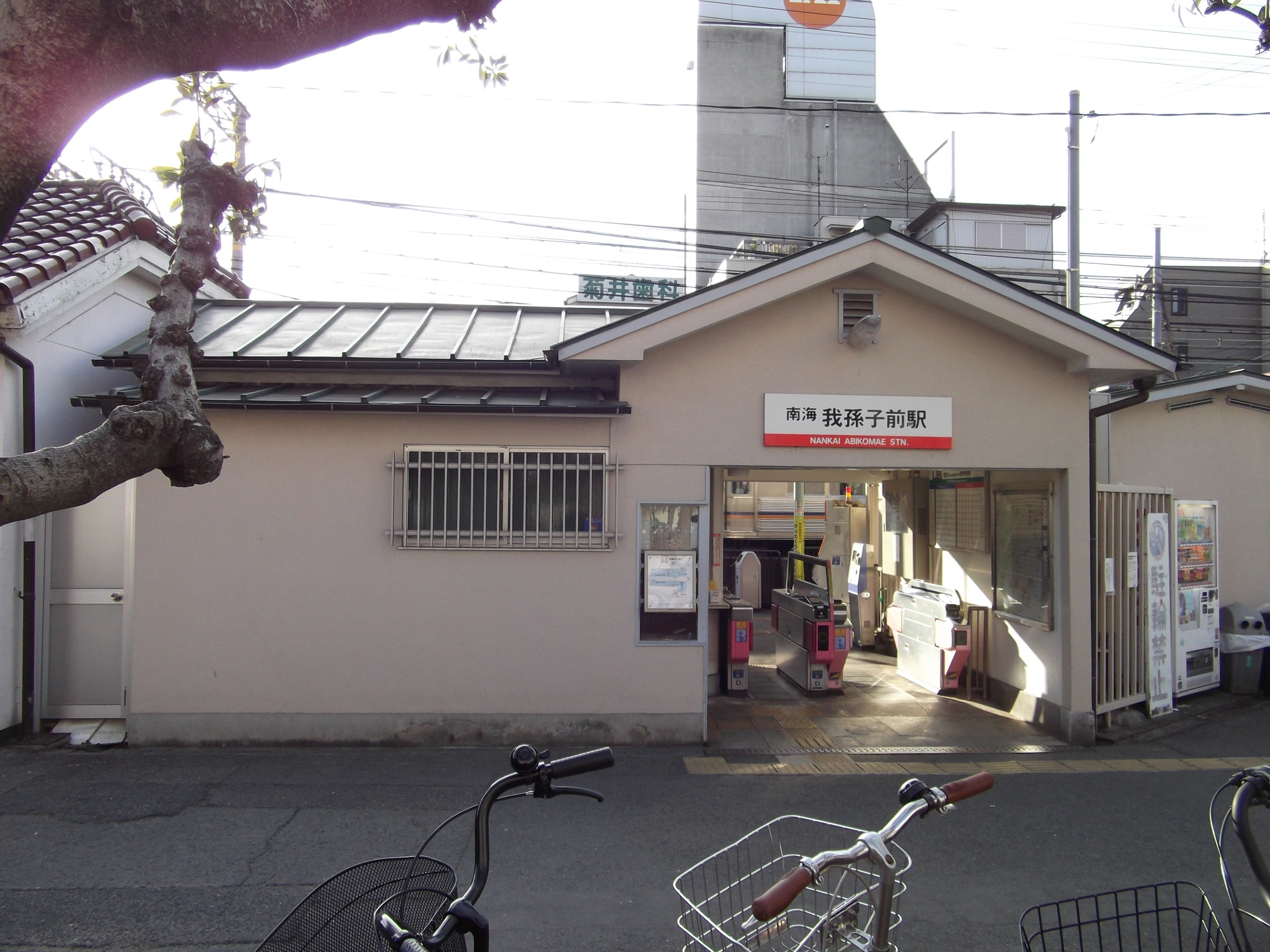
- Abikomae Station in February 2011

General information
- Location: 1-11-17, Oriono, Sumiyoshi, Osaka （大阪府大阪市住吉区遠里小野一丁目11番17号） Osaka Prefecture; Japan
- Coordinates: 34°36′2.0″N 135°29′49.5″E
- Operator: Nankai Electric Railway
- Line: Koya Line

Other information
- Station code: NK54
- Website: Official website

History
- Opened: 1907

Passengers
- 8,395 daily
Location
- Location within Japan

Abikomae Station (我孫子前駅, Abikomae-eki) is a railway station in Sumiyoshi-ku, Osaka, Osaka Prefecture, Japan, operated by the private railway operator Nankai Electric Railway.

== Lines ==
Abikomae Station is served by the Koya Line, and has the station number "NK54".

== Adjacent stations ==
«	Service	»
Koya Line
Limited Express "Koya", "Rinkan", "Semboku Liner": Does not stop at this station
Rapid Express: Does not stop at this station
Express: Does not stop at this station
Sub Express: Does not stop at this station
Semi-Express: Does not stop at this station
Sawanochō	Local	Asakayama

== See also ==
- List of railway stations in Japan
