= Sawanochō Station =

Railway station in Osaka, Japan

Sawanochō Station 沢ノ町駅
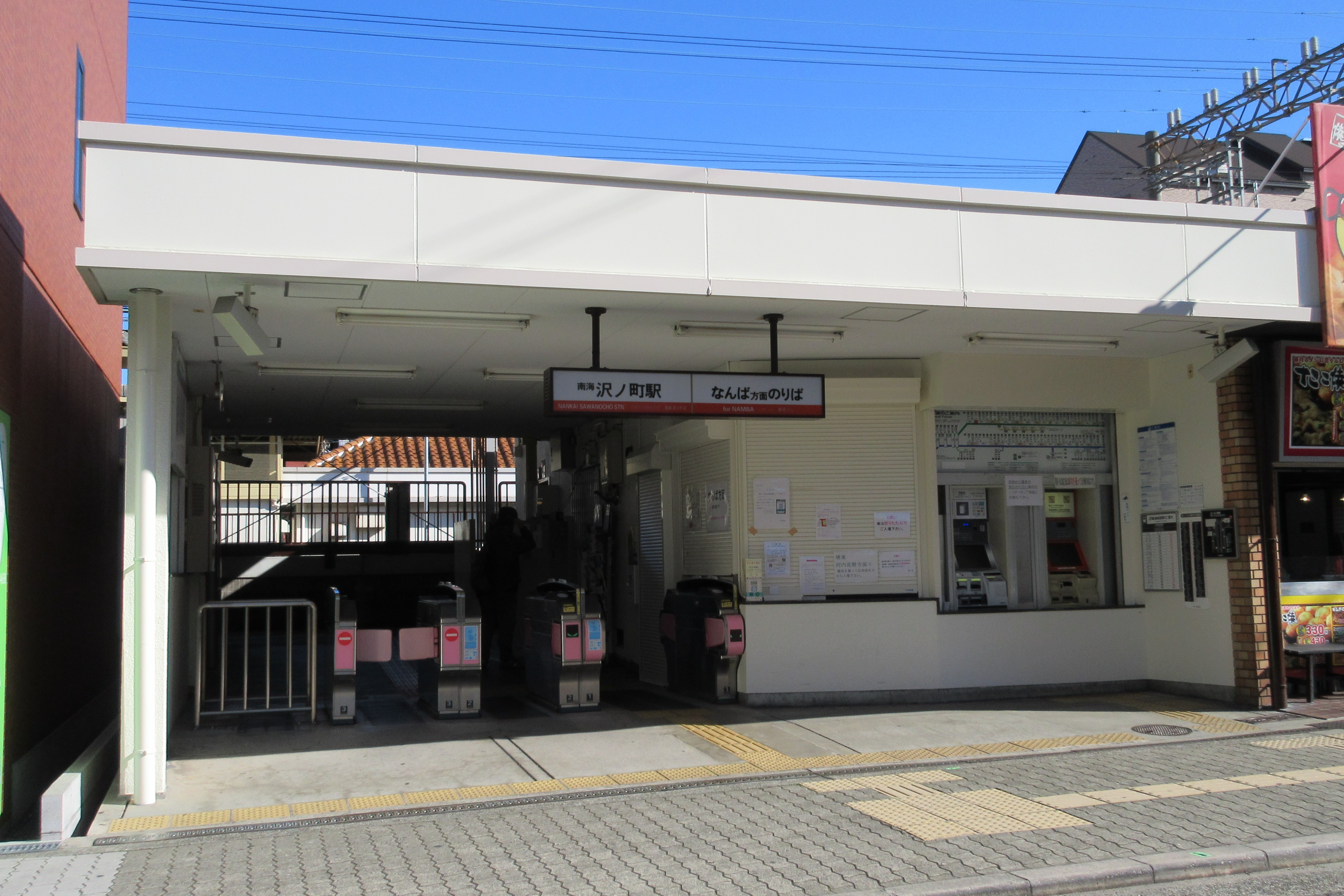
- Sawanochō Station west gate

General information
- Location: 2-4-3, Tonotsuji, Sumiyoshi, Osaka （大阪府大阪市住吉区殿辻二丁目4番3号） Osaka Prefecture; Japan
- Coordinates: 34°36′22.2″N 135°29′49.2″E
- Operator: Nankai Electric Railway
- Line: Koya Line

Other information
- Station code: NK53
- Website: Official website

History
- Opened: 1942

Passengers
- 8,098 daily
Location
- Location within Japan

Sawanochō Station (沢ノ町駅, Sawanochō-eki) is a railway station in Sumiyoshi-ku, Osaka, Osaka Prefecture, Japan, operated by the private railway operator Nankai Electric Railway.

== Lines ==
Sawanochō Station is served by the Koya Line, and has the station number "NK53".

== Adjacent stations ==
«	Service	»
Koya Line
Limited Express "Koya", "Rinkan", "Semboku Liner": Does not stop at this station
Rapid Express: Does not stop at this station
Express: Does not stop at this station
Sub Express: Does not stop at this station
Semi-Express: Does not stop at this station
Sumiyoshihigashi	Local	Abikomae

== See also ==
- List of railway stations in Japan
