= Asakayama =

Asakayama may refer to:

- Asakayama stable, a stable of sumo wrestlers
- Asakayama Oyakata, the head coach of Asakayama stable, ex-ōzeki Kaiō Hiroyuki
- Asakayama Station, a railway station in Sakai-ku, Sakai, Japan
