= Sumiyoshi Shrine (Shimonoseki) =

Shinto shrine in Yamaguchi prefecture, Japan

Sumiyoshi Shrine 住吉神社
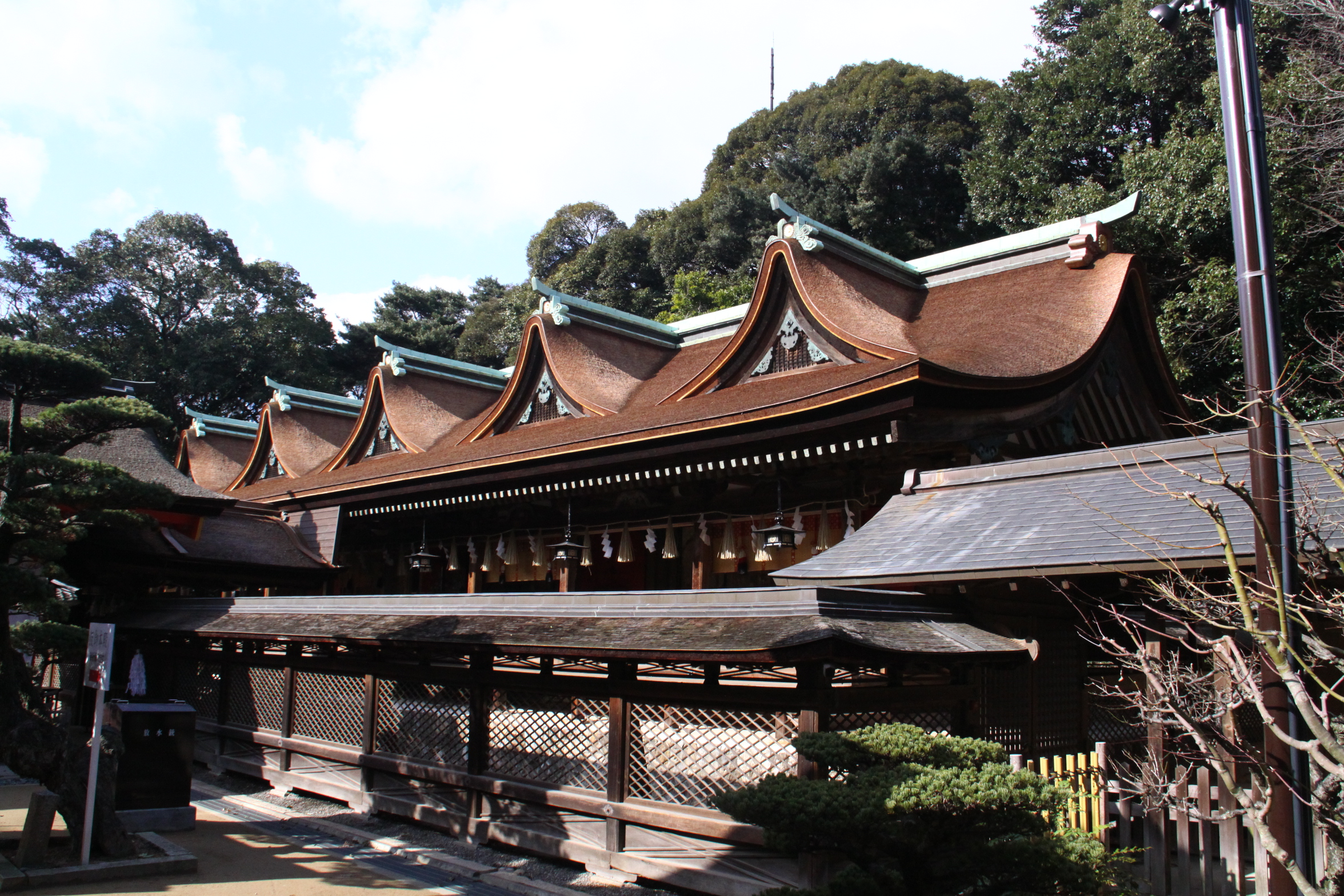
- Honden of Sumiyoshi Shrine

- Sumiyoshi Shrine Sumiyoshi Shrine (Shimonoseki) (Japan)

Religion
- Affiliation: Shinto
- Deity: Sumiyoshi sanjin
- Festival: December 15
- Type: Sumiyoshi

Location
- Location: 11-1 Ichinomiyasumiyoshi 1-chōme, Shimonoseki-shi, Yamaguchi-ken 751-0805
- Interactive map of Sumiyoshi Shrine 住吉神社
- Coordinates: 33°59′58.6″N 130°57′23.6″E

Sumiyoshi Shrine (住吉神社) is a Shinto shrine in the Miyasumiyoshi neighborhood of the city of Shimonoseki in Yamaguchi Prefecture, Japan. It is the ichinomiya of former Nagato Province. The main festival of the shrine is held annually on December 15. Along with the more famous Sumiyoshi-taisha in Osaka and the Sumiyoshi Jinja in Fukuoka, it is one of the "Three Great Sumiyoshi" shrines; however whereas the Osaka Sumitomo-taisha enshrines the Nigi-Mitama, or placid spirit of the Sumiyoshi kami, the shrine in Shimonoseki enshrines the Ara-Mitama, or rough spirit of the kami.

== Enshrined kami ==
The kami enshrined at Sumiyoshi Jinja are:

- Sumiyoshi sanjin (住吉三神)
- Emperor Ōjin (応神天皇)
- Takenouchi no Sukune (武内宿禰命)
- Empress Jingū (神功皇后)
- Takeminakata (建御名方命)

== History ==
The origins of Itakiso Jinja are unknown. Per the Nihon Shoki, when the legendary Empress Jingū embarked on her conquest of the Korean Peninsula, she entrusted the Sumitomo sanjin to protect her passage across the ocean. En route back to Japan, she had a message from the gods that their oracle was to be found in Nagato Province, where a shrine should be built. The shrine first appears in the historical record in an entry dated 859 in the Nihon Sandai Jitsuroku. In the 927 Engishiki it is listed as a Myojin Taisha (名神大社) and is called the ichinomiya of the province. The shrine was worshipped by the military classes and as a guardian of maritime traffic. From the Kamakura period, it received donations from successive shogun, including Minamoto no Yoritomo. Although the shrine declined in the Muromachi period, during the Sengoku and Edo Periods it was patronized by the Ōuchi clan and the Mōri clan, daimyō of Chōshū Domain.

After the Meiji Restoration, it was listed as a National Shrine, 2nd rank (国幣中社, Kokuhei Chūsha) in 1871, and promoted to an Imperial Shrine, 2nd rank (官幣中社, kanpei-chūsha) in 1911.

The shrine is located a twenty-minute walk from Shin-Shimonoseki Station on the Sanyo Shinkansen.

== Cultural properties ==
=== National Treasures ===
- Honden (本殿), Muromachi period (1370). This a unique structure based on a modification of the nagare-zukuri style, but with five separate bays, each with its own small gable, to provide five sanctuaries, one for each of the five kami worshipped at the shrine. It interior is decorated with colored paintings.

=== National Important Cultural Properties ===
- Haiden (拝殿), Muromachi period (1539); It is a three by one bay structure with a single-gable roof which is covered in hinoki cypress bark shingles. This hall of worship is built at right angles to the center of the front of the main hall. The floor is low and open on all sides. Detailed techniques of its construction are characteristic of the end of the Muromachi period.
- Dōgane (銅鐘), Silla; With an overall height of 147.0 cm and a diameter of 78.3 cm it is the largest Korean bell in Japan. The body is long and smooth, with a bulge on the waist, and a slightly squeezed rim. The body has lotus petal and cloud decorations with four celestial maidens flying in the air.
- Gilt-bronze Horse fittings (金銅牡丹唐草透唐鞍), Muromachi period. These include a saddle, harness and stirrups with an old bronze peony arabesque decoration, in the style of the Tang dynasty, used for festivals and ceremonies. The set was a donation by Ōuchi Yoshitaka.
- Horaku Hyakushu Waka Strip (住吉社法楽百首和歌短冊), Muromachi period (1495). Sōgi, a leading figure in renga poetry, came to Nagato twice (1480 and 1489) under the protection of Ōuchi Masahiro, where he played a major role in editing the Shinsen Tsukubashū. He donated a strip of poetry with 30 works by famous people, including Sanjōnishi Sanetaka, Emperor Go-Kashiwabara, and others in a cedar box, It was later divided into individual works and placed in a lacquer box by Mōri Hidemoto.

=== National Registered Tangible Cultural Properties ===
- Rōmon (楼門), Meiji period (1901);
- Karamon Gate and Lattice Wall (楼門), Meiji period (1901);

=== Yamaguchi Prefecture Designated Tangible Cultural Properties ===
- Wooden ema depicting a tethered horse (板絵着色繋馬図), Muromachi period, set of two; Painted on cypress boards, each measures 43.5 cm tall and 59 cm wide. Both depict horses tied to a stable; one horse with its head bowed eating straw, while the other horse stands with its head raised. Both are signed "by Unkei." The paint has peeled badly, making it difficult to identify the original colors, but the ink lines remain fairly well preserved. Unkei's birth and death years are unclear, but he was a painter of the Tenbun era (1532-1554) who succeeded the Sesshū school.
- Wooden ema by Kanō Hōgai (狩野芳崖筆板絵着色絵馬), Edo period; This is one of six votive plaques by Kanō Hōgai, depicting Yujo, a vassal of the Grand Minister of the Jin Dynasty who attacked his lord's enemy. He was initially pardoned for his loyalty, but attacked the enemy again and was eventually killed. This painting depicts the story of how he achieved his goal by stabbing his enemy's clothes. It is inscribed with ink and dated to 1885 (Meiji 18), but its distinctive lines and gorgeous colors suggest it was created during the Keiō period (1865-1867)
- Nagato Province Ichinomiya Sumiyoshi Jinja records (長門国一の宮住吉神社社叢), Kamakura to Edo period; consisting of 117 items, including the oldest donation letter from 1247 (Hōji 1), nine from the Kamakura period, eight from the Nanboku-chō period, 66 from the Muromachi period, and 34 from the Azuchi-Momoyama period to the early Edo period.

== Gallery ==
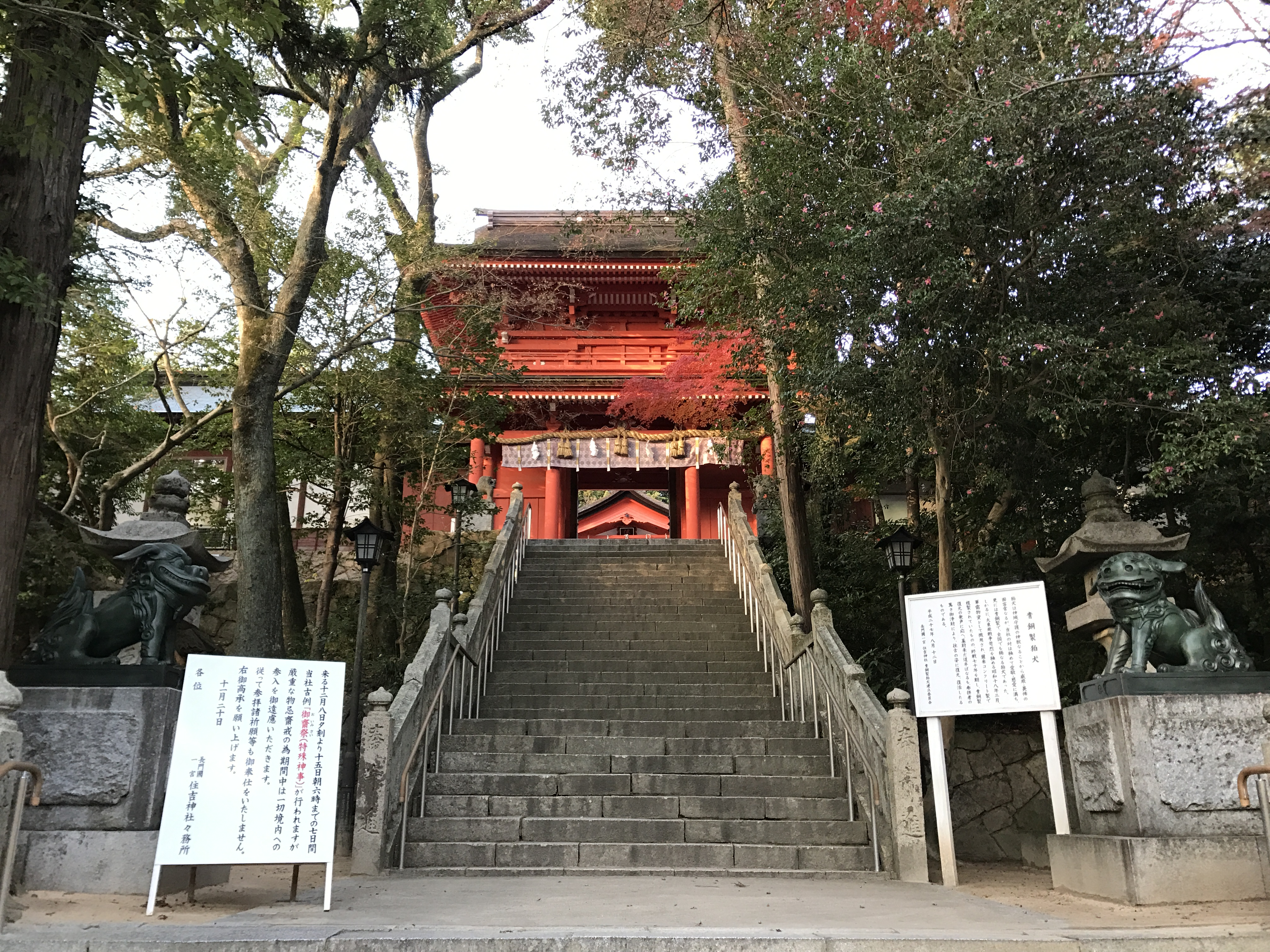
Romon

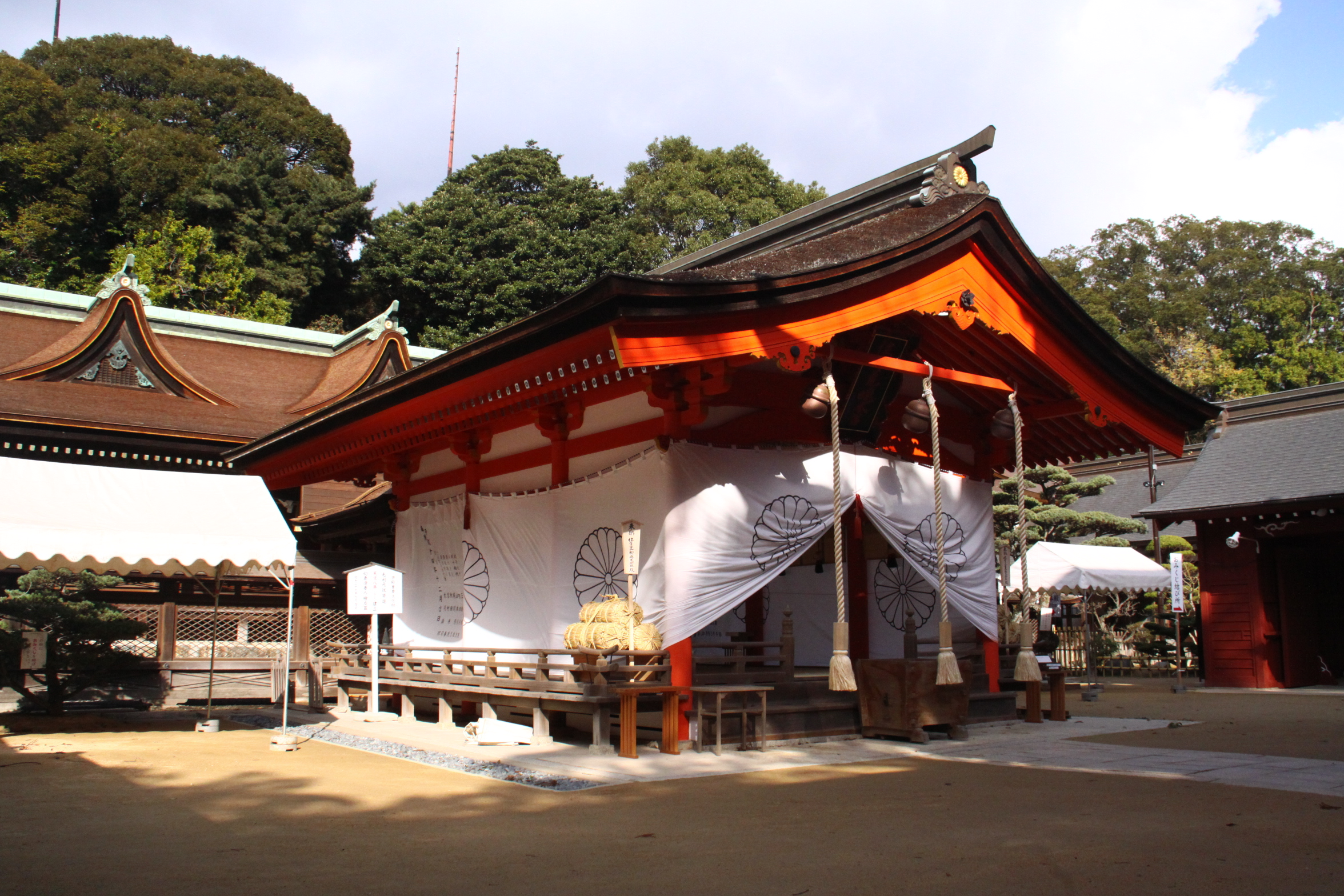
Haiden

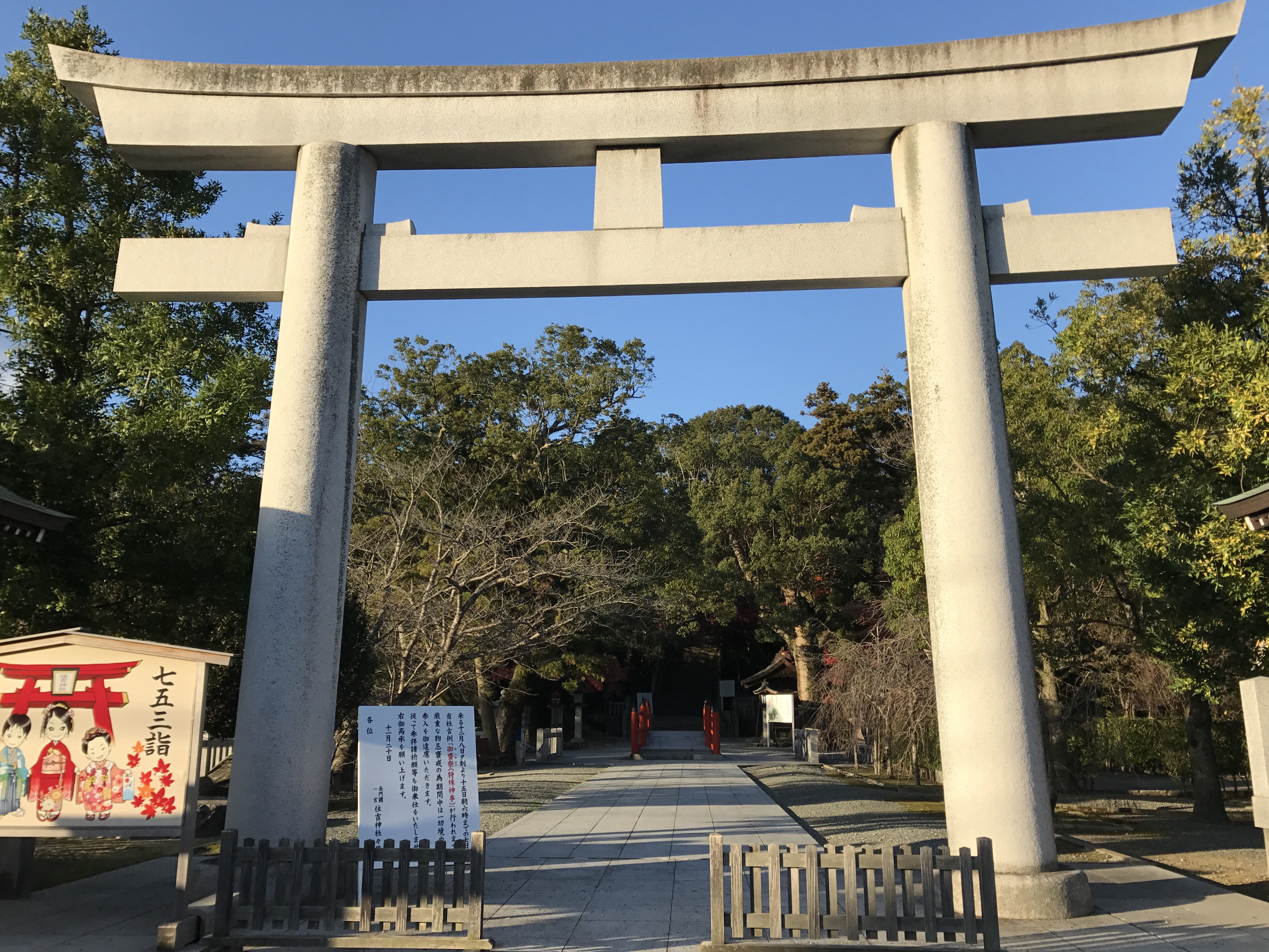
1st Torii

== See also ==
- Ichinomiya
- List of National Treasures of Japan (shrines)
