= Tezukayama =

Tezukayama may refer to:

- Tezukayama Station, a railway station in Osaka, Japan
- Tezukayama University, a university in Nara, Japan
- Tezukayama Gakuin University, a university in Osaka Prefecture, Japan
