= Sumiyoshi Shrine (Fukuoka) =

Shinto shrine in Fukuoka Prefecture, Japan

Sumiyoshi Shrine 住吉神社
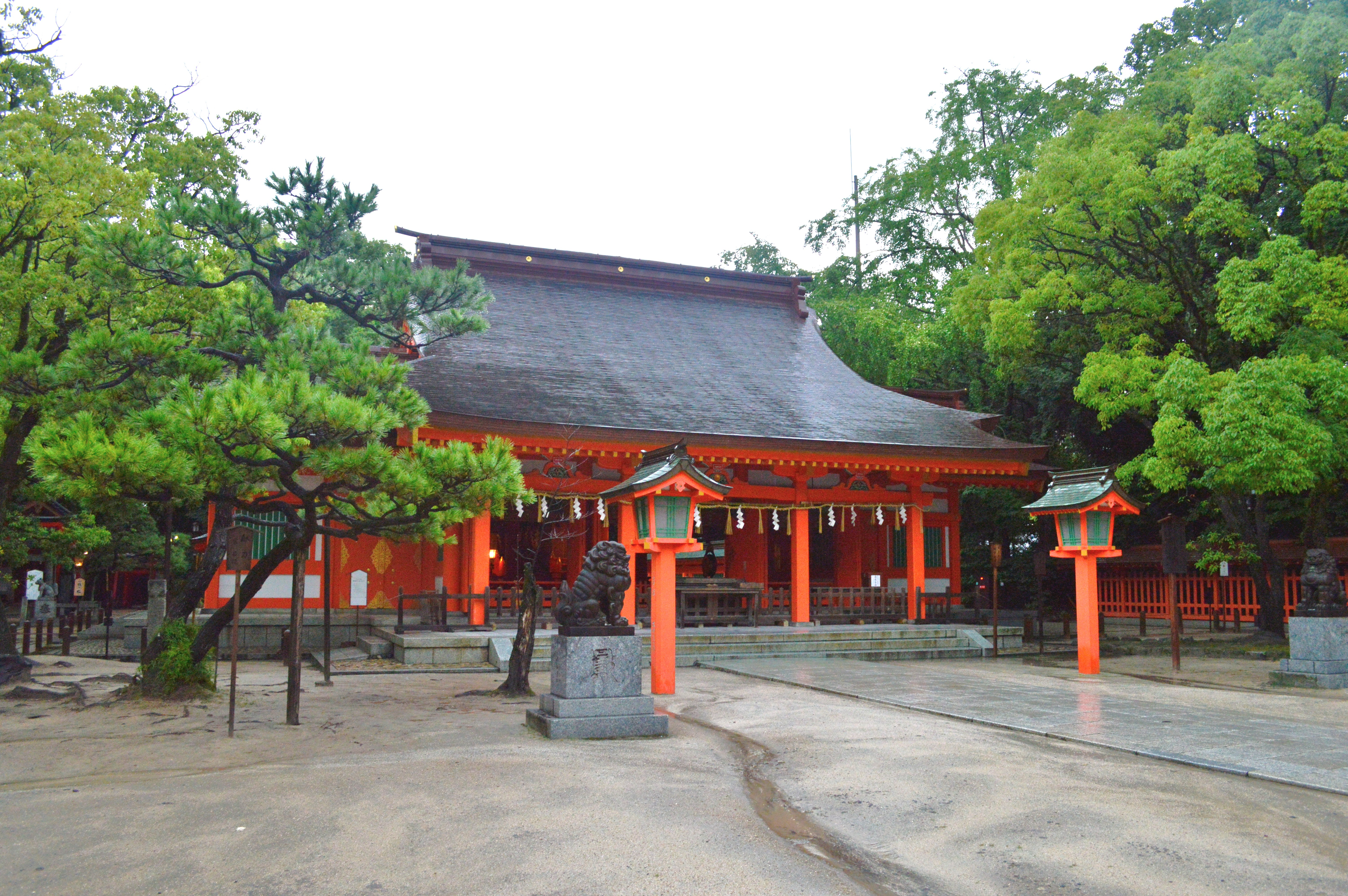
- Haiden of Sumiyoshi Shrine

- Sumiyoshi Shrine Sumiyoshi Shrine (Fukuoka) (Japan)

Religion
- Affiliation: Shinto
- Deity: Sumiyoshi sanjin
- Festival: October 13
- Type: Sumiyoshi

Location
- Location: 3-1-51 Sumiyoshi, Hakata-ku, Fukuoka-shi, Fukuoka-ken
- Interactive map of Sumiyoshi Shrine 住吉神社
- Coordinates: 33°35′9.26″N 130°24′49.33″E

Architecture
- Style: Sumiyoshi-zukuri

Sumiyoshi Shrine (住吉神社) is a Shinto shrine in the Sumiyoshi neighborhood of Hakata-ku, Fukuoka in Fukuoka Prefecture, Japan. It is the ichinomiya of former Chikuzen Province. The main festival of the shrine is held annually on October 13. Along with the more famous Sumiyoshi-taisha in Osaka and the Sumiyoshi Jinja in Shimonoseki, Yamaguchi, it is one of the "Three Great Sumiyoshi" shrines.

== Enshrined kami ==
The kami enshrined at Sumiyoshi Jinja are:

- Sumiyoshi sanjin (住吉三神)
- Empress Jingū (神功皇后)
- Amaterasu (天照皇大神)

== Origins ==
Per the shrine's legend (Chikuzen Sumiyoshi Daimyojin Goengi), the shrine is the birthplace of the Sumiyoshi cult and the origin for all Sumiyoshi shrines in the country. Unlike Hakata, which is located on sand dunes, the area surrounding the shrine grounds is located on the alluvial land of the Naka River, and topographically located on the cape of Reizeitsu, which juts out into the mouths of the Hie River and the Naka River. This was thought to be a suitable location for a place of worship for the guardian deity of navigation. Bronze spear and a bronze sword from the Yayoi Period have been excavated from the shrine grounds, and it is theorized that this area was originally a sacred place for Nakoku or the Amabe maritime tribe.

== History ==
The foundation of the Sumitomo Shrine in Hakozaki is unknown. It first appears in historical documentation in an entry in the Shoku Nihongi dated April 737, when it is recorded that offerings were made to "Chikushi Sumiyoshi" and to Ise Grand Shrine in response to disrespectful actions by the kingdom of Silla in the Korean Peninsula. Per a survey dated 806, 36 shrines were dedicated to Sumiyoshi in Chikuzen Province, and in 847 the monk Ennin and in 852 the monk Enchin recited Buddhist sutras at the shrine on their return from Tang China. In 878, it was placed under the direct protection of the Imperial Court after an oracle at Kashii-gū warned of a possible attack by Silla. In the Engishiki, the shrine is listed as a Myojin Taisha and in 1019, the shrine was entrusted to Emperor Go-Ichijō as a "once-in-a-generation" offering. It has been regarded as the ichinomiya of Chikuzen Province since the late Heian period. Takezaki Suenaga's Mōko Shūrai Ekotoba depicts the vermilion torii gate of Sumiyoshi Shrine. In 1480, the renga master Sōgi visited the shrine, and wrote about the devastation of Sumiyoshi Shrine due to war in the "Tsukushi Doki". During the Sengoku period, the shrine records and old documents were taken by Ōuchi Yoshitaka to Yamaguchi and were destroyed in the Tainei-ji incident of 1551. The current shrine was restored by Kuroda Nagamasa, the first daimyō of Fukuoka Domain in 1623. Subsequent rulers of the domain continued to support the shrine to the Meiji restoration. Under the Meiji government's State Shinto's system of ranked Shinto shrines, Sumiyoshi Shrine was ranked as a Prefectural Shrine in 1872, and promoted to an Imperial shrine, 3rd rank (官幣小社, Kanpei-shōsha) in 1925.

In 2004, archaeological excavations began around the precincts. In a total of three excavations up to 2014, the remains of a mansion from the medieval to early modern period were discovered along with artifacts related to rituals.

== Cultural Properties ==
- Honden (本殿) - The main hall of the shrine was built by Kuroda Nagamasa in 1623 during the early Edo period. It is in the Sumiyoshi-zukuri style, which is considered to be an older form of shrine architecture. It is a gabled structure and the roof is thatched with cypress bark. The pillars are painted vermilion and the wooden walls are painted white. It was designated as a National Important Cultural Property in 1922.

== Gallery ==
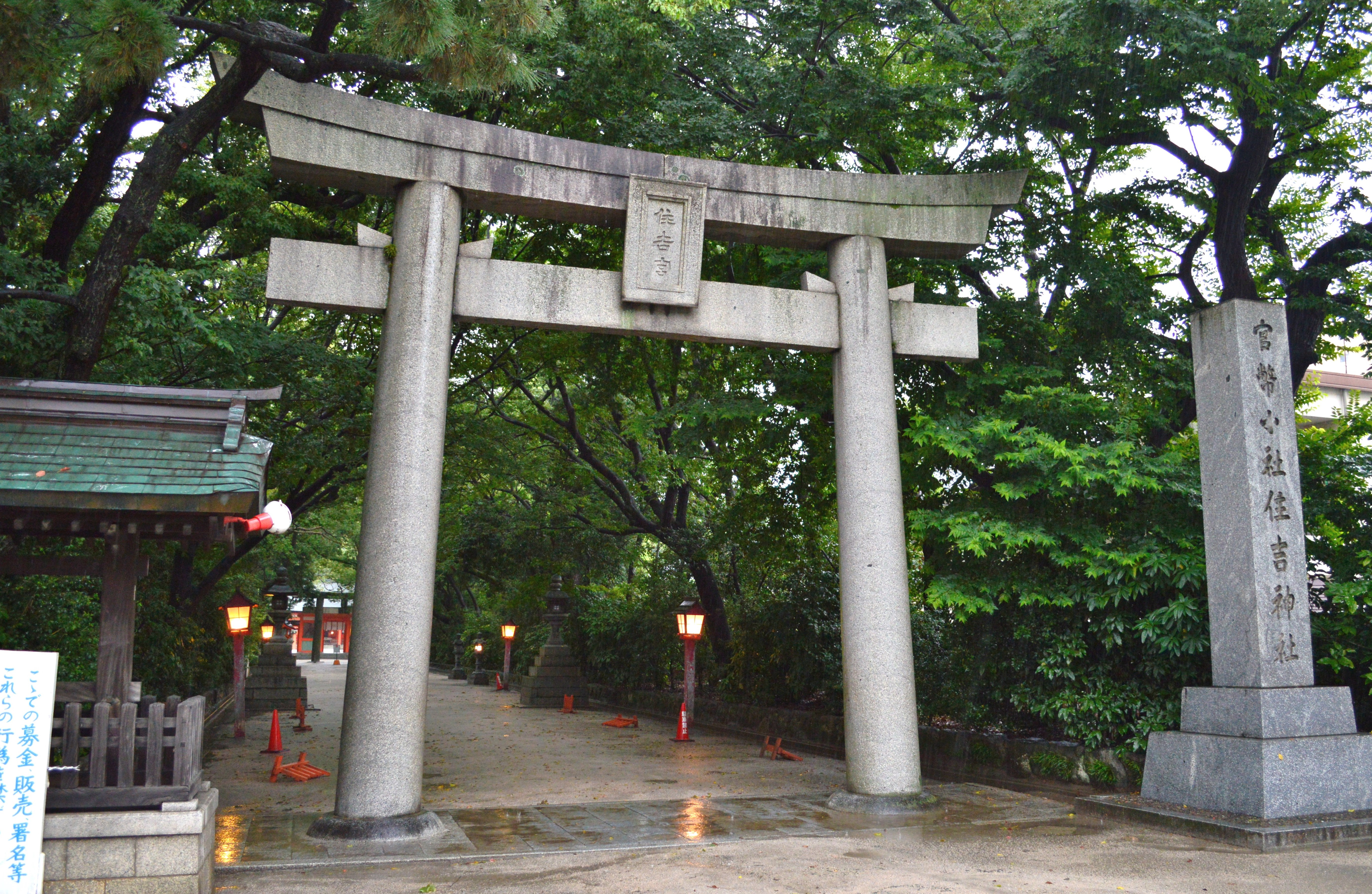
Torii

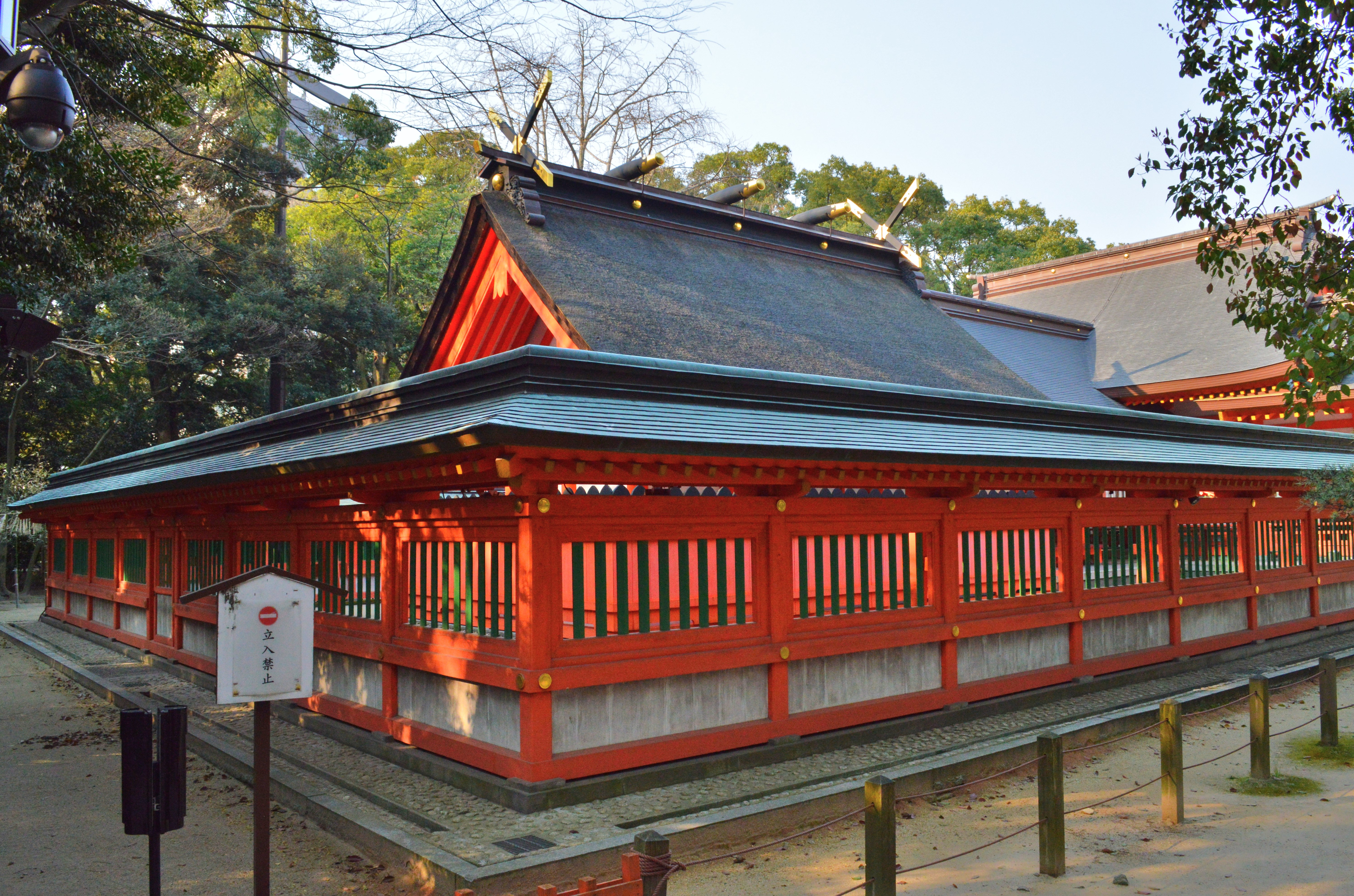
Honden (ICP)

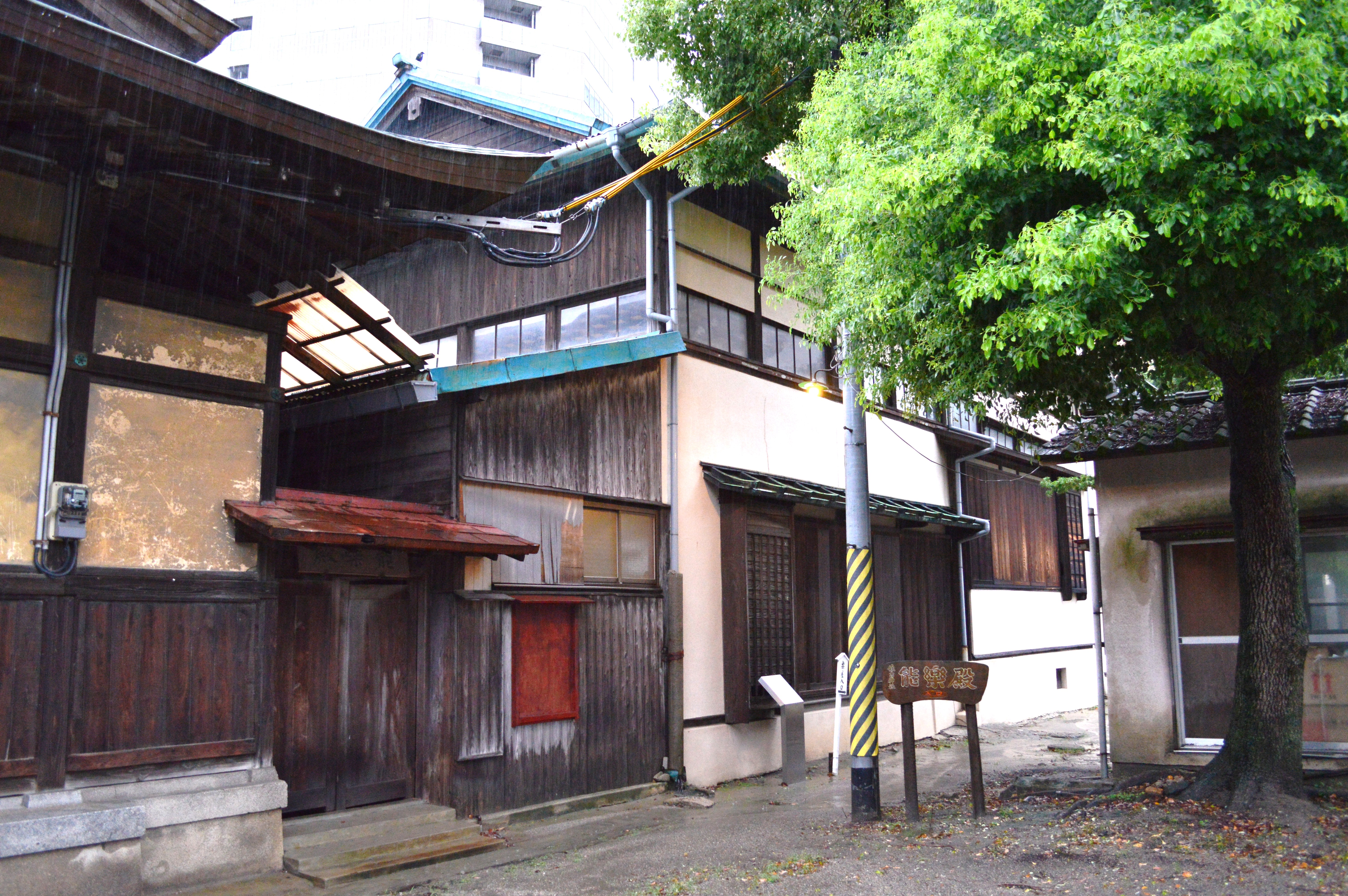
Noh Theatre

== See also ==
- Ichinomiya
