= Naoki Matoba =

Japanese baseball player (born 1977)

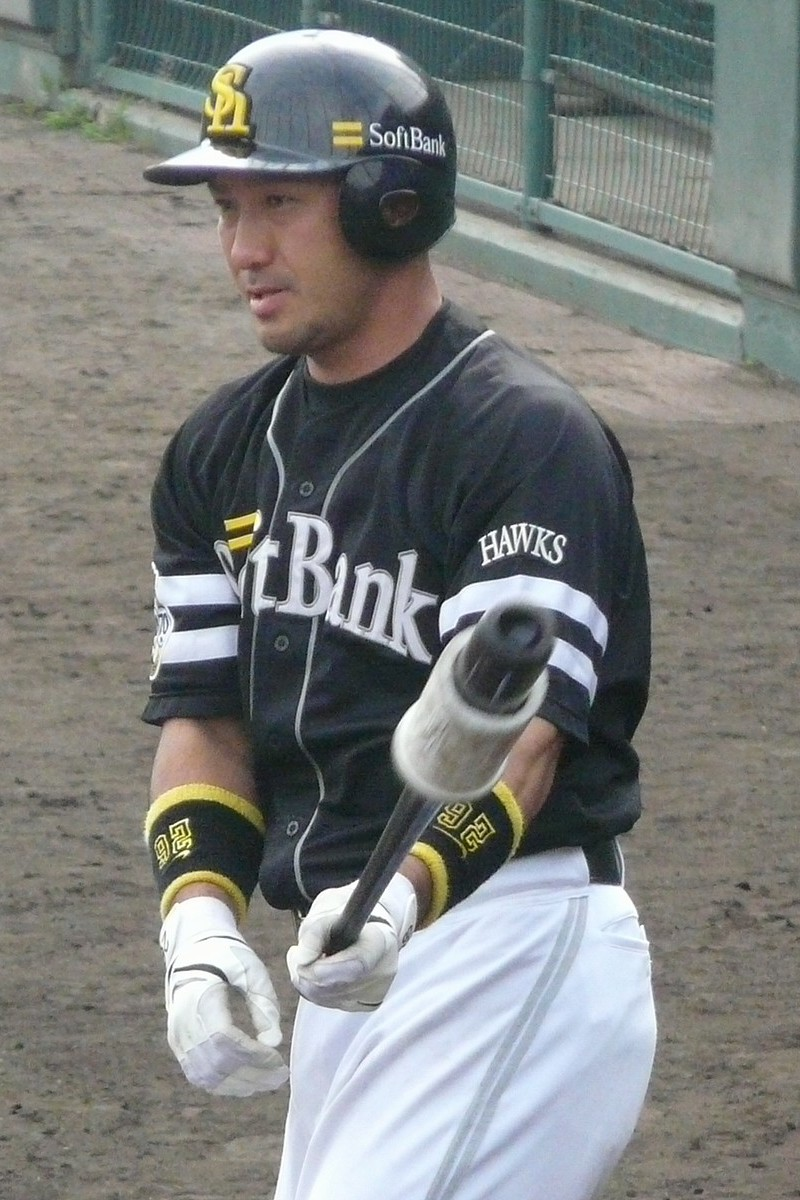

Hokkaido Nippon-Ham Fighters – No. 71
- Catcher / Coach
- Born: May 9, 1977 (age 48); Sumiyoshi-ku, Osaka, Japan
- Batted: Right Threw: Right

NPB debut
- April 30, 2000, for the Fukuoka Daiei Hawks

Last NPB appearance
- October 1, 2011, for the Chiba Lotte Marines

NPB statistics
- Batting average: .161
- Home runs: 5
- Runs batted in: 42

Teams
- As player: Fukuoka Daiei Hawks/Fukuoka SoftBank Hawks (2000,2003–2008); Chiba Lotte Marines (2010–2011); As coach: Hokkaido Nippon-Ham Fighters (2014–2017, 2025–present); Chiba Lotte Marines (2018–2022); Tohoku Rakuten Golden Eagles (2023–2024)

Naoki Matoba (的場 直樹, Matoba Naoki; born May 9, 1977 in Osaka), nicknamed "Matton", is a Japanese former professional baseball catcher in Japan's Nippon Professional Baseball. He played for the Fukuoka Daiei Hawks/Fukuoka SoftBank Hawks in 2000, and from 2003 to 2008 and with the Chiba Lotte Marines in 2010 and 2011.

Matoba is an ordained priest within the Ōtani-ha branch of Shin Buddhism.
