= Tezukayama Station =

Railway station in Osaka, Japan

Tezukayama Station 帝塚山駅
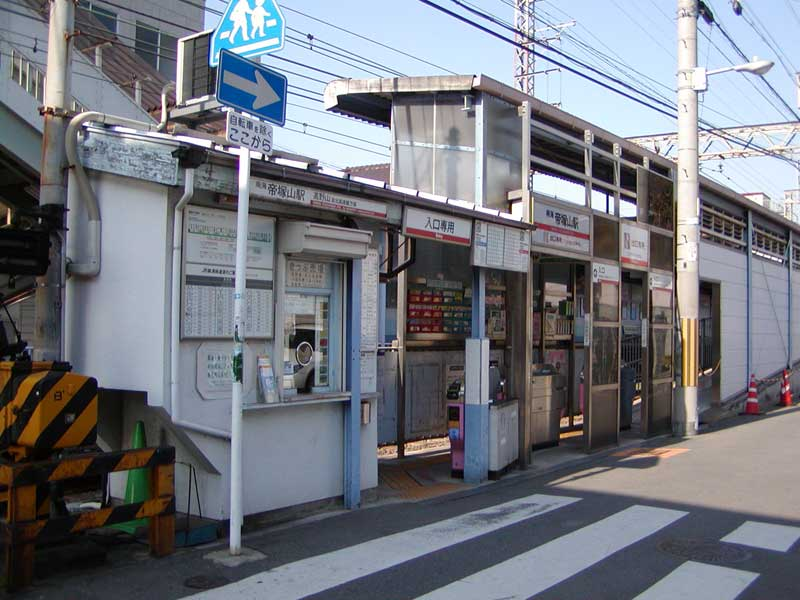
- Ticket gates for Kōyasan

General information
- Location: 1-5-8, Tezukayama-nishi, Sumiyoshi, Osaka, Osaka （大阪府大阪市住吉区帝塚山西一丁目5番8号） Japan
- Coordinates: 34°37′20.4″N 135°29′54.4″E
- Operator: Nankai Electric Railway
- Line: Kōya Line
- Platforms: 2
- Connections

Other information
- Station code: NK51

History
- Opened: 1934

Passengers
- 7,207 daily
Location

Tezukayama Station (帝塚山駅, Tezukayama-eki) is a railway station in Sumiyoshi-ku, Osaka, Osaka Prefecture, Japan.

Tezukayama Station opened in December 1934. The area around it has been a wealthy residential neighborhood since the Taisho era.

It is situated to the north of Bandaiike Park and to the south of the Tezukayama Burial Mound, said to be the tomb of Otomo no Kanemura, who ruled this area in the 5th and 6th centuries.

== Lines ==
- Nankai Electric Railway
  - Kōya Line
- Hankai Tramway
  - Uemachi Line (Tezukayama Sanchome Station)

== Adjacent stations ==
«	Service	»
Nankai Electric Railway Koya Line
Limited Express "Koya", "Rinkan", "Semboku Liner": Does not stop at this station
Rapid Express: Does not stop at this station
Express: Does not stop at this station
Sub Express: Does not stop at this station
Semi-Express: Does not stop at this station
Kishinosato-Tamade	Local	Sumiyoshihigashi
