= Suminoe no Tsu =

Oldest international port in Japan

Suminoe no Tsu (住吉津) is the oldest international port in Japan.

Said to be opened by Emperor Nintoku, Suminoe no Tsu was located on an inlet called Suminoe no Hosoe on the southern side of Sumiyoshi Grand Shrine, in the south of current day Osaka city. Hosoigawa station of the Hankai Tramway is located on the former site of the port.

East of Suminoe no Tsu is Japan's ancient capital, Asuka, in Nara Prefecture. In ancient times, Suminoe no Tsu was Japan's entrance into the Silk Road. Buddhism also entered Japan here. Japan's envoys to the Sui and Tang dynasties of China received divine protection from Sumiyoshi Daijin, the god of the sea, at Sumiyoshi Grand Shrine, before departing.

One-Inch Boy from the fairy tail Issun-bōshi also departs from Suminoe no Hosoe. He heads into Suminoe no Kai (present day Osaka Bay) then over to the Yodogawa River and up towards Kyoto.
