= Asakayama Station =

Railway station in Sakai, Japan

Asakayama Station 浅香山駅
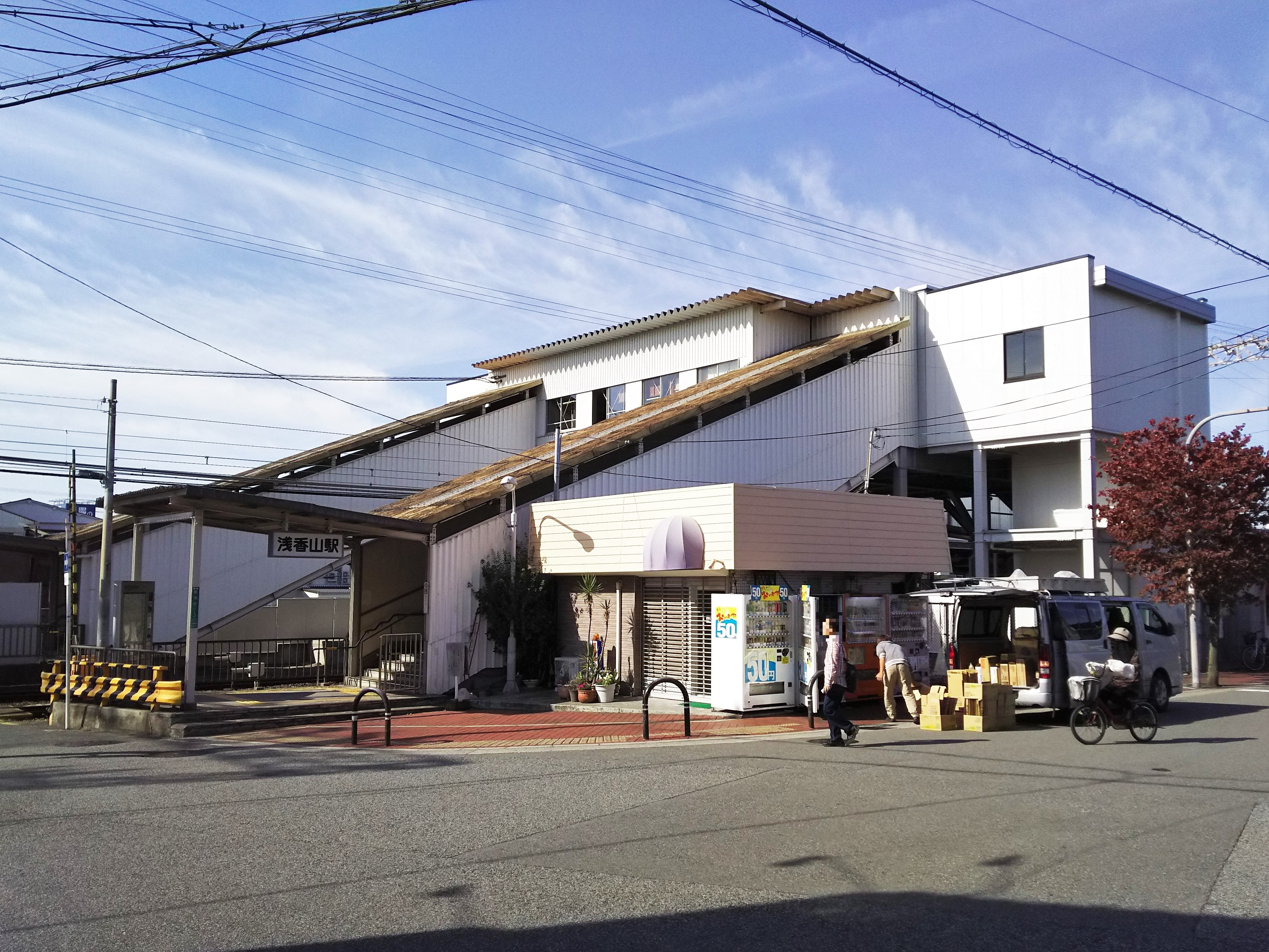
- Asakayama Station building in October 2016

General information
- Location: 3-3-1, Takasuchō, Sakai-ku, Sakai-shi, Osaka-fu 590-0003; Japan
- Coordinates: 34°35′20.7″N 135°29′27.2″E
- Operator: Nankai Electric Railway
- Line: Koya Line
- Distance: 9.4 km from Shiomibashi
- Platforms: 2 side platforms

Other information
- Station code: NK55
- Website: Official website

History
- Opened: June 22, 1915

Passengers
- 2019: 8,681 daily
Location
- Location within Osaka Prefecture Location within Japan

Asakayama Station (浅香山駅, Asakayama-eki) is a passenger railway station located in Sakai-ku, Sakai, Osaka Prefecture, Japan, operated by the private railway operator Nankai Electric Railway. It has the station number "NK55".

== Lines ==
Asakayama Station is served by the Nankai Koya Line, and is 9.4 kilometers from the terminus of the line at Shiomibashi and 8.7 kilometers from Nanba.

== Layout ==
The station consists of two opposed side platforms with an elevated station building.

=== Platforms ===
1	■ Koya Line	for Koyasan
2	■ Koya Line	for Namba

== Barrier-free construction ==
Until 2010, a building believed to be the old above-ground station building remained under the bridge station building near Koyasan on platform 2, but it was removed during the barrier-free construction in 2011. In the past, the overall difference between the platform and the train was large and it was dangerous to get on and off, but this problem was resolved by the implementation of the lifting work. At that time, the line display, clock, and station name sign were changed to new models. In the past, the bridge station building itself did not have barrier-free facilities, and dedicated passages and intercoms for wheelchair users were installed on both the upper and lower platforms (the up platform is near the aforementioned building, the down platform is near the bicycle parking lot), but with the completion of the barrier-free construction in 2011, an elevator was installed. In addition, toilets were relocated and gender-segregated and multipurpose toilets were installed.

== Adjacent stations ==
«	Service	»
Koya Line
Limited Express "Koya", "Rinkan", "Semboku Liner": Does not stop at this station
Rapid Express: Does not stop at this station
Express: Does not stop at this station
Sub Express: Does not stop at this station
Semi-Express: Does not stop at this station
Abikomae	Local	Sakaihigashi

== History ==
Asakayama Station opened on June 22, 1915.

== Passenger statistics ==
In fiscal 2019, the station was used by an average of 8681 passengers daily.

== Surrounding area ==
- Kansai University Sakai Campus
- Sakai Women's Junior College
- Kaorigaoka Liberte High School
- Asakayama General Hospital

== See also ==
- List of railway stations in Japan
