= Sumiyoshi sanjin =

Shinto gods of the sea and sailing

Sumiyoshi sanjin (住吉三神) is the generic name for the three kami (deities) in Japan: Sokotsutsu no O (底筒男命), Nakatsutsu no O (中筒男命), and Uwatsutsu no O (表筒男). The Sumiyoshi sanjin are regarded as the gods of the sea and sailing. They are sometimes referred to as the Sumiyoshi daijin (住吉大神).

Sumiyoshi-taisha has four buildings dedicated to four kami: the three Sumiyoshi brothers and Empress Jingū, who is also enshrined.

According to Japanese mythology recorded in works like the Kojiki and Nihon Shoki, the Sumiyoshi sanjin were born together with the three Watatsumi deities (綿津見三神) when Izanagi performed a misogi after returning from Yomi. The three Watatsumi kami are speculated to correspond to three historical fishing practices: Uwatsu Watatsumi (surface god), Nakatsu Watatsumi (middle depths) and Sokotsu Watatsumi (deep-sea).

Of the Shinto Shrines that enshrine the Sumiyoshi sanjin the oldest are Sumiyoshi jinja, Fukuoka; Sumiyoshi jinja, Iki City; and Moto-Sumiyoshi Shrine, Kobe. However, it is unknown which of these is the oldest.

The tsutsu part of the names of the three gods has a connection to the planets, and there is a theory that suggests the Sumiyoshi sanjin are the deification of the three main stars in Orion. In antiquity, the constellation Orion was used for navigation; perhaps for this reason, it was deified. Also, the locations of Tsutsu on Tsushima Island, Tsutsuki on Iki Island, and Tsutsuki in Itoshima, Fukuoka prefecture are in the arrangement of these three Orion stars.

== Appearances ==
Probably the most notable appearance of the Sumiuyoshi sanjin is in The Tale of Genji, where the father of the Akashi Lady prays to the luck deity to help his daughter find a husband and secure her wellbeing. The father, who is the Novitiate of the Province of Akashi, hence the name "Akashi Lady", devoutly prays to Sumiyoshi for many years, and eventually Sumiyoshi grants his prayers and Hikaru Genji ends up taking the Akashi Lady and giving her a daughter, the Akashi Princess, who eventually becomes Empress of Japan.
