= Sumiyoshi-ku =

Ward of Osaka, Japan

Coordinates: 34°36′13.23″N 135°30′2.26″E

Location of Sumiyoshi-ku in Osaka City

Sumiyoshi-ku (住吉区) is one of 24 wards of Osaka, Japan. It is located on the southern part of the Uemachi Plateau, in the southernmost part of Osaka City, and is separated from Sakai City's Sakai-ku and Kita-ku by the Yamato River. There are six rail lines, and three main thoroughfares - Abiko-Suji (which run north–south through the centre of the ward), Abeno-Suji (which continues north through the area of Tennoji) and Nagai Koen-Dori, which runs east–west and connects the area with the port to the west. The northern part of Sumiyoshi-ku is a residential area which is a continuation of the southern part of Abeno-ku. The Tezukayama 1-Chome neighbourhood in Abeno-ku, and Tezukayama-naka and Tezukayama-nishi neighbourhoods in Sumiyoshi-ku are upper-class residential areas. South of this, around the Sumiyoshi Grand Shrine, are the Sumiyoshi and Kamisumiyoshi neighbourhoods, home to many long established local families. Surrounding these are the middle-class residential neighbourhoods of Shimizugaoka, Suminoe, Oriono, Dairyo, Minamisumiyoshi, Yamanouchi, and Nagai, which lies at the eastern end of the ward. Sumiyoshi-ku is home to about 157,000 residents, and has a population density of 16,800 people per square kilometer.

== Area history ==
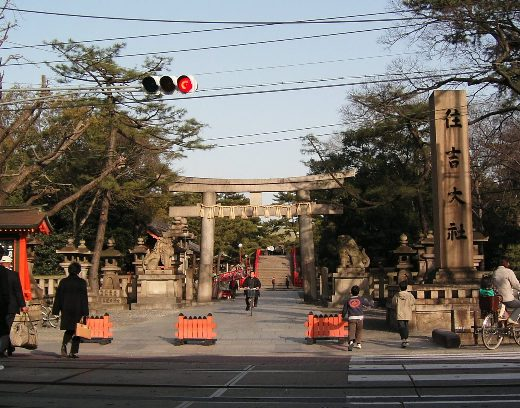
Sumiyoshi Taisha

In ancient times, the kanji combination for the current day Sumiyoshi, 住吉, was pronounced Suminoe, and appeared in Man'yōshū (8th-century Japanese poetry). At present, Sumiyoshi, Suminoe, and Sumie represent different area names.

Suminoe no Tsu (Suminoe Port), which in ancient times was located south of Sumiyoshi Grand Shrine, was home to Japan's first international port, and until Naniwa no Tsu (Naniwa Port) was constructed, it was the country's international point of contact. The Japanese envoy to the Sui and T'ang dynasties of China departed there, and it was also Japan's portal to the Silk Road. Importantly, Buddhism was also introduced to Japan (via China and Korea) through this port.

In the Middle Ages, the throne of Emperor Go-Murakami of the Southern Court was placed in the house of the chief priest of Sumiyoshi Grand Shrine for ten years. It was known as Sumiyoshi-angou (住吉行宮) and was the base of the Southern Court.

There was also a town built around Sumiyoshi Grand Shrine, and until the Meiji period and ensuing land reclamation projects, the sea shore was quite close to the shrine. Sumiyoshi Moyou, a famous picture map showing a Japanese place of scenic beauty (風光明媚な風景) depicts the landscape in the area of the shrine at the time.

In ancient times, the estates of a number of powerful family clans were located in the Tezukayama area. Included among these was the house of the famous Ootomo No Kanamura, who supported Emperor Keitai. Tezukayama Tumulus is the burial site of either Ootomo No Kanamura or one of his children.

== Ward history ==
Sumiyoshi-ku (ward) was originally called Sumiyoshi-gun (district) of the Settsu province. In ancient times the area prospered independently of the central Osaka area.

In 1878, an act was passed for the organization of areas into a county system of gun (district), ku (ward), machi (town) and mura (village/neighbourhood). From this Sumiyoshi-gun (district) was created. The district town hall was built in the only town of the district, Anryuu-machi. In April 1896, a new county system was introduced which resulted in Sumiyoshi-gun being absorbed into Higashinari-gun.

Sumiyoshi-ku was formed in 1925 with the second expansion of Osaka city into an area that was formerly part of the original Sumiyoshi-gun. In 1943, two sections were separated from Sumiyoshi-ku to form Abeno-ku and Higashisumiyoshi-ku. Also, in 1943, part of Nishinari-ku and all of Kohamachi-ku were absorbed into Sumiyoshi-ku. In 1974 Sumiyoshi-ku was further subdivided, resulting in Sumiyoshi Park, Anryuu, and Hamaguchi becoming part of the newly formed Suminoe-ku.

== Places of interest ==
Aside from Sumiyoshi Taisha, there is also a large number of restaurants along Abiko-Suji and in the Nagai area (the intersection of Nagai Koen-Dori and Abiko-Suji), as well as numerous small shops and businesses on Abeno-Suji. Nagai also abuts Nagai Park in neighboring Higashisumiyoshi Ward which includes Nagai Stadium, Nagai Botanical Garden, as well as the Osaka Museum of Natural History.

- Sumiyoshi Grand Shrine
- Tezukayama Tumulus
- Ruins of the palace of Emperor Go-Murakami
- Ikune Shrine
- Oyosami Shrine
- Asazawa Shrine
- Wakamatsu Shrine (also known as Todorokihimenomikoto Shrine)
- Gokurakuji Temple
- Shogon Jodoji Temple
- Statue of a Guardian Deity, Rokudo-no Tsuji Enma Jizo
- Monument to Osho Ikkyu's Hermitage, Shosaian
- Kishu Highway
- Kumano Road
- Abiko Kannon
- Mandai-ike Pond
- Asaka Central Park
- Yamato River
- Hosoe River

== Education ==
- Baekdu Hagwon
- Osaka City University
- Naniwa Junior & Senior High School

== Notable people from Sumiyoshi-ku, Osaka ==
- Keiji Obiki, Japanese professional baseball player
- Kenichi Maeyamada, Japanese composer, lyricist, and musician
- LaSalle Ishii, Japanese TV personality, actor, voice actor, and theater director
- Mami Yamasaki, Japanese gravure idol and actress
- Masaya Onosaka, Japanese voice actor
- Minoru Niihara, Japanese singer
- Mizuki Matsuda, Japanese long-distance runner
- Naoki Matoba, Japanese professional baseball player
- Naoko Kawai, Japanese pop idol, singer-songwriter, and composer
- Ryosuke Ogata, Japanese professional baseball player
- Takashi Kawai, Japanese professional baseball player
