= Sumiyoshi-taisha =

Shinto shrine in Osaka Prefecture, Japan

Sumiyoshi taisha 住吉大社
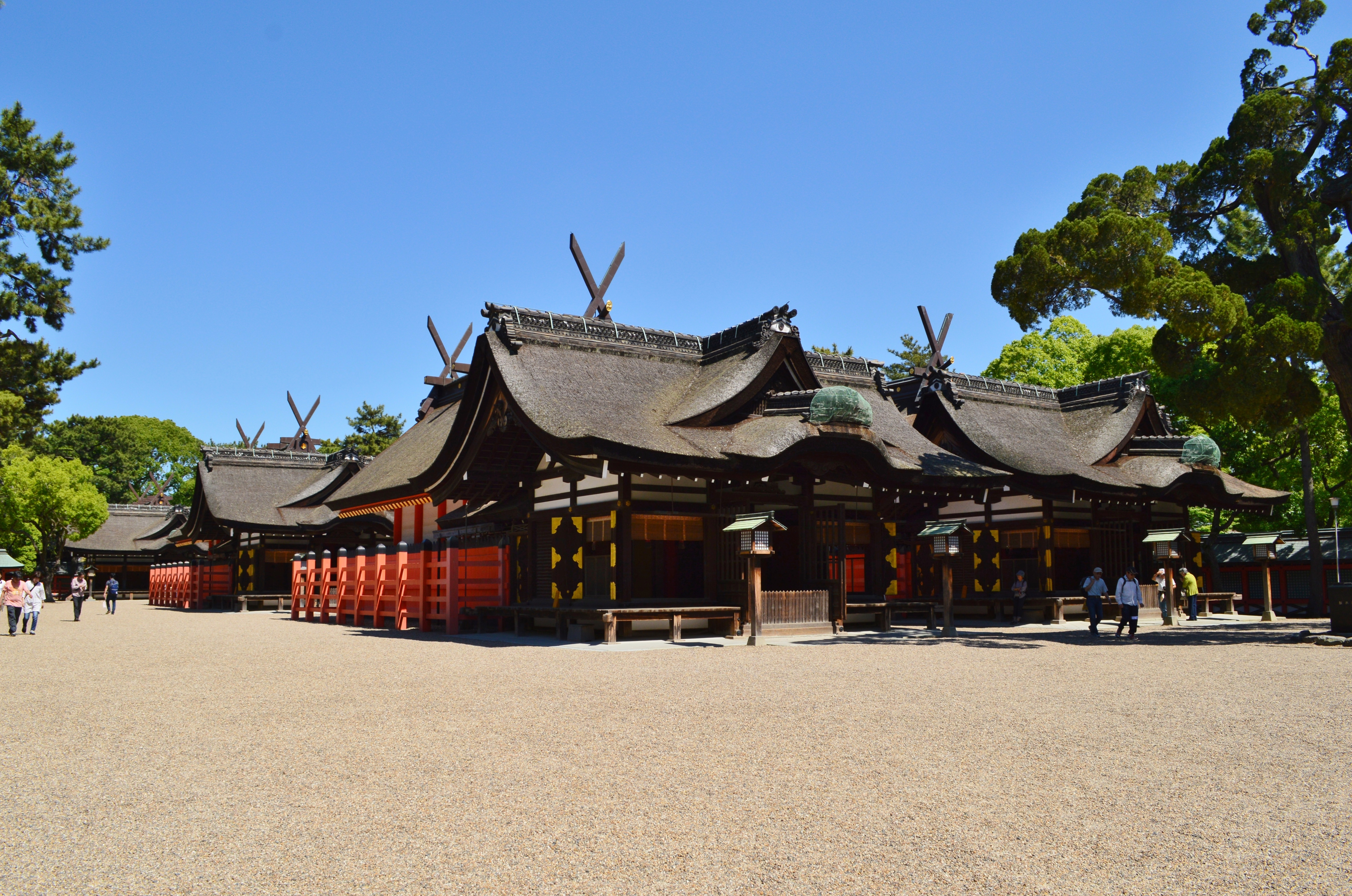
- Sumiyoshi Grand Shrine

- Location within Japan

Religion
- Affiliation: Shinto
- Deity: Sokotsutsu no Onomikoto; Nakatsutsu no Onomikoto; Uwatsutsu no Onomikoto; Okinagatarashi-hime no Mikoto

Location
- Location: 9-89, Sumiyoshi 2-chome, Sumiyoshi-ku, Osaka, Osaka Prefecture 558-0045, Japan
- Interactive map of Sumiyoshi taisha 住吉大社
- Coordinates: 34°36′46.07″N 135°29′34.59″E

Architecture
- Style: Sumiyoshi-zukuri
- Founder: Tamomi no Sukune
- Established: 211

Website
- www.sumiyoshitaisha.net

Sumiyoshi-taisha (住吉大社), also known as Sumiyoshi Grand Shrine, is a Shinto shrine in Sumiyoshi-ku, Osaka, Osaka Prefecture, Japan. It is the main shrine of all the Sumiyoshi shrines. It gives its name to a style of shrine architecture known as Sumiyoshi-zukuri.

The shrine is called Sumiyoshi-san or Sumiyossan by the locals, and is famous for the large crowds that come to the shrine on New Year's Day for hatsumōde. Sumiyoshi taisha enshrines the Sumiyoshi sanjin (Sokotsutsu no Ono-mikoto, Nakatsutsu no Ono-mikoto, and Uwatsutsu no Ono-mikoto) (collectively known as the "Sumiyoshi Ōkami") and Okinagatarashi-hime no Mikoto (Empress Jingū).

== History ==
The shrine became the object of Imperial patronage during the early Heian period. In 965, Emperor Murakami ordered that Imperial messengers were sent to report important events to the guardian kami of Japan. These heihaku were initially presented to 16 shrines including Sumiyoshi.

Sumiyoshi was designated as the chief Shinto shrine (ichinomiya) for the former Settsu Province.

From 1871 through 1946, Sumiyoshi taisha was officially designated one of the Kanpei-taisha (官幣大社), meaning that it stood in the first rank of government supported shrines.

=== Sumiyoshi kami and Empress Jingū ===
Sumiyoshi taisha was founded by Tamomi no Sukune in the 11th year of Empress Jingū's reign (year 211). A member of a powerful family in the area, he was given the clan name of Owari by the empress when she visited the coast of the Gokishichidō (Modern Shichidou in Sakai, Osaka). At the same time, she told him to enshrine the Sumiyoshi sanjin, as she had been told to do so by an oracle from Amaterasu and three Sumiyoshi kami. Later, the Empress herself was also enshrined at Sumiyoshi. The Tsumori clan, whose members have succeeded the position of head priest of Sumiyoshi taisha since the reign of Emperor Ōjin, are the descendants of Tamomi no Sukune's son, Tsumori no Toyoada (or Tsumori no Toyonogodan).

=== Other kami ===
Sumiyoshi taisha is also regarded as the ancestor shrine of Hachiman, the god of war, as the shrine enshrines Empress Jingū, who was the mother of Emperor Ōjin, who was deified as Hachiman. Therefore, the shrine is guardian of the Kawachi bloodline of the Minamoto clan. Also, Hachiman is the god of war on land, and the Sumiyoshi gods are the gods of war on the sea. Later, Sumiyoshi-taisha became one of the three kami of waka.

=== Yamato Diplomacy and the Silk Road ===
Sumiyoshi-taisha is a shrine with connections to the ancient Yamato royalty's diplomacy and sailing, protecting the Imperial embassies to China. As the head priests, the Tsumori clan also boarded these embassy ships. The embassies departed from Suminoe no Tsu, a port on the Hosoe-gawa (also known as Hosoi-gawa. Known as Suminoe no Hosoe in ancient times), a river located to the south of the shrine. Suminoe no Tsu is the oldest international port in Japan, and was opened by Emperor Nintoku. It was the Silk Road's entrance into Japan.

=== Cultural references ===
Although Sumiyoshi taisha is currently completely landlocked, until the Edo period, the shrine riding grounds (currently Sumiyoshi Park) faced the sea and were considered the representative of the beautiful "hakushaseishou" (white sand and green pines) landscape. So much so that this type of scenery in designs and art is known as the Sumiyoshi design.

In Murasaki Shikibu's The Tale of Genji, the shrine is used as an important stage in some chapters concerning the Akashi Lady.

In the folktale "Issun-bōshi", an old couple who had no children prayed at Sumiyoshi taisha. Their prayers were granted. When their child went on a voyage, he departed at Sumiyoshi harbor, sailed down Hosoe-gawa to Osaka Bay, sailed up the Yodo River, and entered Kyoto.

== Notable architecture ==
The honden is built in the Sumiyoshi-zukuri style and has been designated a national treasure on the grounds that it is the oldest example of this style of architecture.

There is an okichigi (置千木) a forked finial, on the roof of the main shrine, as well as 5 square katsuogi (堅魚木), billets placed horizontally along the length of the roof. There are no corridors around the sanctuary. It is surrounded by a plank tamagaki fence (玉垣), which is further surrounded by an ara-imi fence (荒忌垣).

The pillars are round, and stand on stone foundations. The planks between the pillars are horizontal. The area seen from front is the nave, and beyond is the inner shrine and second room.

One of the stone torii at the shrine, just south of the honden, is known as the Kakutorii (角鳥居). It is unusual in that the middle bar does not extend outside of the vertical posts, and all pieces have square edges. This type of torii is called Sumiyoshi torii after the shrine.

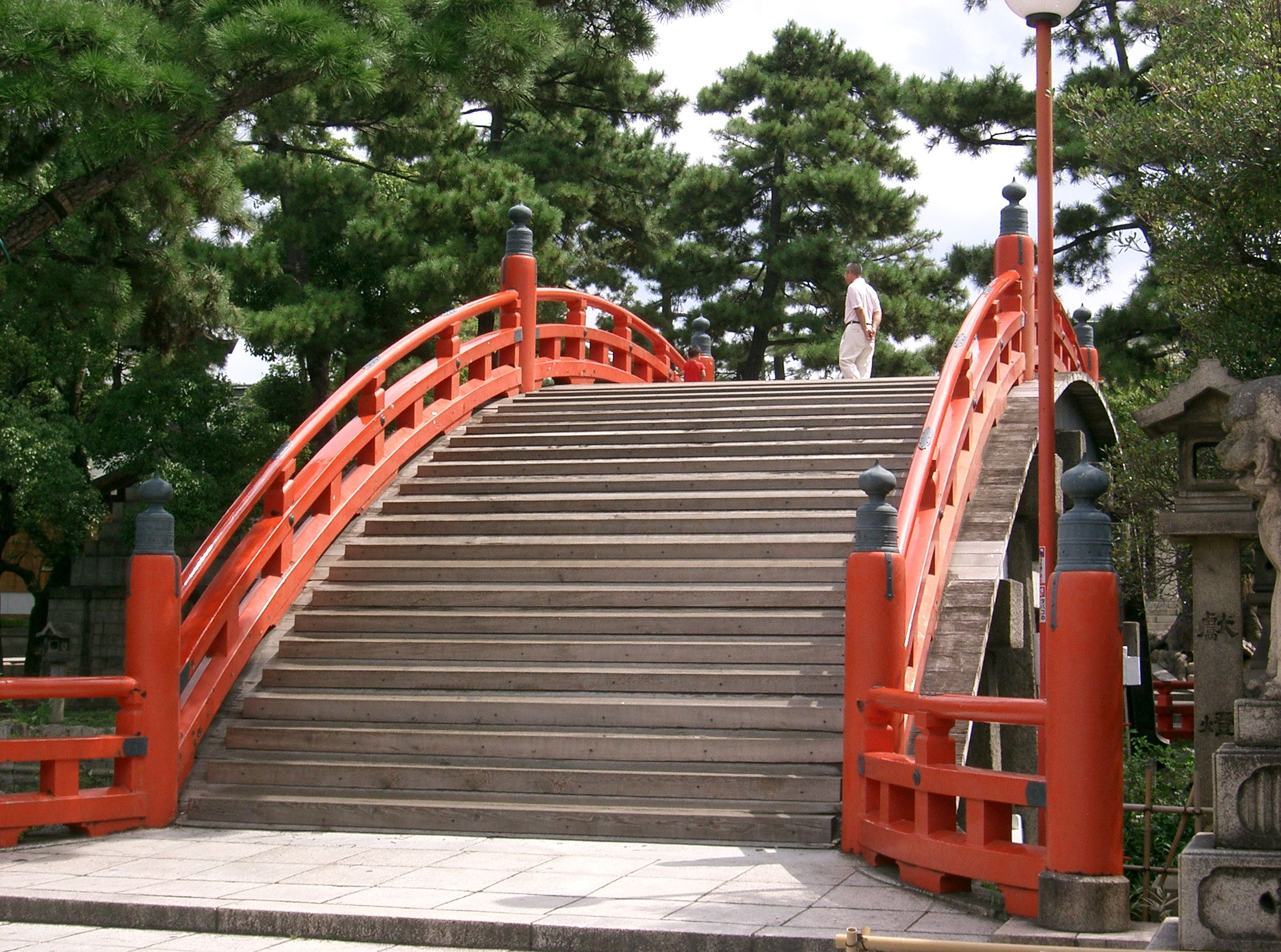
The Taiko bashi at Sumiyoshi-taisha

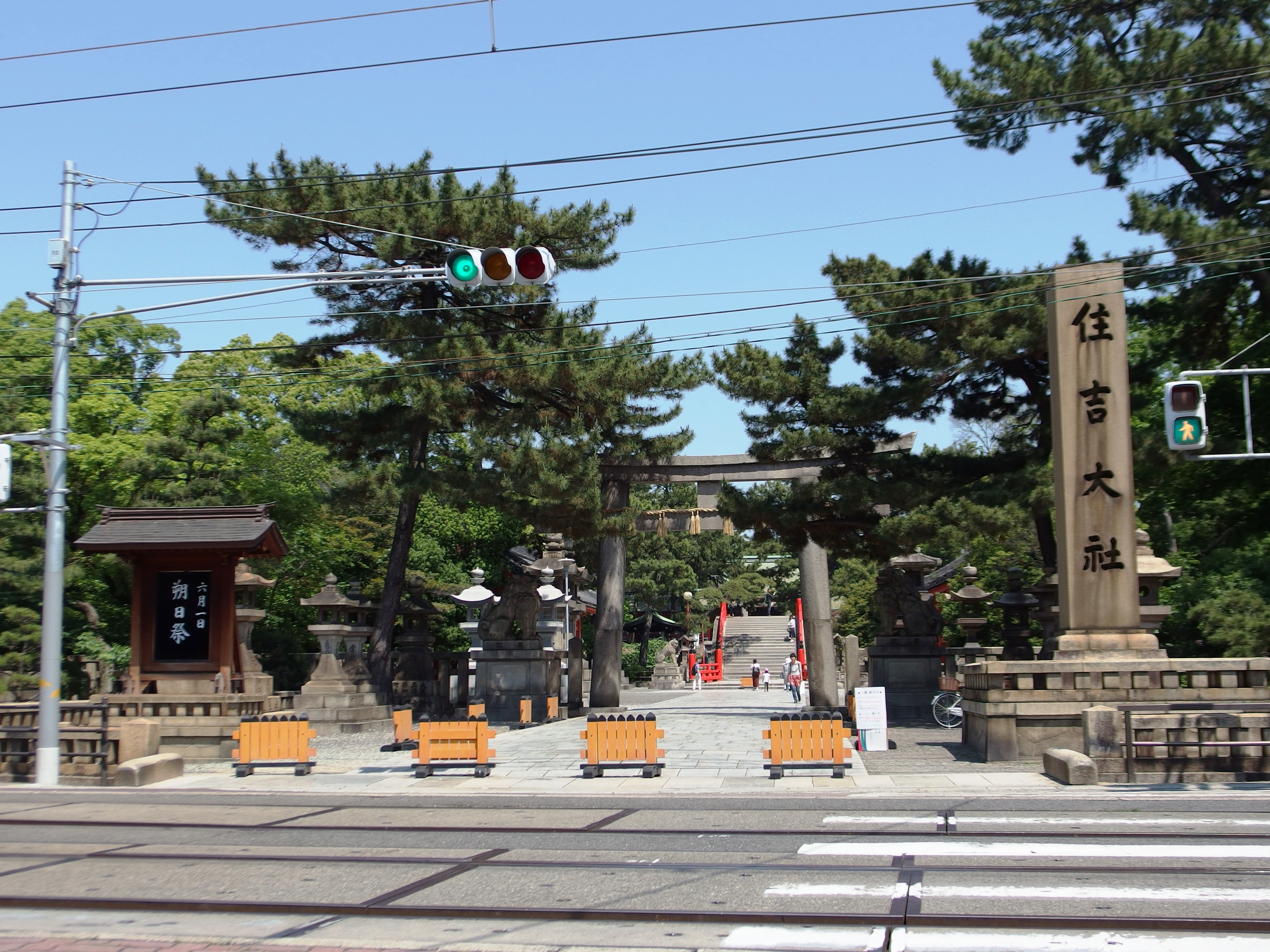
Proper entrance to Sumiyoshi taisha

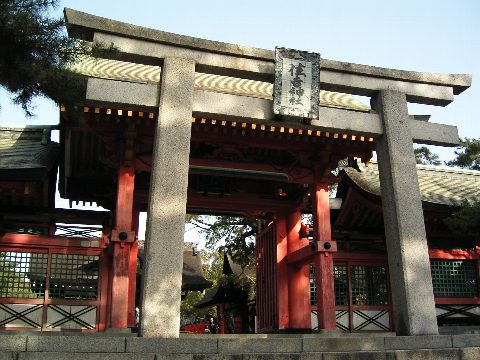
Rear entrance to Sumiyoshi taisha

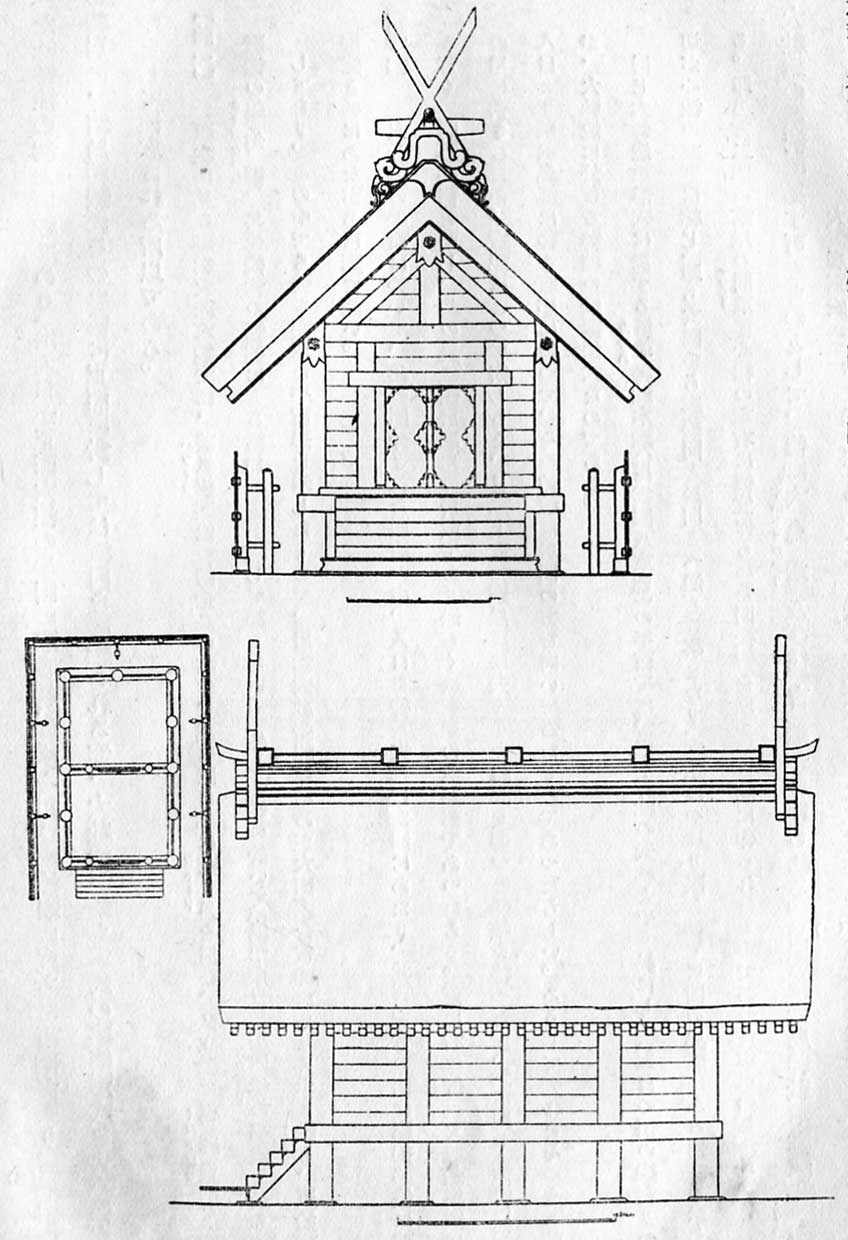
Illustration of main shrine architecture

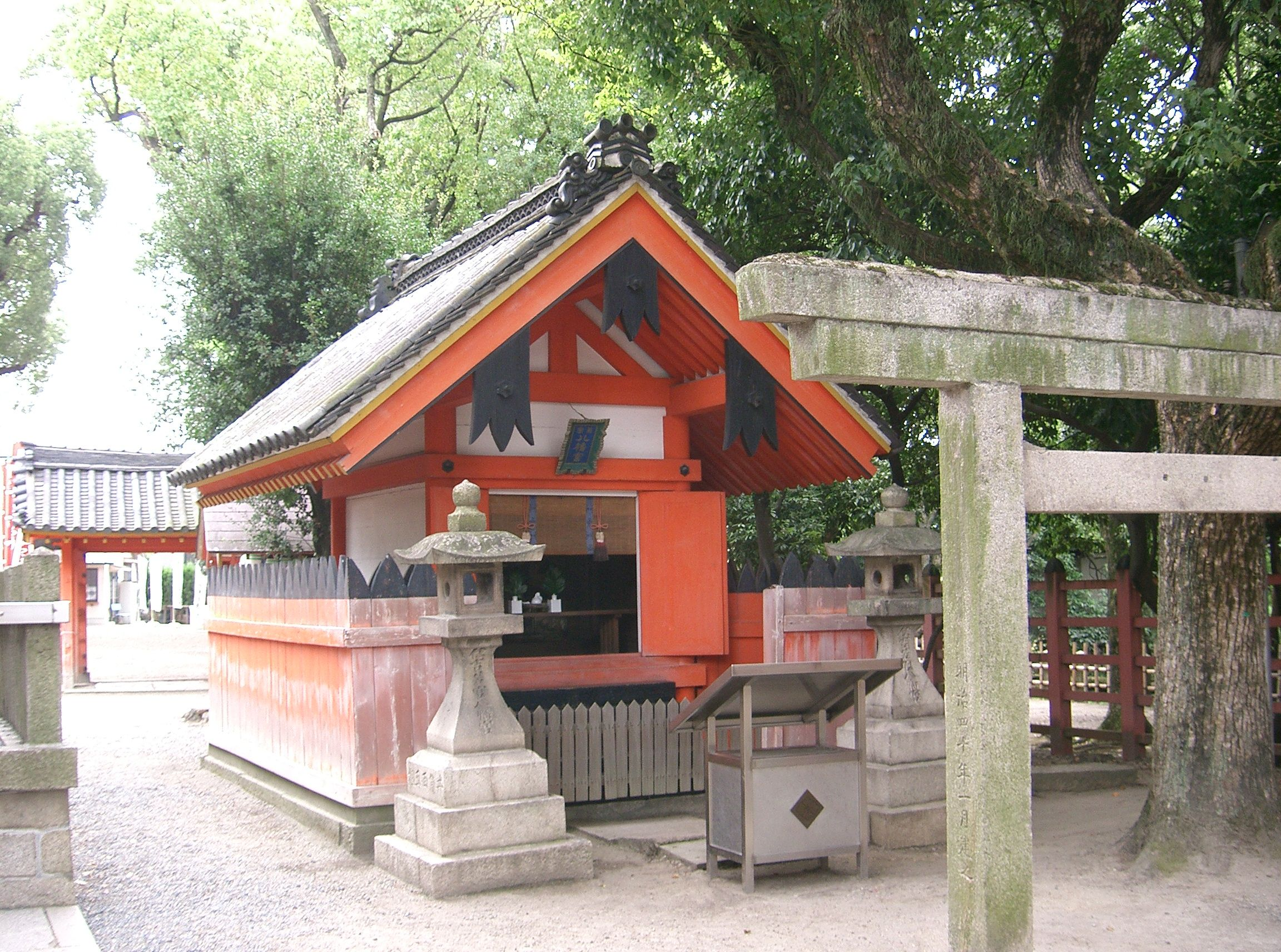
One of Sumiyoshi Taisha's kaku-torii

== See also ==
- List of Shinto shrines
- Twenty-Two Shrines
- Modern system of ranked Shinto Shrines
