= Miyukitsuji Station =

Railway station in Hashimoto, Wakayama Prefecture, Japan

Miyukitsuji Station 御幸辻駅
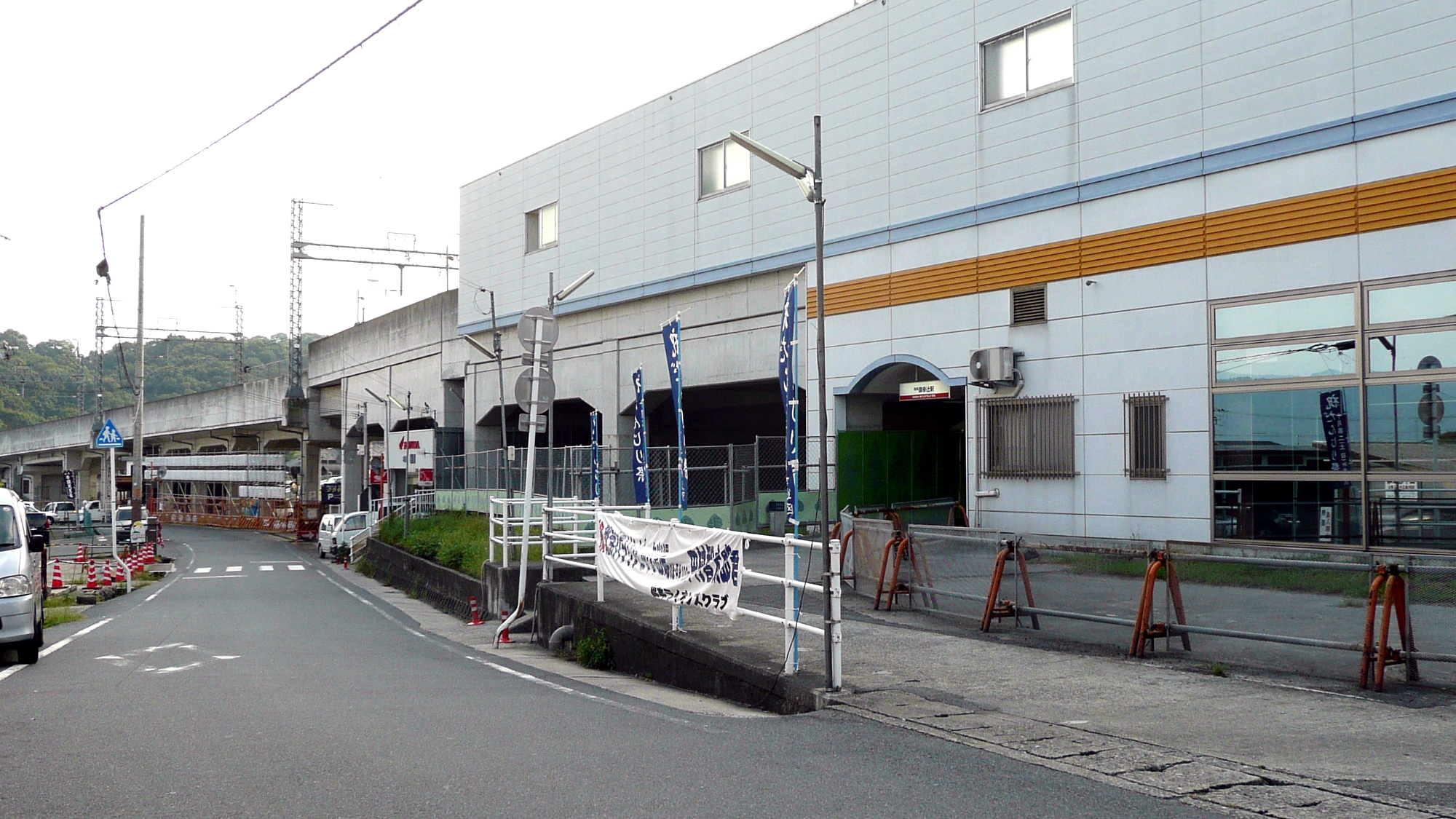
- Miyukitsuji Station East exit

General information
- Location: 567-1, Miyukitsuji, Hashimoto-shi, Wakayama-ken 648-0096; Japan
- Coordinates: 34°20′15.8″N 135°36′7.7″E
- Operator: Nankai Electric Railway
- Line: Nankai Kōya Line
- Distance: 41.9 km (26.0 miles) from Shiomibashi
- Platforms: 2 side platforms
- Connections

Other information
- Status: Unstaffed
- Station code: NK76
- Website: Official website

History
- Opened: 11 March 1915
- Former names: Kōyatsuji (until 1923)

Passengers
- FY2019: 2760 daily
Location
- Location within Wakayama Prefecture Location within Japan

Miyukitsuji Station (御幸辻駅, Miyukitsuji-eki) is a passenger railway station in the city of Hashimoto, Wakayama Prefecture, Japan, operated by the private railway company Nankai Electric Railway.

== Lines ==
Miyukitsuji Station is served by the Nankai Kōya Line, and is located 41.9 kilometers from the terminus of the line at Shiomibashi Station and 41.2 kilometers from Namba Station.

== Station layout ==
The station consists of two elevated opposed side platforms with the station building underneath. The platform can accommodate 8 carriages. The station is unattended.

=== Platforms ===
1	■ Nankai Kōya Line	for Kōyasan
2	■ Nankai Kōya Line	for Nanba

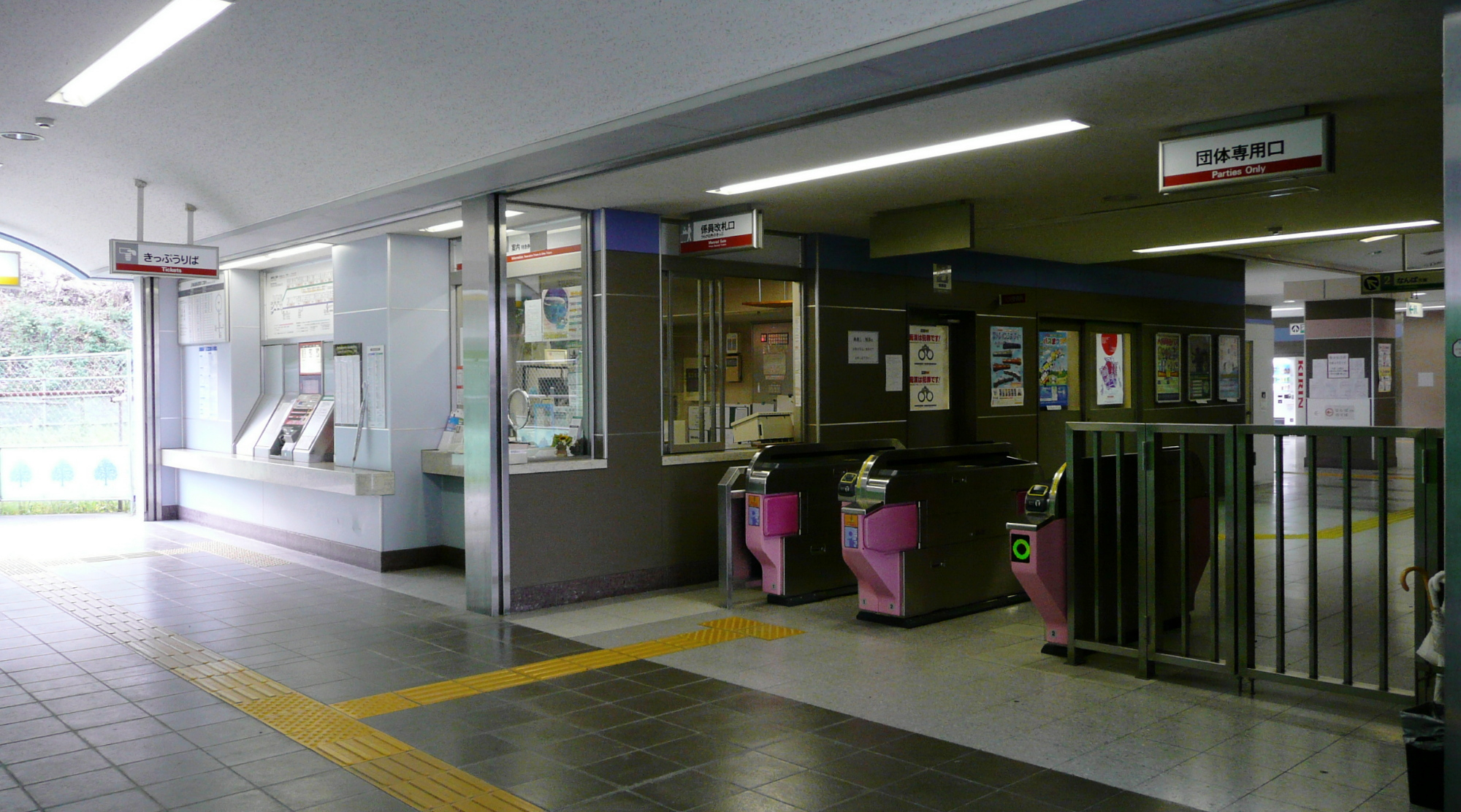
Ticket gates

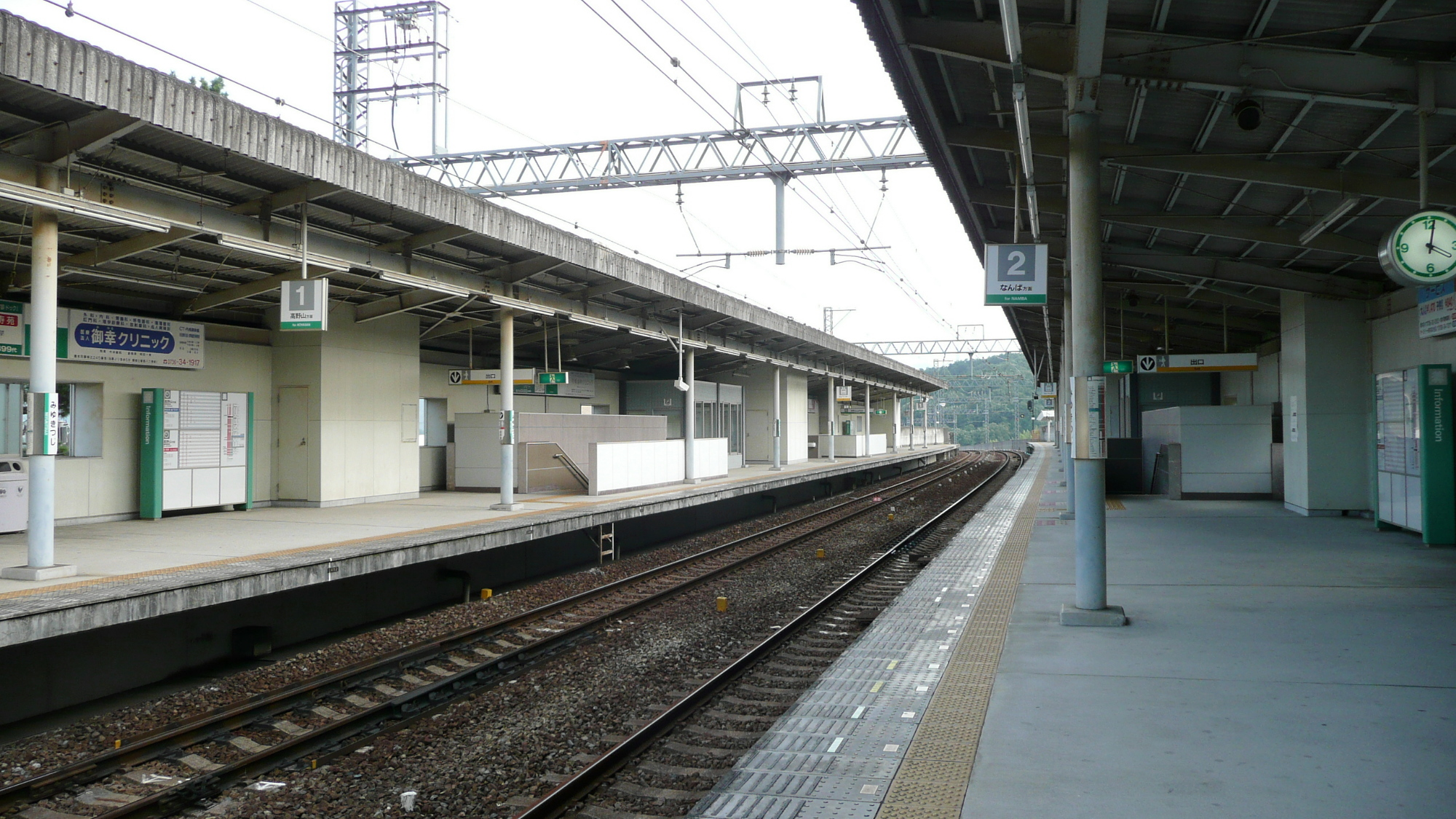
Platform

== Adjacent stations ==
«	Service	»
Nankai Electric Railway Koya Line
Limited Express "Koya", "Rinkan": Does not stop at this station
Rinkanden'entoshi	Rapid Express	Hashimoto
Rinkanden'entoshi	Express	Hashimoto
Rinkanden'entoshi	Sub Express	Hashimoto
Rinkanden'entoshi	Local	Hashimoto

== History ==
Miyukitsuji Station opened on March 11, 1915 on the Takano Mountain Railway as Kōyatsuji Station (野辻駅). The line was renamed the Osaka Takano Railway on April 30 of the same year, and part of the Nankai Railway network through mergers in 1922. The station was renamed to its present name on April 21, 1923. The Nankai Railway was merged into the Kintetsu group in 1944 by orders of the Japanese government, and reemerged as the Nankai Railway Company in 1947. The tracks were elevated in 1992 and then new station building was complete din 1995.

== Passenger statistics ==
In fiscal 2019, the station was used by an average of 2760 passengers daily (boarding passengers only).

== Surrounding area ==
- Satsukidai (Hashimoto Garden Town Satsukidai)
- Hashimoto City Kimi Elementary School

== See also ==
- List of railway stations in Japan
