= Chihayaguchi Station =

Railway station in Kawachinagano, Osaka Prefecture, Japan

Chihayaguchi Station 千早口駅
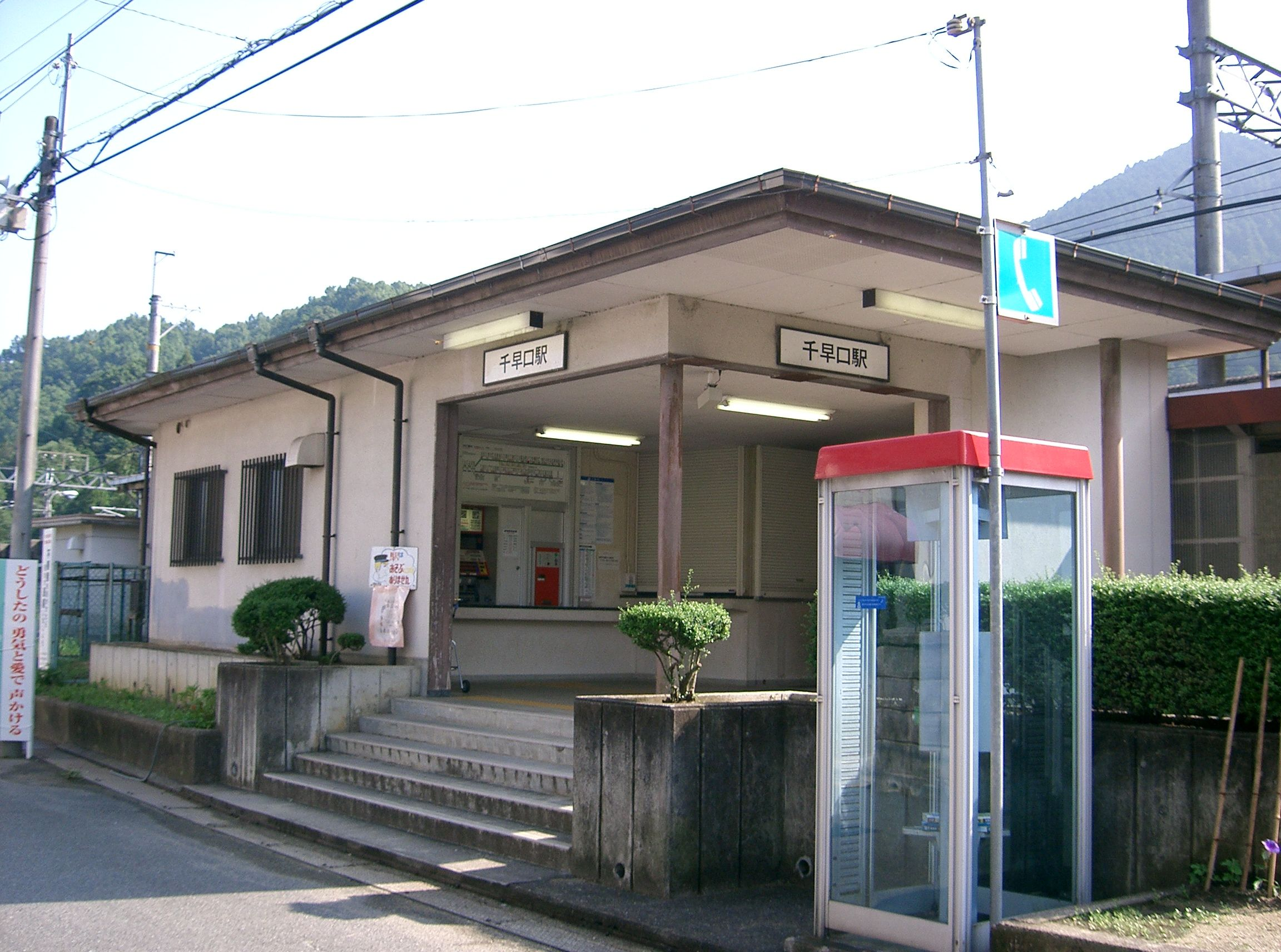
- Chihayaguchi Station, August 2007

General information
- Location: 1343, Iwase, Kawachinagano-shi, Osaka-fu 586-0061; Japan
- Coordinates: 34°24′42.1″N 135°35′23.8″E
- Operator: Nankai Electric Railway
- Line: Koya Line
- Distance: 33.1 km from Shiomibashi
- Platforms: 2 side platforms
- Connections: Bus terminal

Other information
- Station code: NK72
- Website: Official website

History
- Opened: March 11, 1915

Passengers
- 2019: 216 daily
Location
- Location within Osaka Prefecture Location within Japan

Chihayaguchi Station (千早口駅, Chihayaguchi-eki) is a passenger railway station located in the city of Ōsakasayama, Osaka Prefecture, Japan, operated by the private railway operator Nankai Electric Railway. It has the station number "NK72".

== Lines ==
Sayama Station is served by the Nankai Koya Line, and is 33.1 kilometers from the terminus of the line at Shiomibashi and 32.5 kilometers from Nanba.

== Layout ==
The station consists of two ground-level opposed side platforms connected by an underground passage.

=== Platforms ===
| 1 | ■ Southbound | for Hashimoto and Kōyasan |
| 2 | ■ Northbound | for Sakaihigashi, Shin-Imamiya and Namba |

== Adjacent stations ==
| « | Service | » |
Nankai Electric Railway Koya Line
Limited Express "Koya" (特急こうや); Limited Express "Rinkan" (特急りんかん): Does not stop at this station
Rapid Express (快速急行): Does not stop at this station
| Mikanodai | Express (急行) | Amami |
| Mikanodai | Sub Express (区間急行) | Amami |
| Mikanodai | Local (各駅停車) | Amami |

== History ==
Chihayaguchi Station opened on March 11, 1915.

== Passenger statistics ==
In fiscal 2019, the station was used by an average of 216 passengers daily.

== Surrounding area ==
- Amami Post Office

== See also ==
- List of railway stations in Japan
