= Rinkanden-entoshi Station =

Railway station in Hashimoto, Wakayama Prefecture, Japan

Rinkanden-entoshi Station 林間田園都市駅
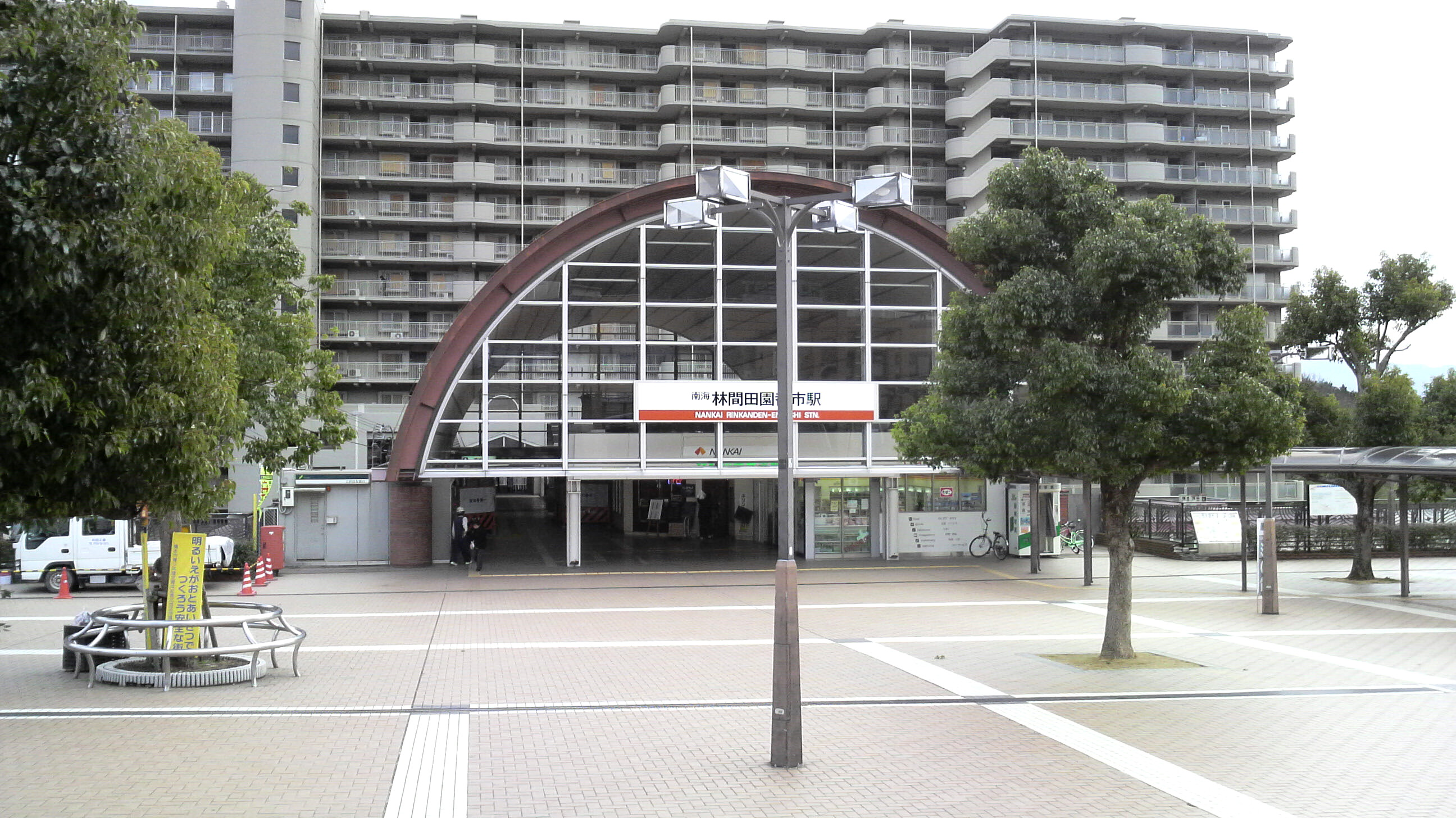
- Station building

General information
- Location: 1-1-1, Mitsuishidai, Hashimoto-shi, Wakayama-ken 648-0094; Japan
- Coordinates: 34°21′20.7″N 135°36′12.3″E
- Operator: Nankai Electric Railway
- Line: Nankai Kōya Line
- Distance: 39.9 km (24.8 miles) from Shiomibashi
- Platforms: 1 side + 1 island platform
- Connections

Other information
- Status: Staffed
- Station code: NK75
- Website: Official website

History
- Opened: 22 November 1981

Passengers
- FY2019: 7945 daily
Location
- Location within Wakayama Prefecture Location within Japan

Rinkanden-entoshi Station (林間田園都市駅, Rinkanden-entoshi-eki) is a passenger railway station in the city of Hashimoto, Wakayama Prefecture, Japan, operated by the private railway company Nankai Electric Railway.

== Lines ==
Rinkanden-entoshi Station is served by the Nankai Kōya Line, and is located 39.9 kilometers from the terminus of the line at Shiomibashi Station and 39.2 kilometers from Namba Station.

== Station layout ==
The station consists of one island platform and one side platform connected by an elevated station building. The Namba-bound platform has space for a fourth track on the outer side, which is fenced. The station is staffed.

=== Platforms ===
1, 2	■ Nankai Kōya Line	for Kōyasan
3	■ Nankai Kōya Line	for Namba

== Adjacent stations ==
«	Service	»
Nankai Electric Railway Koya Line
Kawachinagano	Limited Express "Koya"/"Rinkan" (特急「こうや」/「りんかん」)	Hashimoto
Mikanodai	Rapid Express (快速急行)	Miyukitsuji
Kimitōge	Express (急行)	Miyukitsuji
Kimitōge	Sub. Express (区間急行)	Terminus
Kimitōge	Local (各駅停車)	Miyukitsuji

== History ==
Rinkanden-entoshi Station opened on November 22, 1981.

== Passenger statistics ==
In fiscal 2019, the station was used by an average of 7945 passengers daily (boarding passengers only).

== Surrounding area ==
- Nankai Hashimoto Rinkan Den'en-toshi New City
- Kimi Kita Junior High School
- Kimi Higashi Junior High School

== See also ==
- List of railway stations in Japan
