= Amami Station =

Railway station in Kawachinagano, Osaka Prefecture, Japan

Amami Station 天見駅
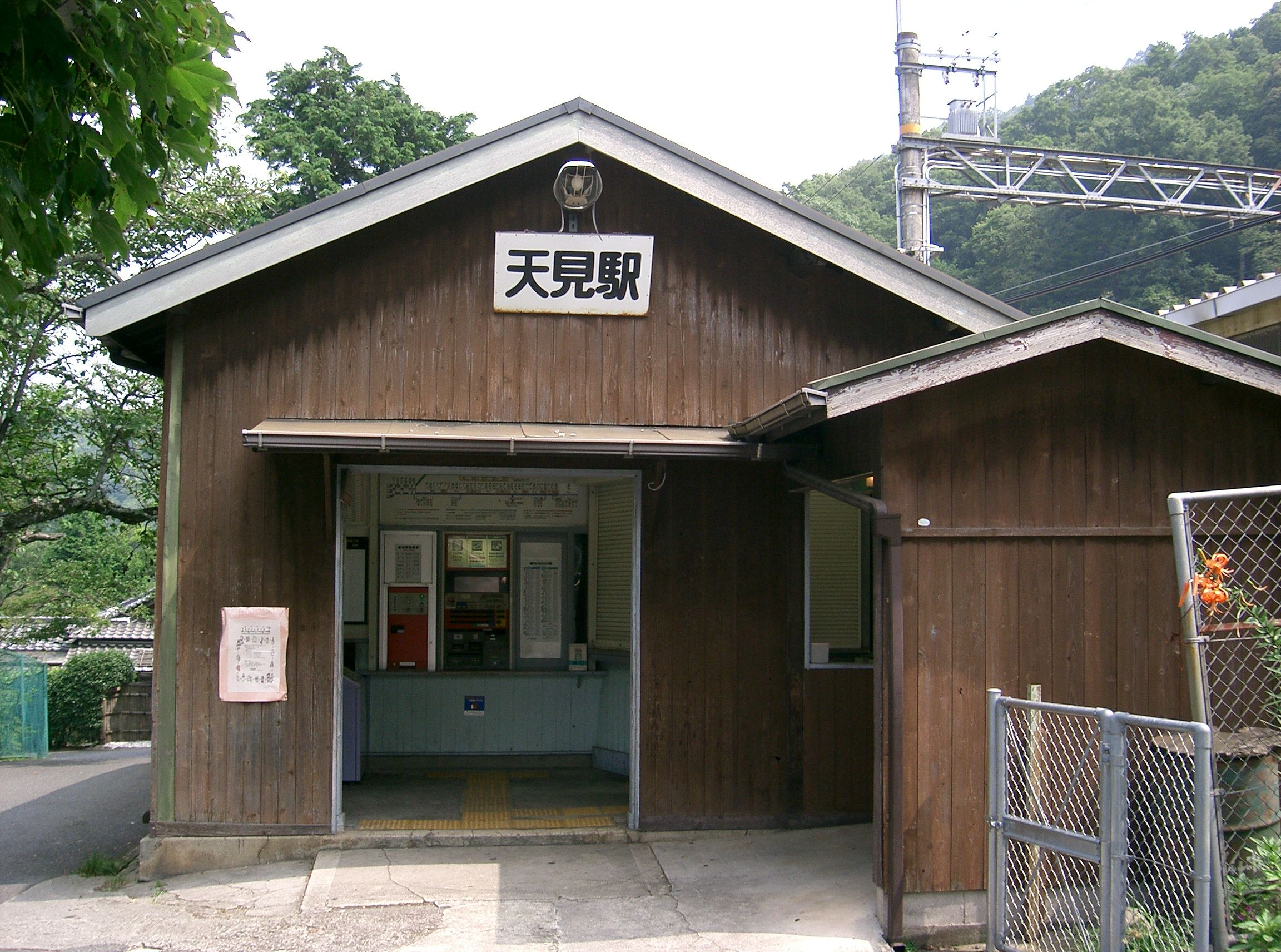
- Amami Station, July 2007

General information
- Location: 195-1, Amami, Kawachinagano-shi, Osaka-fu 586-0062; Japan
- Coordinates: 34°23′48.5″N 135°35′43.3″E
- Operator: Nankai Electric Railway
- Line: Koya Line
- Distance: 34.9 km from Shiomibashi
- Platforms: 2 side platforms
- Connections: Bus terminal

Other information
- Station code: NK73
- Website: Official website

History
- Opened: March 11, 1915

Passengers
- 2019: 335 daily
Location
- Location within Osaka Prefecture Location within Japan

Amami Station (天見駅, Amami-eki) is a passenger railway station located in the city of Kawachinagano, Osaka Prefecture, Japan, operated by the private railway operator Nankai Electric Railway. It has the station number "NK73".

== Lines ==
Amami Station is served by the Nankai Koya Line, and is 34.9 kilometers from the terminus of the line at Shiomibashi and 34.2 kilometers from Nanba.

== Layout ==
The station consists of two ground-level opposed side platforms connected by an underground passage.

=== Platforms ===
1	■ Kōya Line	southbound for Hashimoto and Kōyasan
2	■ Kōya Line	northbound for Sakaihigashi, Shin-Imamiya and Namba

== Adjacent stations ==
«	Service	»
Nankai Electric Railway Koya Line
Limited Express "Koya" (特急こうや); Limited Express "Rinkan" (特急りんかん): Does not stop at this station
Rapid Express (快速急行): Does not stop at this station
Chihayaguchi	Express (急行)	Kimitōge
Chihayaguchi	Sub Express (区間急行)	Kimitōge
Chihayaguchi	Local (各駅停車)	Kimitōge

== History ==
Amami Station opened on March 11, 1915.

== Passenger statistics ==
In fiscal 2019, the station was used by an average of 335 passengers daily.

== Surrounding area ==
- Amami Onsen Nantenen
- Mt. Iwawaki
- Kawachinagano City Amami Elementary School

== See also ==
- List of railway stations in Japan
