= Mikanodai Station =

Railway station in Kawachinagano, Osaka Prefecture, Japan

Mikanodai Station 美加の台駅
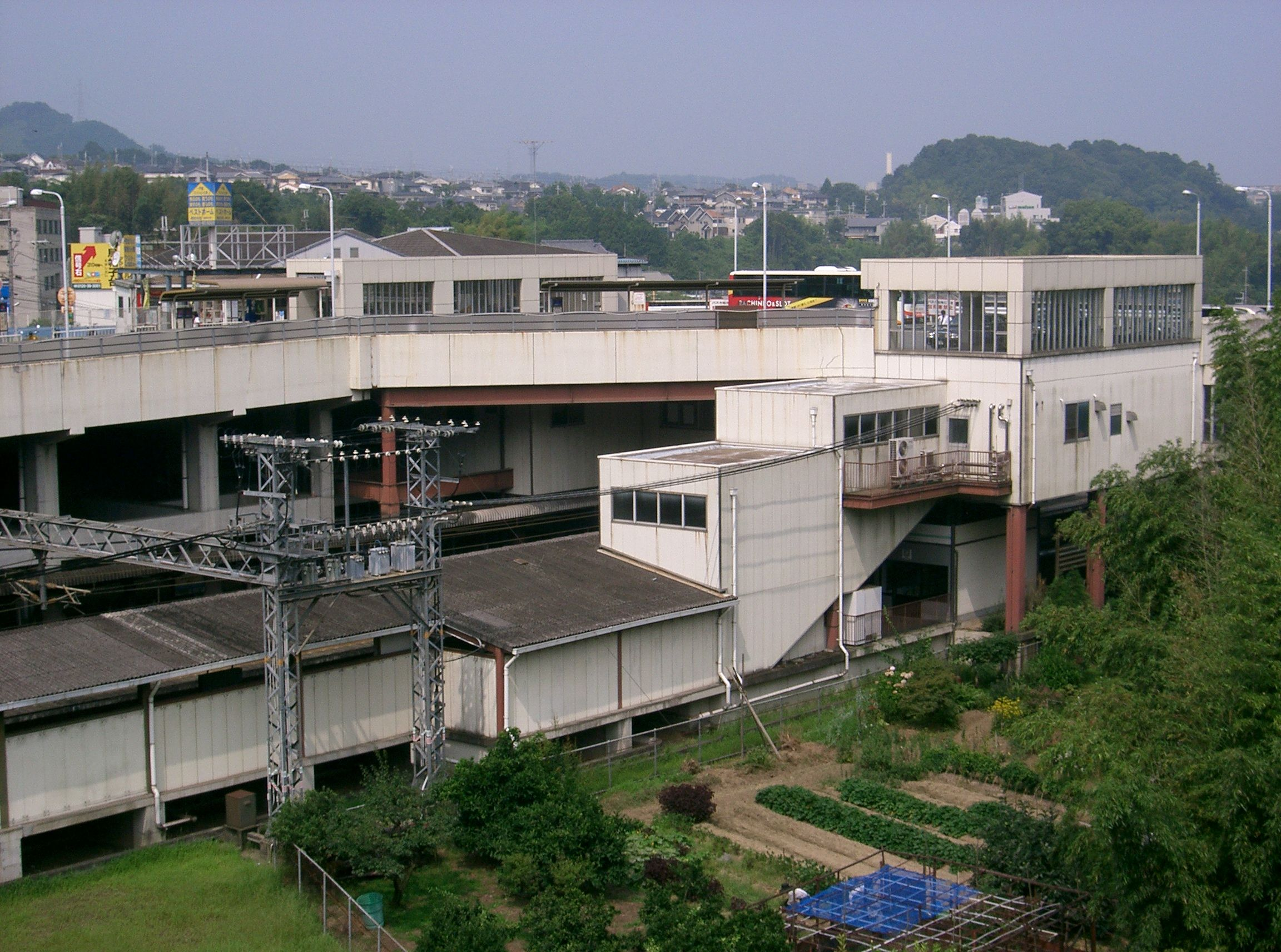
- Mikanodai Station in July 2007

General information
- Location: 191-1, Ishibotoke, Kawachinagano-shi, Osaka-fu 586-0069; Japan
- Coordinates: 34°25′28.7″N 135°34′38.6″E
- Operator: Nankai Electric Railway
- Line: Koya Line
- Distance: 31.3 km from Shiomibashi
- Platforms: 2 side platforms
- Connections: Bus terminal

Other information
- Station code: NK71
- Website: Official website

History
- Opened: September 1, 1984

Passengers
- 2019: 3.659 daily
Location
- Location within Osaka Prefecture Location within Japan

Mikanodai Station (美加の台駅, Mikanodai-eki) is a passenger railway station located in the city of Kawachinagano, Osaka Prefecture, Japan, operated by the private railway operator Nankai Electric Railway. It has the station number "NK71".

== Lines ==
Mikanodai Station is served by the Nankai Koya Line, and is 31.3 kilometers from the terminus of the line at Shiomibashi and 30.6 kilometers from Nanba.

== Layout ==
The station consists of two ground-level opposed side platforms connected by an elevated station building.

=== Platforms ===
1	■ Southbound	for Hashimoto and Kōyasan
2	■ Northbound	for Sakaihigashi, Shin-Imamiya and Namba

== Adjacent stations ==
«	Service	»
Nankai Electric Railway Koya Line
Limited Express "Koya" (特急こうや); Limited Express "Rinkan" (特急りんかん): Does not stop at this station
Mikkaichichō	Rapid Express (快速急行)	Rinkanden'entoshi
Mikkaichichō	Express (急行)	Chihayaguchi
Mikkaichichō	Sub Express (区間急行)	Chihayaguchi
Mikkaichichō	Local (各駅停車)	Chihayaguchi

== History ==
Mikanodai Station opened on September 1, 1984.

== Passenger statistics ==
In fiscal 2019, the station was used by an average of 3,659 passengers daily.

== Surrounding area ==
- Nankai Mikanodai New Town

== See also ==
- List of railway stations in Japan
