= Mikkaichichō Station =

Railway station in Kawachinagano, Osaka Prefecture, Japan

Mikkaichichō Station 三日市町駅
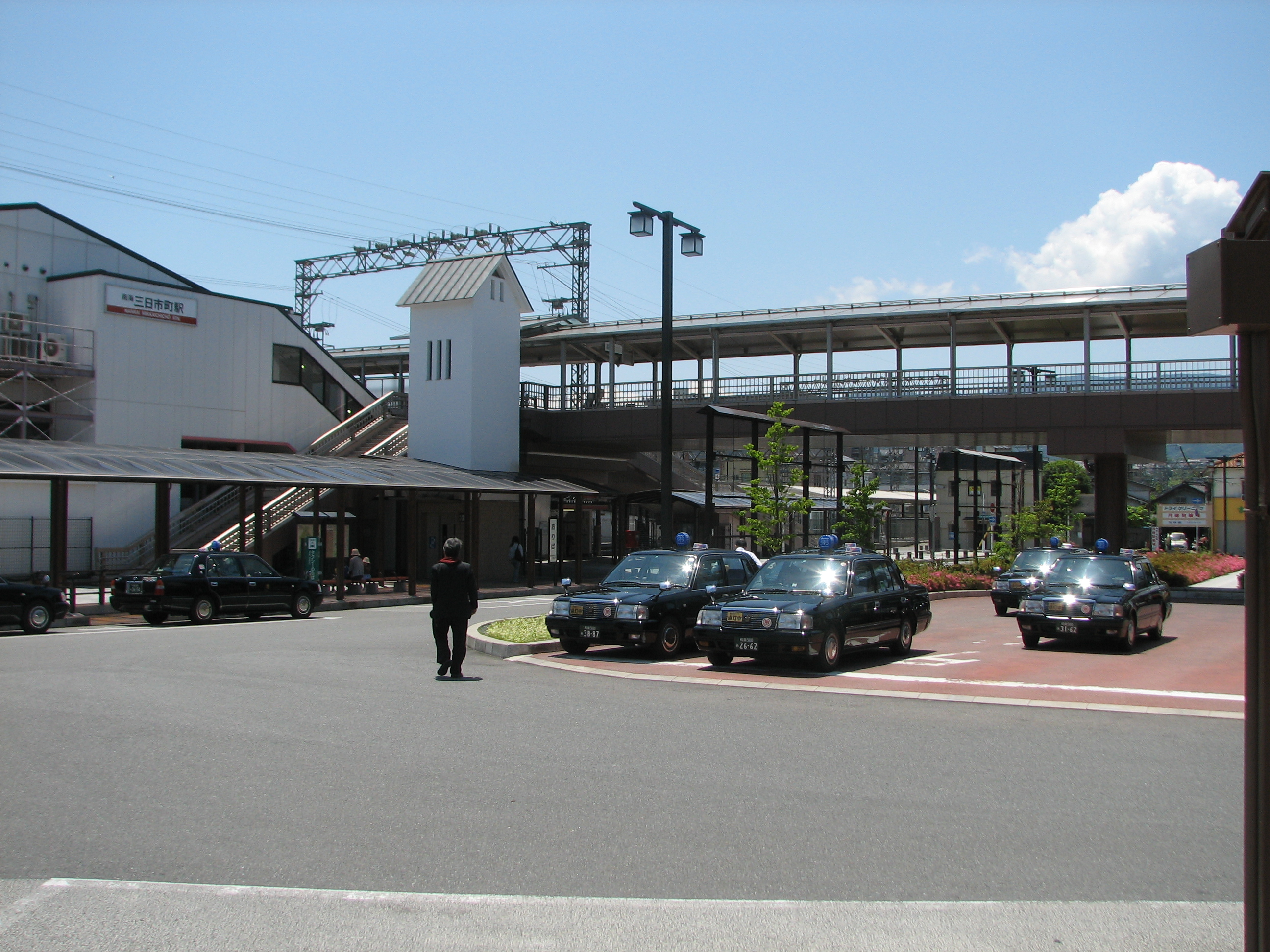
- Mikkaichichō Station in May 2010

General information
- Location: 1125, Mikkaichichō, Kawachinagano-shi, Osaka-fu 586-0048; Japan
- Coordinates: 34°26′12.2″N 135°34′16.8″E
- Operator: Nankai Electric Railway
- Line: Koya Line
- Distance: 29.7 km from Shiomibashi
- Platforms: 2 side platforms
- Connections: Bus terminal

Other information
- Station code: NK70
- Website: Official website

History
- Opened: October 21, 1914

Passengers
- 2019: 14,454 daily
Location
- Location within Osaka Prefecture Location within Japan

Mikkaichichō Station (三日市町駅, Mikkaichichō-eki) is a passenger railway station located in the city of Kawachinagano, Osaka Prefecture, Japan, operated by the private railway operator Nankai Electric Railway. It has the station number "NK70".

== Lines ==
Mikkaichichō Station is served by the Nankai Koya Line, and is 29.7 kilometers from the terminus of the line at Shiomibashi and 29.0 kilometers from Nanba.

== Layout ==
The station consists of two ground-level opposed side platforms connected by an elevated station building.There is one Y linear lapel line in the south of the station.

=== Platforms ===
1	■ Koya Line	for Kōyasan
2	■ Koya Line	for Namba

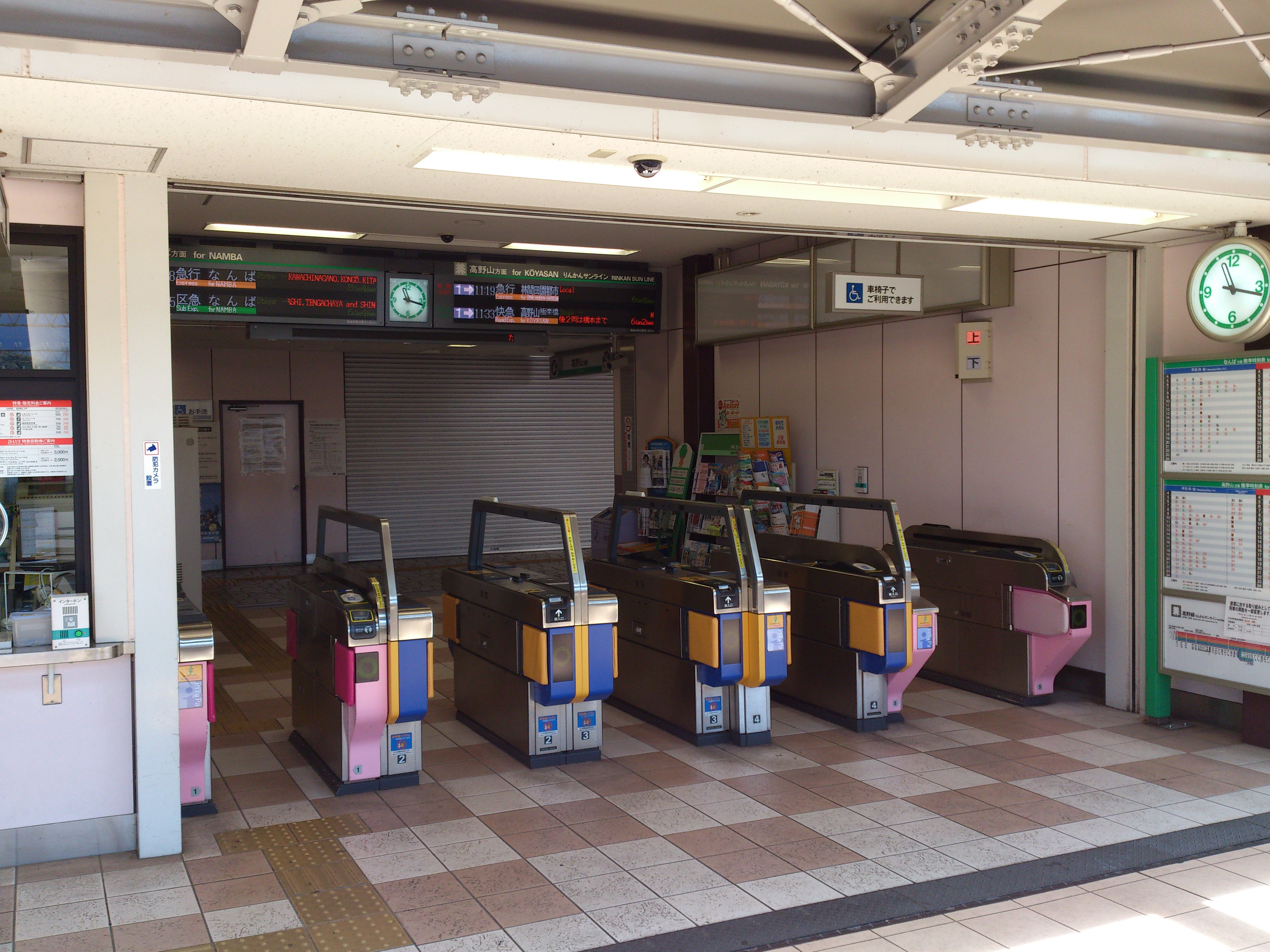
2F Ticket gates

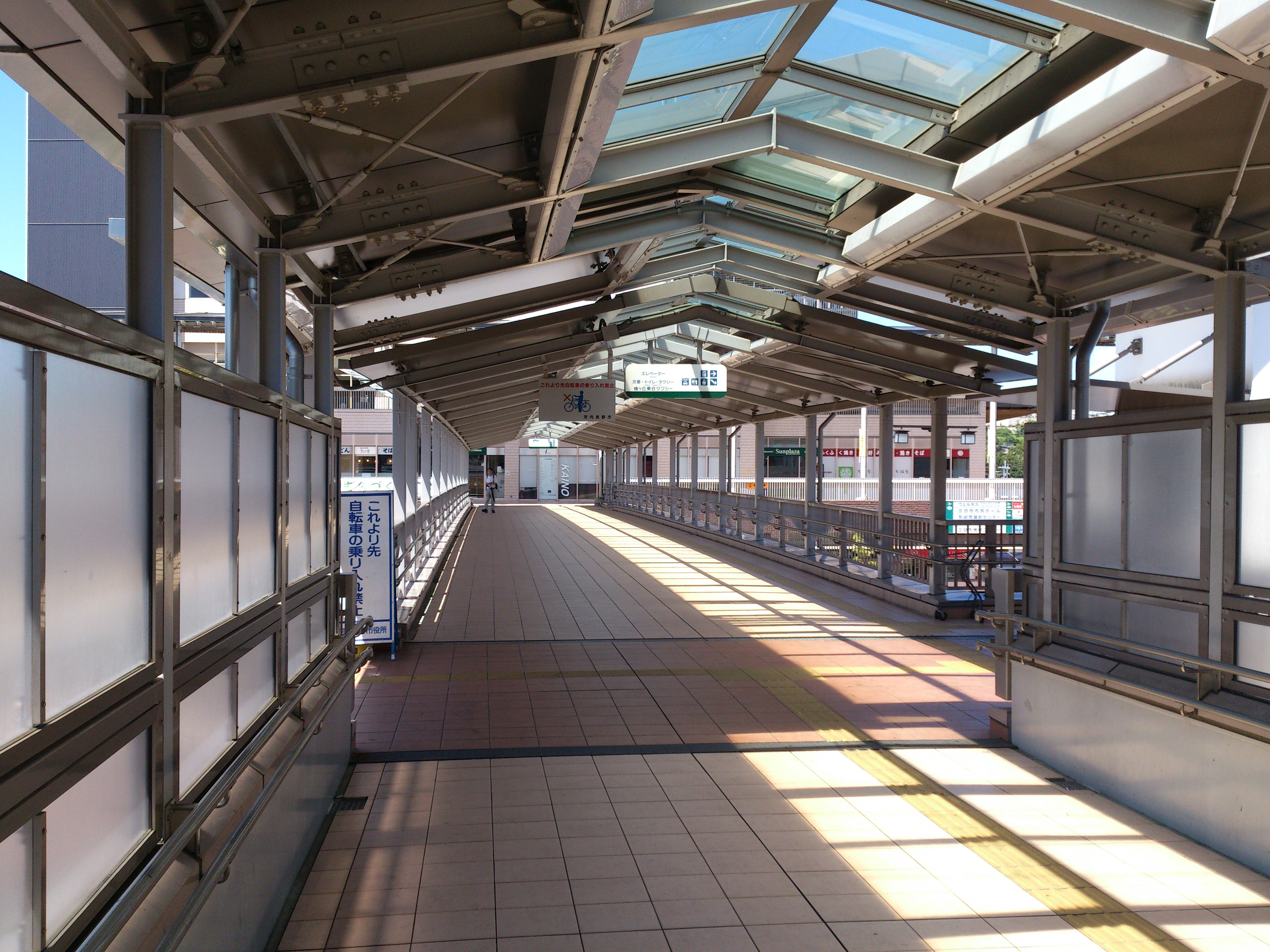
Accessway

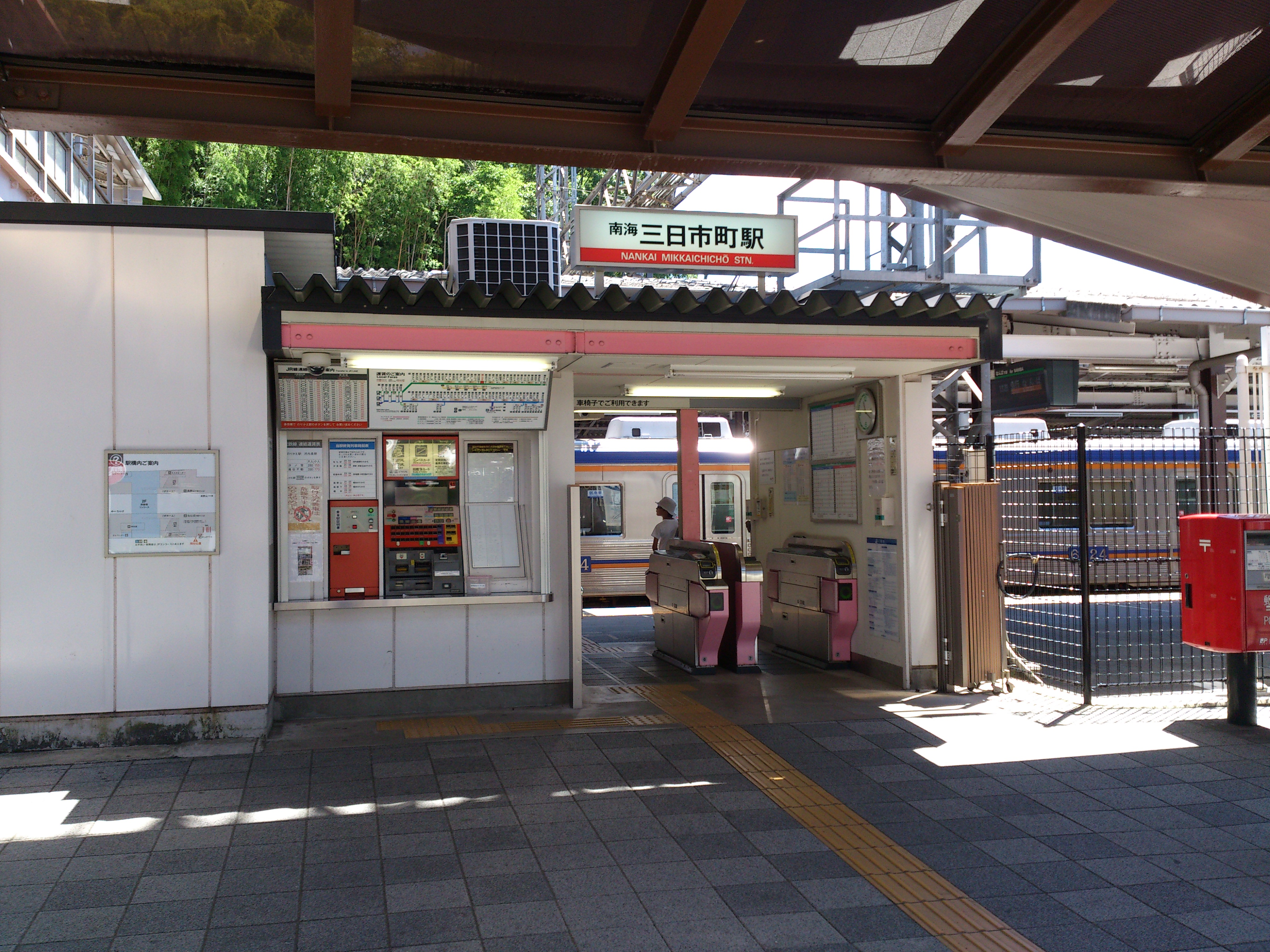
1F Ticket gates

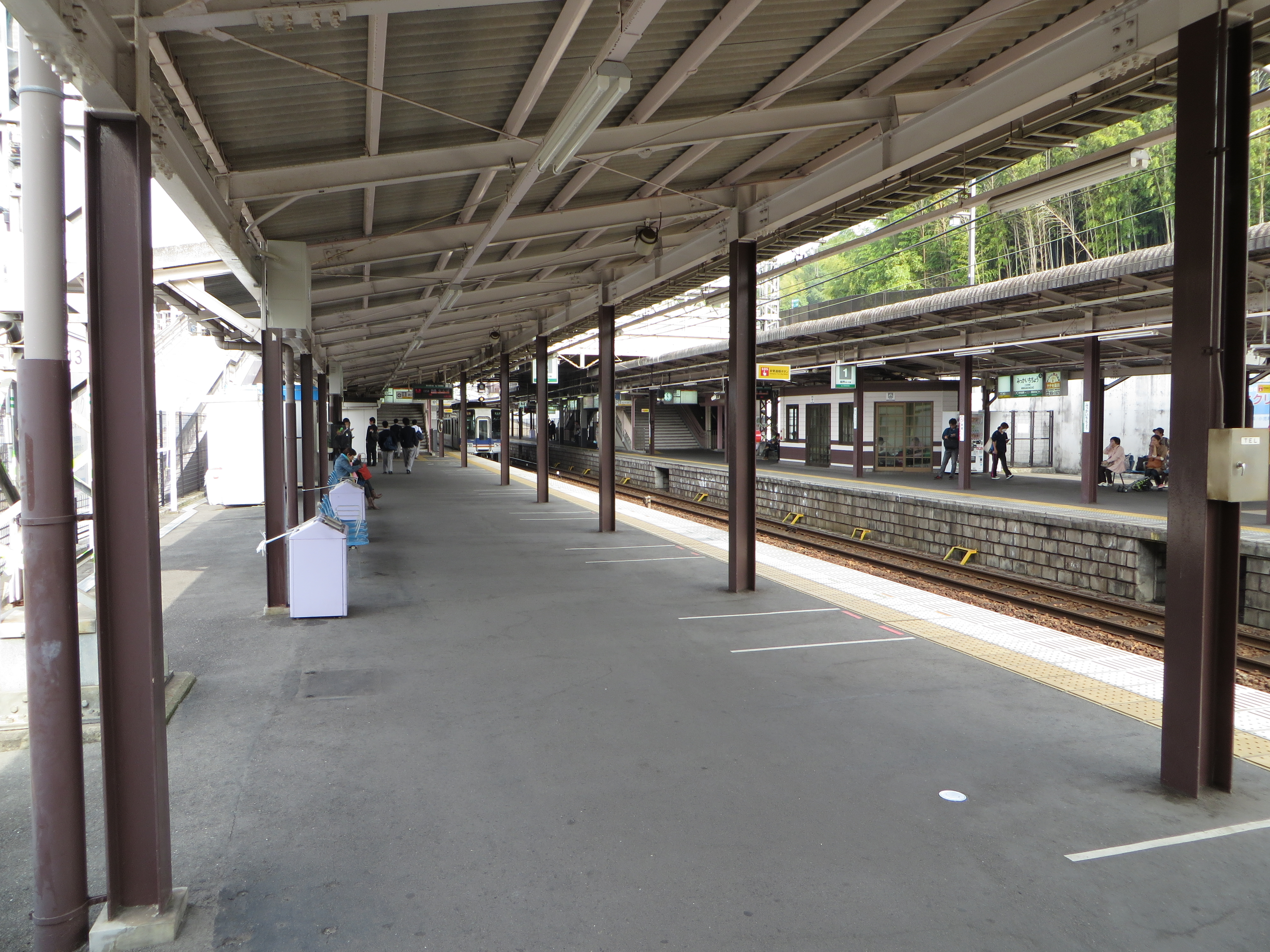
Platform

== Adjacent stations ==
«	Service	»
Koya Line
Kawachinagano	Local (各駅停車)	Mikanodai
Kawachinagano	Semi-Express	Terminus
Kawachinagano	Sub Express	Mikanodai
Kawachinagano	Express	Mikanodai
Kawachinagano	Rapid Express	Mikanodai
Limited Express "Koya", "Rinkan": Does not stop at this station

== History ==
Mikkaichichō Station opened on October 21, 1914.

== Passenger statistics ==
In fiscal 2019, the station was used by an average of 14,454 passengers daily.

== Surrounding area ==
- Kawachinagano City Higashi Junior High School
- Kawachinagano City Nankadai Junior High School
- Kawachinagano City Kagada Junior High School

== See also ==
- List of railway stations in Japan
