= Kimitōge Station =

Railway station in Hashimoto, Wakayama Prefecture, Japan

Kimitōge Station 紀見峠駅
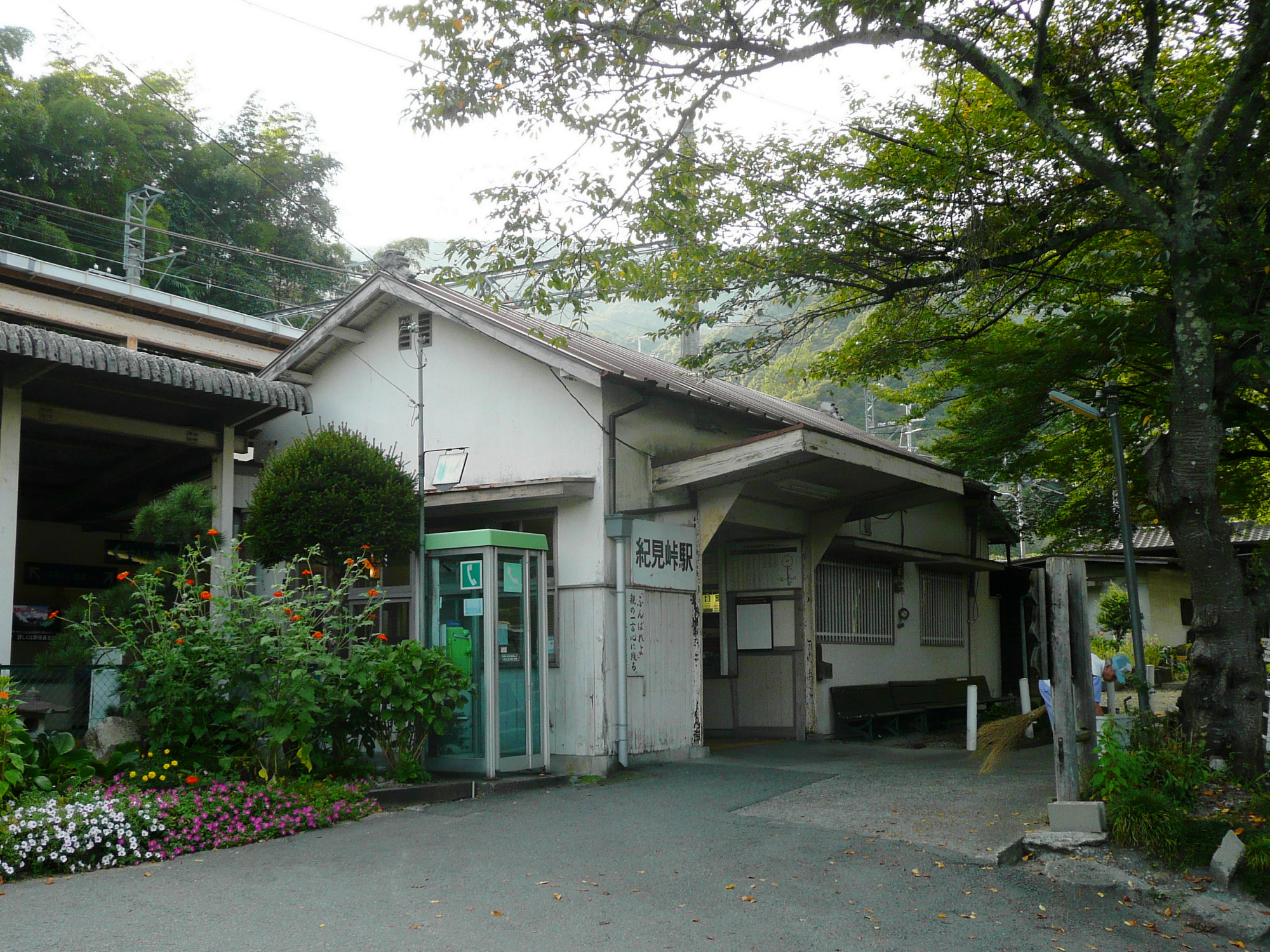
- Kimitōge Station building, September 2008

General information
- Location: 226-2, Yagurawaki, Hashimoto-shi, Wakayama-ken 648-0098; Japan
- Coordinates: 34°21′58″N 135°36′01″E
- Operator: Nankai Electric Railway
- Line: Nankai Kōya Line
- Distance: 38.6 km (24.0 miles) from Shiomibashi
- Platforms: 2 side platforms
- Connections

Other information
- Status: Unstaffed
- Station code: NK74
- Website: Official website

History
- Opened: 11 March 1915

Passengers
- FY2019: 537 daily
Location
- Location within Wakayama Prefecture Location within Japan

Kimitōge Station (紀見峠駅, Kimitōge-eki) is a passenger railway station in the city of Hashimoto, Wakayama Prefecture, Japan, operated by the private railway company Nankai Electric Railway.

== Lines ==
Kimitōge Station is served by the Nankai Kōya Line, and is located 38.6 kilometers from the terminus of the line at Shiomibashi Station and 37.9 kilometers from Namba Station.

== Station layout ==
The station consists of two opposed side platforms connected by an underground passage. The station is unattended.

=== Platforms ===
1	■ Nankai Kōya Line	for Kōyasan
2	■ Nankai Kōya Line	for Nanba

== Adjacent stations ==
«	Service	»
Nankai Electric Railway Koya Line
Limited Express "Koya", "Rinkan": Does not stop at this station
Rapid Express: Does not stop at this station
Amami	Express	Rinkanden'entoshi
Amami	Sub Express	Rinkanden'entoshi
Amami	Local	Rinkanden'entoshi

== History ==
Kimitōge Station opened on March 11, 1915 on the Takano Mountain Railway. The line was renamed the Osaka Takano Railway on April 30 of the same year, and part of the Nankai Railway network through mergers in 1922. The Nankai Railway was merged into the Kintetsu group in 1944 by orders of the Japanese government, and reemerged as the Nankai Railway Company in 1947.

== Passenger statistics ==
In fiscal 2019, the station was used by an average of 537 passengers daily (boarding passengers only).

== Surrounding area ==
- Kongō-Ikoma-Kisen Quasi-National Park
- Hashimoto City Hashiramoto Elementary School
- Hashimoto City Hashiramoto Kindergarten

== See also ==
- List of railway stations in Japan
