= Kami-Kosawa Station =

Railway station in Kudoyama, Wakayama Prefecture, Japan

Kami-Kosawa Station 上古沢駅
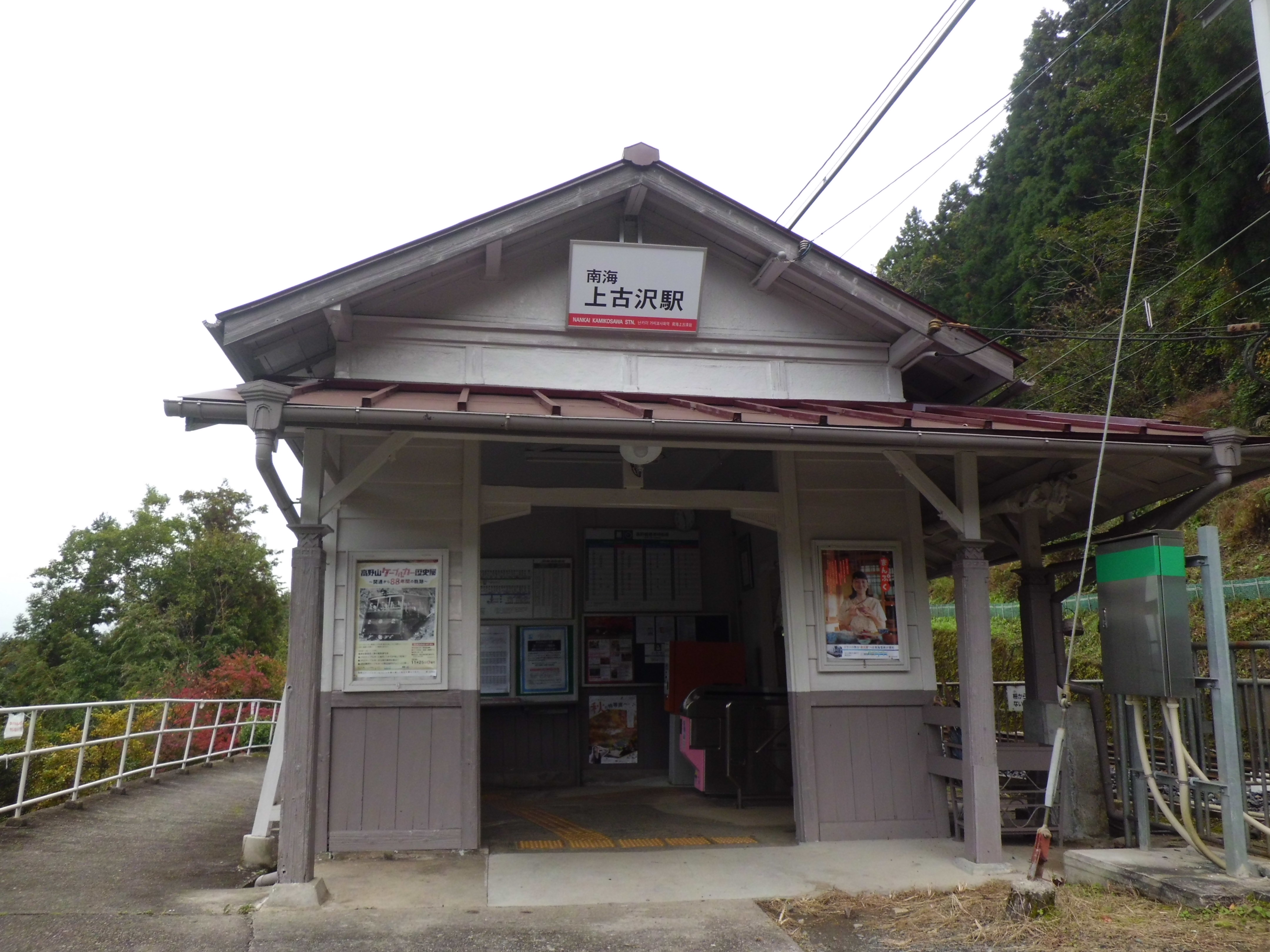
- Kami-Kosawa Station building in November 2018

General information
- Location: Kamikosawa, Kudoyama-cho, Ito-gun, Wakayama-ken 648-0143; Japan
- Coordinates: 34°15′26.4″N 135°32′52.6″E
- Operator: Nankai Electric Railway
- Line: Kōya Line
- Distance: 57.6 km (35.8 miles) from Shiomibashi
- Platforms: 2 side platforms

Other information
- Status: Unstaffed
- Station code: NK83
- Website: Official website

History
- Opened: 18 June 1928

Passengers
- FY2019: 14 daily

Services
Preceding station	Nankai Electric Railway	Following station
Shimo-Kosawa towards Namba	Kōya Line Local Express Rapid Express	Kii-Hosokawa towards Gokurakubashi
Location
- Location within Wakayama Prefecture Location within Japan

Kami-Kosawa Station (上古沢駅, Kami-Kosawa-eki) is a passenger railway station in the town of Kudoyama, Ito District, Wakayama Prefecture, Japan, operated by the private railway company Nankai Electric Railway.

== Lines ==
Kami-Kosawa Station is served by the Nankai Kōya Line, and is located 57.6 kilometers from the terminus of the line at Shiomibashi Station and 56.9 kilometers from Namba Station.

== Station layout ==
The station consists of two opposed side platforms connected to the station building by a level crossing; however, due to a landslide and damage caused by a typhoon in 2017, one of the platforms is no longer in use and the tracks have been removed. The station is unattended.

=== Platforms ===
1	■ Nankai Kōya Line	for Kōyasan for Namba
2	■ Nankai Kōya Line	not in use

== History ==
Kami-Kosawa Station opened on 18 June 1928. The Nankai Railway was merged into the Kintetsu group in 1944 by orders of the Japanese government, and reemerged as the Nankai Railway Company in 1947.

== Passenger statistics ==
In fiscal 2019, the station was used by an average of 14 passengers daily (boarding passengers only).

== Surrounding area ==
- Japan National Route 370

== See also ==
- List of railway stations in Japan
