= Kii-Hosokawa Station =

Railway station in Kōya, Wakayama Prefecture, Japan

Kii-Hosokawa Station 紀伊細川駅
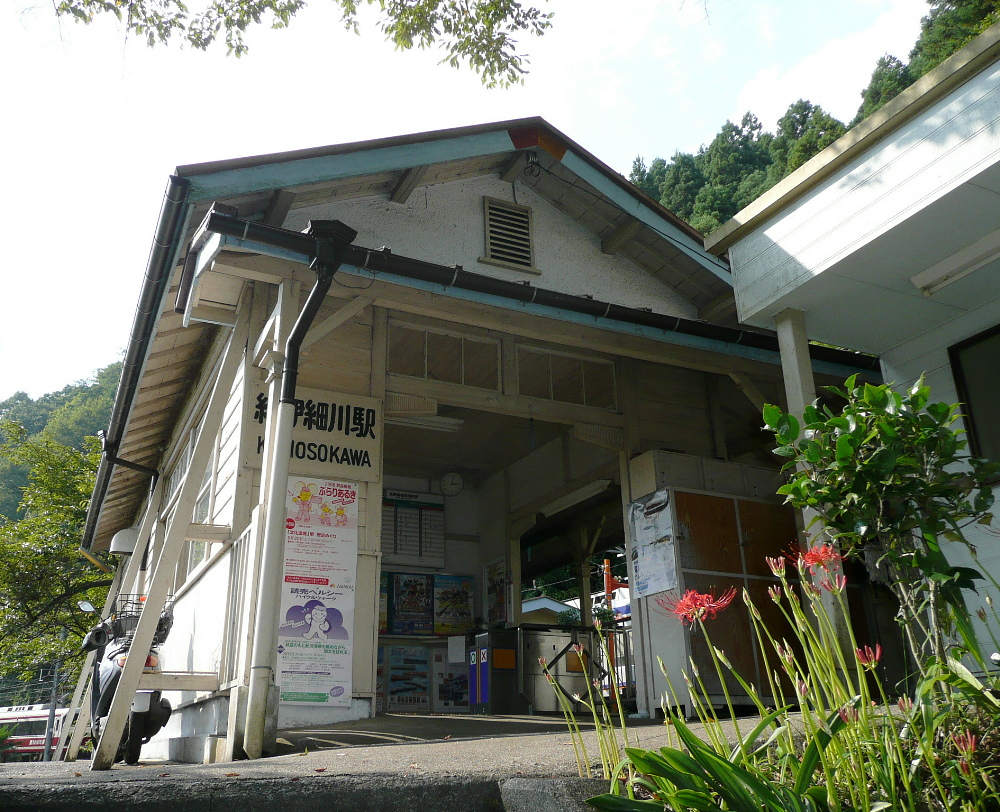
- Kii-Hosokawa Station, September 2008

General information
- Location: 732, Hosokawa, Kōya-chō, Ito-gun, Wakayama-ken 648-0262; Japan
- Coordinates: 34°14′8.6″N 135°33′13.3″E
- Operator: Nankai Electric Railway
- Line: Kōya Line
- Distance: 60.6 km (37.7 miles) from Shiomibashi
- Platforms: 2 side platforms
- Connections

Other information
- Status: Unstaffed
- Station code: NK84
- Website: Official website

History
- Opened: 18 June 1928
- Former names: Hosokawa (until 1930)

Passengers
- FY2019: 566 daily

Services
Preceding station	Nankai Electric Railway	Following station
Kami-Kosawa towards Namba	Kōya Line Local Express Rapid Express	Kii-Kamiya towards Gokurakubashi
Location
- Location within Wakayama Prefecture Location within Japan

Kii-Hosokawa Station (紀伊細川駅, Kii-Hosokawa-eki) is a passenger railway station in the town of Kōya, Ito District, Wakayama Prefecture, Japan, operated by the private railway company Nankai Electric Railway.

== Lines ==
Kii-Hosokawa Station is served by the Nankai Kōya Line, and is located 60.6 kilometers from the terminus of the line at Shiomibashi Station and 59.9 kilometers from Namba Station.

== Station layout ==
The station consists of two opposed side platforms connected to the station building by a level crossing. The station is unattended.

=== Platforms ===
1	■ Nankai Kōya Line	for Kōyasan
2	■ Nankai Kōya Line	for Hashimoto and Nanba

== History ==
Kii-Hosokawa Station opened on June 18, 1928 as Hosokawa Station (細川駅). It was renamed to its present name on March 1, 1930.

== Passenger statistics ==
In fiscal 2019, the station was used by an average of 20 passengers daily (boarding passengers only).

== Surrounding area ==
- Takano Municipal Former Nishi Hosokawa Elementary School

== See also ==
- List of railway stations in Japan
