= Tarui Station =

Tarui Station is the name of two train stations in Japan:

- Tarui Station (Gifu) (垂井駅)
- Tarui Station (Osaka) (樽井駅)
