= Yoshiminosato Station =

Railway station in Tajiri, Osaka Prefecture, Japan

Yoshiminosato Station 吉見ノ里駅
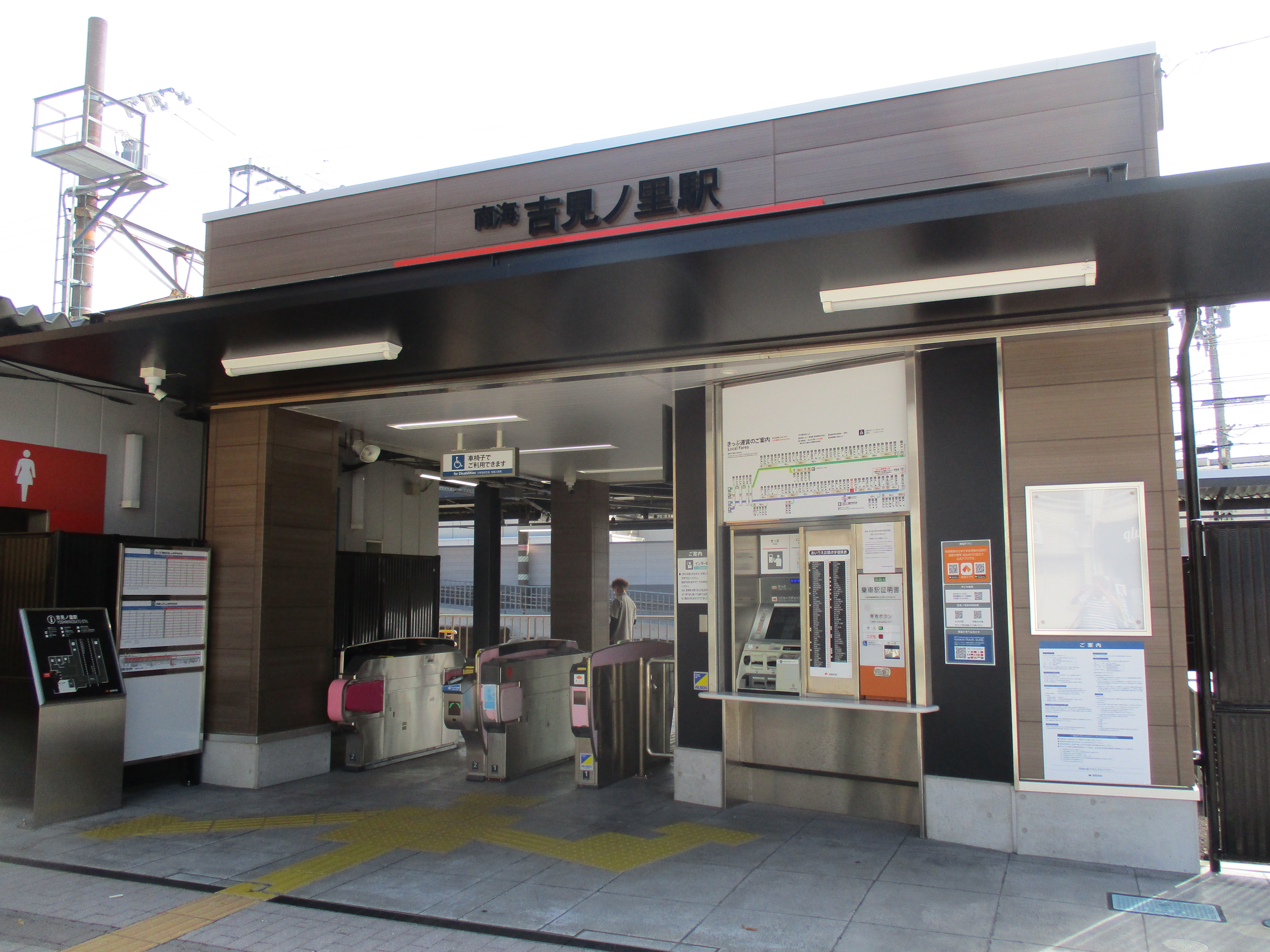
- Yoshiminosato Station in October 2025

General information
- Location: 603, Yoshimi, Tajiri-cho, Sennan-gun, Osaka-fu 598-0092; Japan
- Coordinates: 34°23′28″N 135°17′21″E
- Operator: Nankai Electric Railway
- Line: Nankai Main Line
- Platforms: 2 side platforms

Other information
- Station code: NK34
- Website: Official website

History
- Opened: 1 October 1915; 110 years ago

Passengers
- 2019: 3912 daily

Services
Preceding station	Nankai Electric Railway	Following station
Hagurazaki towards Namba	Nankai Main Line Local Sub. Express	Okadaura towards Wakayamashi
Location
- Location within Osaka Prefecture Location within Japan

Yoshiminosato Station (吉見ノ里駅, Yoshiminosato-eki) is a passenger railway station located in the town of Tajiri, Sen'nan District. Osaka Prefecture, Japan, operated by the private railway operator Nankai Electric Railway. It has the station number "NK34".

== Lines ==
Yoshiminosato Station is served by the Nankai Main Line, and is 37.4 kilometers (23.2 mi) from the terminus of the line at Namba.

== Layout ==
The station consists of two opposed side platforms connected by a level crossing. The station is unattended.

=== Platforms ===
1	■ Nankai Main Line	for Wakayamashi
2	■ Nankai Main Line	for Namba and Kansai Airport

== History ==
Yoshiminosato Station opened on 1 October 1915.

== Passenger statistics ==
In fiscal 2019, the station was used by an average of 3912 passengers daily.

== Surrounding area ==
- Tajiri Town Hall
- Tajiri Municipal Elementary School
- Tajiri Municipal Junior High School
- Tajiri History Museum

== See also ==
- List of railway stations in Japan
