= Ozaki Station =

Railway station in Hannan, Osaka Prefecture, Japan

Ozaki Station 尾崎駅
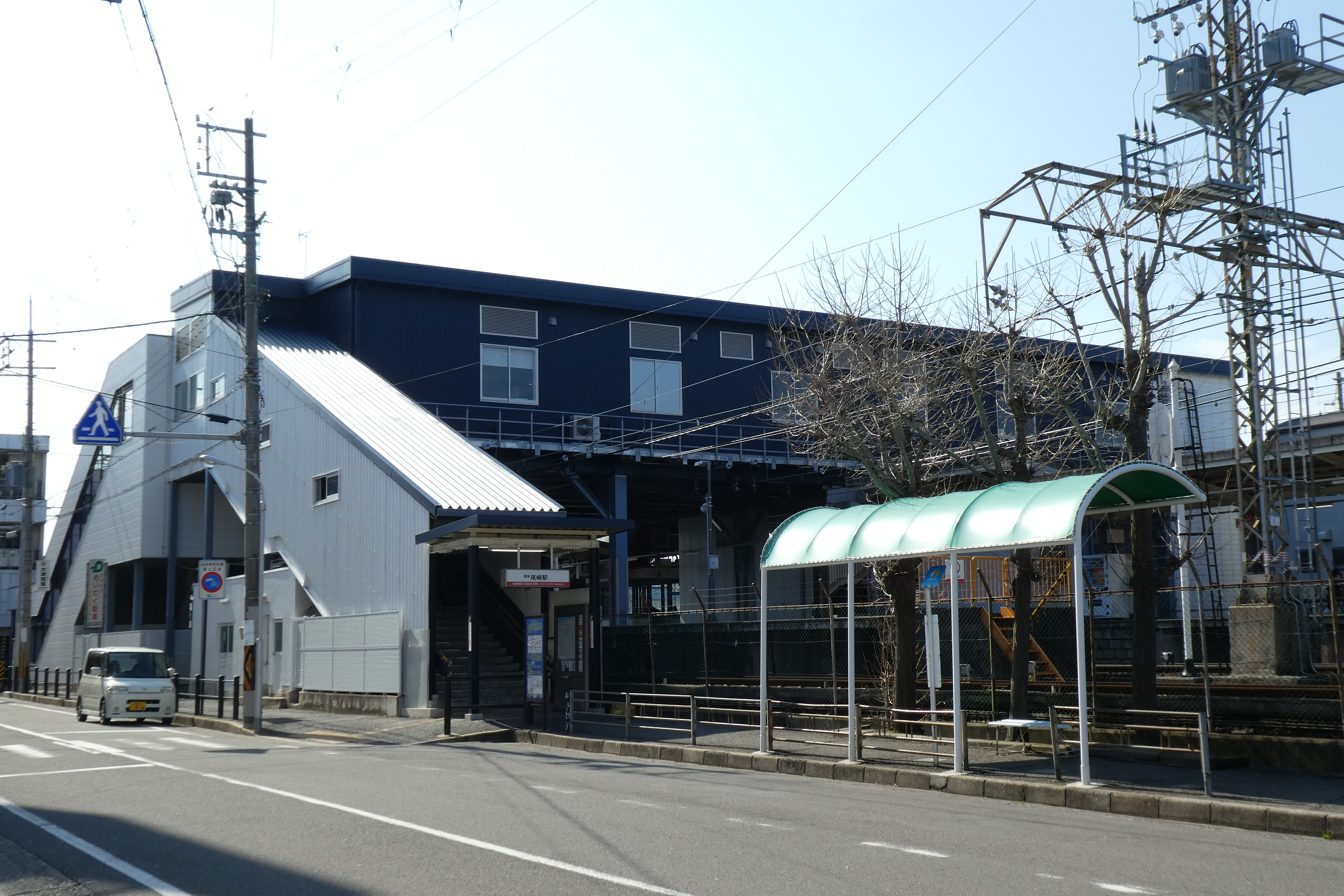
- Ozaki Station in March 2020

General information
- Location: 95-1, Ozaki-cho, Hannan-she, Osaka-fu 599-0201; Japan
- Coordinates: 34°21′42″N 135°14′27″E
- Operator: Nankai Electric Railway
- Line: Nankai Main Line
- Distance: 43.1 km from Nanba
- Platforms: 2 island platforms
- Connections: Bus stop

Construction
- Structure type: Elevated

Other information
- Station code: NK37
- Website: Official website

History
- Opened: 9 November 1897; 128 years ago
- Rebuilt: August 1973

Passengers
- 2019: 10,438 daily

Services
Preceding station	Nankai Electric Railway	Following station
Tarui towards Namba	Nankai Main Line Local Sub. Express	Tottorinoshō towards Wakayamashi
Izumisano towards Namba	Nankai Main Line Express	Misaki-kōen towards Wakayamashi
Izumisano towards Namba	Southern	Misaki-kōen towards Wakayamashi or Wakayamakō
Location
- Location within Osaka Prefecture Location within Japan

Ozaki Station (尾崎駅, Ozaki-eki) is a passenger railway station located in the city of Hannan, Osaka Prefecture, Japan, operated by the private railway operator Nankai Electric Railway. It has the station number "NK37".

== Lines ==
Ozaki Station is served by the Nankai Main Line, and is 43.1 kilometres (26.8 mi) from the terminus of the line at Namba.

== Layout ==
The station has two island platforms connected by an elevated station building.

=== Platforms ===
1, 2	■ Nankai Main Line	for Wakayamashi
3, 4	■ Nankai Main Line	for Namba and Kansai Airport

== History ==
Ozaki Station opened on 9 November 1897.

== Passenger statistics ==
In fiscal 2019, the station was used by an average of 10,438 passengers daily.

== Surrounding area ==
- Hannan City Culture Center
- Hannan City Hall
- Hannan Municipal Hospital

== See also ==
- List of railway stations in Japan
