= Okadaura Station =

Railway station in Sennan, Osaka Prefecture, Japan

Okadaura Station 岡田浦駅
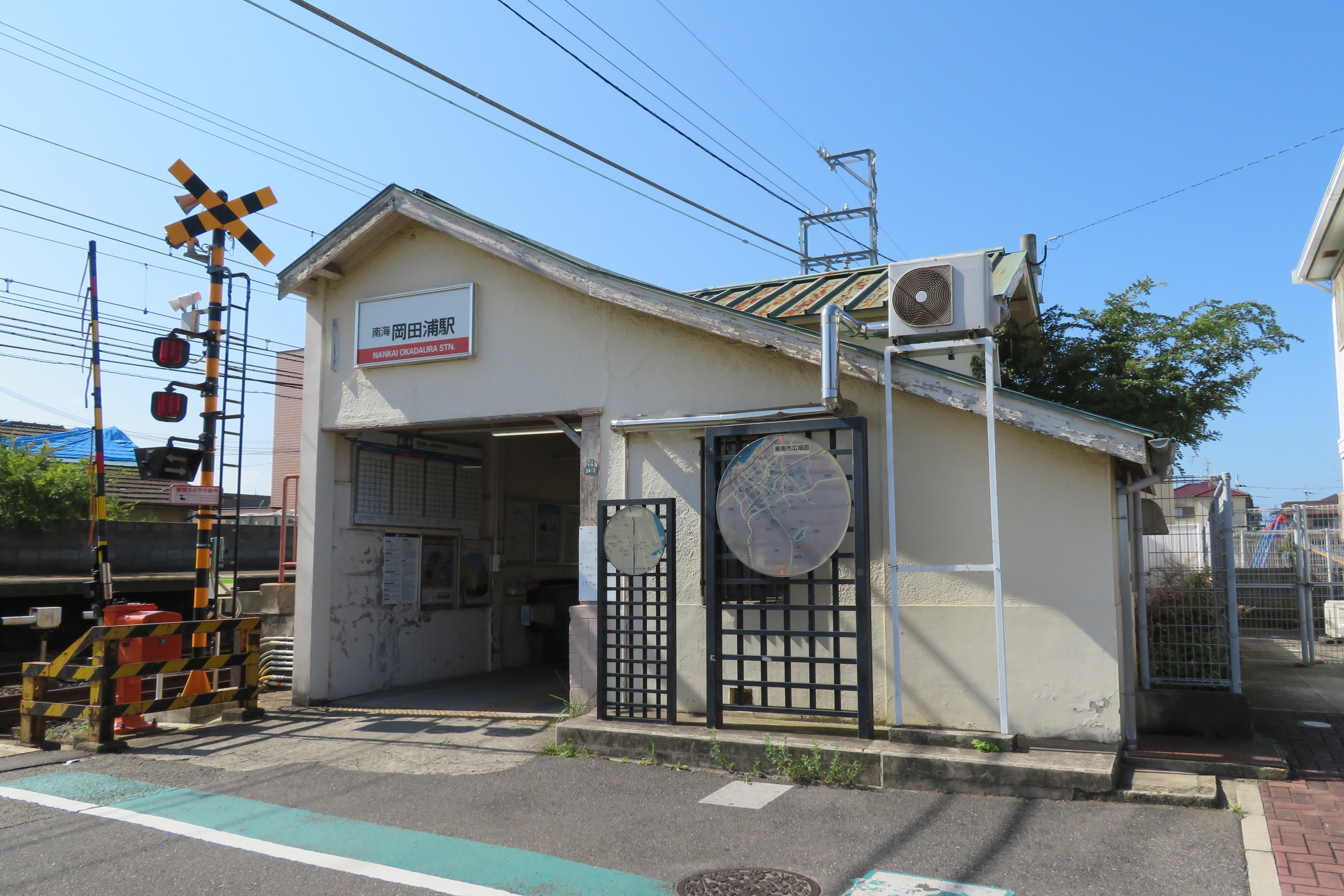
- Okadaura Station in October 2019

General information
- Location: 24-3, Okada 5-chome, Sennan-shi, Osaka-fu 590-0531; Japan
- Coordinates: 34°23′06″N 135°16′39″E
- Operator: Nankai Electric Railway
- Line: Nankai Main Line
- Distance: 38.8 km from Nanba
- Platforms: 2 side platforms

Other information
- Station code: NK35
- Website: Official website

History
- Opened: 1 November 1915; 110 years ago

Passengers
- 2019: 2478 daily

Services
Preceding station	Nankai Electric Railway	Following station
Yoshiminosato towards Namba	Nankai Main Line Local Sub. Express	Tarui towards Wakayamashi
Location
- Location within Osaka Prefecture Location within Japan

Okadaura Station (岡田浦駅, Okadaura-eki) is a passenger railway station located in the city of Sennan, Osaka Prefecture, Japan, operated by the private railway operator Nankai Electric Railway. It has the station number "NK35".

== Lines ==
Okadaura Station is served by the Nankai Main Line, and is 38.8 kilometers (24.1 mi) from the terminus of the line at Namba.

== Layout ==
The station consists of two opposed side platforms connected by a level crossing.

=== Platforms ===
1	■ Nankai Main Line	for Wakayamashi
2	■ Nankai Main Line	for Namba and Kansai Airport

== History ==
Okadaura Station opened on 1 November 1915.

== Passenger statistics ==
In fiscal 2019, the station was used by an average of 2478 passengers daily.

== Surrounding area ==
- Nishishindachi Elementary School
- Nishishindachi Junior High School
- Nishishindachi Post Office

== See also ==
- List of railway stations in Japan
