= Nankai Main Line =

Railway line in Japan

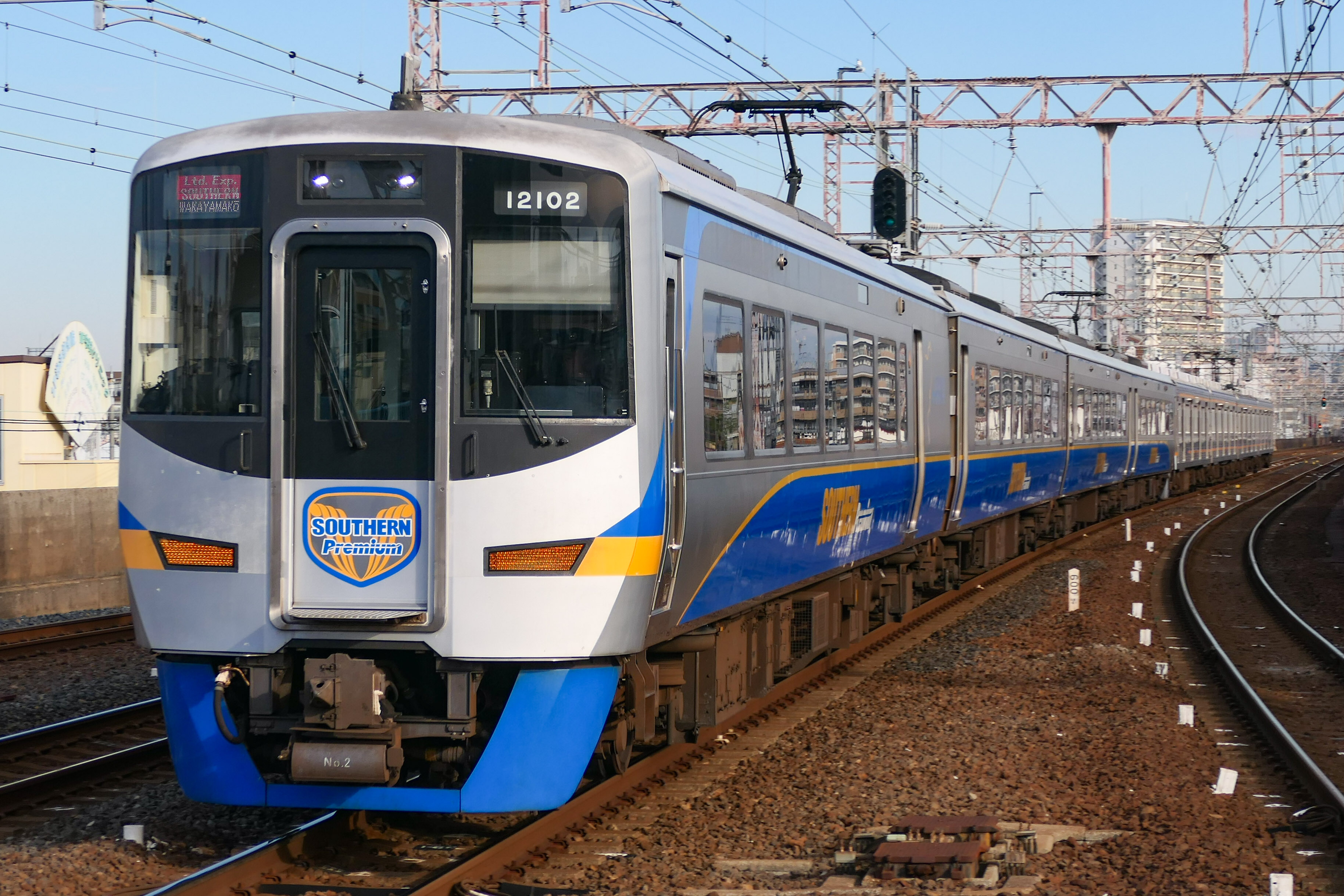
- Nankai 12000 series EMU leading a Southern service

Overview
- Native name: 南海本線
- Locale: Osaka Prefecture, Wakayama Prefecture
- Termini: Namba; Wakayamashi
- Stations: 43

Service
- Operator(s): Nankai Electric Railway Co., Ltd.

History
- Opened: 1885; 140 years ago
- Last extension: 1922
- Closed: 1993; 32 years ago (Tennoji Branch Line)

Technical
- Line length: 64.2 km (39.9 mi)
- Number of tracks: Quad (Namba - Suminoe); Double (Suminoe - Wakayamashi)
- Track gauge: 1,067 mm (3 ft 6 in)
- Old gauge: Namba—Sakai (Azumabashi): 2 ft 9 in (838 mm) (1885—1897)
- Electrification: 1,500 V DC, overhead lines
- Operating speed: 110 km/h (68 mph)

The Nankai Main Line (南海本線, Nankai Honsen) is one of the two main railway lines of Japanese private railway company Nankai Electric Railway, together with Kōya Line. The route is from Namba Station in south downtown of Osaka to Wakayamashi Station in Wakayama via Sakai, Izumiōtsu, Kishiwada, Kaizuka, Izumisano, Sennan, Hannan and Misaki municipalities. The proper name is with the company's name, "the Nankai Main Line", not simply "the Main Line" often seen in other Japanese private railways. Lines of the Nankai Main Lane and the connecting lines excluded the Kōya Line and the Airport Line are named generically "the Nankai Line (南海線, Nankai Sen)". The line is shown with a pictogram of waves, or distinguished with blue from conifer or green Kōya Line.

== Route data ==
- Line length: 64.2 km (39.9 mi)
- Track: quadruple from Namba to Suminoe (to Kishinosato-Tamade, eastern two tracks are for Kōya Line exclusively), double from Suminoe to Wakayamashi

== Service types ==
Nankai and Kintetsu are the only two private railway operators in Kansai that offer charged Limited Express trains.

Limited Express Southern (特急サザン, Tokkyū "Sazan")
Limited express trains named "Southern" are operated between Namba and Wakayamashi or Wakayamakō. They are operated with 8-car formations and 4 cars of 8 are charged for seat reservation. Trains to and from Wakayamakō connect to Nankai Ferry services to and from the Shikoku region.
Airport Limited Express rapi:t (空港特急ラピート, Kūkō Tokkyū "Rapīto")
Airport limited express trains named "rapi:t" are operated between Namba and Kansai Airport and exclusively with 50000 series 6-car formations. All cars are charged for seat reservation. rapi:t α trains stop at only stations marked with S, and rapi:t β trains at stations marked with S and S*. They have been operated since Kansai International Airport opened in 1994.
Express (急行, Kyūkō)
Express trains are operated between Namba and Wakayamashi or Wakayamakō before 10 a.m. and after 4 p.m. on weekdays and in morning on Saturdays, Sundays, Holidays, and pass Haruki Station. They are operated with 6 or 8-car formations. The fourth car of 8-car trains for Namba is only for women in the morning until arriving at Tengachaya by 8:30 a.m. on weekdays.
Before November 26, 2005, operated all day, two per hour from 10 a.m. to 4 p.m.
Airport Express (空港急行, Kūkō Kyūkō)
Airport express trains are operated between Namba and Kansai Airport all day and stop at Haruki. 4 trains are operated per direction per hour from 10 a.m. until 4 pm. They are operated with 6 or 8-car formations. The fourth car of 8-car trains for Namba is only for women in the morning until arriving at Tengachaya by 8:30 a.m. on weekdays.
Sub Express (区間急行, Kukan Kyūkō)
Sub express trains are operated between Namba and Hagurazaki, Misakikoen or Wakayamashi in the morning, evening, and night. They stop at airport express stations between Namba and Izumisano, and every station between Izumisano and Wakayamashi. Namba-bound trains are operated every morning and weekday rush hours in the evening.
Semi-Express (準急行, Junkyūkō)
Semi-express trains are operated from Hagurazaki or Haruki to Namba only on weekday mornings.
Local (普通, Futsū)
Local trains are operated between Namba and Wakayamashi all day. They also return to Namba at Hagurazaki, Tarui, Misakikōen or Kansai Airport in the rush hours and midnight. Only 1 northbound train is operated from Wakayamashi to Hagurazaki in the midnight. Trains pass Imamiyaebisu and Haginochaya stations due to absence of platforms on the tracks of the Nankai Line. Those stations are served by local trains of the Kōya Line.
In Japanese railway operation, "Futsū" (literally "ordinary, normal") and "Kakueki Teisha" (literally "train that stops at every station", "Kakutei" for short) are used interchangeably for trains that stop at every station. On the Nankai Railway alone, however, the two words are used for different classes of train. The former is for Locals of Nankai Main Line that do not stop at the above two stations, while the latter is for Kōya Line trains that do stop there, true to the meaning of the Japanese name of the service class.

== Stations ==
=== Main Line ===
- ● : Trains stop.
- ▲: Rapi:t α trains pass, β trains stop.
- ▼: At Haruki, Express trains marked with a white line makes a stop
- ◆: Trains stop in the off-peak hours from January 1 until 3 every year.
- ｜ ↑: All trains pass (Arrows indicate directions)
- Wakayamadaigakumae became one of the Southern stations on October 18, 2014.

Number	Station	Japanese	Distance (km)	Local	Semi-Express	Sub-Express	Airport Express	Express	Ltd. Exp. Southern	Ltd. Exp. Rapi:t	Transfers	Location	
NK01	Namba	難波	0.0	●	●	●	●	●	●	●	Osaka Metro: Midosuji Line (M20); Yotsubashi Line (Y15); Sennichimae Line (S16); A Kintetsu Namba Line (A01: Osaka Namba); Hanshin Namba Line (HS41: Osaka Namba); JR West Kansai Main Line (Yamatoji Line) (JR-Q17:JR Namba)	Chūō-ku, Osaka	Osaka Prefecture
NK02	Imamiyaebisu	今宮戎	0.9	｜	↑	｜	｜	｜	｜	｜		Naniwa-ku, Osaka	Osaka Prefecture
NK03	Shin-Imamiya	新今宮	1.5	●	●	●	●	●	●	●	JR West: Osaka Loop Line (JR-O19); Kansai Main Line (Yamatoji Line) (JR-Q19); Osaka Metro (Dōbutsuen-mae Station): Midosuji Line (M22); Sakaisuji Line (K19); Hankai Tramway Hankai Line (HN52: Shin-Imamiya-Ekimae Station)	Nishinari-ku, Osaka	Osaka Prefecture
NK04	Haginochaya	萩ノ茶屋	2.0	｜	↑	｜	｜	｜	｜	｜		Nishinari-ku, Osaka	Osaka Prefecture
NK05	Tengachaya	天下茶屋	3.0	●	●	●	●	●	●	●	Osaka Metro Sakaisuji Line (K20)	Nishinari-ku, Osaka	Osaka Prefecture
NK06	Kishinosato-Tamade	岸里玉出	3.9	●	↑	｜	｜	｜	｜	｜	Koya Line; Shiomibashi Line	Nishinari-ku, Osaka	Osaka Prefecture
NK07	Kohama	粉浜	5.1	●	↑	｜	｜	｜	｜	｜		Sumiyoshi-ku, Osaka	Osaka Prefecture
NK08	Sumiyoshitaisha	住吉大社	5.7	●	↑	◆	◆	｜	｜	｜	Hankai Tramway: Uemachi Line (HN10: Sumiyoshi Station); Hankai Line (HN12: Sumiyoshitriimae Station)	Sumiyoshi-ku, Osaka	Osaka Prefecture
NK09	Suminoe	住ノ江	6.7	●	↑	｜	｜	｜	｜	｜		Suminoe-ku, Osaka	Osaka Prefecture
NK10	Shichidō	七道	8.2	●	↑	｜	｜	｜	｜	｜		Sakai-ku, Sakai	Osaka Prefecture
NK11	Sakai	堺	9.8	●	●	●	●	●	●	▲		Sakai-ku, Sakai	Osaka Prefecture
NK12	Minato	湊	11.2	●	●	｜	｜	｜	｜	｜		Sakai-ku, Sakai	Osaka Prefecture
NK13	Ishizugawa	石津川	12.7	●	●	｜	｜	｜	｜	｜		Nishi-ku, Sakai	Osaka Prefecture
NK14	Suwanomori	諏訪ノ森	13.8	●	●	｜	｜	｜	｜	｜		Nishi-ku, Sakai	Osaka Prefecture
NK15	Hamaderakōen	浜寺公園	14.8	●	●	｜	｜	｜	｜	｜	Hankai Tramway Hankai Line (HN31: Hamadera-Ekimae Station)	Nishi-ku, Sakai	Osaka Prefecture
NK16	Hagoromo	羽衣	15.5	●	●	●	●	●	｜	｜	Takashinohama Line; JR West Higashi-Hagoromo Branch Line (Higashi-Hagoromo Station)	Takaishi	Osaka Prefecture
NK17	Takaishi	高石	17.4	●	●	｜	｜	｜	｜	｜		Takaishi	Osaka Prefecture
NK18	Kita-Sukematsu	北助松	18.5	●	●	｜	｜	｜	｜	｜		Izumiōtsu	Osaka Prefecture
NK19	Matsunohama	松ノ浜	19.5	●	●	｜	｜	｜	｜	｜		Izumiōtsu	Osaka Prefecture
NK20	Izumiōtsu	泉大津	20.4	●	●	●	●	●	｜	｜		Izumiōtsu	Osaka Prefecture
NK21	Tadaoka	忠岡	22.3	●	●	｜	｜	｜	｜	｜		Tadaoka	Osaka Prefecture
NK22	Haruki	春木	23.7	●	●	●	●	▼	｜	｜		Kishiwada	Osaka Prefecture
NK23	Izumi-Ōmiya	和泉大宮	25.0	●	●	｜	｜	｜	｜	｜		Kishiwada	Osaka Prefecture
NK24	Kishiwada	岸和田	26.0	●	●	●	●	●	●	▲		Kishiwada	Osaka Prefecture
NK25	Takojizō	蛸地蔵	26.9	●	●	｜	｜	｜	｜	｜		Kishiwada	Osaka Prefecture
NK26	Kaizuka	貝塚	28.6	●	●	●	●	●	｜	｜	Mizuma Railway Mizuma Line	Kaizuka	Osaka Prefecture
NK27	Nishikinohama	二色浜	30.4	●	●	｜	｜	｜	｜	｜		Kaizuka	Osaka Prefecture
NK28	Tsuruhara	鶴原	31.3	●	●	｜	｜	｜	｜	｜		Izumisano	Osaka Prefecture
NK29	Iharanosato	井原里	32.4	●	●	｜	｜	｜	｜	｜			Osaka Prefecture
NK30	Izumisano	泉佐野	34.0	●	●	●	●	●	●	●	Nankai Airport Line (Through trains for Kansai Airport are available.)		Osaka Prefecture
Through service:				From Izumisano: Local / Airport Express / Limited Express Rapi:t to Nankai Airport Line for Kansai Airport									
NK33	Hagurazaki	羽倉崎	36.1	●	●	●		｜	｜			Izumisano	Osaka Prefecture
NK34	Yoshiminosato	吉見ノ里	37.4	●		●		｜	｜			Tajiri	Osaka Prefecture
NK35	Okadaura	岡田浦	38.8	●		●		｜	｜			Sennan	Osaka Prefecture
NK36	Tarui	樽井	40.6	●		●		｜	｜			Sennan	Osaka Prefecture
NK37	Ozaki	尾崎	43.1	●		●		●	●			Hannan	Osaka Prefecture
NK38	Tottorinoshō	鳥取ノ荘	44.6	●		●		｜	｜			Hannan	Osaka Prefecture
NK39	Hakotsukuri	箱作	46.6	●		●		｜	｜			Hannan	Osaka Prefecture
NK40	Tannowa	淡輪	50.2	●		●		｜	｜			Misaki	Osaka Prefecture
NK41	Misaki-kōen	みさき公園	51.9	●		●		●	●		Tanagawa Line	Misaki	Osaka Prefecture
NK42	Kyōshi	孝子	56.3	●		●		｜	｜			Misaki	Osaka Prefecture
NK43	Wakayamadaigakumae (Fujitodai)	和歌山大学前 （ふじと台）	58.0	●		●		●	●			Wakayama	Wakayama Prefecture
NK44	Kinokawa	紀ノ川	61.6	●		●		｜	｜		Kada Line (Kada Sakana Line)	Wakayama	Wakayama Prefecture
NK45	Wakayamashi	和歌山市	64.2	●		●		●	●		Wakayamako Line; JR West Kisei Main Line	Wakayama	Wakayama Prefecture
Through service:				From Wakayamashi: Express (weekdays only) / Limited Express Southern to Wakayamako Line for Wakayamako									

=== Tennoji Branch Line ===
Listed counterclockwise: All stations are in the city of Osaka, Osaka Prefecture.

Station	Japanese	Closed	Location
Tengachaya	天下茶屋	18 November 1984	Nishinari-ku, Osaka
Hikifune	曳舟	1949	Nishinari-ku, Osaka
Imaikecho	今池町	1 April 1993	Nishinari-ku, Osaka
Omondori	大門通	1949	Nishinari-ku, Osaka
Tobitahondori	飛田本通	1 April 1993	Nishinari-ku, Osaka
Tennoji	天王寺	1 April 1993	Tennōji-ku, Osaka

== Rolling stock ==
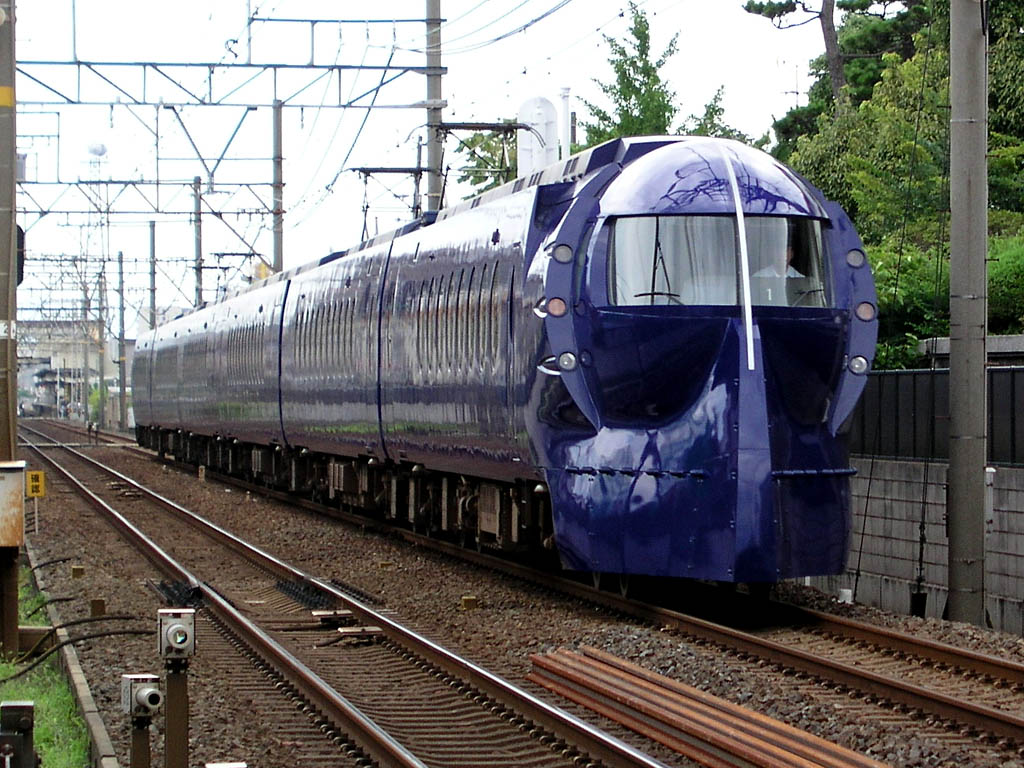
50000 series EMU on a rapi:t limited express service

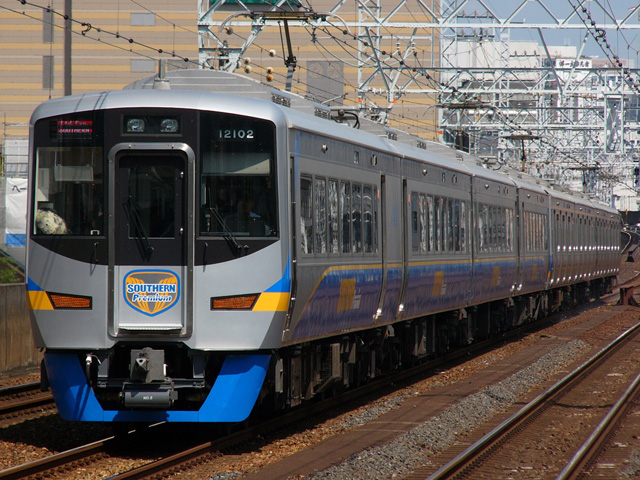
12000 series EMU on a Southern limited express service bound for Wakayamakō

- 9000 series exclusively for Southern (non-reserved car)
- 8300 series (from Autumn 2015) exclusively for Southern (non-reserved car, from December 2020)
- 8000 series exclusively for Southern (non-reserved car)
- 7100 series exclusively for Southern (non-reserved car)
- 7000 series (until October 2015)
- 2000 series
- 1000 series
- 10000 series exclusively for Southern (reserved car)
- 12000 series exclusively for Southern (reserved car)
- 50000 series exclusively for rapi:t
- 3000 series
- Semboku 5000 series
- Semboku 7000 series
- Semboku 7020 series

== History ==
One of the oldest private railway lines still existing, the 2 ft 9 in (838 mm) gauge Namba - Yamatogawa (since closed) section was opened in 1885 by Hankai Railway (阪堺鉄道, Hankai Tetsudō) (separate from the present-day Hankai Tramway). The line was extended to Sakai in 1888, and the Namba - Sumiyoshitaisha section was duplicated in 1892.

In 1897 the then separate Nankai Railway opened the Sakai - Sano (present-day Izumisano) section as 1067mm gauge, with the Namba - Sano section regauged to match, and the Sumiyoshitaisha - Sano section duplicated the same year. The following year the Hankai Co. merged with Nankai Railway, and the line was extended to Wakayama. The present line to Wakayamashi was completed in 1903, and in 1906 the first dining car on a private railway in Japan was introduced on the Wakayama express.

The duplication of the line extended to Hamaderakōen in 1907, Kaizuka in 1911, Takako in 1915 and was completed to Wakayama in 1922.

Electrification at 600 VDC began in 1907 on the section from Namba to Hamaderakōen, and was completed in 1911. The voltage was increased to 1500 VDC in 1973.

Works to elevate long sections of the line began with the short downtown section including Imamiyaebisu station in the 1930s and continued from the 1970s until the 2020s. The first 18 km until past Takaishi station will be completely elevated by 2028, and three shorter isolated sections further down the line have also been elevated. Completion of the various stages:

- 1938: Imamiyaebisu
- 1980: Namba (terminus), Kohama - Sumiyoshitaisha - Suminoe
- 1985: Shichidō - Sakai - Minato - Ishizugawa
- 1993: Tengachaya - Kishinosato-Tamade
- 1994: Kishiwada
- 2008: Matsunohama, Izumisano
- 2012: Izumiōtsu
- 2021: Hagoromo - Takaishi
- 2024: Tennoji Branch Line
- 2028: Suwanomori - Hamaderakōen

=== Former connecting lines ===
- Tengachaya station - A 2 km line to Tennoji opened in 1900. In 1933 the line was electrified at 1500 VDC, the line closing in 1984.
- Sakai station - A 2 km 1435mm gauge line from Shukuin to Ohama, electrified at 600 VDC, opened by the BanSakai Electric Railway Co. in 1912 (and acquired by Nankai in 1914) connected at this station until closed in 1949.
- Wakayama station - A 3 km line to Higashi-Matsue on the Nankai Kada Line opened in 1912. The line was electrified at 600 VDC in 1930, and closed in 1955.
