= Hagurazaki Station =

Railway station in Izumisano, Osaka Prefecture, Japan

Hagurazaki Station 羽倉崎駅
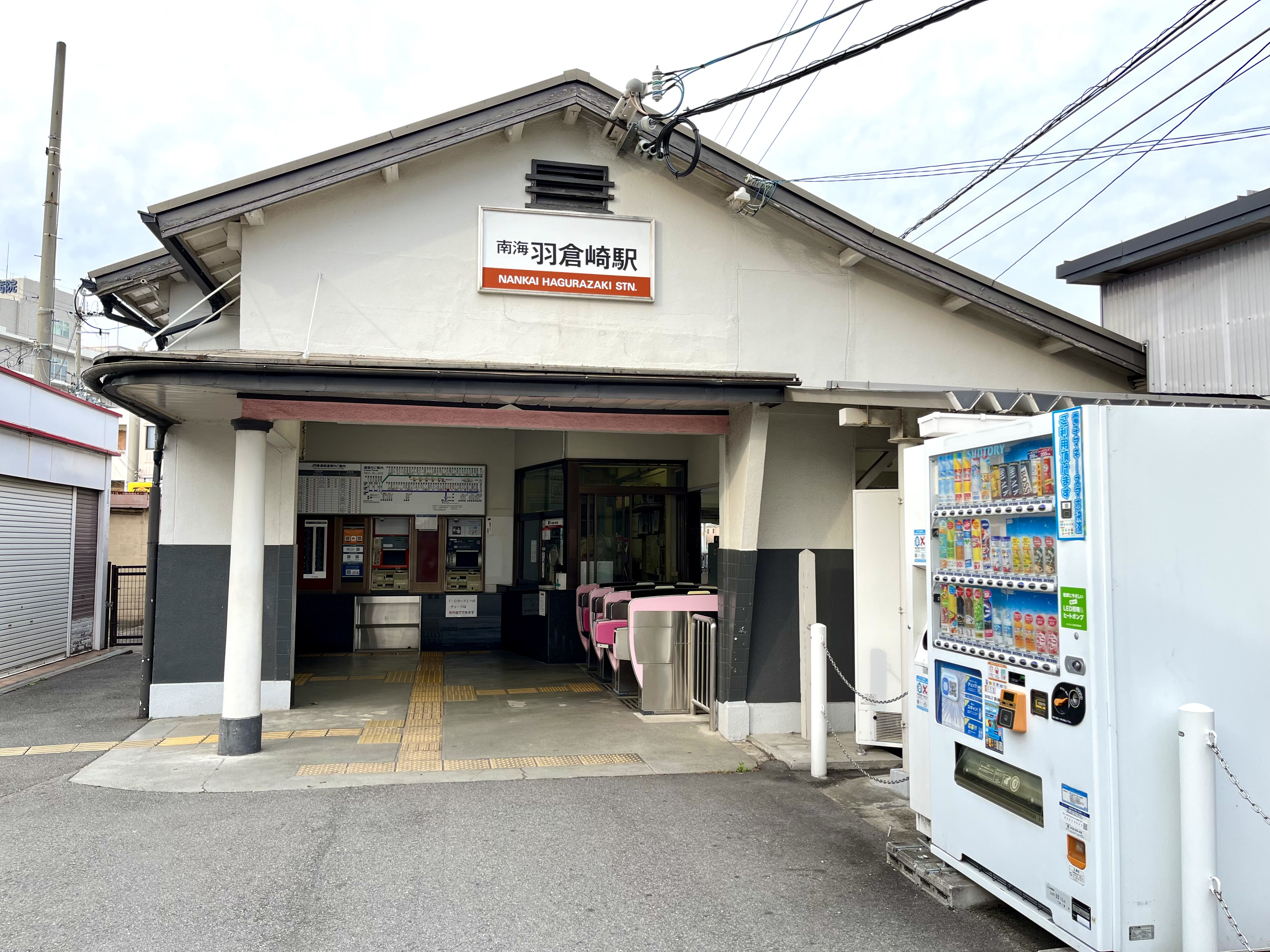
- Hagurazaki Station in June 2023

General information
- Location: 1-24, Hagurazaki 1-chome, Izumisano-shi, Osaka-fu 598-0046; Japan
- Coordinates: 34°23′58″N 135°17′58″E
- Operator: Nankai Electric Railway
- Line: Nankai Main Line
- Distance: 36.1 km from Namba
- Platforms: 1 side + 1 island platform

Other information
- Station code: NK33
- Website: Official website

History
- Opened: 1 February 1942; 84 years ago

Passengers
- 2019: 6190 daily

Services
Preceding station	Nankai Electric Railway	Following station
Izumisano towards Namba	Nankai Main Line Local Sub. Express	Yoshiminosato towards Wakayamashi
Izumisano towards Namba	Nankai Main Line Semi-Express	Terminus
Location
- Location within Osaka Prefecture Location within Japan

Hagurazaki Station (羽倉崎駅, Hagurazaki-eki) is a passenger railway station located in the city of Izumisano, Osaka Prefecture, Japan, operated by the private railway operator Nankai Electric Railway. It has the station number "NK33".

== Lines ==
Hagurazaki Station is served by the Nankai Main Line, and is 36.1 kilometers (22.4 mi) from the terminus of the line at Namba.

== Layout ==
The station consists of one island platform and one side platform connected by an underground passage.

=== Platforms ===
1	■ Nankai Main Line	for Namba and Kansai Airport
2	■ Nankai Main Line	for Wakayamashi
3	■ Nankai Main Line	for Namba and Kansai Airport

== History ==
Hagurazaki Station opened on 1 February 1942.

== Passenger statistics ==
In fiscal 2019, the station was used by an average of 6190 passengers daily.

== Surrounding area ==
- Izumisano City Sano Junior High School

== See also ==
- List of railway stations in Japan
