= Tarui Station (Osaka) =

Railway station in Sennan, Osaka Prefecture, Japan

Tarui Station 樽井駅
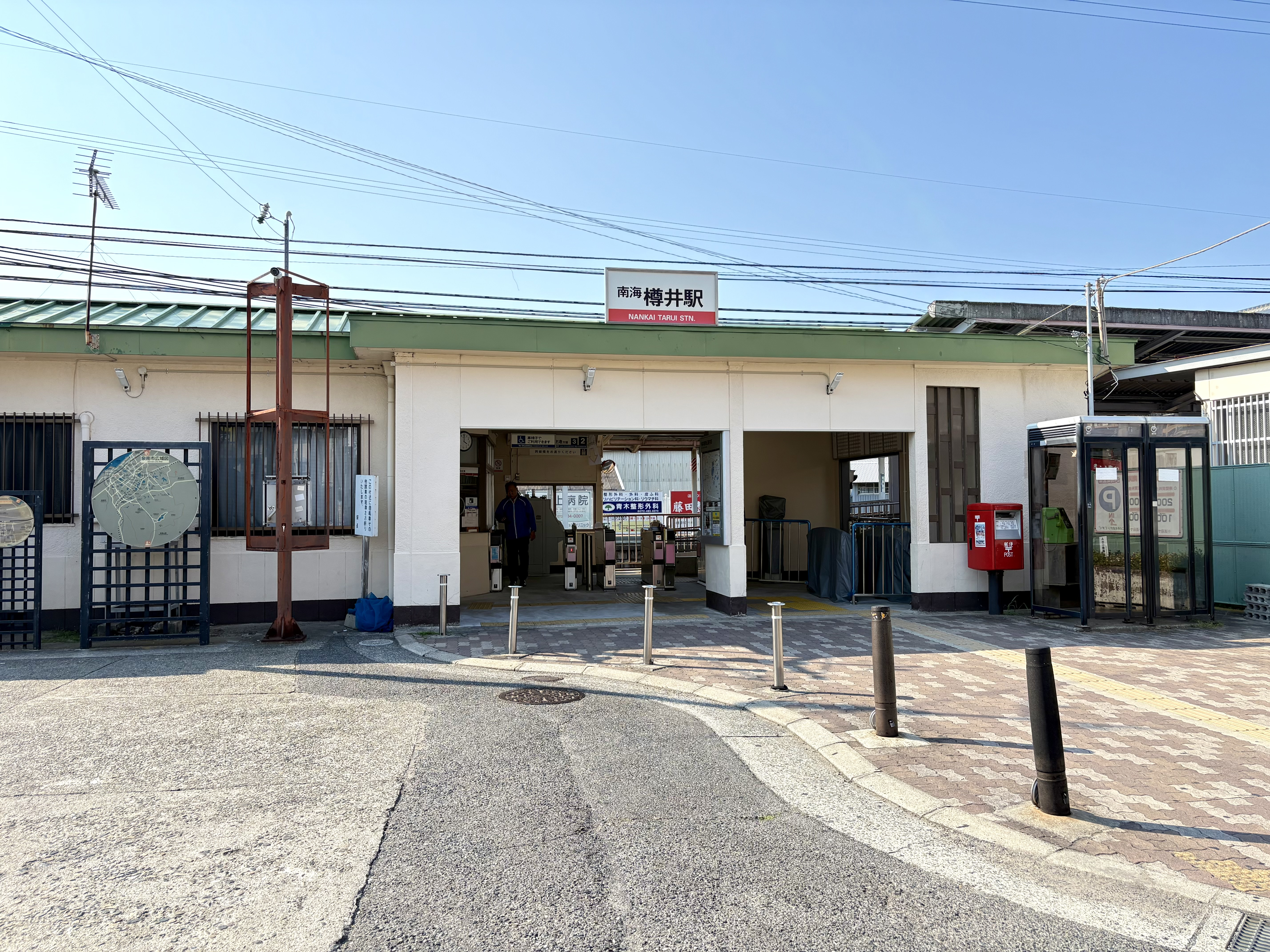
- Tarui Station entrance in August 2025

General information
- Location: 41-1, Tarui 5-chome, Sennan-shi, Osaka-fu 590-0521; Japan
- Coordinates: 34°22′27″N 135°15′41″E
- Operator: Nankai Electric Railway
- Line: Nankai Main Line
- Distance: 40.6 km from Namba
- Platforms: 1 island + 1 side platform
- Connections: Bus terminal

Other information
- Station code: NK36
- Website: Official website

History
- Opened: 9 November 1897; 128 years ago

Passengers
- 2019: 7956 daily

Services
| Preceding station | Nankai Electric Railway | Following station |
|---|---|---|
| Okadaura towards Namba | Nankai Main Line Local Sub. Express | Ozaki towards Wakayamashi |
Location
- Location within Osaka Prefecture Location within Japan

Tarui Station (樽井駅, Tarui-eki) is a passenger railway station located in the city of Sennan, Osaka Prefecture, Japan, operated by the private railway operator Nankai Electric Railway. It has the station number "NK36".

== Lines ==
Tarui Station is served by the Nankai Main Line, and is 40.6 kilometers (25.2 mi) from the terminus of the line at Namba.

== Layout ==
The station consists of one side platform and one island platforms connected by a footbridge.

=== Platforms ===
| 1 | ■ Nankai Main Line | for Wakayamashi |
| 2, 3 | ■ Nankai Main Line | for Namba and Kansai Airport |

== History ==
Tarui Station opened on 9 November 1897.

== Passenger statistics ==
In fiscal 2019, the station was used by an average of 7956 passengers daily.

== Surrounding area ==
- Tarui Public Hall
- Sennan Post Office

== See also ==
- List of railway stations in Japan
