= Sennan, Osaka =

Sennan 泉南市
- City
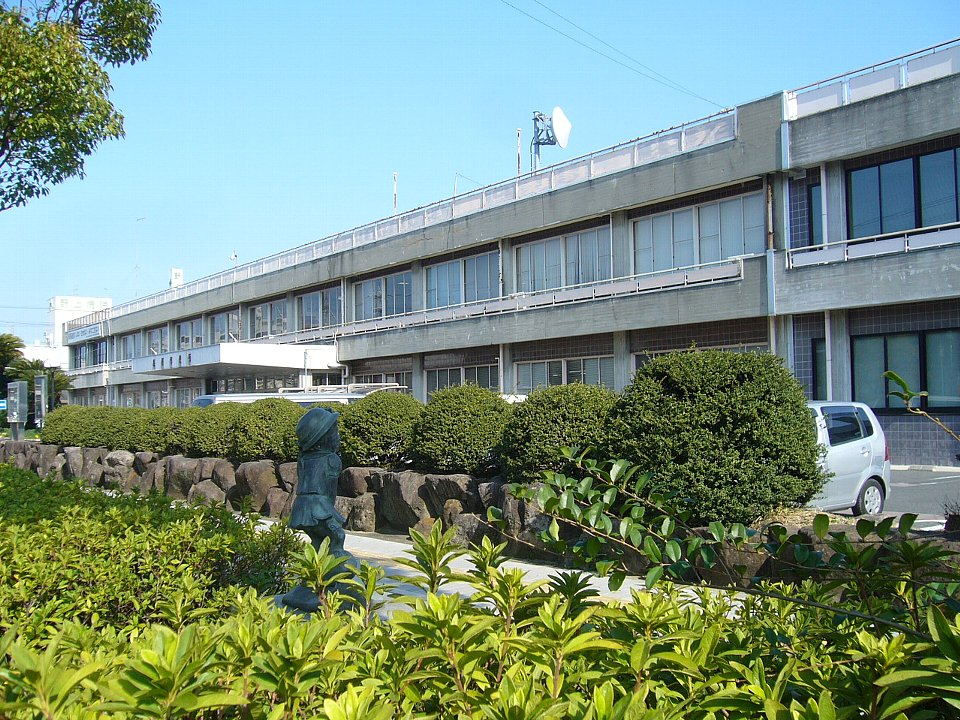
- Sennan City Hall

- Flag Seal

- Location of Sennan in Osaka Prefecture

- Location in Japan
- Coordinates: 34°21′46″N 135°16′34″E
- Country: Japan
- Region: Kansai
- Prefecture: Osaka

Government
  - Mayor: Yuma Yamamoto (since May 2022)

Area
  - Total: 48.98 km^{2} (18.91 sq mi)

Population (December 31, 2021)
  - Total: 60,318
  - Density: 1,231/km^{2} (3,190/sq mi)
- Time zone: UTC+09:00 (JST)
- City hall address: 1-1-1 Tarui, Sennan-shi, Osaka-fu 590-0592
- Symbols
- Flower: Prunus mume
- Tree: Cinnamomum camphora

Sennan (泉南市, Sennan-shi) is a city located in Osaka Prefecture, Japan. As of 31 December 2021, the city had an estimated population of 60,318 in 26214 households and a population density of 1200 persons per km^{2}. The total area of the city is 48.98 square kilometres (18.91 sq mi).

== Geography ==
Sennan is located in the southwestern part of Osaka prefecture. The northwest portion of the city is bordered by Osaka Bay and the southeastern portion borders the Izumi Mountains and Wakayama Prefecture. About one-third of the southern part of Kansai International Airport is within the borders of Sennan city, contributing to the city's economy, as well as the FedEx North Pacific Hub.

=== Neighboring municipalities ===
- Osaka Prefecture
  - Hannan
  - Izumisano
  - Tajiri
- Wakayama Prefecture
  - Iwade
  - Kinokawa

== Climate ==
Sennan has a humid subtropical climate (Köppen Cfa) characterized by warm summers and cool winters with light to no snowfall. The average annual temperature in Sennan is 15.1 °C. The average annual rainfall is 1713 mm with September as the wettest month. The temperatures are highest on average in August, at around 26.5 °C, and lowest in January, at around 4.4 °C.

== Demographics ==
Per Japanese census data, the population of Sannan has increased steadily over the past century.

Historical population
Year	Pop.	±%
1920	13,603	—
1930	16,794	+23.5%
1940	19,324	+15.1%
1950	23,463	+21.4%
1960	32,075	+36.7%
1970	38,206	+19.1%
1980	53,324	+39.6%
1990	60,065	+12.6%
2000	64,152	+6.8%
2010	64,416	+0.4%

== History ==
The area of the modern city of Sennan was within ancient Izumi Province. Per the Kojiki and the Nihon Shoki, during Jimmu's Eastern Expedition to conquer the Yamato Basin, Jimmu and his brothers forces advanced up the Seto Inland Sea and landed near Naniwa. They faced stiff resistance from a local king named Nagamitsu-hiko and during the ensuing battle Itsuse no Mikoto was struck by an arrow. The area of Sennan is one of the locations which claim to be the site of this battle. Centuries later, it was the site of the Battle of Kashii, was the very first battle of the Summer Campaign of the 1615 Siege of Osaka. In the Edo Period, much of the city area was controlled by Kishiwada Domain, Yodo Domain or directly by the Tokugawa shogunate. The village of Tarui was established within Hine District with the creation of the modern municipalities system on April 1, 1889. On April 1, 1896 the area became part of Sennan District, Osaka. Tarui was promoted to town status on April 1, 1940. The town of Shindachi was created by the merger of the villages of Shindachi and Higashi-Shindachi on February 11, 1941. On September 30, 1956, the towns of Tarui and Shindachi merged with the villages of Onoshindachi, Shinge, Narutaki, and Nishishindachi to form the town of Sennan. On July 1, 1970 Sennan was promoted to city status. Sennan entered into discussions to merge with either Hannan and Misaki, or with Hannan, Misaki, Izumisano and Tajiri to form the city of "Sennanshu" (南泉州市) from 2001 to 2004; however, per a public referendum, only Misaki was in favor of the merger and the plans were abandoned.

== Government ==
Sennan has a mayor-council form of government with a directly elected mayor and a unicameral city council of 15 members. Sennan collectively with the cities of Kaizuka, Hannan, and the town of Misaki contributes two members to the Osaka Prefectural Assembly. In terms of national politics, the city is part of Osaka 19th district of the lower house of the Diet of Japan.

== Economy ==
Sennan was traditionally dependent on commercial fishing and agriculture; however, since the opening of Kansai International Airport, the city rapidly industrialized with logistics and support industries for airport-related operations.

== Education ==
Sennan has ten public elementary schools and four public middle schools operated by the city government and one public high school operated by the Osaka Prefectural Department of Education. The prefecture also operated two special education schools for the handicapped.

== Religion ==
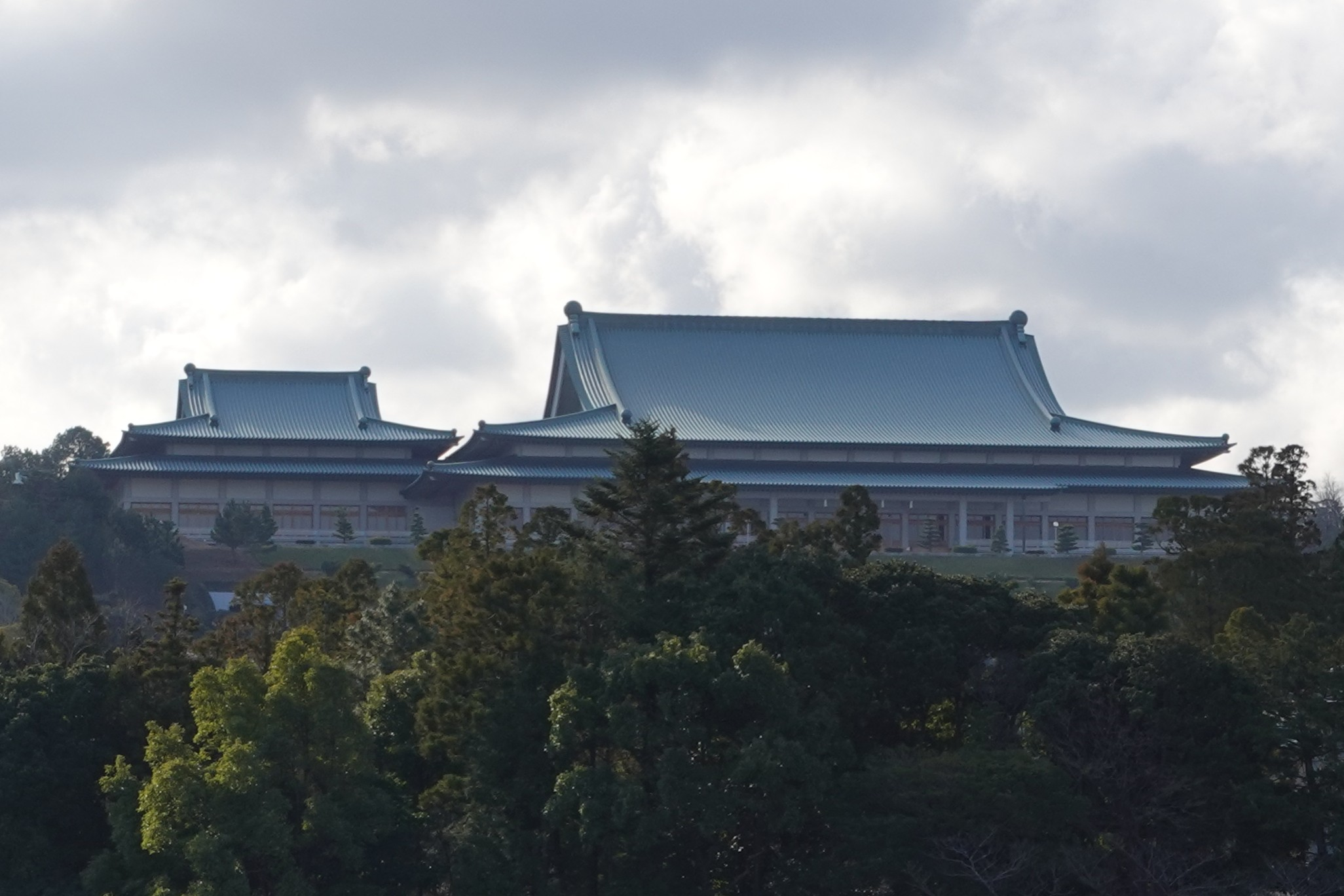
The Sennan Temple, Honmichi's main temple and Sennan's largest religious building

Many residents of Sennan are adherents of Honmichi, a Japanese new religion derived from Tenrikyo. Honmichi's largest building, the Sennan Temple (泉南神殿, Sennan Shinden), is located in Sennan.

== Transportation ==
=== Railway ===
JR West – Hanwa Line

- Shinge - Izumi-Sunagawa

Nankai Electric Railway - Nankai Main Line

- Okadaura - Tarui

=== Highway ===
- Hanwa Expressway
- National Route 26

== Local attractions ==
- Kaie-ji temple ruins, A National Historic Site

== Gallery ==
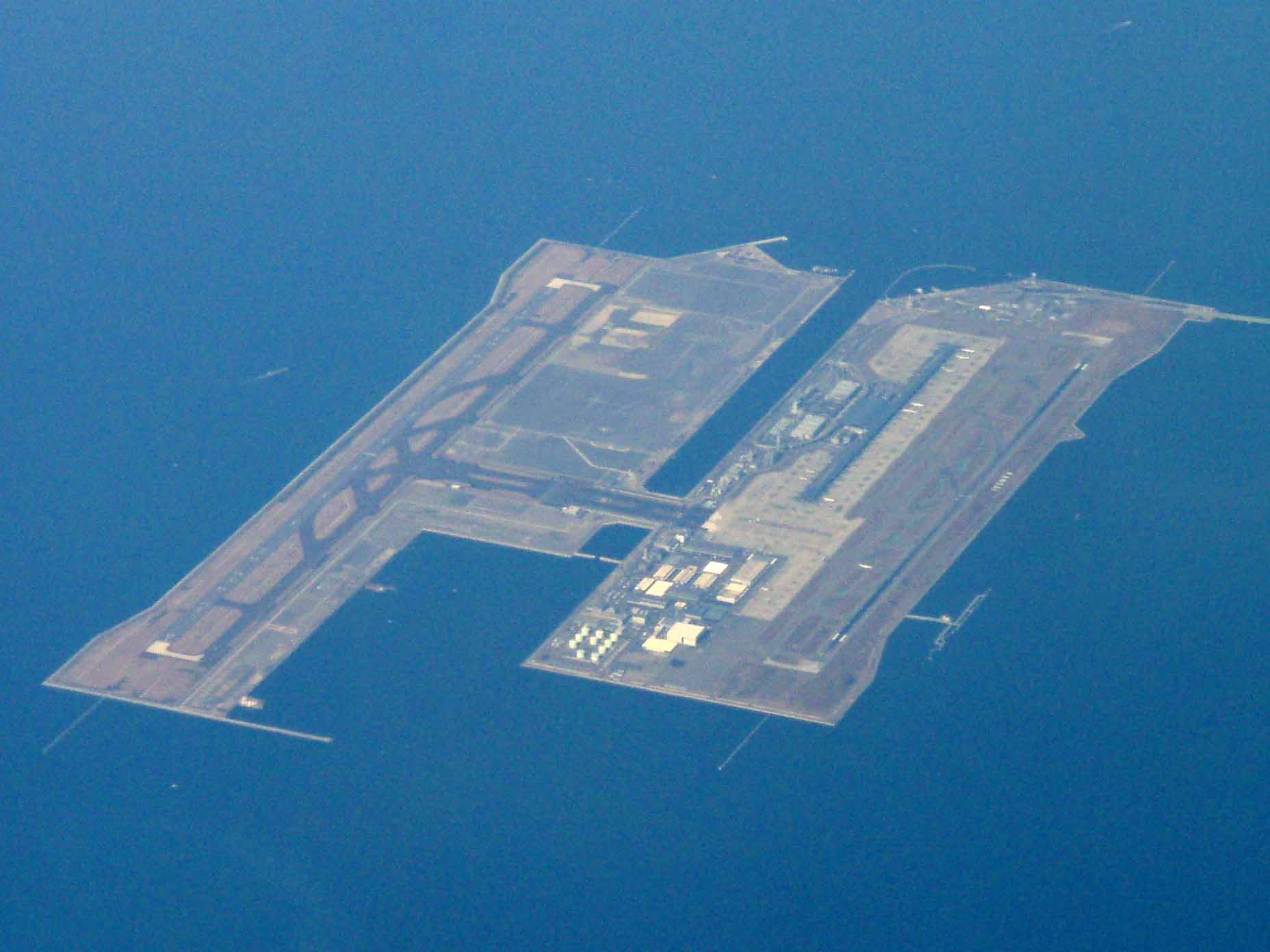
Kansai International Airport

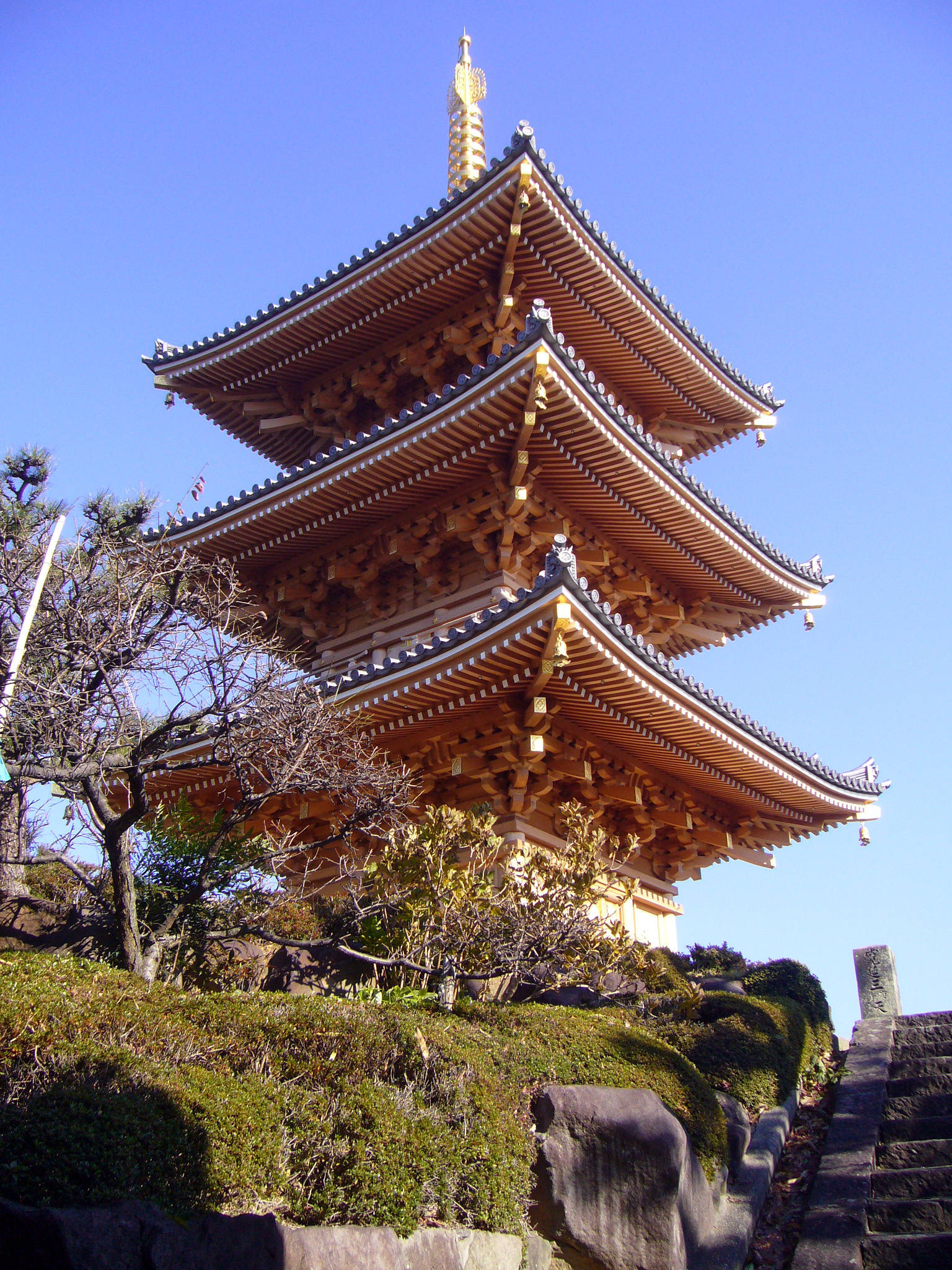
Chokei-ji

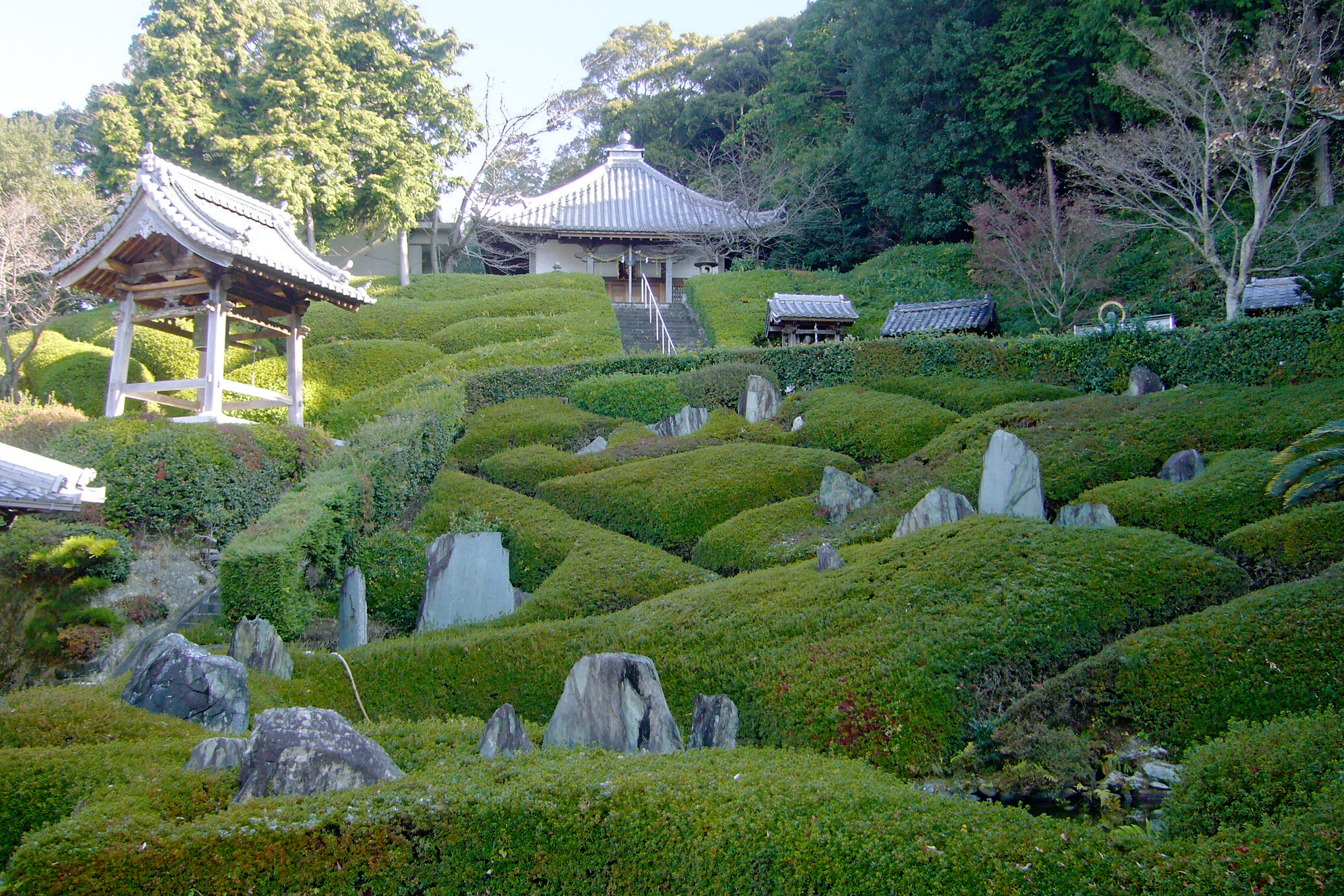
Rinsho-ji gardens

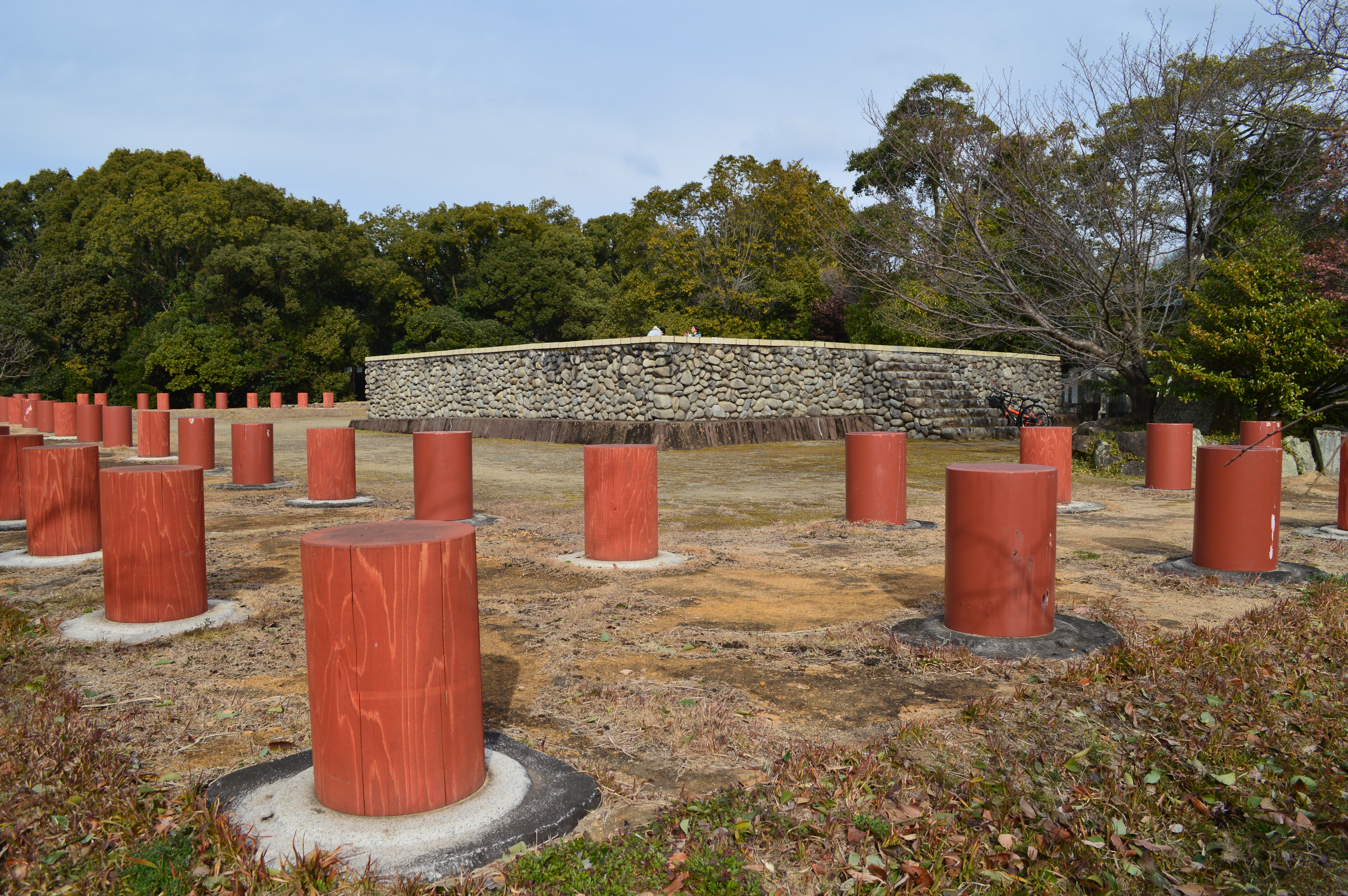
Kaie-ji ruins
