= Rinkū-town Station =

Railway station in Izumisano, Osaka Prefecture, Japan

Rinkū-town Station りんくうタウン駅
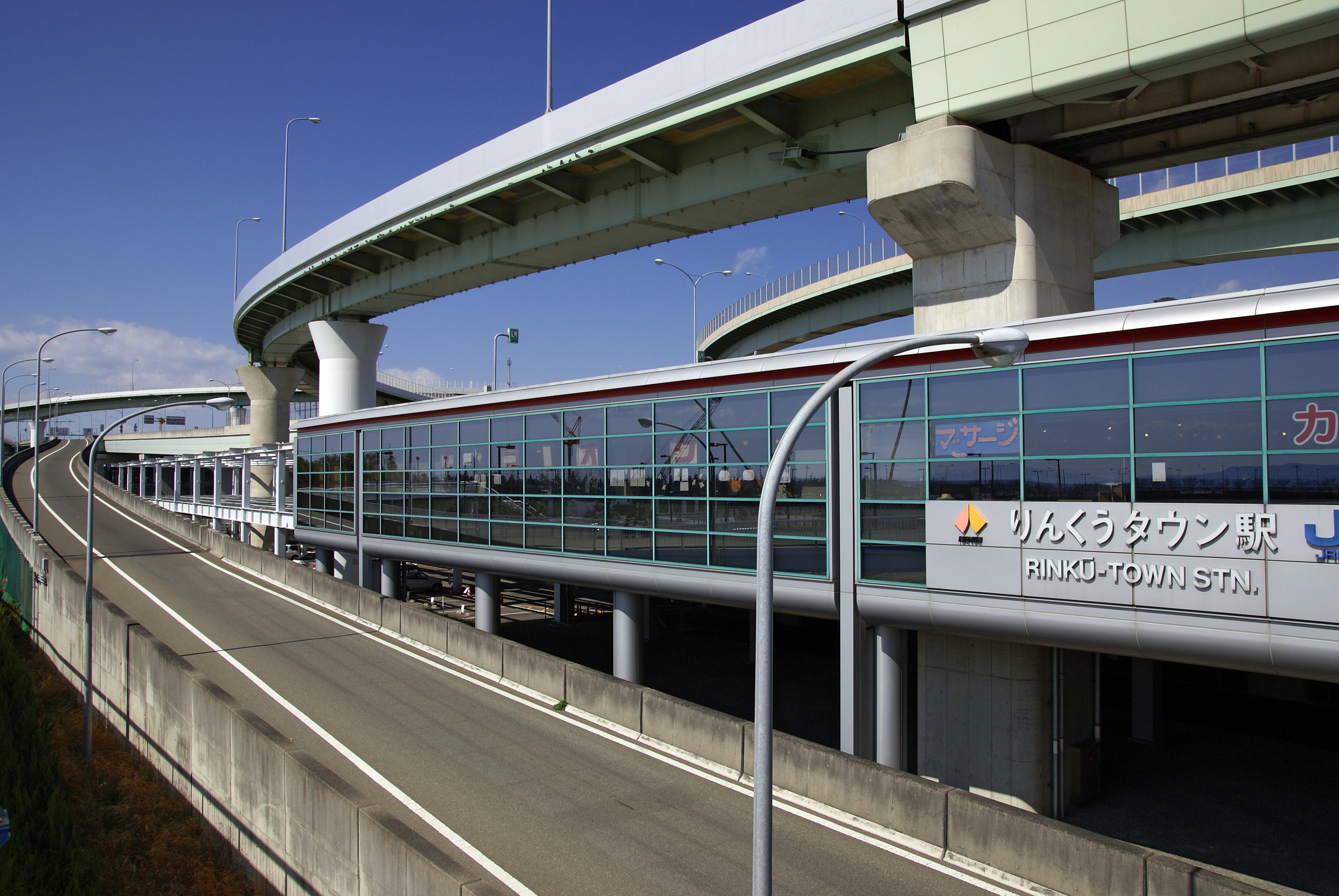
- Rinkū-town Station building in March 2007

General information
- Location: 1, Rinkū Ōrai-kita, Izumisano City, Osaka Prefecture; Osaka Prefecture; Japan
- Coordinates: 34°24′37.64″N 135°17′59.61″E
- Owner: New Kansai International Airport Co., Ltd.
- Operator: JR West; Nankai Electric Railway
- Lines: Kansai Airport Line; Nankai Airport Line
- Platforms: 2 island platforms
- Tracks: 4
- Connections: Bus terminal

Construction
- Structure type: Elevated

Other information
- Station code: NK31 (Nankai); JR-S46 (JR West)
- Website: Official website

History
- Opened: 15 June 1994; 32 years ago

Passengers
- 2019: 6,263 daily (Nankai); 3,574 daily (JR West)

Services
Preceding station	JR West	Following station
Kansai Airport Terminus	Kansai Airport Line Local Kansai Airport Rapid Direct Rapid	Hineno Terminus
Haruka does not stop here
Preceding station	Nankai Electric Railway	Following station
Izumisano NK30 Terminus	Airport Line Local Airport Express	Kansai Airport NK32 Terminus
Izumisano NK30 towards Namba	Rapi:t	Kansai Airport NK32 Terminus
Location
- Location within Osaka Prefecture Location within Kansai region Location within Japan

Rinkū-town Station (りんくうタウン駅, Rinkū-taun-eki) is an elevated passenger railway station shared by Nankai Electric Railway and West Japan Railway Company (JR West) located in Izumisano, Osaka, Japan, jointly operated by West Japan Railway Company (JR West) and the private railway operator Nankai Electric Railway. It serves the Rinku Town commercial district located adjacent to Kansai International Airport. With the exception of Kansai Airport Limited Express Haruka services, all train services to and from the airport make stop at this station. It has the Nankai station number "NK31", and the JR West station number "JR-S46".

== Lines ==
Rinkū-town Station is served by the Nankai Airport Line and is 39.1 kilometers from the terminus of the line at Namba. It is also served by the Kansai Airport Line and is 39.1 kilometers from the terminus of that line at Tennōji.

== Station layout ==
The station has two island platforms on the third floor, serving two tracks each. Trains for different railway companies stop at adjacent platforms without any physical barriers, but transfers can only be made between the two by using special IC card terminals located within the station. The station is directly connected to the Rinku Gate Tower Building.

=== Platforms ===
1	■ Nankai Railway Airport Line	for Kansai Airport
2	■ JR West Kansai Airport Line	for Kansai Airport
3	■ JR West Kansai Airport Line	Kansai Airport Rapid Service and Direct Rapid Service for Tennōji and Osaka; Shuttle trains for Hineno
4	■ Nankai Railway Airport Line	for Namba

== History ==
The station opened on 15 June 1994.

Station numbering was introduced to the JR West facilities in March 2018 with Rinkū-town being assigned station number JR-R46 for the Kansai Airport Line.

== Passenger statistics ==
In fiscal 2019, the JR West portion of the station was used by an average of 3574 passengers daily (boarding passengers only), while the Nankai portion of the station was used by an average of 6,263 passengers daily during the same period..

== Surrounding area ==
- Rinku Gate Tower Building
- Rinku Premium Outlet shopping mall
- Rinku Pleasure Town Seacle, commercial facility
- Marble Beach

== See also ==
- List of railway stations in Japan
