= Nankai Airport Line =

Airport Line
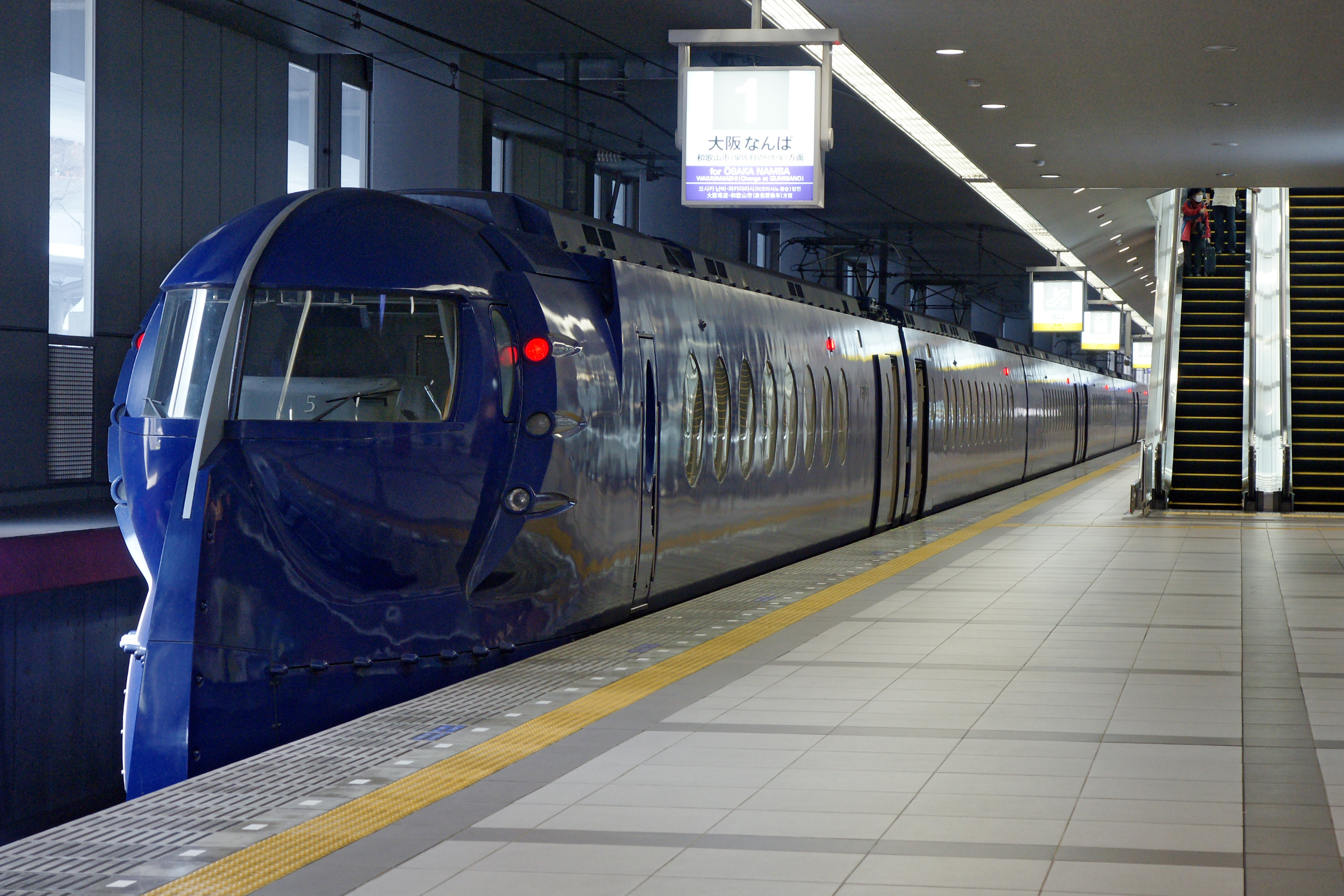
- Airport Limited Express rapi:t at Kansai Airport Station

Overview
- Owner: Nankai Electric Railway (Izumisano–Rinkū Town); New Kansai International Airport Co., Ltd. (Rinkū Town–Kansai Airport)
- Locale: Osaka Prefecture
- Termini: Izumisano; Kansai Airport
- Stations: 3

Service
- Operator: Nankai Electric Railway
- Rolling stock: 1000 series; 2000 series; 7100 series; 8000 series; 8300 series; 9000 series; 50000 series

History
- Opened: June 15, 1994; 32 years ago

Technical
- Line length: 8.8 km (5.5 mi)
- Number of tracks: 2
- Track gauge: 1,067 mm (3 ft 6 in)
- Electrification: 1,500 V DC, overhead lines
- Operating speed: 120 km/h (75 mph)

The Airport Line (空港線, Kūkō sen) is a railway line operated by the Nankai Electric Railway, which connects Izumisano and Kansai International Airport and is owned by Kansai International Airport Co., Ltd. between Rinkū Town and Kansai Airport.

It is one of the access routes to the Kansai International Airport which is located on an artificial island in Ōsaka Bay. The line colour of the Airport Line is purple.

== Rolling stock ==
- Nankai 7000 series (until October 2015)
- Nankai 7100 series
- Nankai 9000 series
- Nankai 2000 series
- Nankai 1000 series
- Nankai 8000 series
- Nankai 8300 series (from Autumn 2015)
- Nankai 50000 series, used on rapi:t services
- JR West trains also use the track between Rinkū Town and Kansai Airport.

== Stations ==
- Limited express (rapi:t), Airport express, Local: All trains stop at every station.
- For stations within the Nankai Main Line, refer to the "Nankai Main Line" article.

No.	Station name	Japanese	Distance (km)	Transfers	Location	
NK30	Izumisano	泉佐野	0.0	Nankai Main Line (Through trains for Namba are available.)	Osaka Prefecture	Izumisano
NK31	Rinkū Town	りんくうタウン	1.9	S Kansai Airport Line (JR-S46)	Osaka Prefecture	Izumisano
NK32	Kansai Airport	関西空港駅	8.8	S Kansai Airport Line (JR-S47)	Osaka Prefecture	Tajiri

== History ==
The Nankai Airport Line opened on June 15, 1994.

In accordance with Japan's Railway Business Act, Nankai is a Category-2 operator between Kansai Airport Station and Rinku Town Station.
