= Izumisano Station =

Railway station in Izumisano, Osaka Prefecture, Japan

Izumisano Station 泉佐野駅
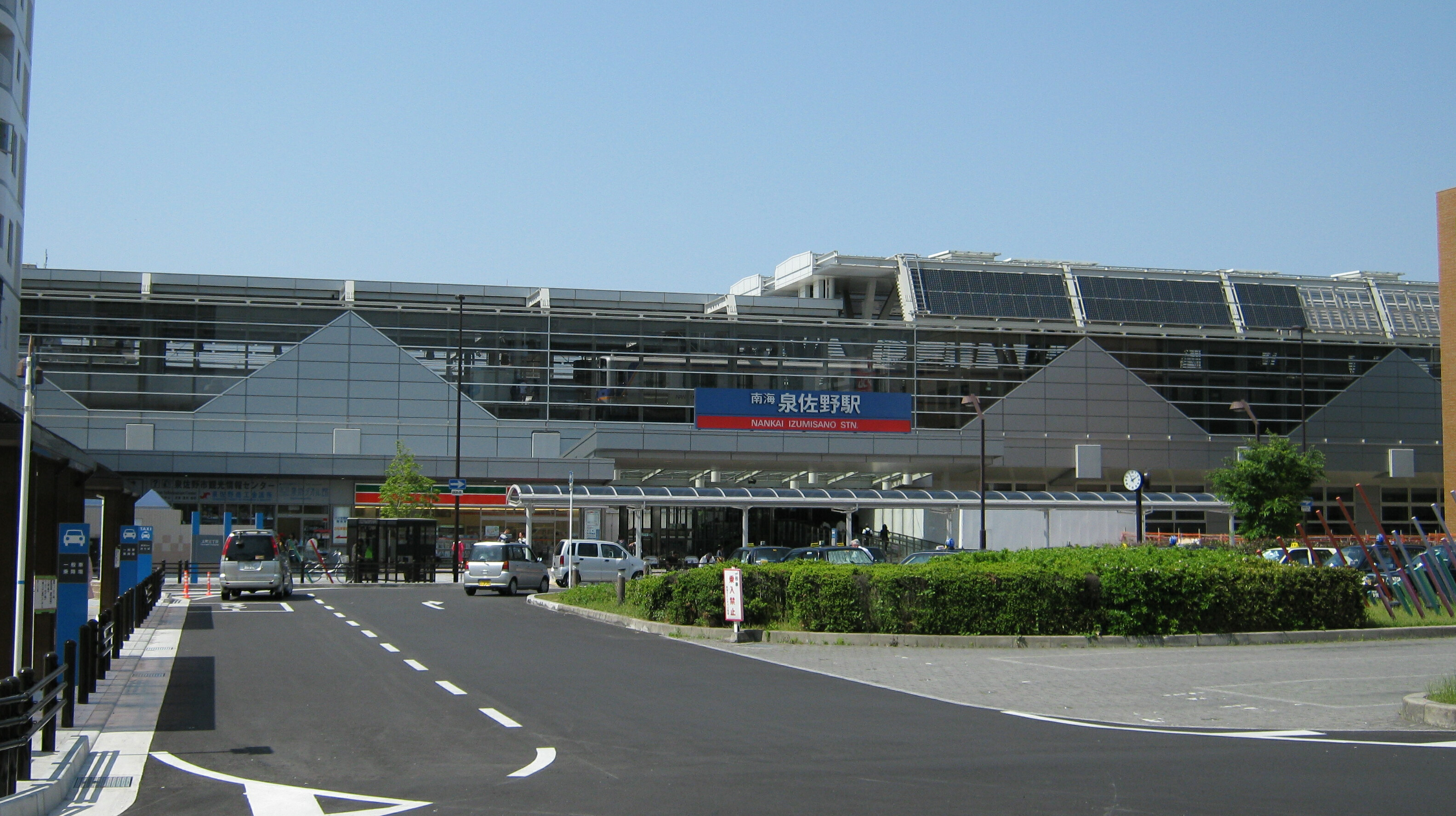
- Izumisano Station east entrance in May 2009

General information
- Location: 3-11-41 Uemachi, Izumisano-shi, Osaka-fu 598-0007; Japan
- Coordinates: 34°24′40.57″N 135°19′1.56″E
- Operator: Nankai Electric Railway
- Lines: Nankai Main Line; Airport Line
- Distance: 34.0 km from Namba
- Platforms: 3 island platforms
- Tracks: 4
- Connections: Bus terminal

Other information
- Station code: NK30
- Website: Official website

History
- Opened: 1 October 1897; 128 years ago
- Former names: Sano (until 1948)

Passengers
- FY2019: 24,520 daily

Services
Preceding station	Nankai Electric Railway	Following station
Iharanosato towards Namba	Nankai Main Line Local	Hagurazaki towards Wakayamashi
Iharanosato towards Namba	Nankai Main Line Semi-Express	Hagurazaki One-way operation
Kaizuka towards Namba	Nankai Main Line Sub. Express	Hagurazaki towards Wakayamashi
Kaizuka towards Namba	Nankai Main Line Airport Express	through to Airport Line
Kaizuka towards Namba	Nankai Main Line Express	Ozaki towards Wakayamashi
through to Nankai Main Line	Airport Line Local Airport Express	Rinkū Town towards Kansai Airport
Kishiwada towards Namba	Southern	Ozaki towards Wakayamashi or Wakayamakō
Tengachaya towards Namba	Rapi:t α	Rinkū Town towards Kansai Airport
Kishiwada towards Namba	Rapi:t β	Rinkū Town towards Kansai Airport
Location
- Location within Osaka Prefecture Location within Japan

Izumisano Station (泉佐野駅, Izumisano-eki) is a junction passenger railway station located in the city of Izumisano, Osaka Prefecture, Japan, operated by the private railway operator Nankai Electric Railway. It has station number "NK30".

== Lines ==
Izumisano Station is served by the Nankai Main Line and is 34.0 kilometers (21.1 mi) from the terminus of the line at Namba. It is also the terminus of the 8.8-kilometer (5.5 mi) Nankai Airport Line to Kansai International Airport.

== Layout ==
The station consists of three elevated island platforms serving a total of four tracks. The center platform is used for getting off and changing trains from the northbound trains to the southbound ones, and is closed after 24:00.

=== Platforms ===
1-2	■ Nankai Main Line	for Wakayamashi
1-2	■ Nankai Airport Line	for Kansai Airport
3	■ Nankai Main Line	(alighting/transferring passengers)
3	■ Nankai Airport Line	(alighting/transferring passengers)
4	■ Nankai Main Line	(alighting/transferring passengers)
4	■ Nankai Airport Line	(alighting/transferring passengers)
5-6	■ Nankai Main Line	for Namba

== History ==
Izumisano Station opened on 1 October 1897 as Sano Station (佐野駅). The station name was changed to its present name on 1 April 1948.

== Passenger statistics ==
In fiscal 2019, the station was used by an average of 24,520 passengers daily.

== Surrounding area ==
- Izumisano City Hall
- Izumisano City Cultural Center
- Osaka Prefectural Sano High School of Technology
- Osaka Prefectural Sano High School

== See also ==
- List of railway stations in Japan
