= Rapi:t =

Airport rail link serving Osaka, Japan

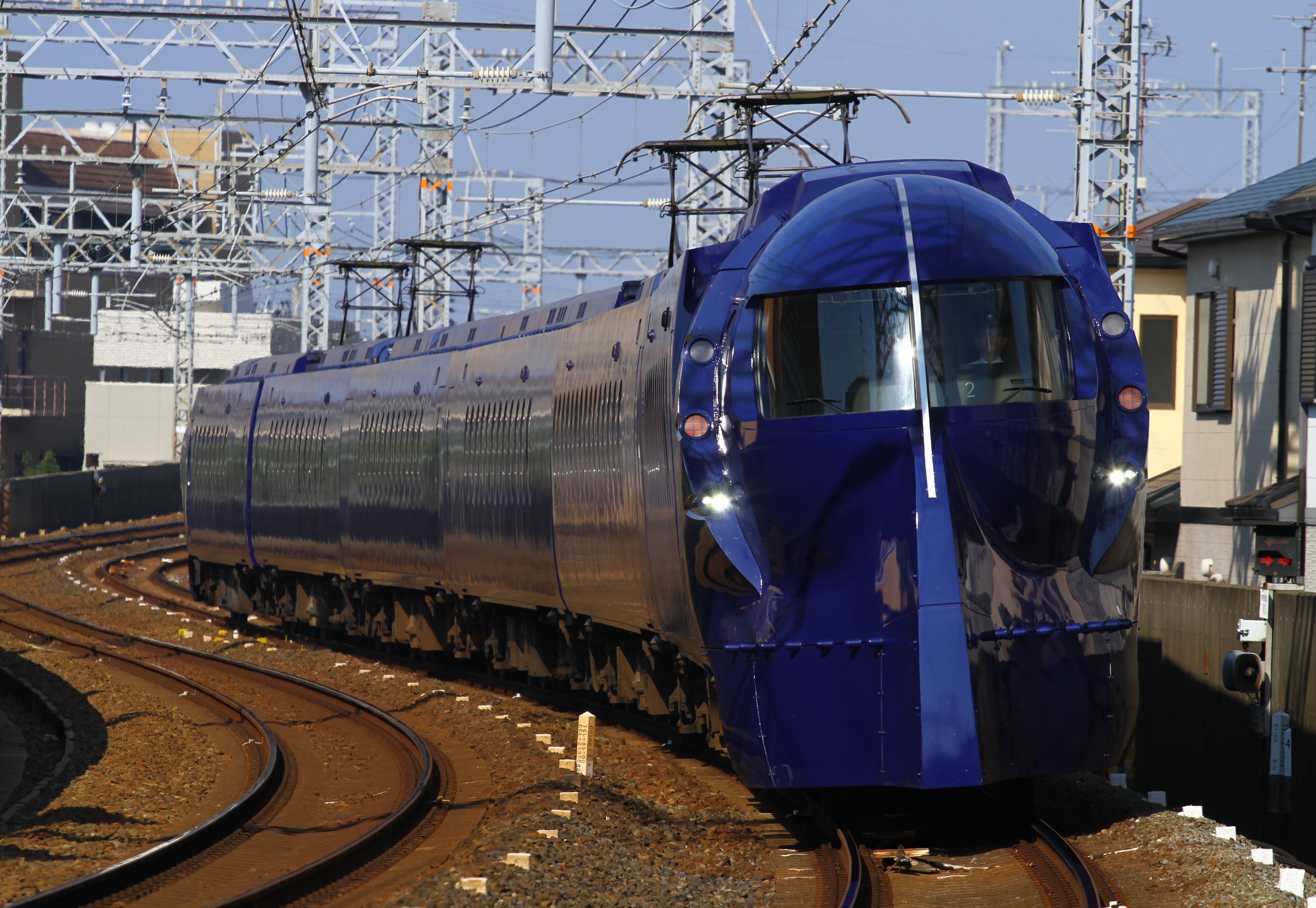
- A Nankai 50000 series Rapi:t train in October 2017

Overview
- Service type: Airport rail link (Limited express)
- Status: Operating
- Locale: Osaka Prefecture, Japan
- First service: 4 September 1994
- Current operator(s): Nankai Electric Railway Co., Ltd.

Route
- Termini: Namba; Kansai Airport
- Stops: 4 (α services for Airport); 6 (β services)
- Line(s) used: Nankai Main Line, Airport Line

Technical
- Rolling stock: 50000 series EMUs
- Track gauge: 1,067 mm (3 ft 6 in)
- Electrification: 1,500 V DC, overhead line
- Operating speed: 120 km/h (75 mph)

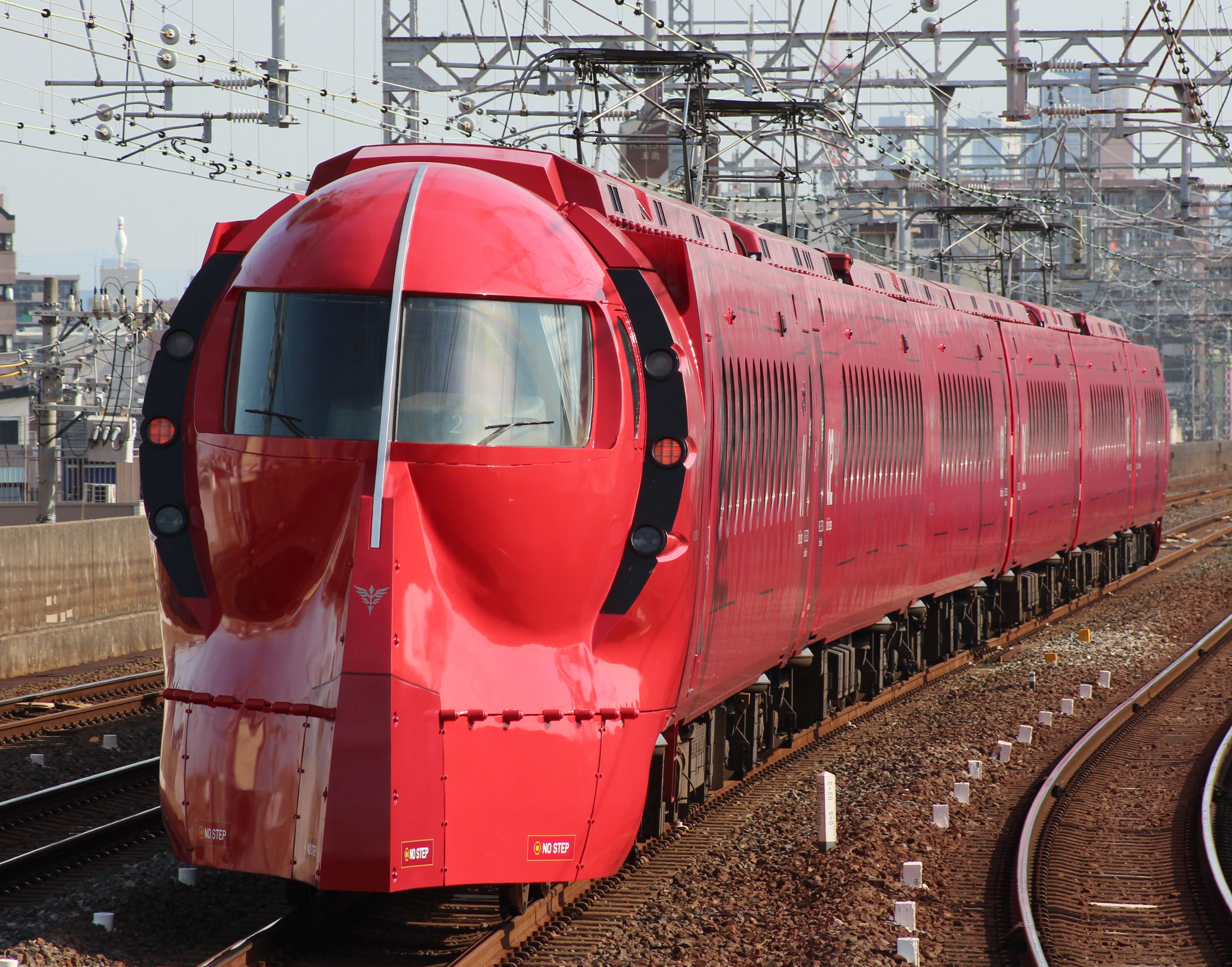
A Rapi:t train repainted in a red Gundam Neo Zeon livery to mark the 20th anniversary

Rapi:t (ラピート, rapiito; stylized as rapiːt) is a limited express train service between Kansai International Airport and Namba Station in Osaka, Japan. It is operated by Nankai Electric Railway, and the train service uses the Nankai Main Line and the Airport Line.

The futuristic and retro-style six-car Rapi:t train sets, officially designated as the Nankai 50000 series, were designed by architect Wakabayashi Hiroyuki and won the Blue Ribbon Prize in 1995, one year after entering service..

== Station stops ==
There are two classes of Rapi:t services. Rapi:t β (beta) takes 37 minutes from Namba to Kansai Airport, stopping at Shin-Imamiya, Tengachaya, Sakai, Kishiwada, Izumisano, and Rinkū Town. Rapi:t α (alpha) takes 34 minutes, stopping at Shin-Imamiya, Tengachaya, Izumisano, and Rinku Town. All seats are reserved and non-smoking.

4 α trains depart Namba for Kansai Airport on weekday mornings (6:00, 7:00, 8:00, 9:00), and 6 depart Kansai Airport for Namba from 20:00 (2 per hour). β trains depart Namba for Kansai Airport every day, 1 per hour from 7:00 until 10:00 and 2 per hour from 10:00, and 1 or 2 depart Kansai Airport for Namba by 20:00.

- Rapi:t α: Namba Station - Shin-Imamiya Station - Tengachaya Station - Izumisano Station - Rinkū Town Station - Kansai Airport Station
- Rapi:t β: Namba Station - Shin-Imamiya Station - Tengachaya Station - Sakai Station - Kishiwada Station - Izumisano Station - Rinkū Town Station - Kansai Airport Station

== History ==
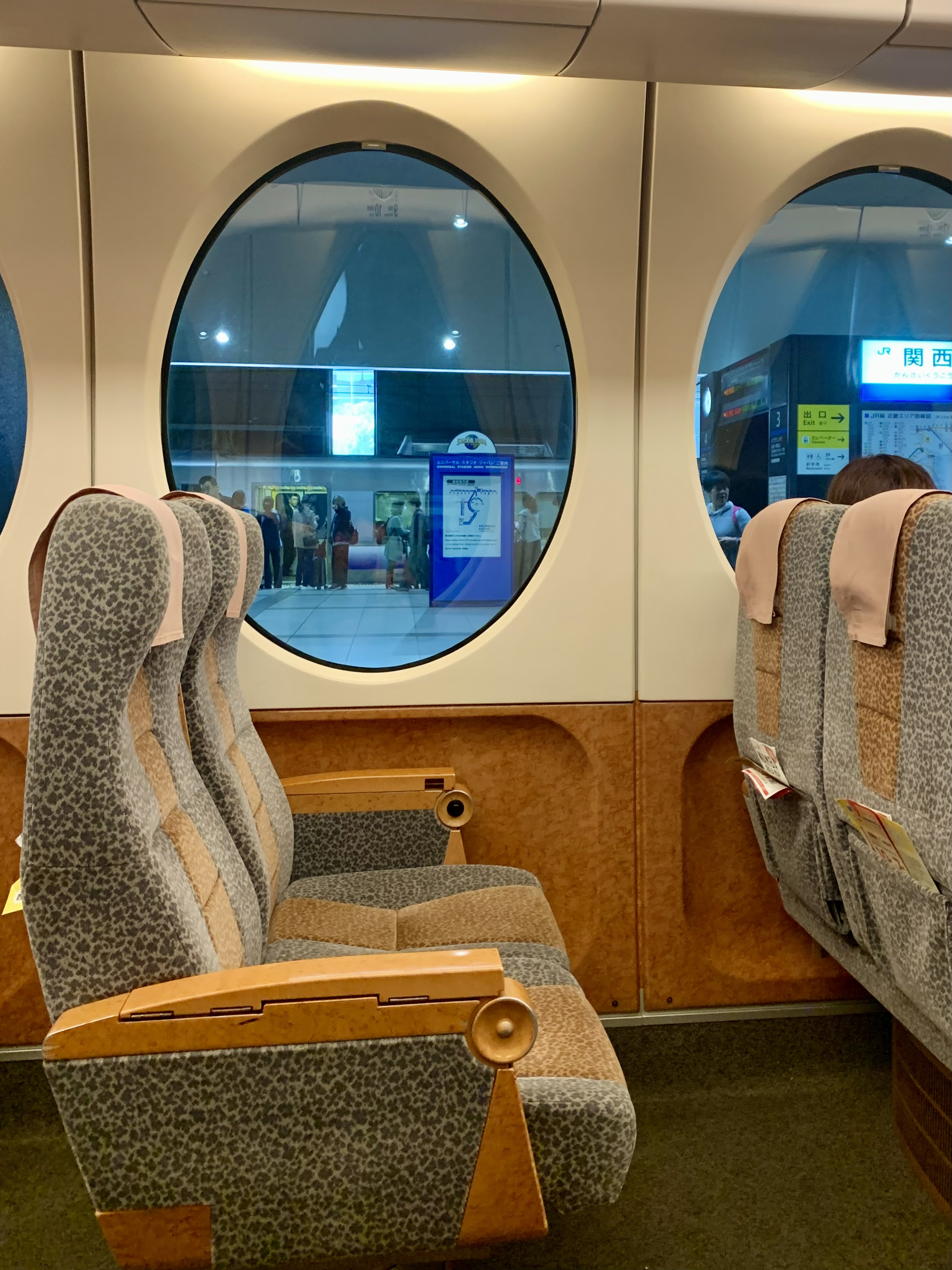
A Rapi:t train interior

The Rapi:t service was inaugurated on 4 September 1994 using 6-car Nankai 50000 series EMUs.

Rapi:t services were suspended on 4 September 2018 due to the effects of Typhoon Jebi causing damage to the airport and the Sky Gate Bridge R being damaged by an empty fuel tanker. Services to the airport were completely restored on 18 September 2018.

== See also ==
- Haruka, limited-express service operated by JR West to Kansai Airport
