= Izumisano =

Izumisano 泉佐野市
- City
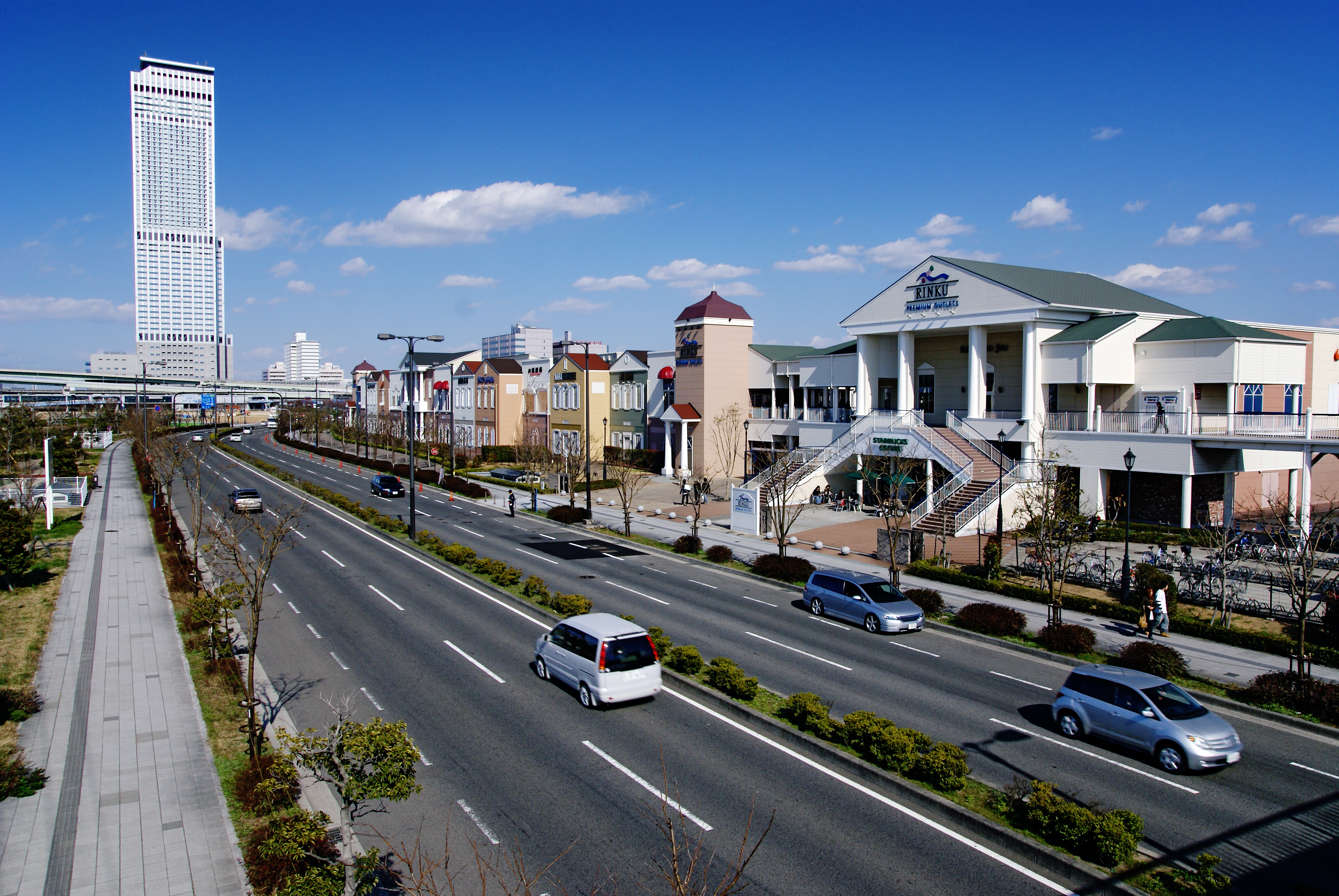

- Flag Emblem

- Location of Izumisano in Osaka Prefecture

- Location in Japan
- Coordinates: 34°24′25″N 135°19′39″E
- Country: Japan
- Region: Kansai
- Prefecture: Osaka

Government
  - Mayor: Hiroyasu Chiyomatsu

Area
  - Total: 56.51 km^{2} (21.82 sq mi)

Population (February 29, 2024)
  - Total: 99,008
  - Density: 1,752/km^{2} (4,538/sq mi)
- Time zone: UTC+09:00 (JST)
- City hall address: 1-295-3, Ichiba Higashi, Izumisano-shi, Ōsaka-fu 598-8550
- Website: Official website
- Symbols
- Flower: Sasayuri (Lilium japonicum)
- Tree: Ginkgo

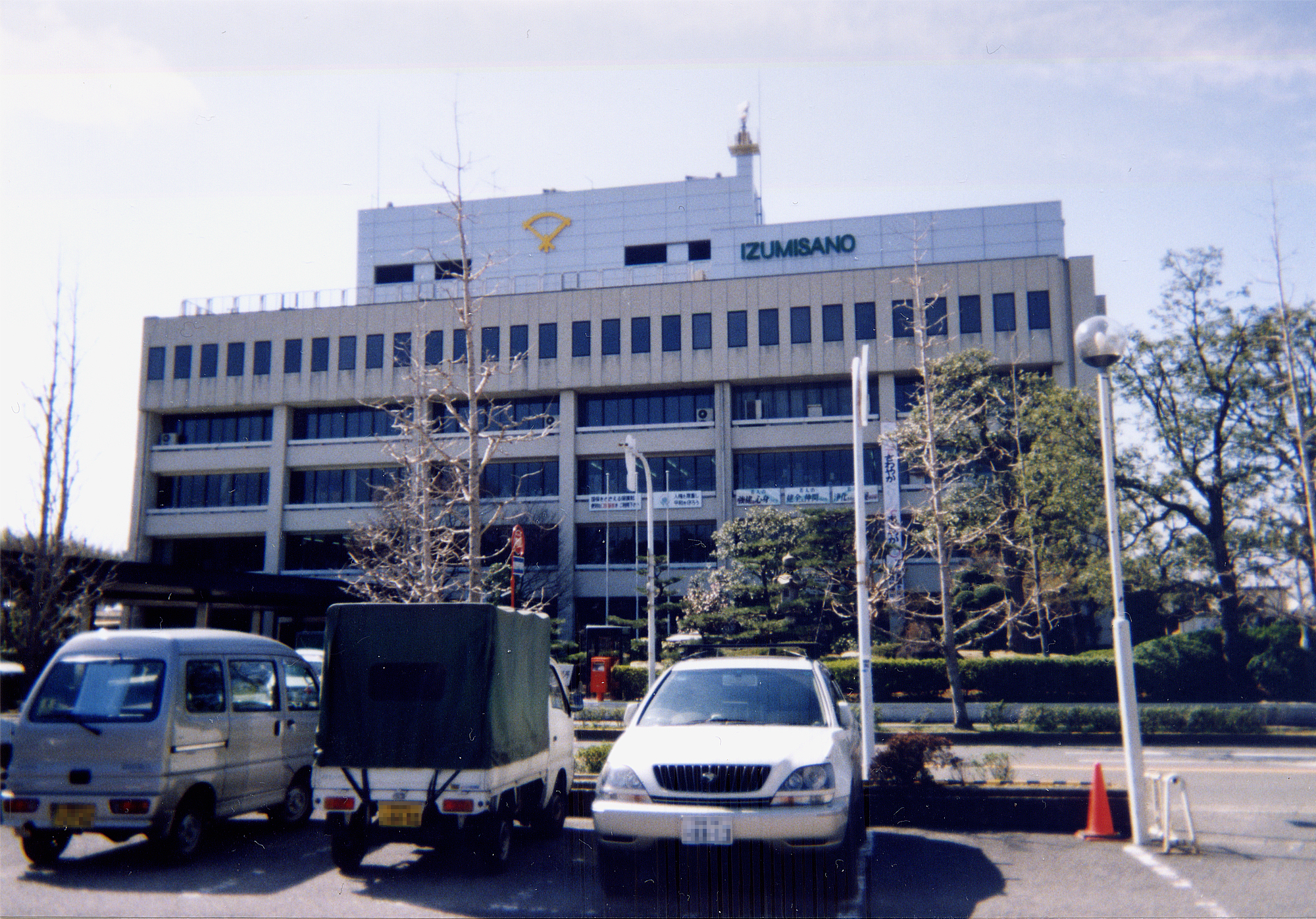
Izumisano City Hall

Izumisano (泉佐野市, Izumisano-shi; Japanese pronunciation: [ì.(d͡)zɨ́.mʲí.sä̀.nò̞, -sä́.nó̞.ɕì]) is a city located in Osaka Prefecture, Japan. As of 29 February 2024, the city had an estimated population of 99,008 in 49,638 households and a population density of 1800 persons per km^{2}. The total area of the city is 56.51 square kilometres (21.82 sq mi).

== Geography ==
Izumisano is located approximately halfway between Osaka City and Wakayama City, bordered by Osaka Bay to the northwest and the Izumi Mountains and Kongō-Ikoma-Kisen Quasi-National Park to the south. The northern third of Kansai International Airport is located within the city limits on an artificial island offshore, and the area within Izumisano includes the connecting bridge to the mainland.

=== Neighboring municipalities ===
Osaka Prefecture

- Kaizuka
- Kumatori
- Sennan
- Tajiri

Wakayama Prefecture

- Kinokawa

== Climate ==
Izumisano has a Humid subtropical climate (Köppen Cfa) characterized by warm summers and cool winters with light to no snowfall. The average annual temperature in Izumisano is 15.1 °C. The average annual rainfall is 1488 mm with September as the wettest month. The temperatures are highest on average in August, at around 25.6 °C, and lowest in January, at around 4.4 °C.

== Demographics ==
Per Japanese census data, the population of Izumisano has increased steadily from the year 1920 to the year 1980 and has leveled off since.

Historical population
Year	Pop.	±%
1920	26,526	—
1930	33,267	+25.4%
1940	40,152	+20.7%
1950	47,039	+17.2%
1960	56,827	+20.8%
1970	77,000	+35.5%
1980	90,684	+17.8%
1990	88,866	−2.0%
2000	96,064	+8.1%
2010	100,830	+5.0%

== History ==
The area of the modern city of Izumisano was within ancient Izumi Province. The area also had many Kofun period burial mounds from the 5th to 7th century AD. From the Kamakura to the Muromachi period a large portion of the area was controlled by Hine-no-shō, a large landed estate owned by the Kujō family of Court nobility. In the Edo Period, much of the city area was controlled by Kishiwada Domain with smaller portions controlled directly by the Tokugawa shogunate.

After the Meiji restoration, the village of Sano established within Hine District with the creation of the modern municipalities system on April 1, 1889. On April 1, 1896, the area became part of Sennan District, Osaka. Sano was elevated to town status on October 1, 1911. Sano annexed the village of Kitanakado on April 1, 1937. On April 1, 1948, Sano was promoted to city status. To avoid confusion with Sano, Tochigi, the city name was chosen to be Izumisano.On April 1, 1954, the city expanded to its present area by annexing the neighboring villages of Minaminakadori, Nagataki, Kaminogo, Hineno and Otsuchi. Kansai International Airport was opened on April 4, 1994, with Rinku Town commercial development opening in 1995. Izumisano entered into discussions to merge with Sennan, Misaki, Hannan and Tajiri to form the city of "Sennanshu" (南泉州市) from 2001 to 2004; however, per a public referendum, only Misaki was in favor of the merger and the plans were abandoned.

== Government ==
Izumisano has a mayor-council form of government with a directly elected mayor and a unicameral city council of 18 members. Izumisano collectively with the cities of Kaizuka, Sennan, and the smaller municipalities of Sen'nan District contributes two members to the Osaka Prefectural Assembly. In terms of national politics, the city is part of Osaka 19th district of the lower house of the Diet of Japan.

== Economy ==
The main industries of Izumisano remain food-related: agriculture, commercial fishing and food processing. The main crops are onions, eggplants, cabbage, and broccoli. Textile production is also important, with the city accounting for 47% of domestic towel production. Due to the proximity of Kansai International Airport, airport-support and aviation-related industries have increased. Peach Aviation has its head office in Izumisano. The city is also home to the 256-metre (840 ft) Rinku Gate Tower Building, the third tallest building in Japan.

== Education ==
Izumisano has 13 public elementary schools and five public middle schools operated by the city government and three public high schools operated by the Osaka Prefectural Department of Education. The Rinku campus of the Osaka Prefecture University is also located at Izumisano.

== Transportation ==
=== Airport ===
- Kansai International Airport

=== Railway ===
JR West – Hanwa Line

- Higashi-Sano - < Kumatori> - Hineno - Nagataki

JR West – Kansai Airport Line

- Hineno - Rinkū Town

Nankai Electric Railway - Nankai Main Line

- Tsuruhara - Iharanosato - Izumisano - Hagurazaki

Nankai Electric Railway - Nankai Airport Line

- Izumisano - Rinkū Town

=== Highway ===
- Hanshin Expressway
- Hanwa Expressway
- Kansai-Kūkō Expressway
- National Route 26
- National Route 170
- National Route 481

== Sister cities ==
- Xuhui District and Baoshan District, Shanghai, China
- Töv Province, Mongolia
- Xindu District, Chengdu, China
- Gulu, Uganda
- Marília, São Paulo, Brazil
- Daly City, California, United States
- La Spezia, Italy

== Local attractions ==
- Hine Jinja
- Hine-no-shō sites, National Historic Site
- Jigen-in temple
- Site of the Battle of Kashii

== Notable people from Izumisano ==
- Yumi Asō, actress
- Hineno Hironari, samurai
- Fumitaka Kitatani, football player
- Kenshiro Matsunami, politician of the Liberal Democratic Party
- Ryotaro Meshino, football player
- Takumi Minamino, football player
- Takashi Nagayasu, politician of the Democratic Party of Japan
- Baikei Uehira, master calligrapher

== Gallery ==
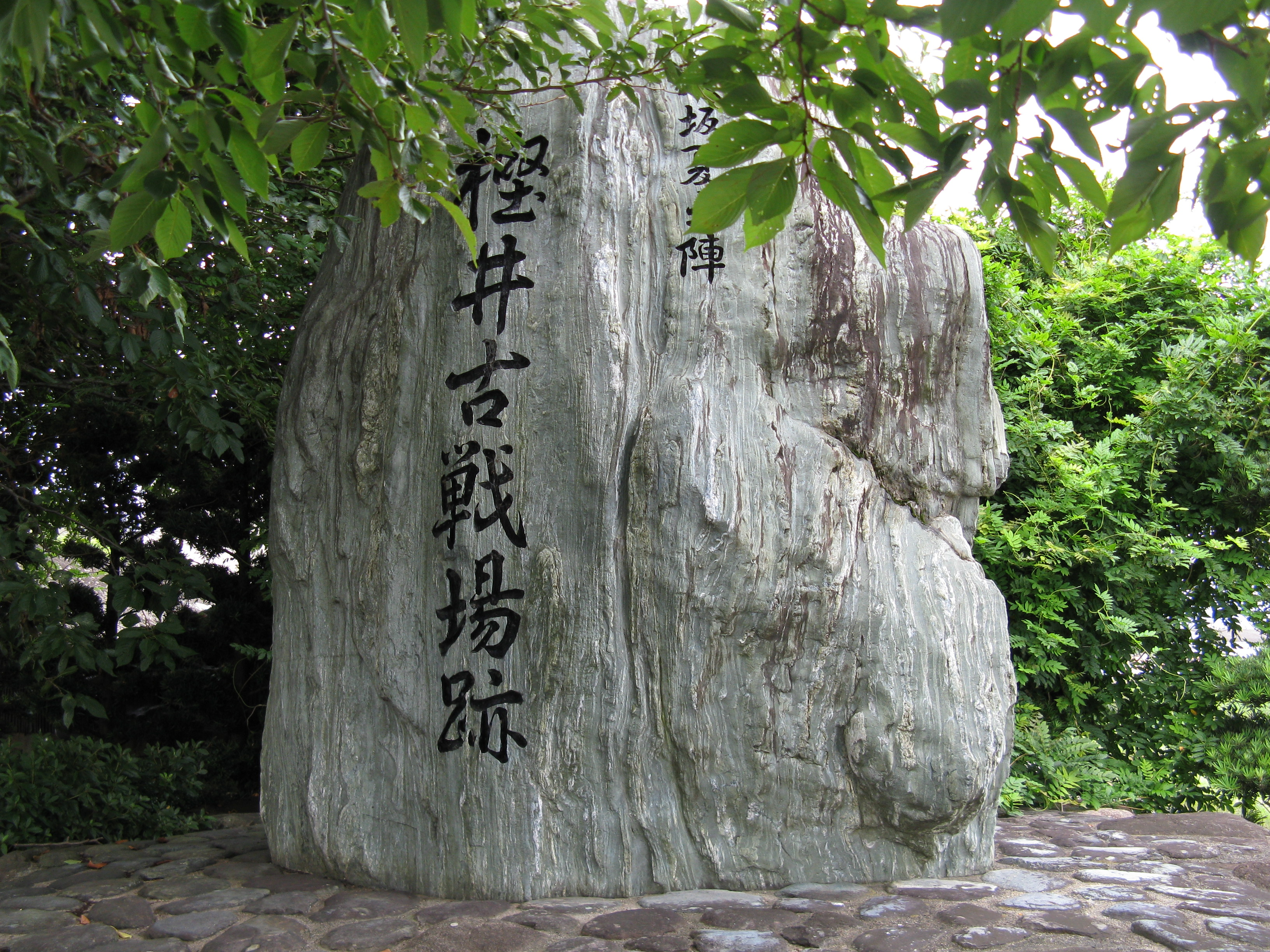
Site of the Battle of Kashii

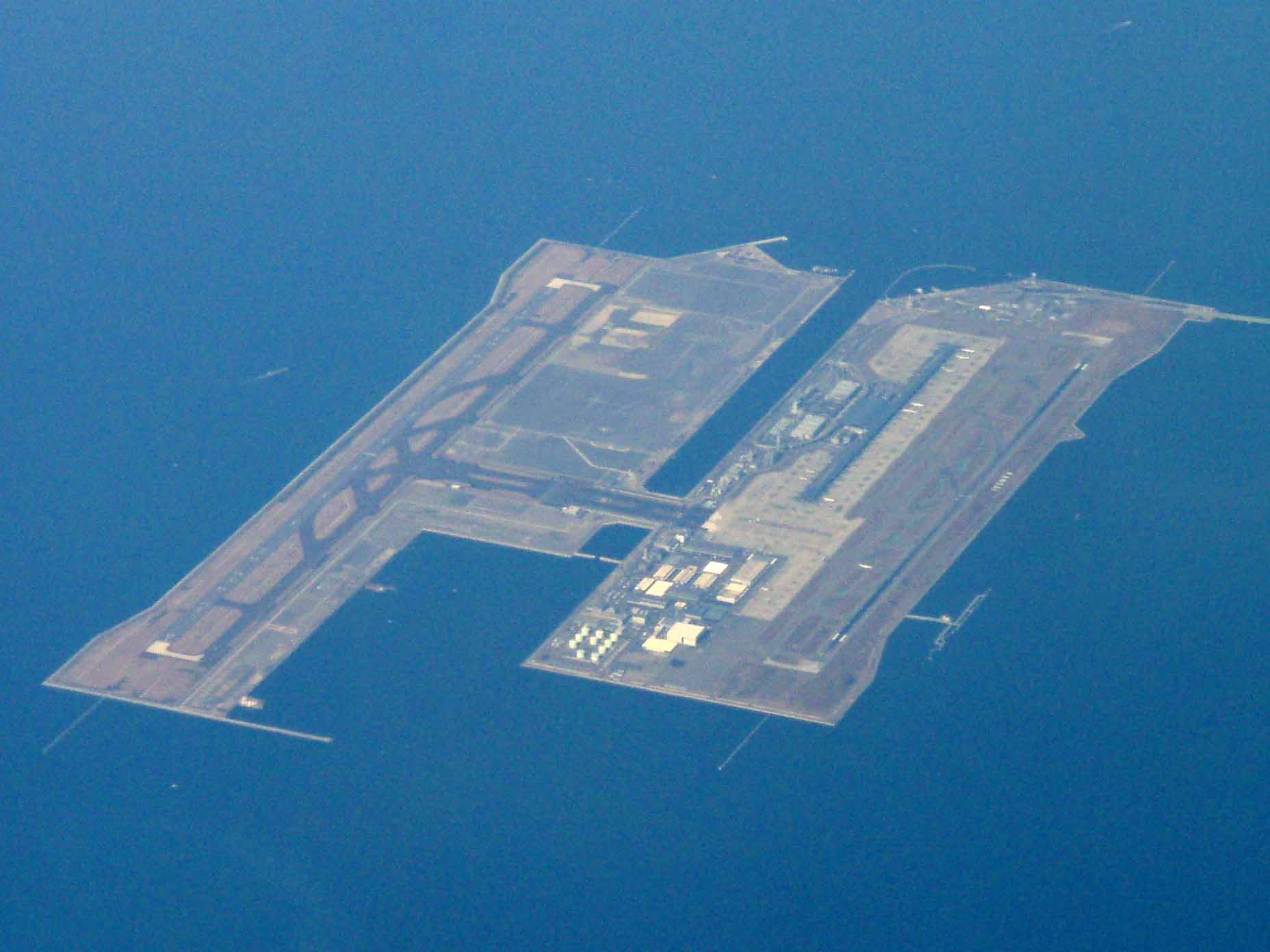
Kansai International Airport

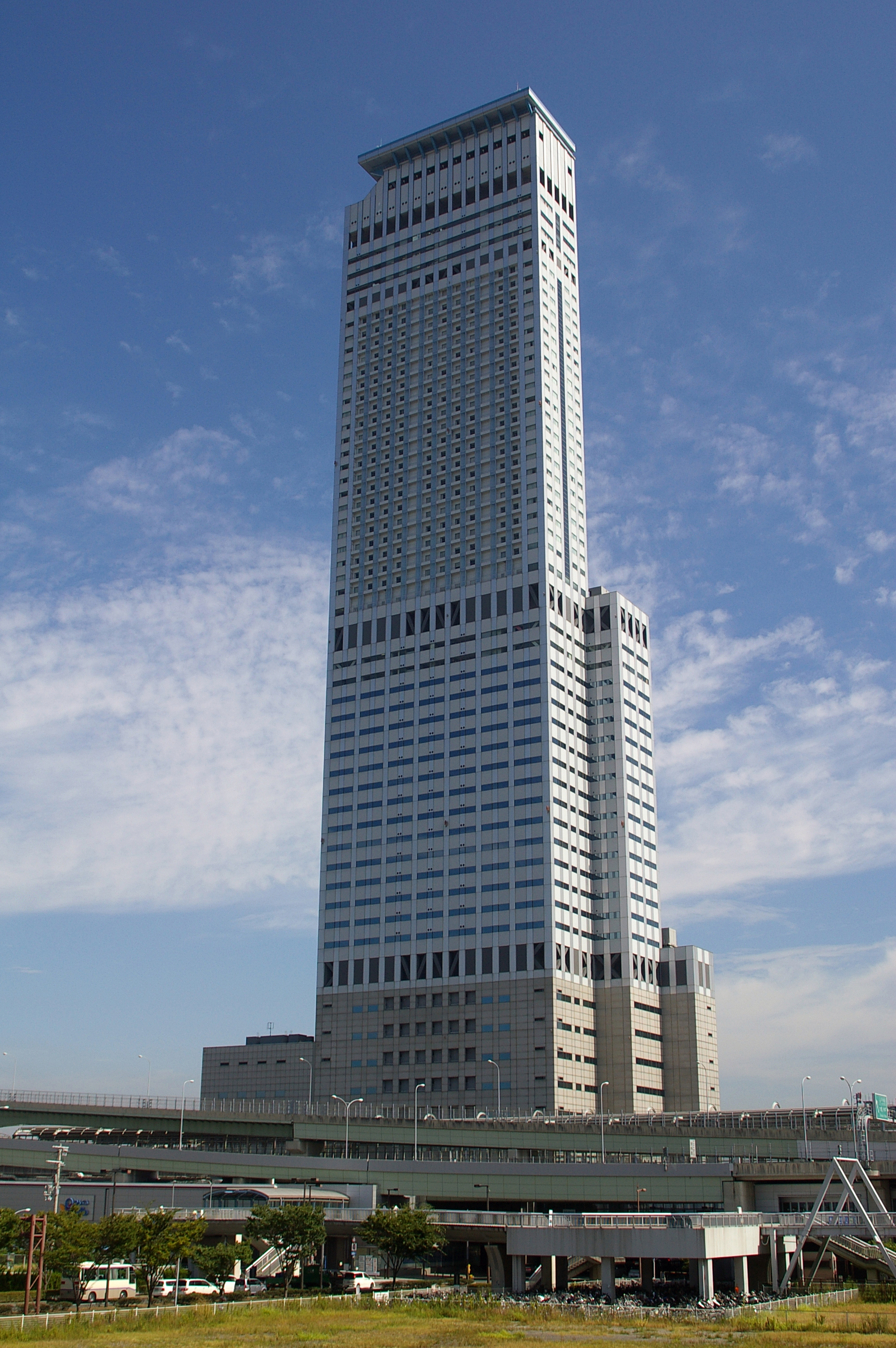
Rinku Gate Tower
