= Kansai Airport Station =

Railway station in Tajiri, Osaka Prefecture, Japan

Kansai Airport Station 関西空港駅
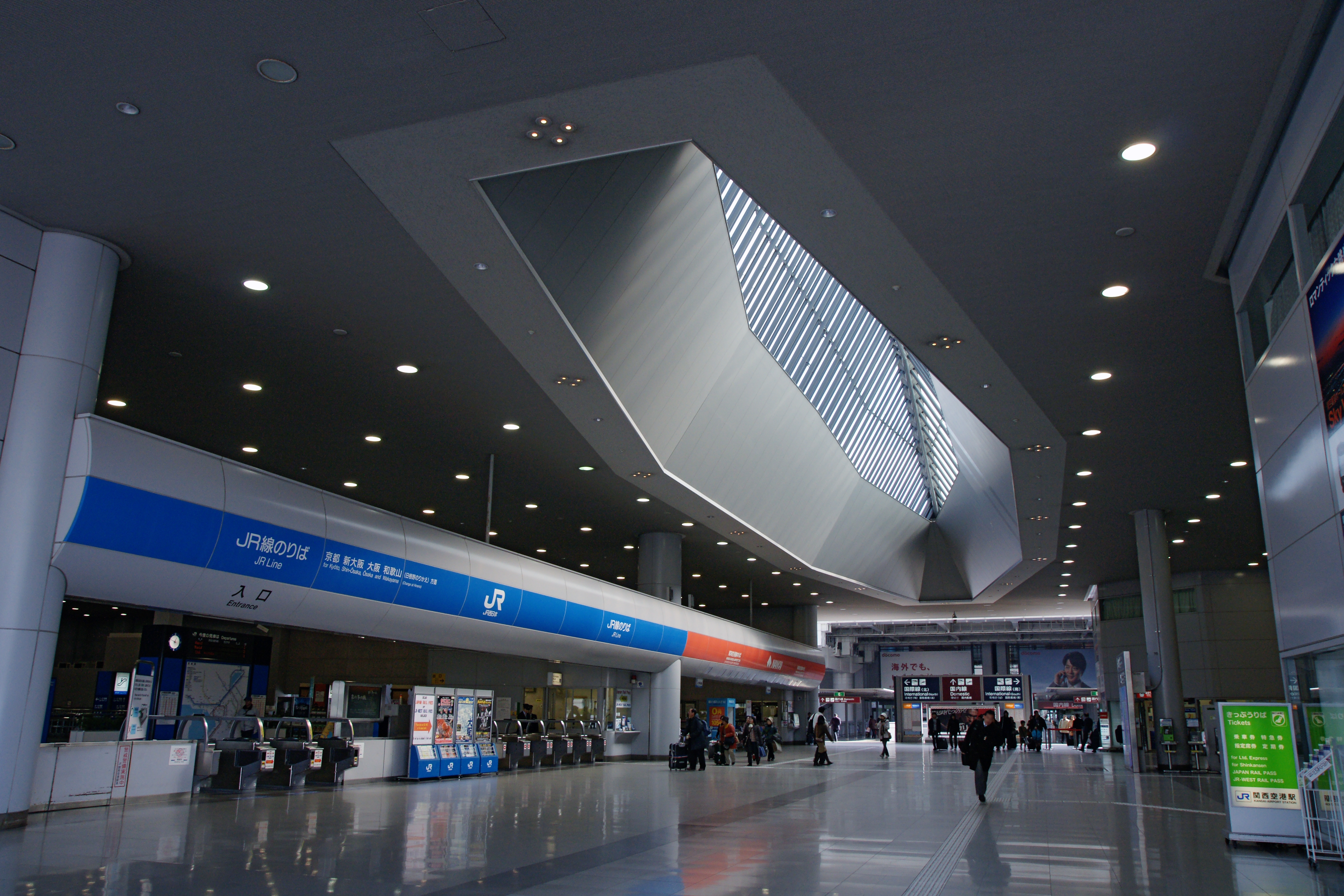
- Concourse of Kansai Airport Station. The blue ticket gates lead to JR West tracks, while the orange ticket gates lead to Nankai Electric Railway tracks.

General information
- Location: 1 Senshukukonaka, Tajiri-cho, Sennan-gun, Osaka-fu 549-0011; Japan
- Coordinates: 34°26′9.28″N 135°14′36.57″E
- Owner: New Kansai International Airport Co., Ltd.
- Operator: Nankai Electric Railway; JR West
- Lines: Nankai Airport Line; S Kansai Airport Line
- Distance: 42.8 km (26.6 mi) to Nanba
- Platforms: 2 island platforms
- Tracks: 4
- Connections: Kansai International Airport

Construction
- Structure type: At grade

Other information
- Station code: NK32 (Nankai); JR-S47 (JR-West)

History
- Opened: 15 June 1994; 32 years ago

Passengers
- 2019: 14,360 daily (JR); 16,698 daily (Nankai)

Services
Preceding station	JR West	Following station
Terminus	Kansai Airport Line Local Kansai Airport Rapid Direct Rapid	Rinkū-town JR-S46 towards Hineno
Terminus	Haruka	Tennōji JR-R20 towards Kyoto or Yasu
Terminus	Haruka	Hineno JR-S45 (some trains) towards Kyoto or Yasu
Preceding station	Nankai Electric Railway	Following station
Rinkū-town NK31 towards Izumisano	Airport Line Local Airport Express	Terminus
Rinkū-town NK31 towards Namba	Rapi:t	Terminus
Location
- Location within Osaka Prefecture Location within Kansai region Location within Japan

Kansai Airport Station (関西空港駅, Kansaikūkō-eki) is a ground level passenger railway station shared by Nankai Electric Railway and West Japan Railway Company (JR West) located at Kansai International Airport in the town of Tajiri, Sennan District, Osaka Prefecture, Japan. The northern end of the platforms extends into the city of Izumisano.

== Layout ==
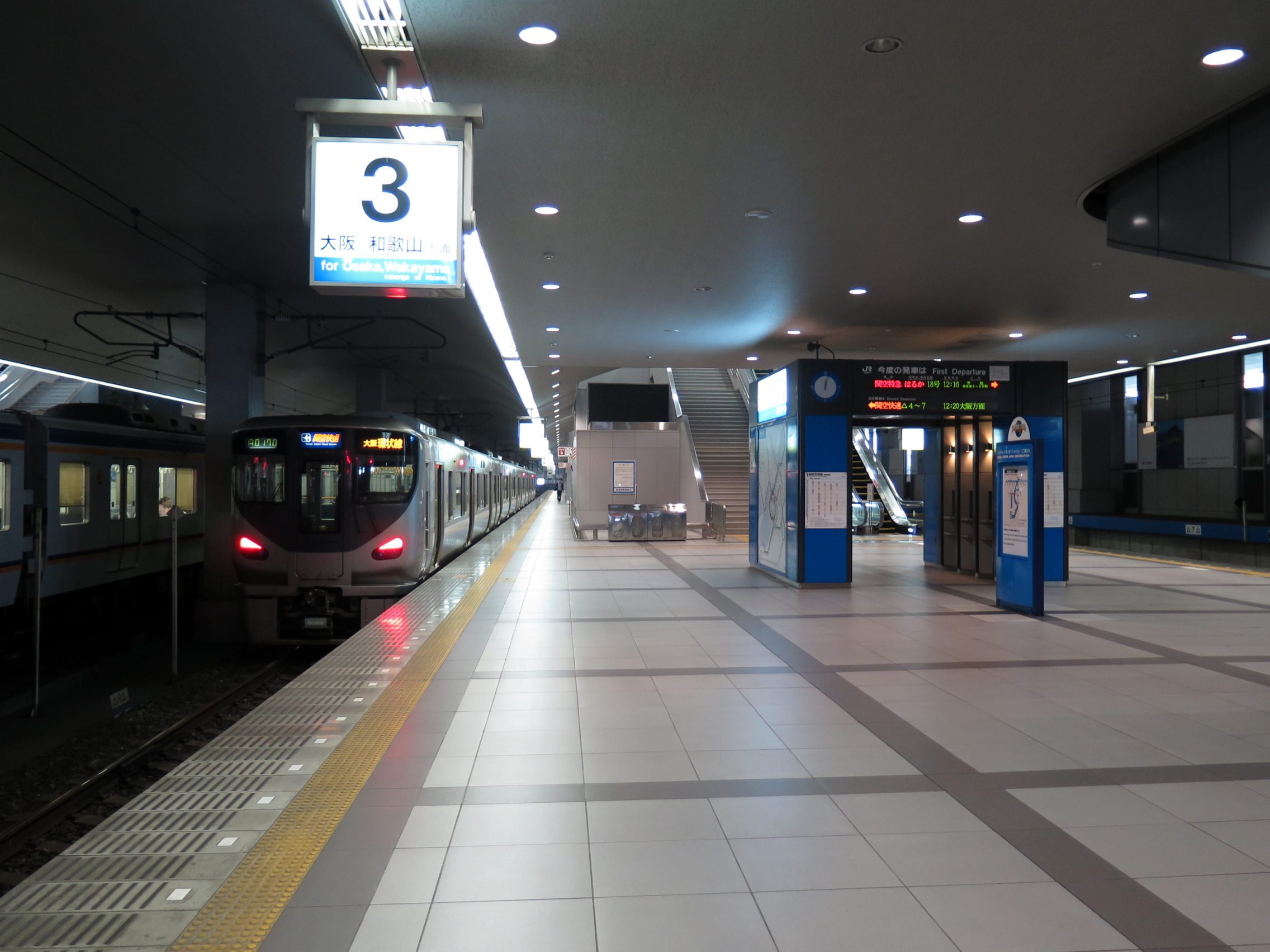
A JR West Kansai Airport Line train arriving at Platform 3. Platform 4 is on the right.

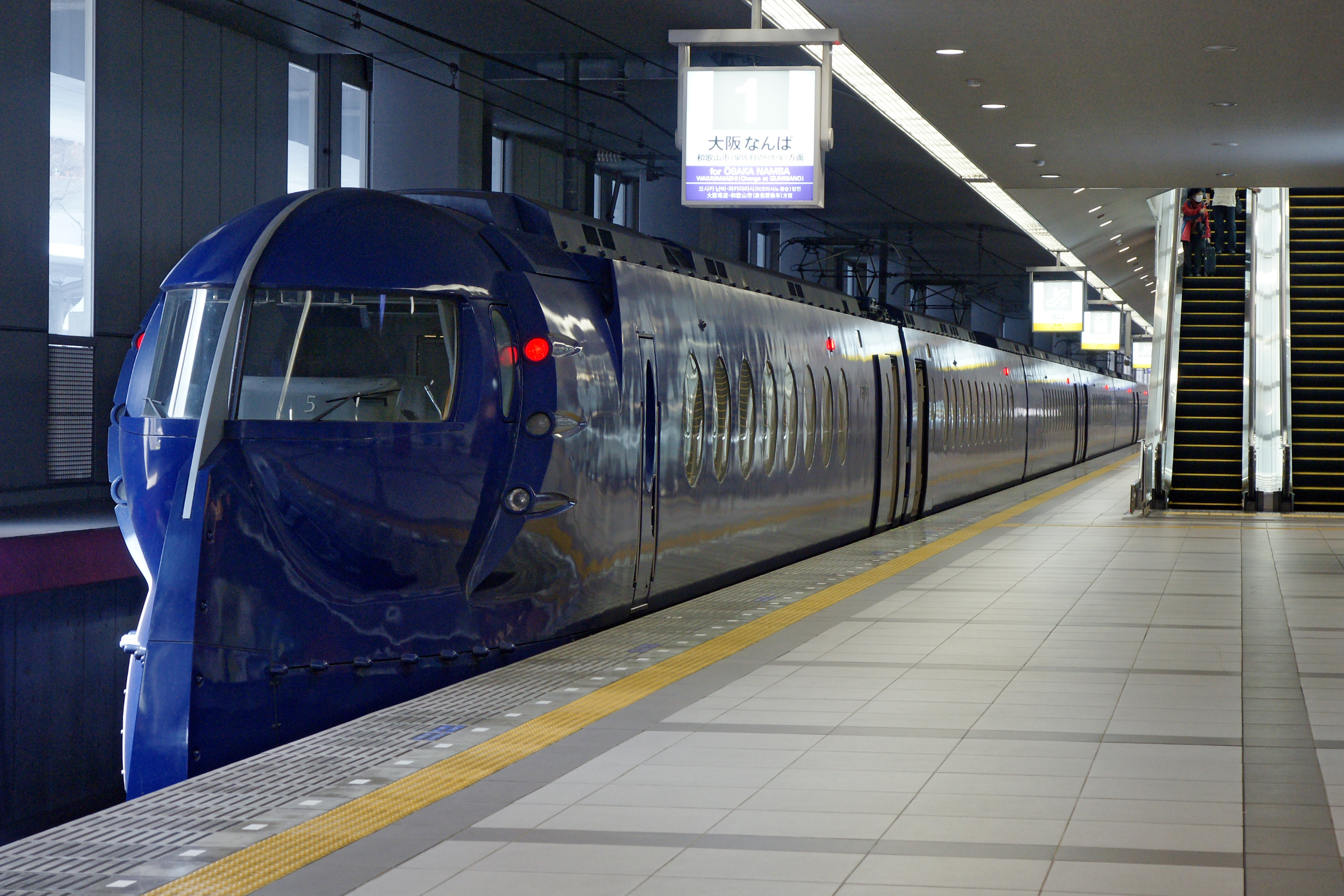
Nankai Railway Airport Limited Express "Rapi:t" at Platform 1

The station has two island platforms, serving two tracks for each railway company. Each railway line concourse also has three elevators for the convenience of passengers traveling with bulky baggage.

=== Platforms ===
1-2	■ Nankai Railway Airport Line	for Izumisano and Namba; Connecting train service to Wakayamashi available at Izumisano
3	■ JR West Kansai Airport Line	Kansai Airport and Direct Rapid Services for Tennōji and Osaka; Shuttle trains for Hineno; Connecting train service to Wakayama available at Hineno
4	■ JR West Kansai Airport Line	Limited express trains "Haruka" for Tennōji, Ōsaka, Shin-Ōsaka and Kyōto; Kansai Airport and Direct Rapid Services for Tennōji and Osaka; Shuttle trains for Hineno

- Nankai Rapi:t airport limited express trains depart mainly from Track 2.
- Kansai Airport Limited Express Haruka trains depart mainly from Track 4.

== History ==
The station opened on June 15, 1994, two and a half months before the opening of the airport. During this initial period, the station was open to the public; however only airport employees and related personnel were allowed to leave the station concourse (a similar situation to Umi-Shibaura Station in Tokyo).

Since the mid-2000s, there have been plans to link Kansai Airport Station and central Osaka by a new underground railway line tentatively called the Naniwasuji Line, which would run between Namba and Shin-Osaka. In 2010, government calculations indicated that the new line would reduce travel time from Umeda to Kansai Airport to as little as 41 minutes, versus the current 56–68 minutes. The station is also one of the proposed terminals for the high-speed Hokuriku Shinkansen line.

Station numbering was introduced to the JR Kansai Airport Line in March 2018 with Kansai Airport being assigned station number JR-S47.

The station was closed on 4 September 2018 due to the effects of Typhoon Jebi causing flooding around the airport complex and the Sky Gate Bridge R being damaged by an empty fuel tanker. It was reopened on 18 September 2018 following the resumption of train services to the airport.

== Passenger statistics ==
In fiscal 2019, the JR West portion of the station was used by an average of 14,360 passengers daily (boarding passengers only), while the Nankai portion of the station was used by an average of 16,698 passengers daily during the same period..

== Surrounding area ==
- Kansai International Airport
- Hotel Nikko Kansai Airport
  - Aeroplaza

== See also ==
- List of railway stations in Japan
