= Kada =

Kada or KADA may refer to:

== Places ==
- Kada, Tibet, a village
- Kada Glacier, Tibet - see Lhagba La
- Kada, Togo, a village
- Kada, Maharashtra, a village in India

== People ==
- Kada (surname)
- Kada Delić (born 1965), race walker
- Kada Siddha

== KADA ==
- KADA (AM), a radio station (1230 AM) licensed to Ada, Oklahoma, United States
- KADA-FM, a radio station (99.3 FM) licensed to Ada, Oklahoma, United States
- Kwajalein Atoll Development Authority- see Kwajalein Atoll

== Other uses ==
- Kada (jewellery), a type of bracelet popular in India
- Kada Line, a railway line in Wakayama Prefecture, Japan
- Kada Station, a train station in Wakayama, Wakayama Prefecture

== See also ==
- Qada (disambiguation)
- Joe Cada (born 1987), American poker player
