= KADA-FM =

- Ada, Oklahoma; United States
- Frequency: 99.3 MHz
- Branding: Cool 99.3

Programming
- Format: Classic hits

Ownership
- Owner: Chickasaw Nation
- Sister stations: KADA, KCNP, KTLS-FM, KXFC, KYKC

History
- First air date: 1980
- Former call signs: KASX (1979–1987); KFIX (1987–1988)
- Call sign meaning: Ada

Technical information
- Licensing authority: FCC
- Facility ID: 33498
- Class: A
- ERP: 5,500 watts
- HAAT: 84.2 meters (276 ft)
- Transmitter coordinates: 34°42′31″N 96°44′24″W

Links
- Public license information: Public file; LMS
- Webcast: Listen live
- Website: kadaradio.net

KADA-FM (99.3 FM, "Cool 99.3") is a radio station licensed to serve Ada, Oklahoma, US. The station, established in 1980, is currently owned by the Chickasaw Nation.

KADA-FM broadcasts a classic hits music format.

== History ==
This station received its original construction permit from the Federal Communications Commission on July 20, 1979. The new station was assigned the KASX call sign by the FCC on October 22, 1979. KASX received its license to cover from the FCC on June 2, 1980.

Throughout the 1980s, KASX-FM aired a country format. For a rare reason, the station is the Ardmore's area affiliate of Rick Dees Weekly Top 40. In July 1987, Ada Broadcasting, Inc. reached an agreement to sell KASX to DeBrine Communications, Inc. The deal was approved by the FCC on September 9, 1987, and the transaction was consummated on September 17, 1987. The new owners had the FCC change the station's call sign to KFIX on November 1, 1987.

This ownership change proved short-lived as DeBrine Communications, Inc. announced in April 1988 that they had agreed to sell KFIX to Pontotoc County Broadcasting, Inc. The deal was approved by the FCC on July 14, 1988, and the transaction was consummated on July 18, 1988. The call sign change also proved short-lived as the station was assigned KADA-FM on August 1, 1988.

In March 1996, Pontotoc County Broadcasting, Inc. reached an agreement to sell KADA-FM to the Chickasaw Nation. The deal was approved by the FCC on May 30, 1996, and the transaction was consummated on August 9, 1996.

Previous logo
