= KADA (AM) =

- Ada, Oklahoma; United States
- Frequency: 1230 kHz
- Branding: Pirate Radio 102.3

Programming
- Format: Alternative rock

Ownership
- Owner: The Chickasaw Nation
- Sister stations: KADA-FM, KCNP, KTLS-FM, KXFC, KYKC

History
- First air date: September 27, 1934
- Call sign meaning: Ada, Oklahoma

Technical information
- Licensing authority: FCC
- Facility ID: 33259
- Class: C
- Power: 1,000 watts unlimited
- Transmitter coordinates: 34°47′6.00″N 96°40′44.00″W
- Translator: 102.3 K272FW (Ada)

Links
- Public license information: Public file; LMS
- Website: pirateradioada.net

KADA (1230 kHz, "Pirate Radio 102.3") is an AM radio station broadcasting an alternative rock format. Licensed to Ada, Oklahoma, United States, the station (and its sister stations, KADA-FM 99.3, KYKC 100.1, KCNP 89.5, KXFC 105.5, and KTLS 106.5) are owned by The Chickasaw Nation.

== History ==
KADA was a charter member of the Oklahoma Network when it was formed in 1937.

Previous logo

On January 1, 2018, KADA changed formats from sports to active rock, branded as "Pirate Radio 102.3" (simulcast on FM translator K272FW/102.3-Ada).

== Translators ==
Broadcast translator for KADA
Call sign	Frequency	City of license	FID	ERP (W)	HAAT	Class	FCC info
K272FW	102.3 FM	Ada, Oklahoma	141870	250	69 m (226 ft)	D	LMS

== Notable programs ==
- 10:15 Club, with disc jockey Dan Owen (Owens), 1950
- Homemakers Music, with disc jockey Monte Bell, 1949–1954
- Just for Ladies, with disc jockey Betty Hughes Nolen, 1950
- Melody Roundup, with disc jockey Dan Owen (Owens), 1948
- Mystery Matinee, with disc jockey George P. Miller, 1949
- Songs of Range Capers, with disc jockey Bill Little, 1947
- Songs of the Range, with disc jockey Monte Bell, 1949–1954
- The Old Gold Review, with Rick Cody
- Trading Post

== Notable on-air personalities ==
- Douglas Edwards, newscaster, 1950s
- Monte Bell, sportscaster, 1951–1954
- Hilary Fry, newscaster, 1942
- Frank Hawkinson, newscaster, 1939
- Lillard Lee Hill Jr., newscaster, 1942
- Weldon Stomps - newscaster, 1942.
- Berry Bell, 1972-1975
- John Williams, 1973-1976
- Roger Harris, 1978–present
- Rick Cody, 1978-1992
- J.Robert Beck, 1981-1983
- Craig Miller, 1983-1986
- Jeff Tyler, 1983-1988
- Mike Hall, 1968–present

== General Managers ==
- Jerry Spencer
- Bill Huddleston - 1978-1984
- Roger Harris - 1984 to present
