= Nishinoshō Station =

Railway station in Wakayama, Wakayama Prefecture, Japan

Nishinoshō Station 西ノ庄駅
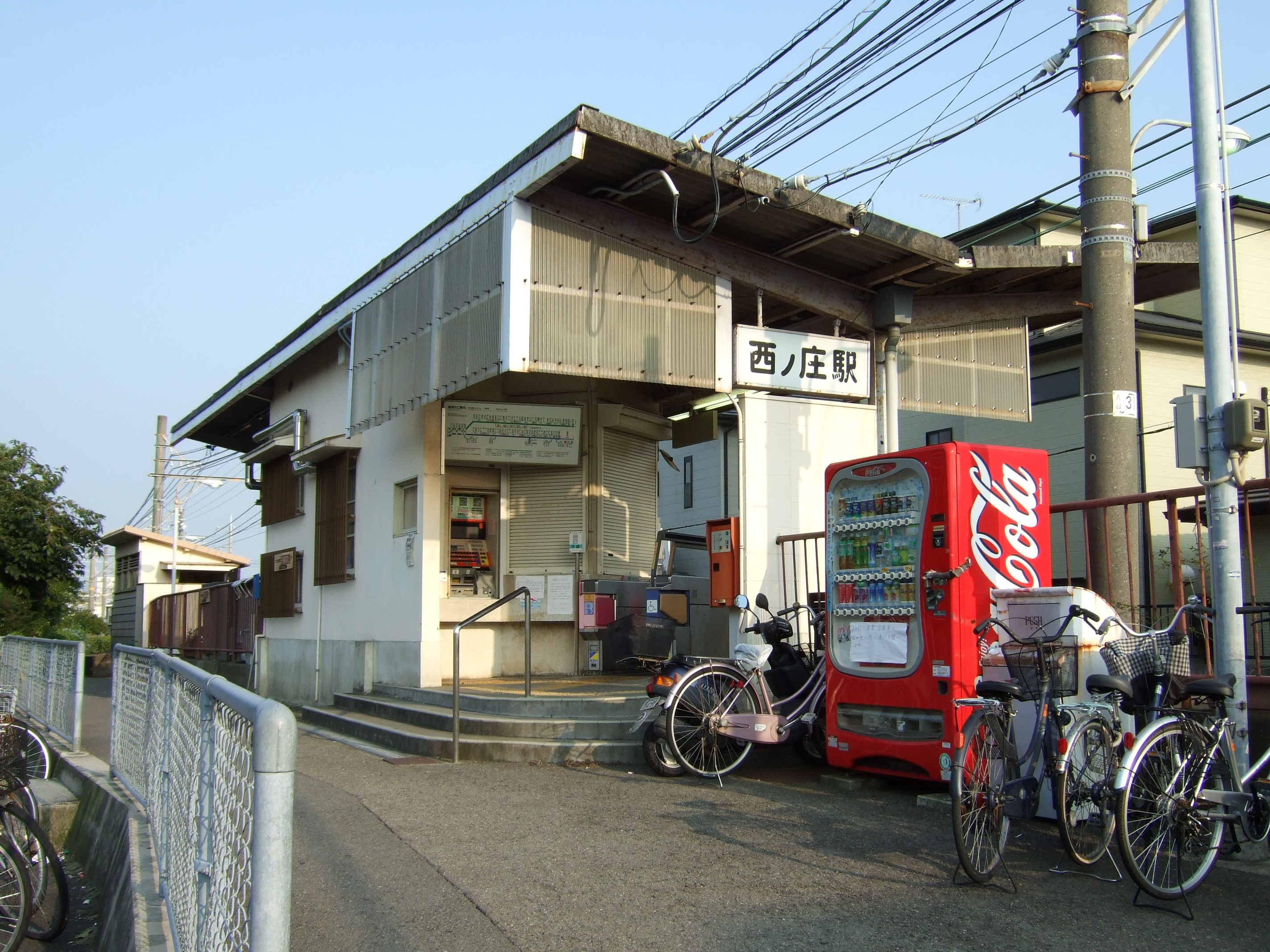
- Nishinoshō Station building in August 2009

General information
- Location: 1016-3, Nishinoshō, Wakayama-shi, Wakayama-ken 640-0112; Japan
- Coordinates: 34°15′20.18″N 135°6′37.85″E
- Operator: Nankai Electric Railway
- Line: Kada Line
- Platforms: 1 side platform

Construction
- Structure type: At-grade

Other information
- Station code: NK44-4
- Website: Official website

History
- Opened: December 1, 1930

Passengers
- FY2019: 660 daily

Services
Preceding station	Nankai Electric Railway	Following station
Nirigahama towards Kada	Kada Line	Hachimanmae towards Wakayamashi
Location
- Location within Wakayama Prefecture Location within Japan

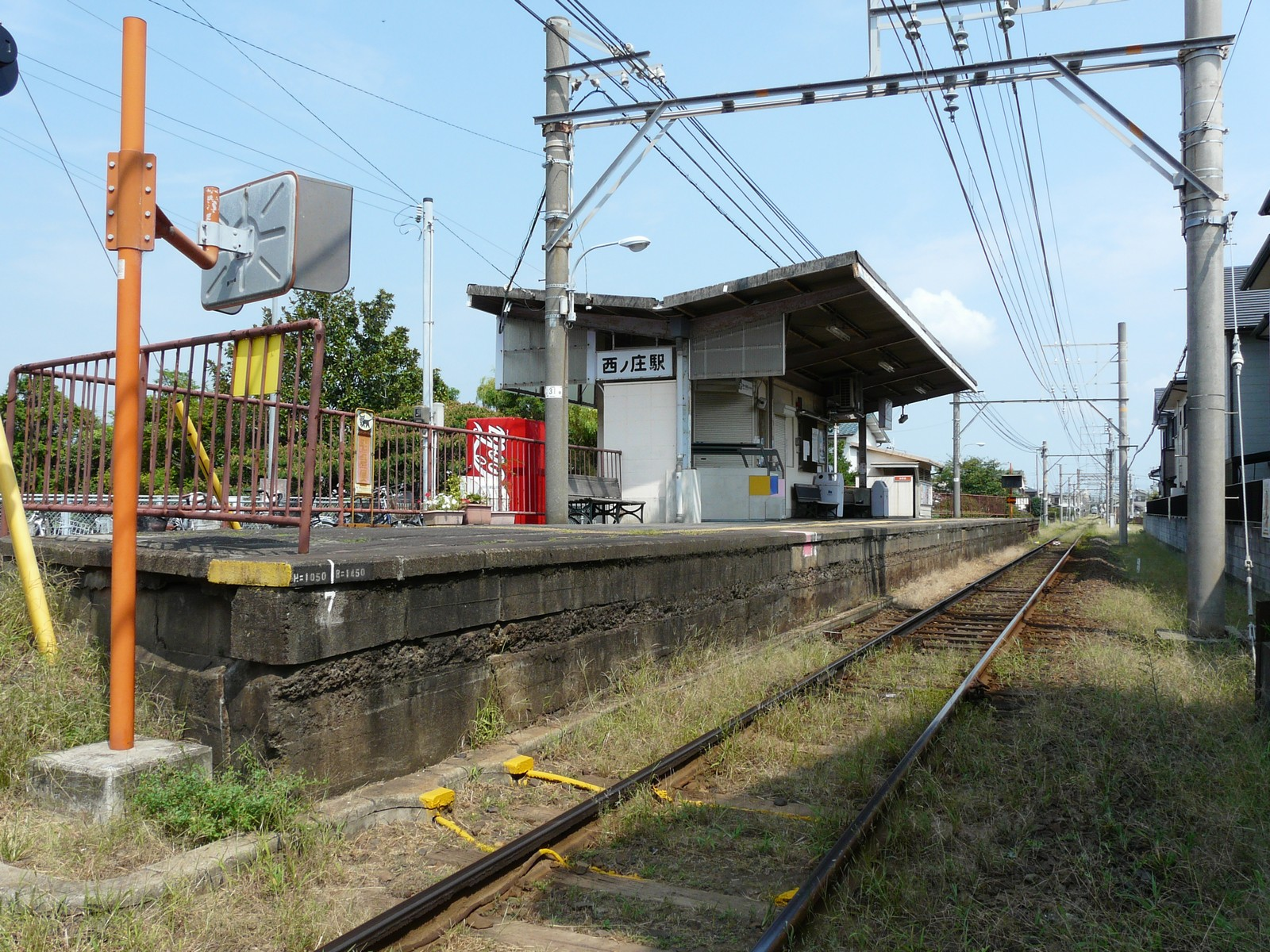
Platform

Nishinoshō Station (西ノ庄駅, Nishinoshō-eki) is a passenger railway station located in the city of Wakayama, Wakayama Prefecture, Japan, operated by the private railway company Nankai Electric Railway.

== Lines ==
Nishinoshō Station is served by the Kada Line, and has the station number "NK44-4"., It is located 5.5 kilometers from the terminus of the line at Kinokawa Station and 8.1 kilometers from Wakayamashi Station.

== Station layout ==
The station consists of one side platform. The station is unattended.

== History ==
Nishinoshō Station opened on December 1, 1930.

== Passenger statistics ==
In fiscal 2019, the station was used by an average of 660 passengers daily (boarding passengers only).

== Surrounding Area ==
- Wakayama Nishinosho Naka Post Office
- Kasei Park
- Nippon Steel & Sumitomo Metal Single Dormitory

== See also ==
- List of railway stations in Japan
