= Hachimanmae Station (Wakayama) =

Railway station in Wakayama, Wakayama Prefecture, Japan

Hachimanmae Station 八幡前駅
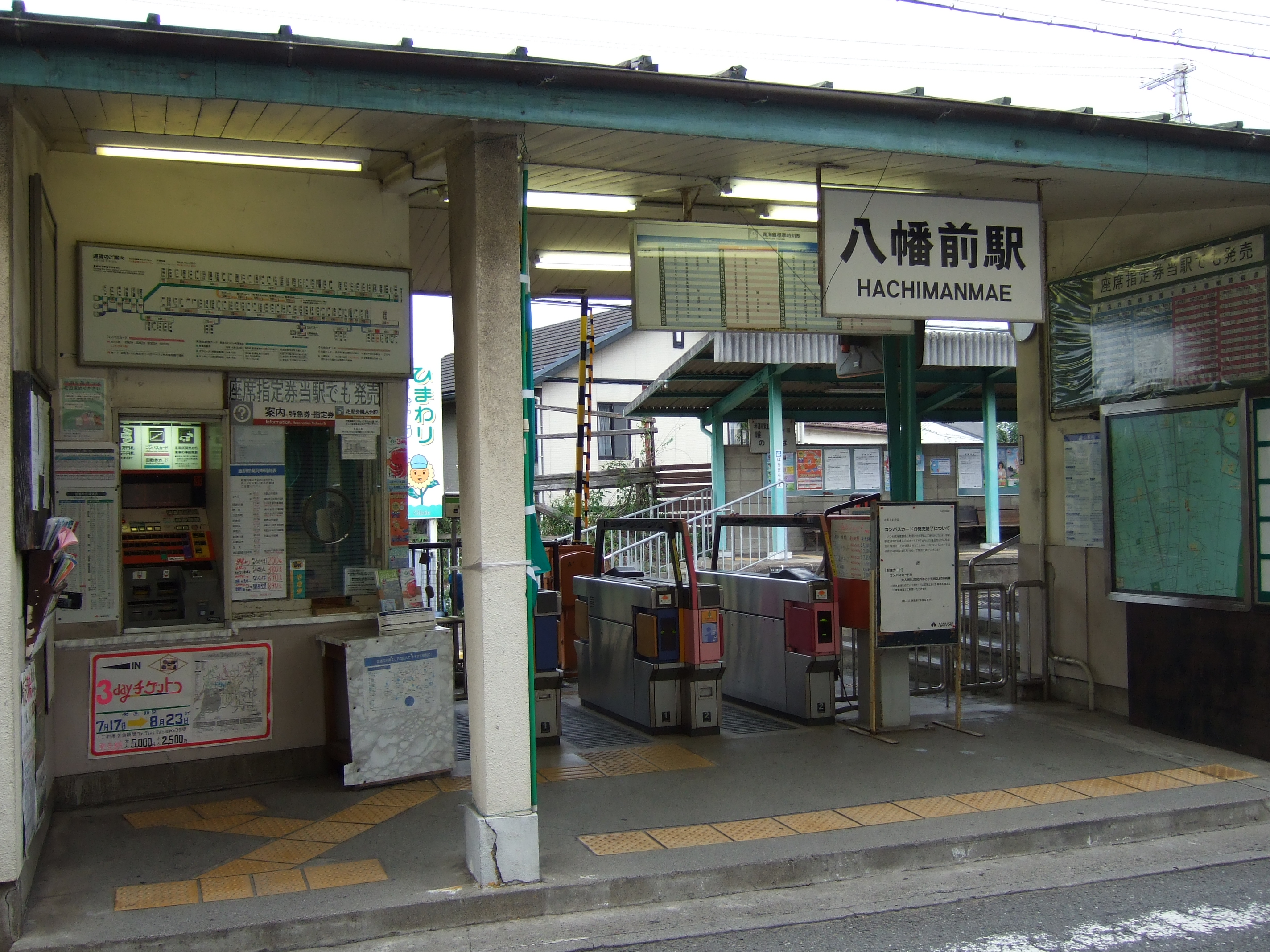
- Hachimanmae Station in August 2009

General information
- Location: 222-2, Koya, Wakayama-shi, Wakayama-ken 640-8435 （和歌山県和歌山市古屋222番地2） Japan
- Coordinates: 34°15′9.57″N 135°7′17.68″E
- Operator: Nankai Electric Railway
- Line: Kada Line
- Platforms: 2 side platforms

Construction
- Accessible: Yes

Other information
- Station code: NK44-3
- Website: Official website

History
- Opened: June 16, 1912

Passengers
- FY2019: 1483 daily

Services
| Preceding station | Nankai Electric Railway | Following station |
|---|---|---|
| Nishinoshō towards Kada | Kada Line | Nakamatsue towards Wakayamashi |
Location
- Location within Wakayama Prefecture Location within Japan

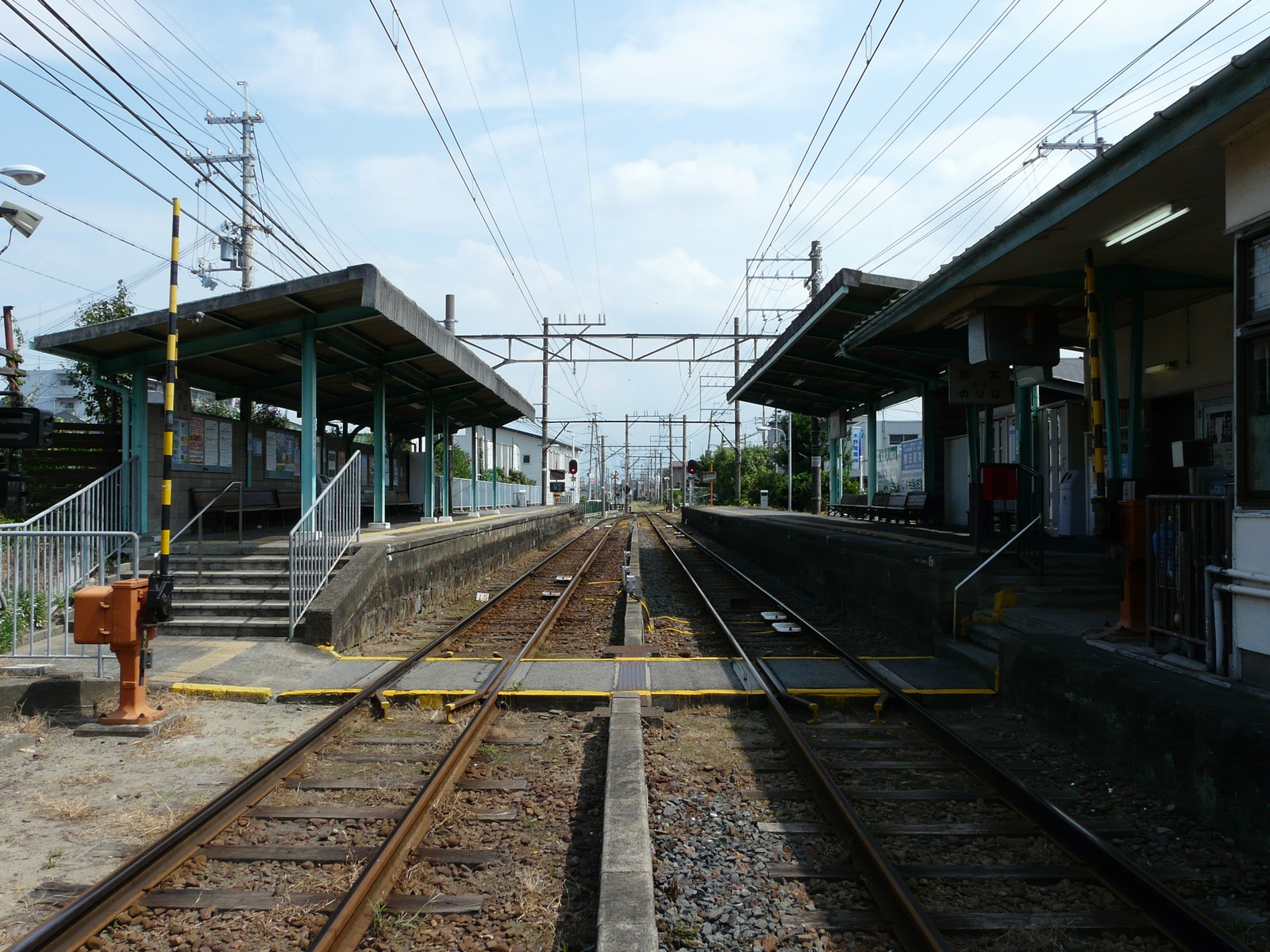
Platforms

Hachimanmae Station (八幡前駅, Hachimanmae-eki) is a passenger railway station located in the city of Wakayama, Wakayama Prefecture, Japan, operated by the private railway company Nankai Electric Railway.

== Lines ==
Hachimanmae Station is served by the Kada Line, and has the station number "NK44-3"., It is located 4.4 kilometers from the terminus of the line at Kinokawa Station and 7.0 kilometers from Wakayamashi Station.

== Station layout ==
The station consists of two opposed side platforms connected by a level crossing.

=== Platforms ===
| 1 | ■ Nankai Kada Line | for Kada |
| 2 | ■ Nankai Kada Line | for Wakayamashi |

== History ==
Nirigahama Station opened on June 16, 1912.

== Passenger statistics ==
In fiscal 2019, the station was used by an average of 1483 passengers daily (boarding passengers only).

== Surrounding Area ==
- Kimoto Hachiman-gu

== See also ==
- List of railway stations in Japan
