= Nakamatsue Station =

Railway station in Wakayama, Wakayama Prefecture, Japan

Nakamatsue Station 中松江駅
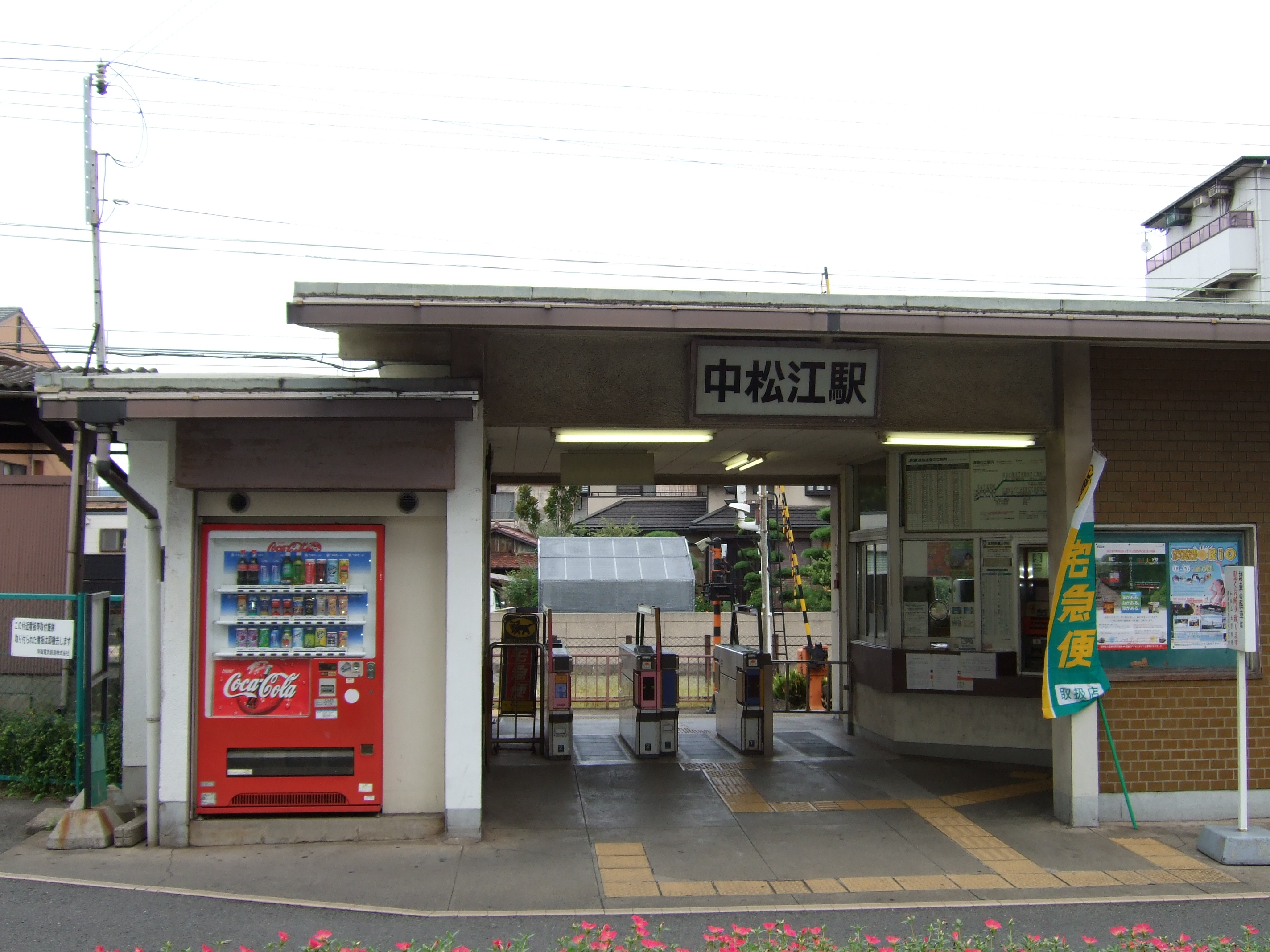
- Nakamatsue Station building in August 2009

General information
- Location: 3-3-1 Matsuenaka, Wakayama-shi, Wakayama-ken 640-8423; Japan
- Coordinates: 34°14′55″N 135°08′00″E
- Operator: Nankai Electric Railway
- Line: Kada Line
- Distance: 3.3 km from Kinokawa
- Platforms: 1 side platform
- Tracks: 1

Construction
- Structure type: At-grade
- Accessible: Yes

Other information
- Station code: NK44-2
- Website: Official website

History
- Opened: 16 June 1912

Passengers
- FY2019: 883 daily

Services
Preceding station	Nankai Electric Railway	Following station
Hachimanmae towards Kada	Kada Line	Higashi-Matsue towards Wakayamashi
Location
- Location within Wakayama Prefecture Location within Japan

Nakamatsue Station (中松江駅, Nakamatsue-eki) is a passenger railway station located in the city of Wakayama, Wakayama Prefecture, Japan, operated by the private railway company Nankai Electric Railway.

== Lines ==
Nakamatsue Station is served by the Kada Line, and has the station number "NK44-3". It is located 3.3 kilometers from the terminus of the line at Kinokawa Station and 5.9 kilometers from Wakayamashi Station.

== Station layout ==
The station consists of two opposed side platforms connected by a level crossing.

=== Platforms ===
1	■ Nankai Kada Line	for Kada
2	■ Nankai Kada Line	for Wakayamashi

== History ==
Nakamatsue Station opened on June 16, 1912.

== Passenger statistics ==
In fiscal 2019, the station was used by an average of 883 passengers daily (boarding passengers only).

== Surrounding area ==
- Wakayama Municipal Kasai Junior High School
- Wakayama Municipal Matsue Elementary School

== See also ==
- List of railway stations in Japan
