= Nirigahama Station =

Railway station in Wakayama, Wakayama Prefecture, Japan

Nirigahama Station 二里ヶ浜駅
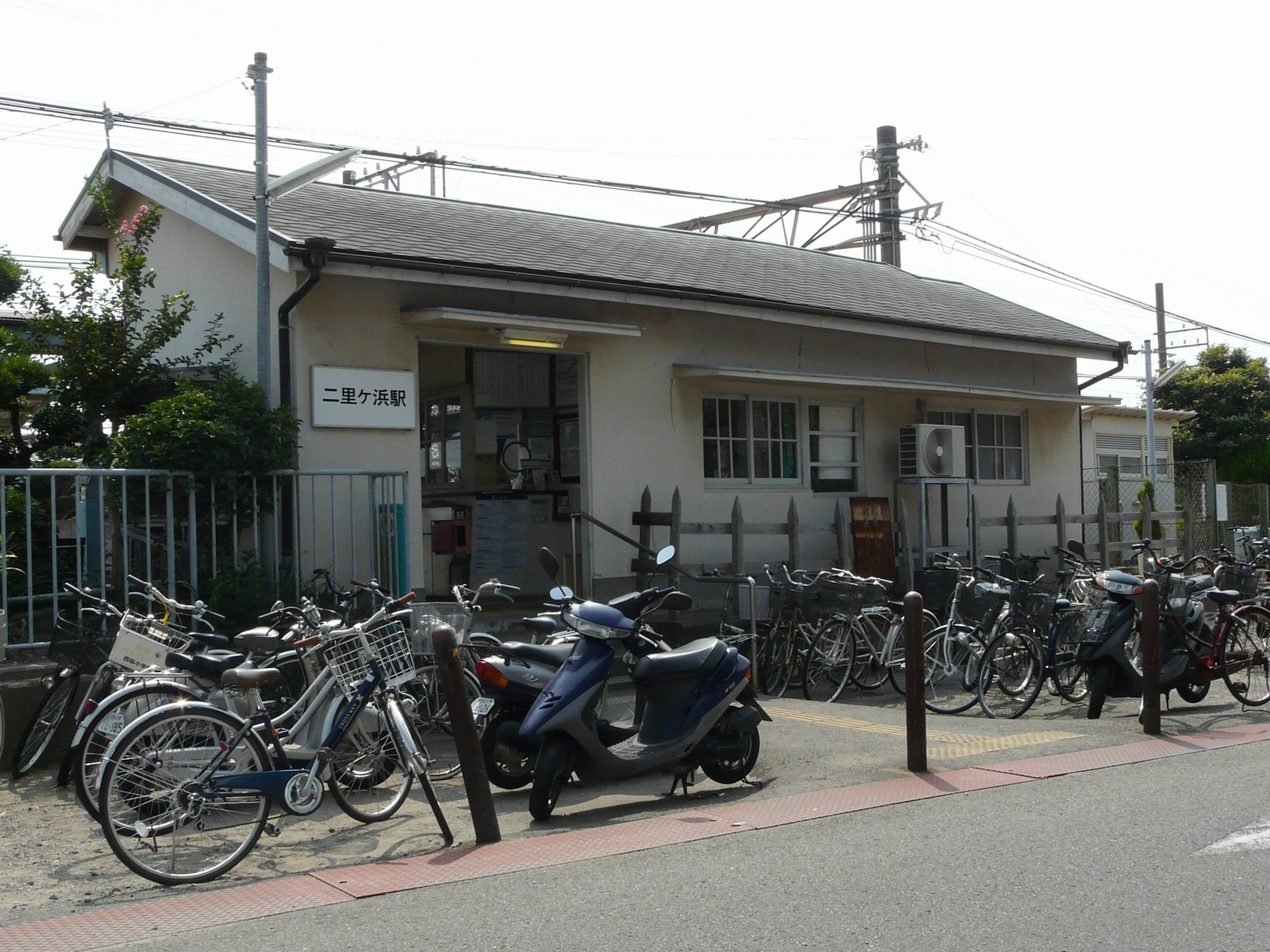
- Nirigahama Station, July 2008

General information
- Location: 1017-3, Nishinoshō, Wakayama-shi, Wakayama-ken 640-0112; Japan
- Coordinates: 34°15′27.79″N 135°6′14.52″E
- Operator: Nankai Electric Railway
- Line: Kada Line
- Distance: 6.2 km from Kinokawa
- Platforms: 2 side platforms

Construction
- Structure type: At-grade

Other information
- Station code: NK44-5
- Website: Official website

History
- Opened: June 16, 1912

Passengers
- FY2019: 396 daily

Services
Preceding station	Nankai Electric Railway	Following station
Isonoura towards Kada	Kada Line	Nishinoshō towards Wakayamashi
Location
- Location within Wakayama Prefecture Location within Japan

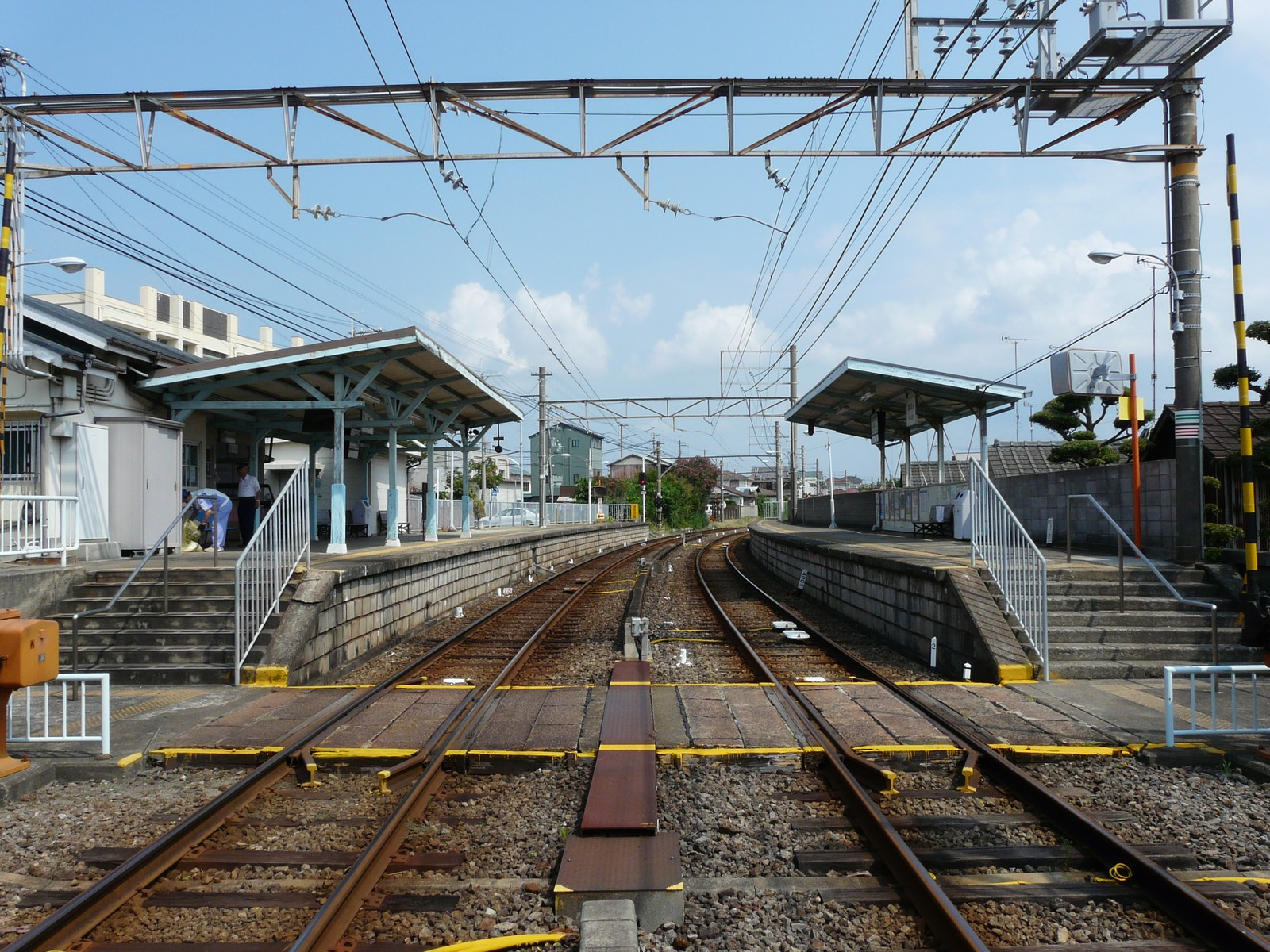
Platforms

Nirigahama Station (二里ヶ浜駅, Nirigahama-eki) is a passenger railway station located in the city of Wakayama, Wakayama Prefecture, Japan, operated by the private railway company Nankai Electric Railway.

== Lines ==
Nirigahama Station is served by the Kada Line, and has the station number "NK44-5"., It is located 6.2 kilometers from the terminus of the line at Kinokawa Station and 8.9 kilometers from Wakayamashi Station.

== Station layout ==
The station consists of two opposed side platforms connected by a level crossing.

=== Platforms ===
1	■ Nankai Kada Line	for Kada
2	■ Nankai Kada Line	for Wakayamashi

== History ==
Nirigahama Station opened on June 16, 1912.

== Passenger statistics ==
In fiscal 2019, the station was used by an average of 396 passengers daily (boarding passengers only).

== Surrounding Area ==
- Nishiwaki Elementary School

== See also ==
- List of railway stations in Japan
