= Isonoura Station =

Railway station in Wakayama, Wakayama Prefecture, Japan

Isonoura Station 磯ノ浦駅
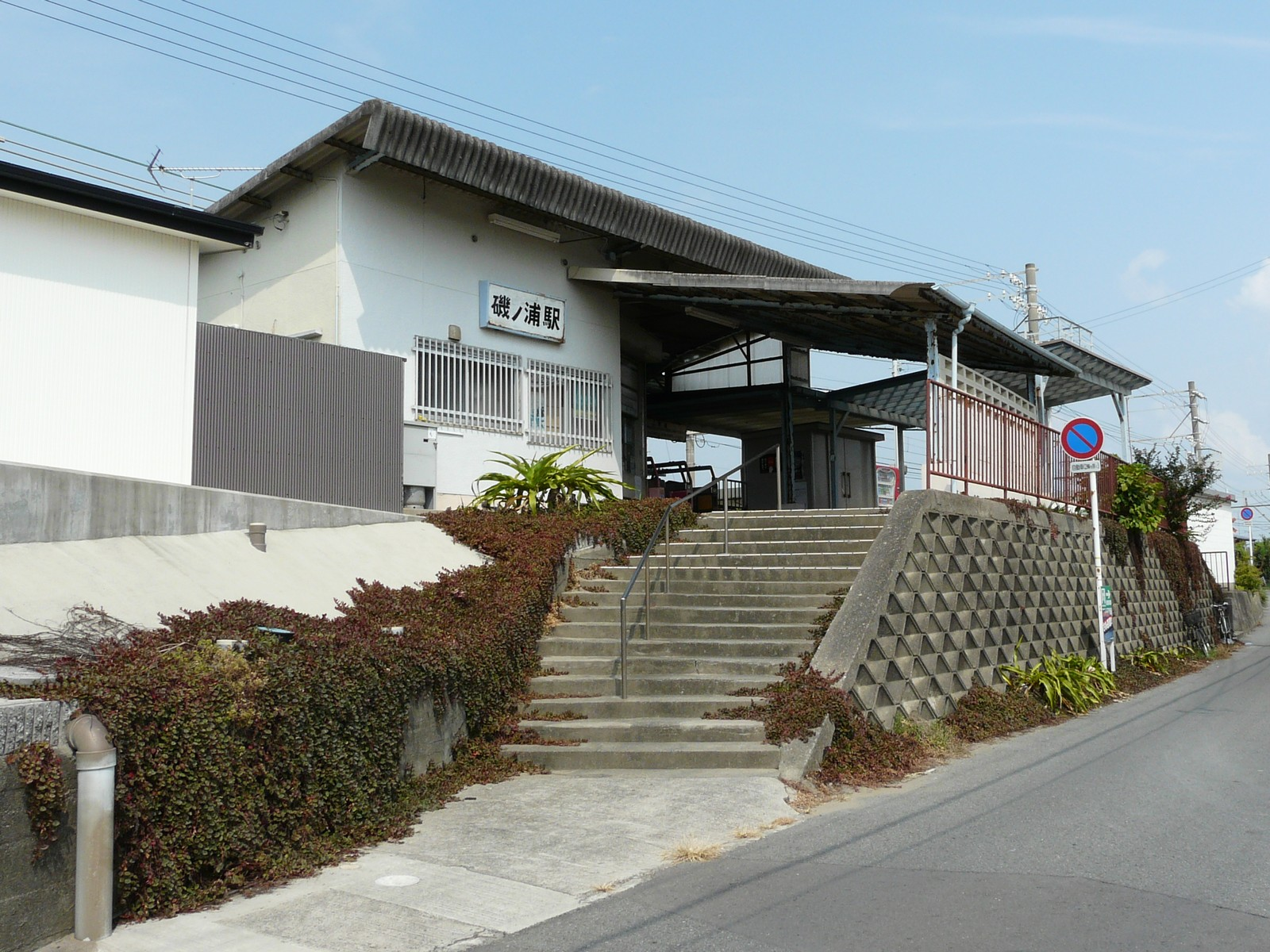
- Isonoura Station, July 2008

General information
- Location: 377-2, Isonoura, Wakayama-shi, Wakayama-ken 640-0114; Japan
- Coordinates: 34°15′38″N 135°05′41″E
- Operator: Nankai Electric Railway
- Line: Kada Line
- Platforms: 2 side platforms

Construction
- Structure type: At-grade

Other information
- Station code: NK44-6
- Website: Official website

History
- Opened: June 16, 1912

Passengers
- FY2019: 107 daily

Services
Preceding station	Nankai Electric Railway	Following station
Kada Terminus	Kada Line	Nirigahama towards Wakayamashi
Location
- Location within Wakayama Prefecture Location within Japan

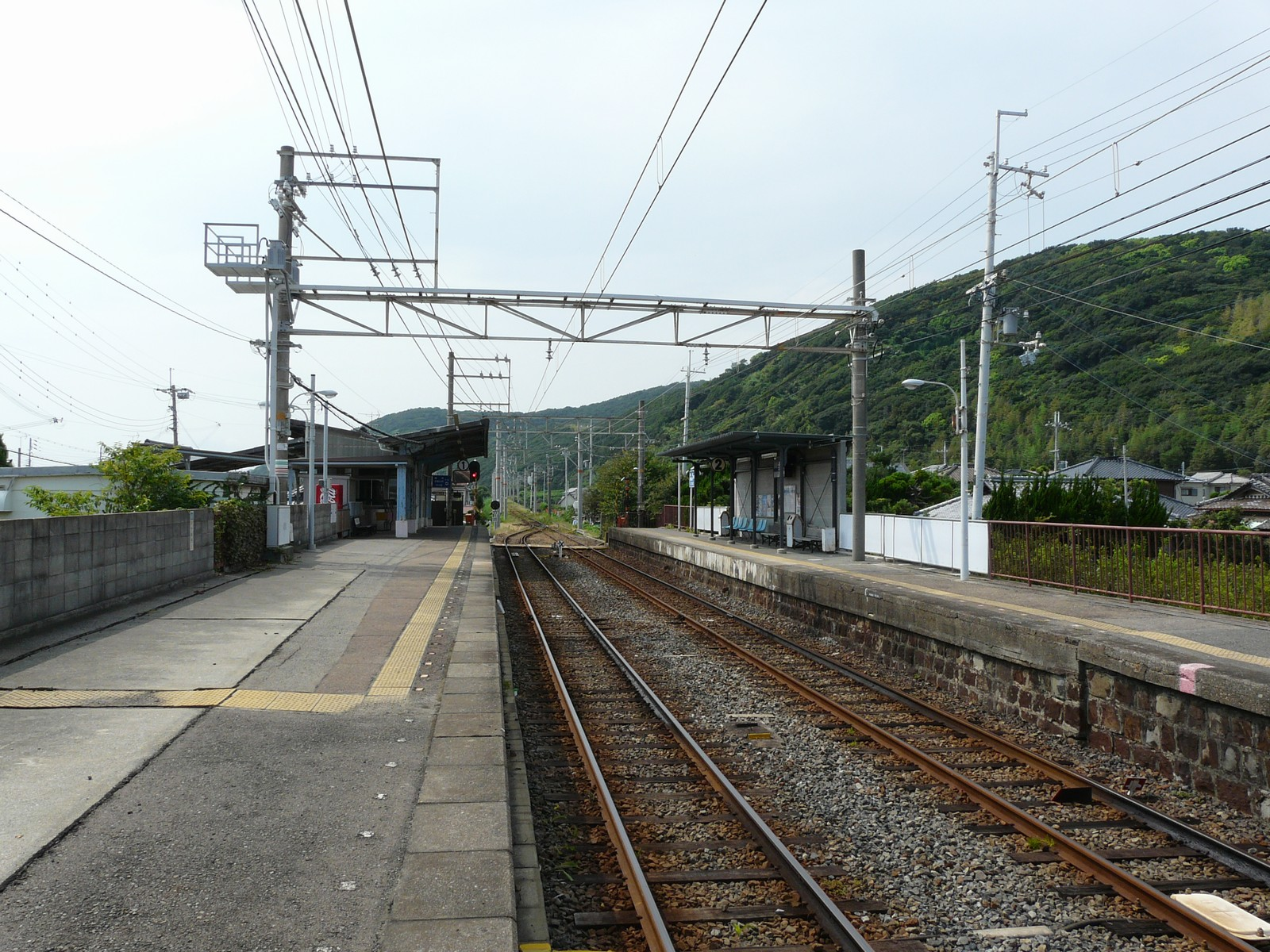
Platforms

Isonoura Station (磯ノ浦駅, Isonoura-eki) is a passenger railway station located in the city of Wakayama, Wakayama Prefecture, Japan, operated by the private railway company Nankai Electric Railway.

== Lines ==
Isonoura Station is served by the Kada Line, and has the station number "NK44-6"., It is located 7.1 kilometers from the terminus of the line at Kinokawa Station and 9.7 kilometers from Wakayamashi Station.

== Station layout ==
The station consists of two opposed side platforms connected by a level crossing.

=== Platforms ===
1	■ Nankai Kada Line	for Kada
2	■ Nankai Kada Line	for Wakayamashilinecol=#009a41

== History ==
Isonoura Station opened on June 16, 1912.

== Passenger statistics ==
In fiscal 2019, the station was used by an average of 107 passengers daily (boarding passengers only).

== Surrounding Area ==
- Isonoura beach

== See also ==
- List of railway stations in Japan
