= Higashi-Matsue Station (Wakayama) =

Railway station in Wakayama, Wakayama Prefecture, Japan

Higashi-Matsue Station 東松江駅
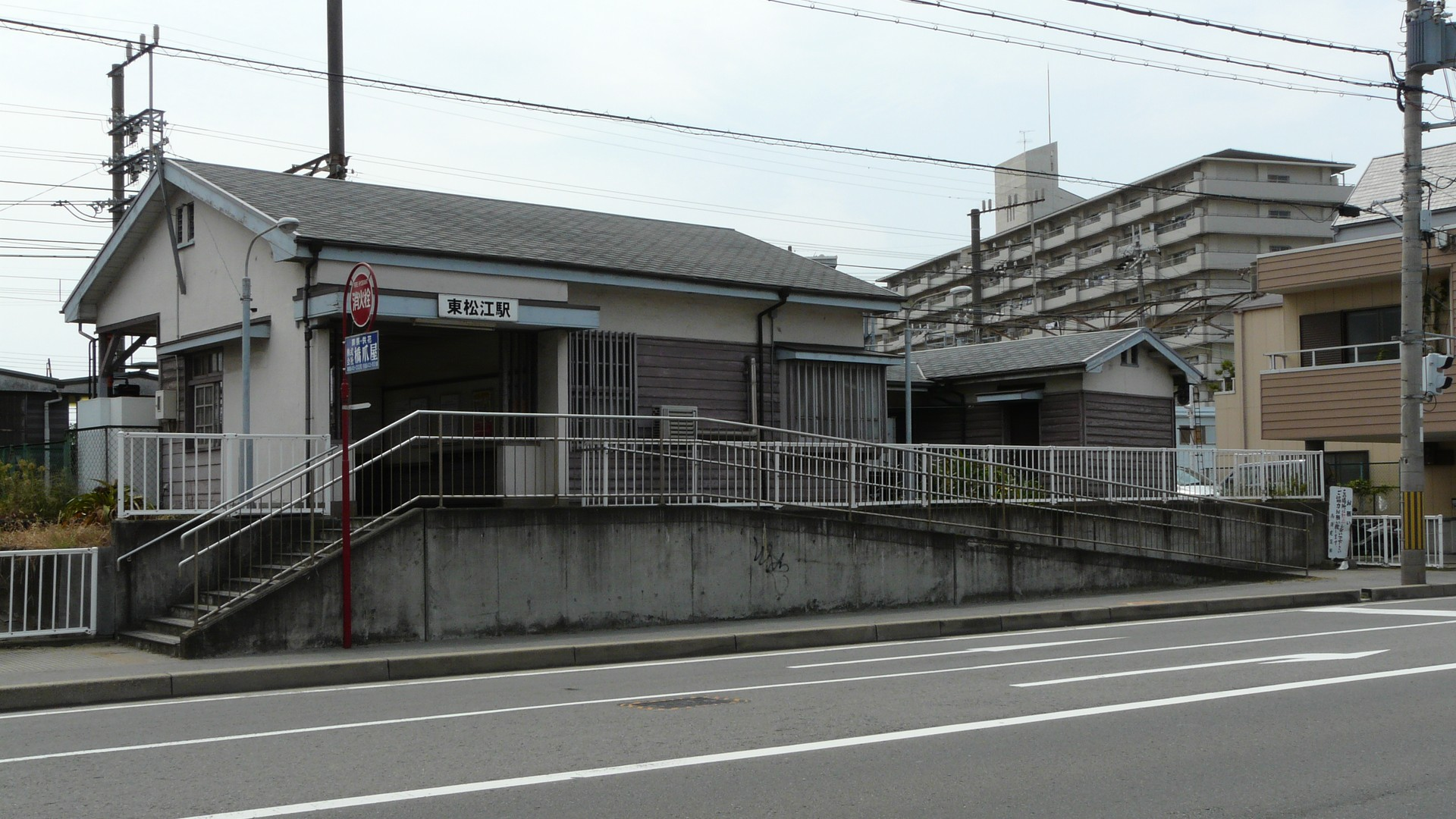
- Higashi-Matsue Station, July 2008

General information
- Location: 14-1, Matsuehigashi 4-chōme, Wakayama-shi, Wakayama-ken 640-8422; Japan
- Coordinates: 34°14′52.5″N 135°8′26.3″E
- Operator: Nankai Electric Railway
- Line: Kada Line
- Platforms: 1 island platform
- Connections: Bus stop

Construction
- Structure type: At-grade
- Accessible: Yes

Other information
- Station code: NK44-1
- Website: Official website

History
- Opened: December 1, 1930

Passengers
- 2019: 947 daily

Services
Preceding station	Nankai Electric Railway	Following station
Nakamatsue towards Kada	Kada Line	Kinokawa towards Wakayamashi
Location
- Location within Wakayama Prefecture Location within Japan

Higashi-Matsue Station (東松江駅, Higashi-Matsue-eki) is a passenger railway station located in the city of Wakayama, Wakayama Prefecture, Japan, operated by the private railway operator Nankai Electric Railway.

== Lines ==
Higashi-Matsue Station is served by the Kada Line, and has the station number "NK44-1". It is located 2.6 kilometers from the terminus of the line at Kinokawa Station and 5.2 kilometers from Wakayamashi Station.

== Station layout ==
The station consists of one island platform connected to the station building by a level crossing.

=== Platforms ===
1	■ Nankai Kada Line	for Kada
2	■ Nankai Kada Line	for Wakayamashi

== History ==
Higashi-Matsue Station opened on December 1, 1930.

== Passenger statistics ==
In fiscal 2019, the station was used by an average of 947 passengers daily (boarding passengers only).

== Surrounding Area ==
- Nippon Steel & Sumitomo Metal Wakayama Steel Works.

== See also ==
- List of railway stations in Japan
