= KWPV =

Chickasaw Nation radio station in Wynnewood, Oklahoma

Repeater of KCNP Ada
- Wynnewood, Oklahoma; United States
- Frequency: 104.5 MHz
- Branding: KCNP, Chickasaw Community Radio Network

Programming
- Format: Community radio

Ownership
- Owner: The Chickasaw Nation
- Sister stations: KCNP, KAZC

History
- First air date: 2014
- Former call signs: KVOY (2014–2020)
- Call sign meaning: Wynnewood/Pauls Valley

Technical information
- Licensing authority: FCC
- Facility ID: 185094
- Class: A
- ERP: 5,500 watts
- HAAT: 62 meters (203 ft)
- Transmitter coordinates: 34°40′6.20″N 97°17′48″W

Links
- Public license information: Public file; LMS
- Webcast: https://listen.streamon.fm/kcnp
- Website: kcnp.org

KWPV (104.5 FM) is a radio station licensed to Wynnewood, Oklahoma, United States. The station is currently owned by the Chickasaw Nation.

== History ==
This station was assigned call sign KVOY on February 13, 2014. The station, originally owned by Real Community Radio, was sold to the Chickasaw Nation, owner of KCNP in Ada and its two dependent repeaters, for $14,000 in 2020. The sale was consummated on May 25, 2020.
