= KLIS =

KLIS may refer to:

- KLIS (AM), a radio station (590 AM) formerly licensed to Wood River, Illinois, United States, which held the call sign from 2025 to 2026
- KXFC, a radio station (105.9 FM) licensed to Coalgate, Oklahoma, United States, which held the call sign KLIS from May to August 2001
- KOYE, a radio station (96.7 FM) licensed to Frankton, Texas, United States, which held the call sign KLIS from 1970 to 2001
