= Wakayama College of Science Studies =

- 和歌山県立理科短期大学
- Type: Public
- Active: 1950–1955
- Location: Wakayama, Wakayama Prefecture, Japan

Wakayama College of Science Studies (和歌山県立理科短期大学, Wakayama Kenritsu Rika Tankidaigaku) was a public junior college in Wakayama, Wakayama, Japan.

== History ==
It was set up in 1950, and closed in 1955.

== See also ==
- Wakayama Medical University
