= Higashi-Matsue Station =

Higashi-Matsue Station (東松江駅) is the name of two train stations in Japan:

1. Higashi-Matsue Station (Shimane)
2. Higashi-Matsue Station (Wakayama)
