= Kinokawa (disambiguation) =

Kinokawa is a city in Japan.

Kinokawa may also refer to:

- Kinokawa River, a river in Japan
- Kinokawa Station, a railway station
