= Lillard Hill =

American broadcast journalist (1922–2009)

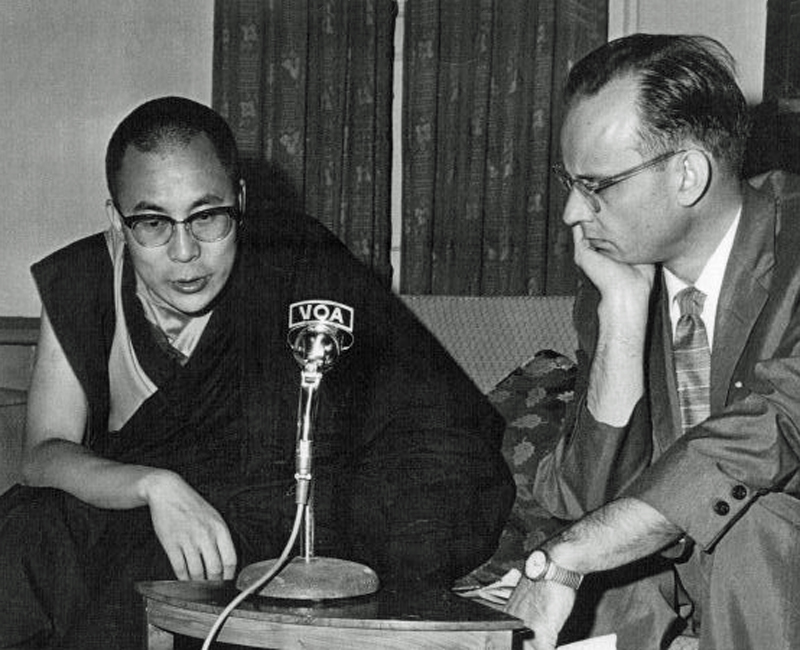
- 14th Dalai Lama with Hill in 1959
- Born: Lillard Lee Hill Jr. July 29, 1922; Ada, Oklahoma, U.S.
- Died: December 8, 2009 (aged 87); Fort Worth, Texas, U.S.
- Education: East Central State College Northwestern University, Texas Christian University
- Occupations: Television and radio broadcaster; news anchor
- Years active: 1940s–1980s
- Spouse: Betty Sue Stringer (m. 1946; died 2005)
- Children: 4

Lillard Lee Hill Jr. (July 29, 1922 – December 8, 2009) was an American broadcast journalist, diplomat, and statesman who worked in radio and television in Oklahoma and Texas and served as a foreign correspondent for Voice of America and worked for the United States Information Agency and the US State Department.

Hill reported on and interviewed notable international figures including India's first prime minister Jawaharlal Nehru. Hill was the first journalist to interview the 14th Dalai Lama after his escape from Tibet.

== Early life, education, and marriage ==
Hill was born on July 29, 1922, in Ada, Oklahoma to Lillard Lee Hill Sr., a building contractor, and Elizabeth Sue Owen Hill, a schoolteacher. As a boy, Hill contracted polio at age 8 and first used a cane and later a wheelchair to assist with his mobility.

Hill attended Horace Mann High School at East Central State College in Ada, Oklahoma, where he participated in marching band along with his brother James Douglas Hill and sister Virginia Sue Hill. Lillard Hill graduated from Horace Mann High School in 1940.

Hill attended East Central State College where he excelled in debate, winning first place in radio and poetry competitions in 1943.

Hill attended Texas Christian University where he met Betty Sue Stringer. They married in 1946.

== Broadcasting career ==
Hill began his broadcasting career at KADA (AM), a radio station in Ada, Oklahoma serving as chief announcer and program director in the early 1940s.

While working at KADA in 1943, Hill was one of only one hundred people chosen from one thousand applicants to attend a summer session at Northwestern University for special training in radio broadcasting. KADA gave Hill a leave of absence to attend this training.

In 1943, WBAP (AM), a radio station in Fort Worth, Texas founded and owned by Amon G. Carter, founding publisher of the Fort Worth Star-Telegram, hired Hill who joined the on-air staff broadcasting news from a downtown Fort Worth hotel.

In the summer of 1948, Hill was chosen to join the staff at the newly created WBAP-TV, also owned by Carter, the first television station in the state of Texas.

When WBAP-TV went on the air in the fall of 1948, Hill became the first Texas television news anchor. On the evening of WBAP-TV's first public broadcast, September 29, 1948, at around 8pm Hill sat at a table wearing a newly-purchased blue shirt. Light blue was the chosen color after rehearsals revealed white shirts appeared gray but light blue appeared white on the black and white broadcast. Hill delivered the first local newscast by reading from a script for five minutes while the camera remained focused on him. Following Hill's newscast, a movie played. Then Hill returned to the screen for the first broadcast of "The Texas News", a WBAP-TV produced newsreel that would become a popular nightly feature with Hill as the original voice.

Hill was chosen for his prominent role due in part to his "great speaking voice".

Hill was a pioneer in creating remote television interviews and feature stories at a time when recording equipment was bulky and difficult to transport. His content would appear on WBAP-TV as popular newsreel broadcasts.

In a 1953 study of adult radio and television listening habits in Texas, Hill was among the highest ranked local newscasters.

Hill appeared in the first color television broadcast in Texas. On Saturday, May 15, 1954, WBAP-TV assembled over three hundred local civic leaders, advertising managers, and out-of-town media executives including NBC president Pat Weaver, NBC executive vice-president Robert W. Sarnoff, and NBC vice-president Harry Bannister, for an event called "Color Day" to unveil color television in Texas. This first color broadcast extended over three hours and included familiar WBAP-TV personalities, singers, dancers, a twelve-piece orchestra, and newsman Lillard Hill.

== Voice of America ==
In 1954, Hill moved to Washington DC with his family to become a correspondent with Voice of America. He and his family would later spend time stationed with Voice of America living in New Delhi, India, where Hill served as India bureau chief, Burma, Nigeria, Vietnam, and Malawi.

While stationed in Burma, Hill led the in-country Voice of America team as Director of the Burma Desk during the time Burmese diplomat U Thant served as United Nations secretary general. Hill also served for two years as World Wide English Editor for Voice of America.

== Other activities ==
Hill and his wife were among the founders of the first Unitarian Church in Fort Worth, Texas.

== Retirement ==
Hill retired from the U.S. Foreign Service with the rank of ambassador.

== Death ==
Hill died at his Fort Worth, Texas home in 2009, at the age of 87, after suffering from post-polio syndrome.
