= Kada (surname) =

Kada is a surname. Notable people with the surname include:

- Alexis Kada (born 1994), Cameroonian footballer
- Kada no Azumamaro (1669–1736), Japanese poet and philologist
- Tarik Kada (born 1996), Dutch-Moroccan footballer
- Yukiko Kada (born 1950), former governor of Shiga Prefecture, Japan

== See also ==
- Kada (disambiguation)
- Joe Cada (born 1987), American poker player
- Kaja (name)
