= KAZC =

Chickasaw Nation radio station in Dickson, Oklahoma

- Dickson, Oklahoma; United States
- Frequency: 89.3 MHz

Programming
- Format: Community radio

Ownership
- Owner: The Chickasaw Nation
- Sister stations: KCNP

Technical information
- Licensing authority: FCC
- Facility ID: 177138
- Class: A
- ERP: 3,400 watts
- HAAT: 64.0 meters (210.0 ft)
- Transmitter coordinates: 34°10′26″N 97°11′33″W

Links
- Public license information: Public file; LMS
- Webcast: https://listen.streamon.fm/kcnp

KAZC (89.3 FM) is a radio station licensed to Dickson, Oklahoma, United States. The station is currently owned by The Chickasaw Nation.

== History ==
This station was assigned call sign KAZC on February 6, 2009.
