= KCNP =

Chickasaw Nation radio station in Ada, Oklahoma

Ada, Oklahoma; United States
- Frequency: 89.5 MHz

Programming
- Format: Community radio

Ownership
- Owner: The Chickasaw Nation

History
- First air date: 2009
- Former call signs: KTGS (1998–2008)
- Call sign meaning: Chickasaw Nation Productions

Technical information
- Licensing authority: FCC
- Facility ID: 88713
- Class: C3
- ERP: 5,800 watts
- HAAT: 177.0 meters (580.7 ft)
- Transmitter coordinates: 34°41′1″N 96°45′44″W
- Repeaters: KAZC 89.3 MHz (Dickson); KTNG 97.3 MHz (Connerville); KWPV 104.5 MHz (Wynnewood)

Links
- Public license information: Public file; LMS
- Webcast: https://listen.streamon.fm/kcnp
- Website: Official website

KCNP (89.5 FM) is a radio station licensed to Ada, Oklahoma, United States. The station is currently owned by the Chickasaw Nation.

The Chickasaw Nation owns three additional transmitters that simulcast KCNP – KAZC 89.3 in Dickson, KTNG 97.3 in Connerville, and KWPV 104.5 in Wynnewood.

== Repeaters ==
Call sign	Frequency	City of license	State	Power W	ERP W	Height m (ft)	Class	FCC info
KAZC	89.3 FM	Dickson	Oklahoma		3,400	64 m (210 ft)	A	FCC (KAZC)
KTNG	97.3 FM	Connerville	Oklahoma		6,000	96 m (315 ft)	A	FCC (KTNG)
KWPV	104.5 FM	Wynnewood	Oklahoma		5,500	62 m (203 ft)	A	FCC (KWPV)

== History ==
The station was assigned the call letters KTGS on August 14, 1998. On September 24, 2008, the station changed its call sign to the current KCNP.

The Gospel Station own this station in December 1998 it was on 89.9 FM.

Established in 2009, Chickasaw Community Radio Network provides news, public affairs, weather coverage and a wide variety of music for citizens in south-central Oklahoma.

Owned and operated as a public service of the Chickasaw Nation, KCNP is a non-commercial community radio station.

A vision of Governor Bill Anoatubby, KCNP Chickasaw Community Radio Network was created to connect citizens through quality programming and news.

== See also ==
- List of community radio stations in the United States
