= Wakayama (city) =

Core city in Honshu, Japan

Wakayama 和歌山市
- Prefecture capital and Core city
- Wakayama City
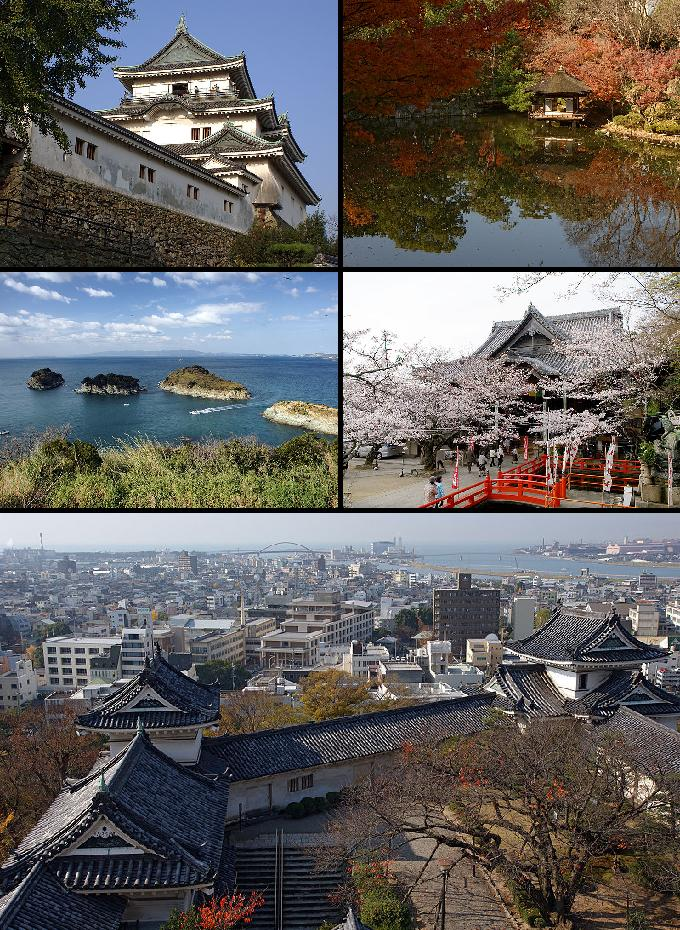
- Wakayama Castle, Nishinomaru Garden, Saikazaki, Kimiidera Temple, Downtown Wakayama viewed from the castle keep

- Flag Seal
- Location of Wakayama in Wakayama Prefecture

- Location within Japan
- Coordinates: 34°14′N 135°10′E
- Country: Japan
- Region: Honshu (Kansai)
- Prefecture: Wakayama
- City settled: April 1, 1889

Government
  - Mayor: Taro Ozaki (尾崎太郎) - from August 2026

Area
  - Total: 208.84 km^{2} (80.63 sq mi)

Population (December 1, 2021)
  - Total: 351,391
  - Density: 1,682.6/km^{2} (4,357.9/sq mi)
- Time zone: UTC+9 (Japan Standard Time)
- Tree: Cinnamomum camphora
- Flower: Azalea
- Address: 23 Shichibancho, Wakayama-shi, Wakayama-ken 640-8511
- Website: Official website

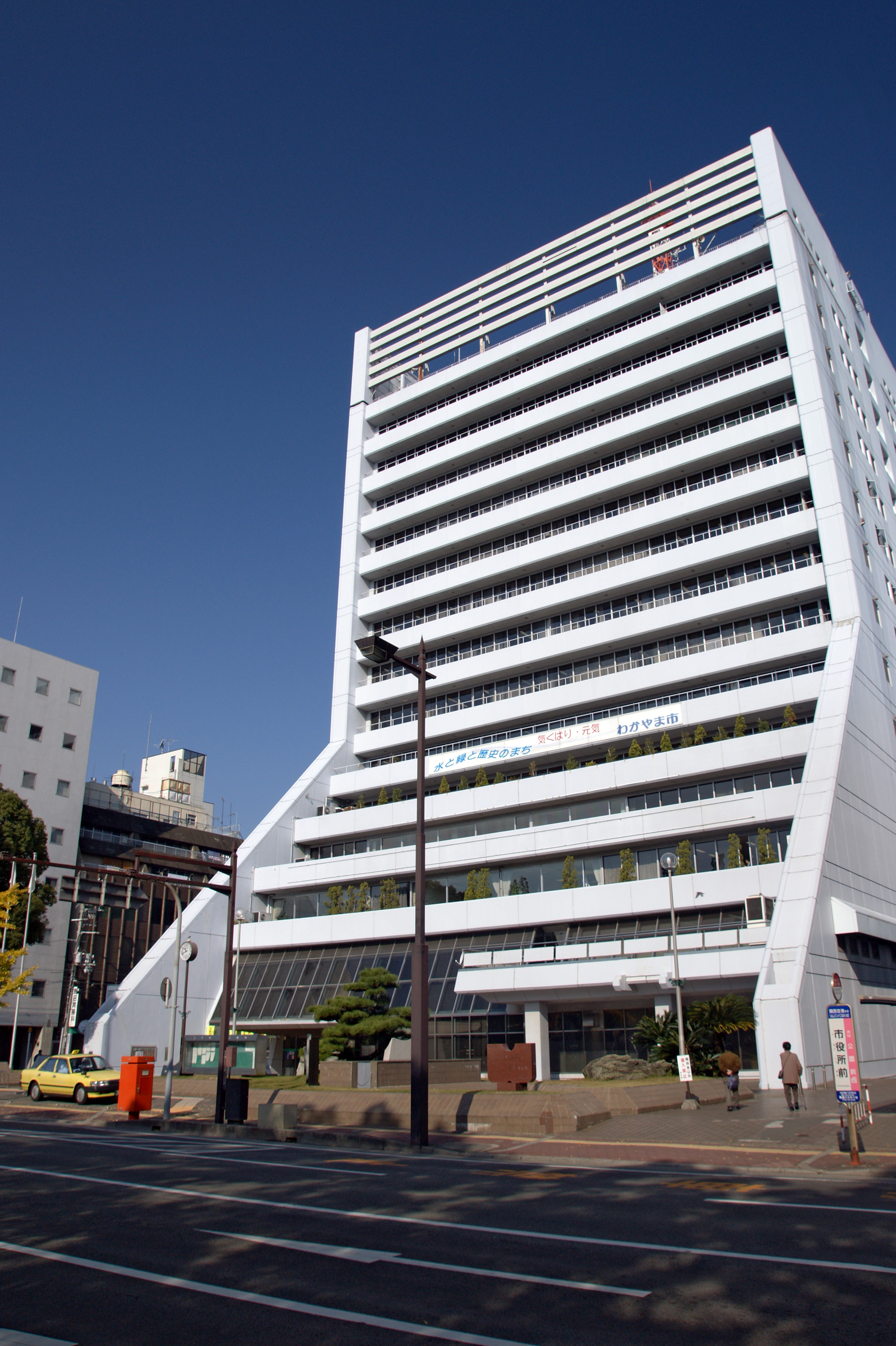
Wakayama City Hall

Wakayama (和歌山市, Wakayama-shi; Japanese pronunciation: [β̞ä̀.kä́.jä̀.mä̀, -jä́.mä́.ɕì]) is the capital city of Wakayama Prefecture in the Kansai region of Japan. As of 1 December 2021, the city had an estimated population of 351,391 in 157,066 households and a population density of 1700 persons per km^{2}. The total area of the city is 208.84 square kilometres (80.63 sq mi).

== Geography ==
Wakayama is located at the northwest corner of Wakayama Prefecture, bordered by Osaka Prefecture to the north and the Kii Channel and Kitan Strait to the west. It is located on the mouth of the Kinokawa River with the main urban center of the city on the river's left bank.

=== Neighboring municipalities ===
Hyōgo Prefecture

- Sumoto, Hyōgo (separated by the Kitan Strait)

Osaka Prefecture

- Hannan
- Misaki

Wakayama Prefecture

- Iwade
- Kainan
- Kinokawa

== Climate ==
Wakayama has a Humid subtropical climate (Köppen Cfa) characterized by warm summers and cool winters with light to no snowfall. The average annual temperature in Wakayama is 15.6 °C. The average annual rainfall is 1713 mm with September as the wettest month. The temperatures are highest on average in August, at around 26.4 °C, and lowest in January, at around 5.4 °C. The area is subject to typhoons in summer.

Climate data for Wakayama (1991−2020 normals, extremes 1879−present)
Month	Jan	Feb	Mar	Apr	May	Jun	Jul	Aug	Sep	Oct	Nov	Dec	Year
Record high °C (°F)	21.2 (70.2)	22.0 (71.6)	24.7 (76.5)	30.0 (86.0)	32.4 (90.3)	35.3 (95.5)	37.9 (100.2)	38.5 (101.3)	35.8 (96.4)	32.3 (90.1)	27.7 (81.9)	25.2 (77.4)	38.5 (101.3)
Mean maximum °C (°F)	15.7 (60.3)	18.0 (64.4)	21.2 (70.2)	25.5 (77.9)	29.1 (84.4)	31.9 (89.4)	35.4 (95.7)	36.1 (97.0)	33.5 (92.3)	28.7 (83.7)	23.6 (74.5)	19.0 (66.2)	36.4 (97.5)
Mean daily maximum °C (°F)	9.8 (49.6)	10.7 (51.3)	14.3 (57.7)	19.7 (67.5)	24.3 (75.7)	27.1 (80.8)	31.1 (88.0)	32.6 (90.7)	29.0 (84.2)	23.4 (74.1)	17.9 (64.2)	12.5 (54.5)	21.0 (69.8)
Daily mean °C (°F)	6.2 (43.2)	6.7 (44.1)	9.9 (49.8)	15.1 (59.2)	19.7 (67.5)	23.2 (73.8)	27.2 (81.0)	28.4 (83.1)	24.9 (76.8)	19.3 (66.7)	13.8 (56.8)	8.6 (47.5)	16.9 (62.4)
Mean daily minimum °C (°F)	2.9 (37.2)	3.1 (37.6)	5.8 (42.4)	10.7 (51.3)	15.6 (60.1)	20.1 (68.2)	24.3 (75.7)	25.1 (77.2)	21.5 (70.7)	15.6 (60.1)	9.9 (49.8)	5.1 (41.2)	13.3 (55.9)
Mean minimum °C (°F)	−1.0 (30.2)	−0.7 (30.7)	0.9 (33.6)	4.1 (39.4)	10.4 (50.7)	15.8 (60.4)	20.7 (69.3)	21.5 (70.7)	16.1 (61.0)	9.8 (49.6)	4.6 (40.3)	1.0 (33.8)	−1.4 (29.5)
Record low °C (°F)	−6.0 (21.2)	−5.4 (22.3)	−4.0 (24.8)	−1.4 (29.5)	3.7 (38.7)	9.0 (48.2)	14.4 (57.9)	13.5 (56.3)	11.2 (52.2)	4.3 (39.7)	−0.6 (30.9)	−3.0 (26.6)	−6.0 (21.2)
Average precipitation mm (inches)	48.7 (1.92)	62.0 (2.44)	96.9 (3.81)	98.4 (3.87)	146.6 (5.77)	183.5 (7.22)	175.8 (6.92)	101.8 (4.01)	181.3 (7.14)	160.8 (6.33)	95.9 (3.78)	62.7 (2.47)	1,414.4 (55.69)
Average snowfall cm (inches)	0 (0)	1 (0.4)	0 (0)	0 (0)	0 (0)	0 (0)	0 (0)	0 (0)	0 (0)	0 (0)	0 (0)	0 (0)	1 (0.4)
Average precipitation days (≥ 0.5 mm)	7.2	7.9	10.3	10.0	10.4	12.5	10.6	7.2	10.2	9.6	7.3	7.7	111.1
Average relative humidity (%)	61	61	60	61	64	72	73	70	69	67	66	63	66
Mean monthly sunshine hours	135.8	143.1	179.6	196.9	207.6	157.6	206.1	239.9	173.2	169.9	147.7	135.4	2,100.1
Source: Japan Meteorological Agency

== Demographics ==
Per Japanese census data, the population of Wakayama peaked in the 1980s and has been declining slowly since.

Historical population
Year	Pop.	±%
1960	285,155	—
1970	365,267	+28.1%
1980	400,802	+9.7%
1990	396,553	−1.1%
2000	386,551	−2.5%
2010	369,400	−4.4%

== History ==
The area of the modern city of Wakayama was the center of ancient Kii Province, and the Iwase-Senzuka Kofun Cluster is one of the largest clusters of kofun burial mounds in Japan. The area was the home of the Kii Kuni no miyatsuko, a local king ruling the Kinokawa River Valley prior to the rise of the Yamato State. During the Nara period priests from Tang China built the Kimii-dera temple. From the Muromachi period, Waka-no-ura was a port on the Kinokawa River, and Toyotomi Hideyoshi constructed the predecessor of Wakayama Castle during his conquest of Kii Province during the Sengoku period. During the Edo period, the castle town at the base of Wakayama Castle grew and prospered under the rule of the Kii Tokugawa clan as the center of Kishū Domain. After the Meiji restoration, Wakayama was granted city status on April 1, 1889 with the creation of the modern municipalities system. The city suffered 1208 deaths and 1560 critically wounded in the July 9, 1945 Bombing of Wakayama during World War II, which destroyed more than half of the urban area. On April 1, 1997, Wakayama attained core city status, with increased local autonomy.

== Government ==
Wakayama has a mayor-council form of government with a directly elected mayor and a unicameral city council of 38 members. Wakayama contributes 15 members to the Wakayama Prefectural Assembly. In terms of national politics, the city is divided between Wakayama 1st district and Wakayama 2nd district of the lower house of the Diet of Japan.

== Economy ==
Wakayama is the main commercial city of northern Wakayama and is the largest city in Wakayama Prefecture. Primary industries include agriculture, notably rice and citrus fruits, and commercial fishing. Secondary industries are centered around electronics and heavy industry. Nippon Steel remains a major employer, although the city suffered considerably when former Sumitomo Steel shifted much of its production to China. Other major employers include Kao Corporation and Mitsubishi Electric.

== Education ==
=== Colleges and universities ===
- Wakayama College of Science Studies
- Wakayama Medical University
- Wakayama Shin-ai University
- Wakayama University
- Takarazuka University of Medical and Health Care Medical School
- Tokyo Health Care University School of Nursing

=== Primary and secondary education ===
Wakayama has 50 public elementary schools, 19 public middle schools and one public high school operated by the city government and one private elementary school and three private middle schools. The Wakayama Prefectural Board of Education operates two public middle schools and 10 public high schools. There are also four private high schools. In addition, there is one elementary school and one high school run by Wakayama University.

The prefecture also operates five special education school for the handicapped, and one more is operated by Wakayama University.

The city has one North Korean school, Wakayama Korean Elementary and Middle School (和歌山朝鮮初中級学校).

== Transportation ==
=== Railway ===
JR West – Hanwa Line

- Kii - Musota - Kii-Nakanoshima - Wakayama

JR West – Kisei Main Line

- Kimiidera - Miyamae - Wakayama - Kiwa - Wakayamashi

JR West – Wakayama Line

- Kii-Ogura - Hoshiya - Senda - Tainose - Wakayama

Wakayama Electric Railway Kishigawa Line

- Wakayama - Tanakaguchi - Nichizengū - Kōzaki - Kamayama - Kōtsū Center Mae - Okazakimae - Kire - Idakiso - Sandō

Nankai Electric Railway Nankai Main Line

- Wakayamadaigakumae - Kinokawa - Wakayamashi

Nankai Electric Railway Wakayamako Line

- Wakayamashi - Wakayamakō

Nankai Electric Railway Kada Line

- Wakayamashi - Kinokawa - Higashi-Matsue - Nakamatsue - Hachimanmae - Nishinoshō - Nirigahama - Isonoura - Kada

=== Bus ===
- Wakayama Bus

=== Highway ===
- Hanwa Expressway
- Keinawa Expressway
- National Route 24
- National Route 26
- National Route 42

=== Air ===
Wakayama is close to Kansai International Airport which is 35 km away. Nanki–Shirahama Airport is also close which is located 65 km south east of the city. However, the airport only provides one daily flight to Tokyo which is operated by Japan Airlines.

== Sister cities ==
Wakayama has sister-city relationships with four overseas cities:

- Bakersfield, California, United States
- Jeju, Jeju Province, South Korea
- Jinan, Shandong, China
- Richmond, British Columbia, Canada

Wakayama City formed a sister-city relationship with the city of Jinan mainly due to the efforts of Hiroshi Yamazaki (山崎 宏), who was an escaped medic in the Imperial Japanese Army and stayed in China after the war. He married and runs his own clinic in China. In 1976, he visited Wakayama after nearly 40 years.

== Local attractions ==
- Hinokuma Shrine
- Itakiso Shrine
- Kamayama Shrine
- Kimiidera
- Kishū Tōshō-gū
- The Museum of Modern Art, Wakayama
- Wakayama Castle
- Wakayama Marina City
- Wakayama is home to one of Japan's three Melody Roads, which is made from grooves cut into the pavement, which when driven over causes a tactile vibration and audible rumbling transmitted through the wheels into the car body.

Wakayama Prefecture is famous across Japan for its umeboshi (salty pickled plums) and mikan (mandarins).

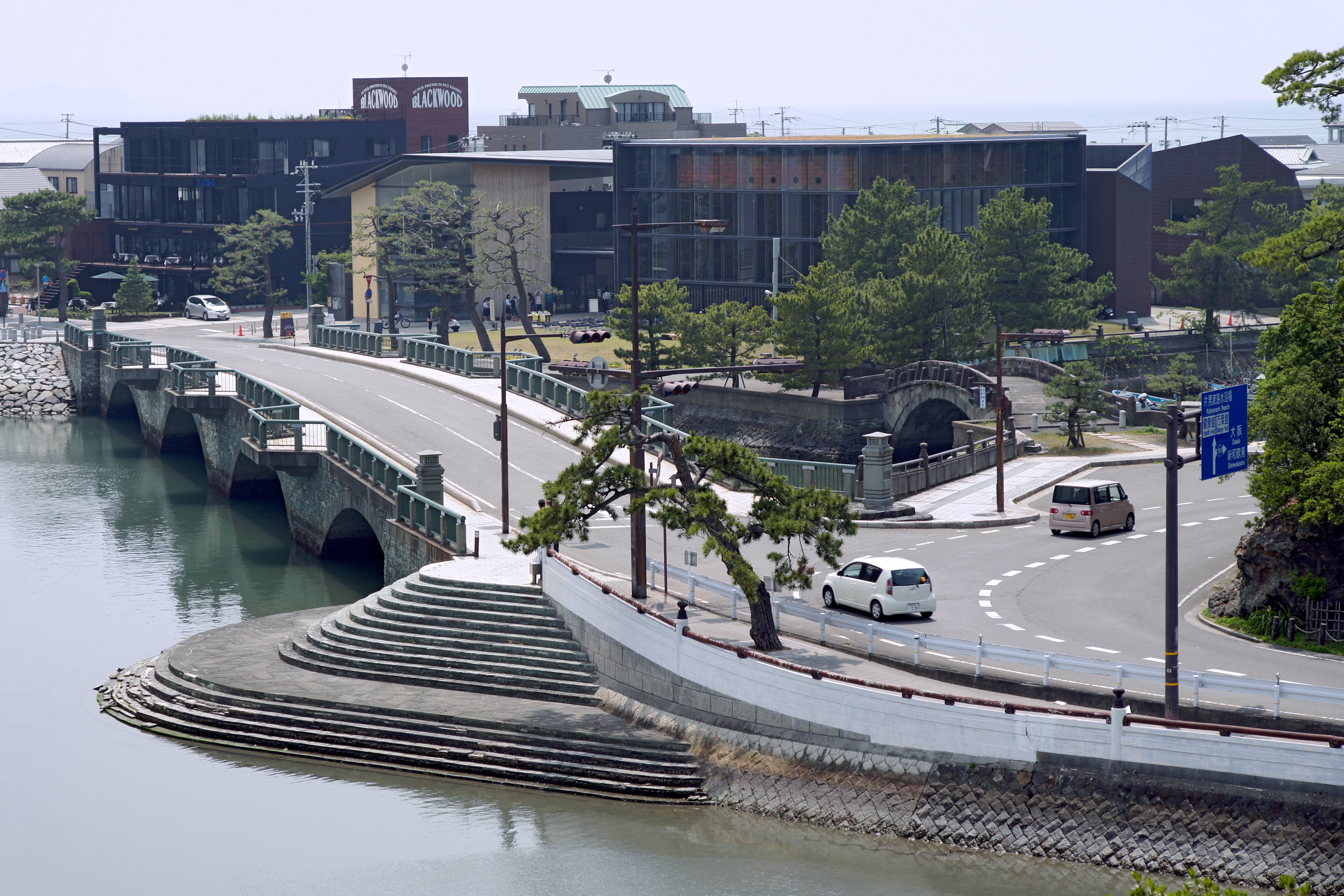
Art Cube of Wakanoura

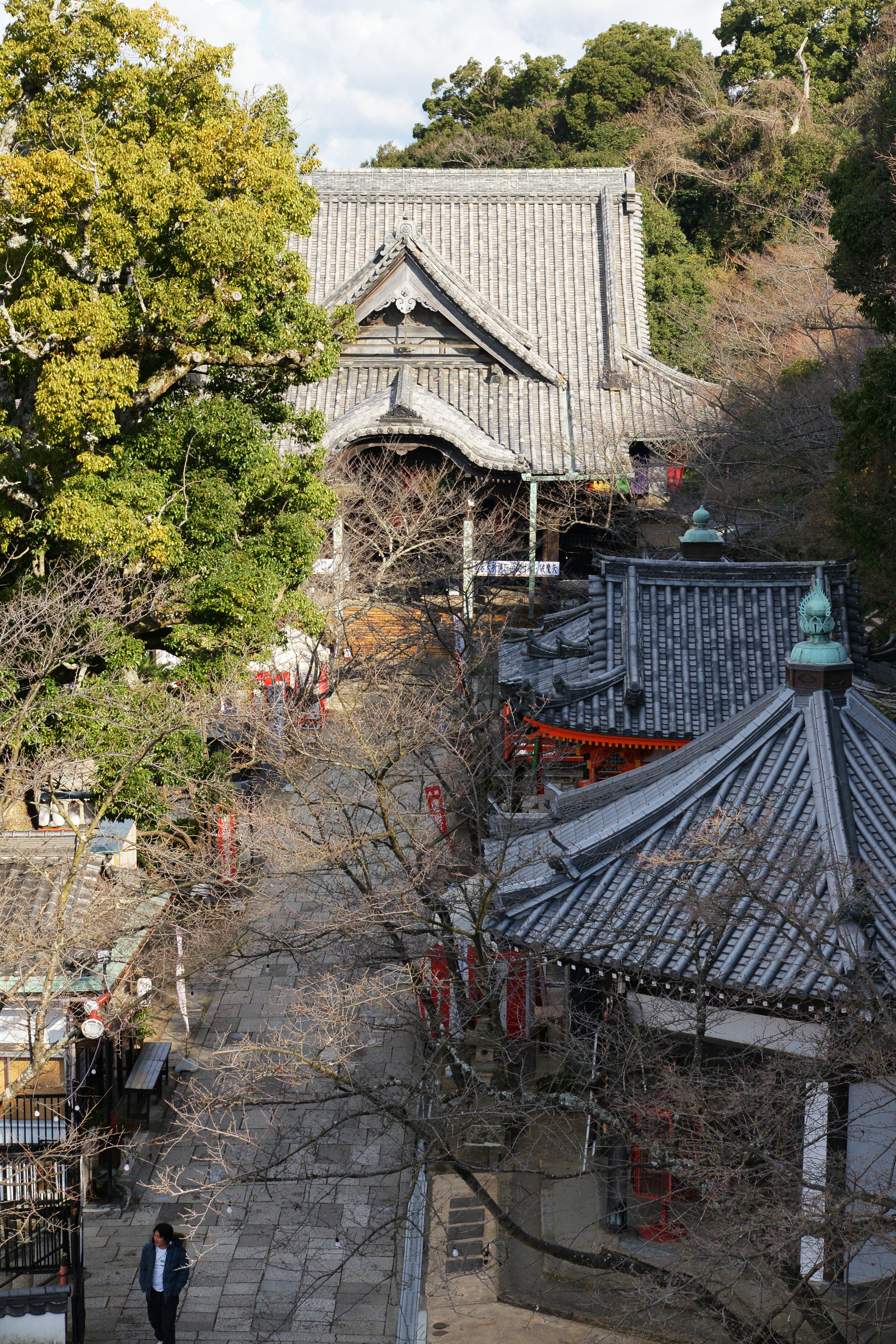
Kimiidera

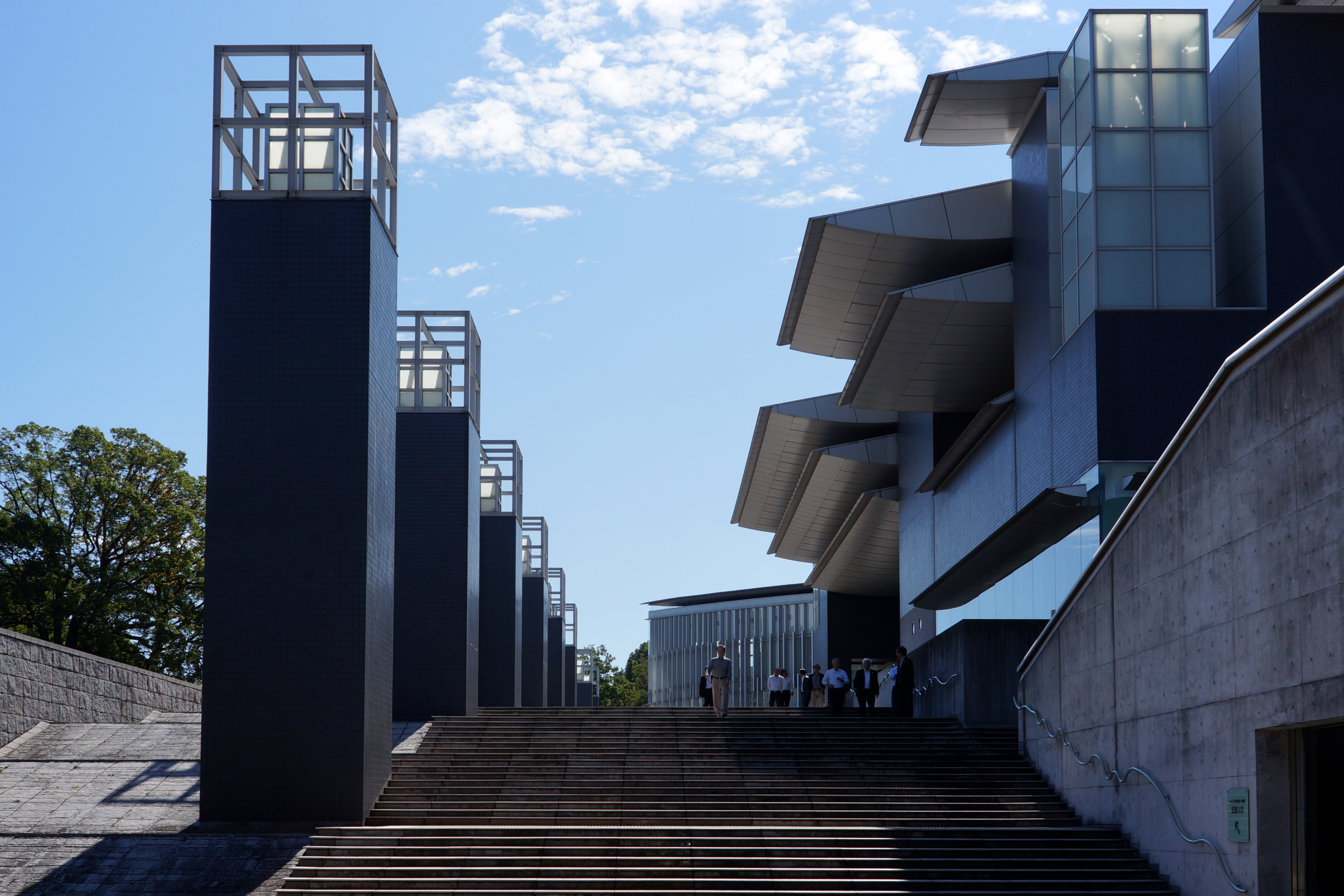
The Museum of Modern Art, Wakayama
