= Dickson High School (Oklahoma) =

Coordinates: 34.185399°N 97.085134°W

Location
- 4762 State Highway 199; Dickson, Oklahoma 73401; United States

Information
- Type: Co-educational, public, secondary
- Principal: Jelana Aaron
- Teaching staff: 16.57 (FTE)
- Grades: 9-12
- Enrollment: 375 (2023-2024)
- Student to teacher ratio: 22.63
- Colors: Blue, black, and white
- Mascot: Comet the Dog
- Team name: Comets

Dickson High School is located in Dickson, Oklahoma, United States. It includes grades 9–12. Its athletic teams are known as the Comets. Its colors are blue, black, and white. It was awarded the Blue Ribbon for academic success.

== Awards ==
The school's honors include 2008 state powerlifting champions in the large school class (classes 3A-6A), 2008 class 3A state powerlifting champions, and several skeet shoot state championships.
