= Kada Line =

Railway line in Japan

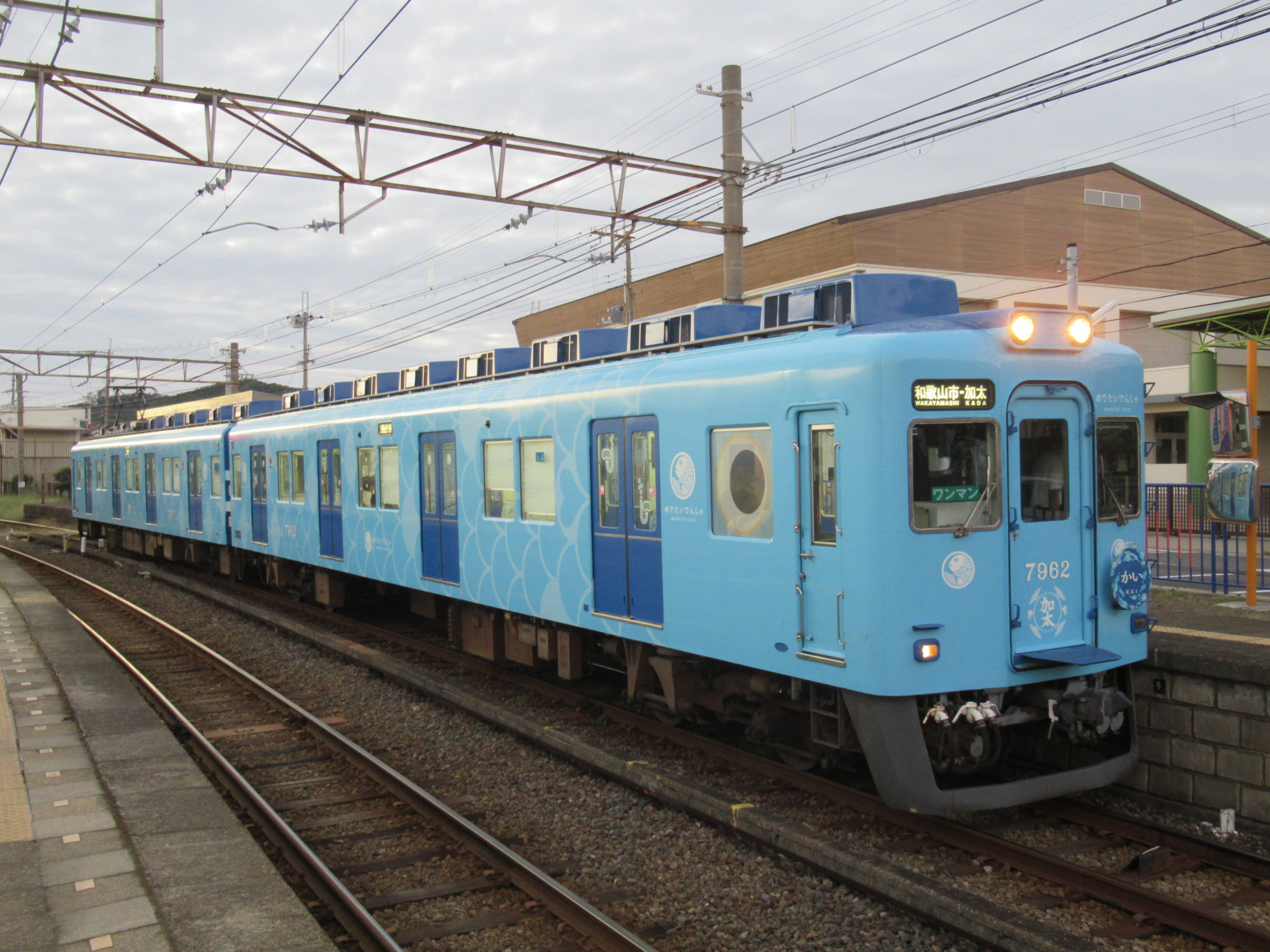
- Nankai 7100 series Medetai Densha Kai

Overview
- Other name: Kada Sakana Line
- Native name: 加太線
- Locale: Wakayama Prefecture
- Termini: Kinokawa; Kada

Service
- Operator(s): Nankai Electric Railway Co., Ltd.

History
- Opened: 16 June 1912; 113 years ago
- Closed: 1966 (Kitajima Branch Line)

Technical
- Line length: 9.6 km (6.0 mi)
- Number of tracks: Single
- Track gauge: 1,067 mm (3 ft 6 in)
- Electrification: 1,500 V DC, overhead lines
- Operating speed: 80 km/h (50 mph)

The Kada Line (加太線, Kada-sen) is a railway line in Wakayama Prefecture owned by Nankai Electric Railway. This line connects to the Nankai Main Line. In November 2014, it began to be referred to by the nickname Kada Sakana Line (加太さかな線).

== History ==
The Kada Light Railway Co. opened the line in 1912, electrifying it at 1500 VDC in 1930.

The company merged with Nankai in 1942, and freight services ceased in 1984.

== Stations ==
No.	Station name	Distance (km)	Connecting lines	Location
Nankai Main Line
NK45	Wakayamashi 和歌山市	2.6	Nankai Electric Railway: Wakayamakō Line; West Japan Railway Company: Kisei Main Line	Wakayama, Wakayama
Kada Line
NK44	Kinokawa 紀ノ川	0.0	Nankai Electric Railway: Nankai Main Line	Wakayama, Wakayama
NK44-1	Higashi-Matsue 東松江	2.6		Wakayama, Wakayama
NK44-2	Nakamatsue 中松江	3.3		Wakayama, Wakayama
NK44-3	Hachimanmae 八幡前	4.4		Wakayama, Wakayama
NK44-4	Nishinoshō 西ノ庄	5.5		Wakayama, Wakayama
NK44-5	Nirigahama 二里ヶ浜	6.2		Wakayama, Wakayama
NK44-6	Isonoura 磯ノ浦	7.1		Wakayama, Wakayama
NK44-7	Kada 加太	9.6		Wakayama, Wakayama
