= Connerville, Oklahoma =

- Census-designated place
- Location within Oklahoma Location within the United States
- Coordinates: 34°26′17″N 96°38′10″W
- Country: United States
- State: Oklahoma
- County: Johnston

Area
  - Total: 2.01 sq mi (5.20 km^{2})
  - Land: 2.00 sq mi (5.19 km^{2})
  - Water: 0.0039 sq mi (0.01 km^{2})
- Elevation: 1,014 ft (309 m)

Population (2020)
  - Total: 59
  - Density: 29.4/sq mi (11.37/km^{2})
- Time zone: UTC-6 (Central (CST))
  - Summer (DST): UTC-5 (CDT)
- ZIP code: 74836
- FIPS code: 40-16700
- GNIS feature ID: 2629914

Connerville is a rural unincorporated community and census-designated place on the Blue River in Johnston County, Oklahoma, United States. The post office opened August 6, 1897, in District 16 of the old Indian Territory. The ZIP Code is 74836. It is said to have been named for George B. Conner, the first postmaster.

The Census Bureau defined a census-designated place ("CDP") for Connerville in 2015; the 2010 population within the 2015 CDP boundary was 80 and contained 42 housing units. The population was 59 as of the 2020 Census.

== Demographics ==
Historical population
Census	Pop.	Note	%±
2020	59		—
U.S. Decennial Census

=== 2020 census ===
As of the 2020 census, Connerville had a population of 59. The median age was 47.2 years. 35.6% of residents were under the age of 18 and 13.6% of residents were 65 years of age or older. For every 100 females there were 103.4 males, and for every 100 females age 18 and over there were 123.5 males age 18 and over.

0.0% of residents lived in urban areas, while 100.0% lived in rural areas.

There were 16 households in Connerville, of which 6.3% had children under the age of 18 living in them. Of all households, 56.3% were married-couple households, 25.0% were households with a male householder and no spouse or partner present, and 12.5% were households with a female householder and no spouse or partner present. About 31.3% of all households were made up of individuals and 6.3% had someone living alone who was 65 years of age or older.

There were 31 housing units, of which 48.4% were vacant. The homeowner vacancy rate was 17.6% and the rental vacancy rate was 33.3%.

Racial composition as of the 2020 census
Race	Number	Percent
White	24	40.7%
Black or African American	1	1.7%
American Indian and Alaska Native	32	54.2%
Asian	0	0.0%
Native Hawaiian and Other Pacific Islander	0	0.0%
Some other race	0	0.0%
Two or more races	2	3.4%
Hispanic or Latino (of any race)	4	6.8%

== Sources ==
- Shirk, George H. Oklahoma Place Names. Norman: University of Oklahoma Press, 1987. ISBN 0-8061-2028-2 .
