= Wakayama Medical University =

- 和歌山県立医科大学
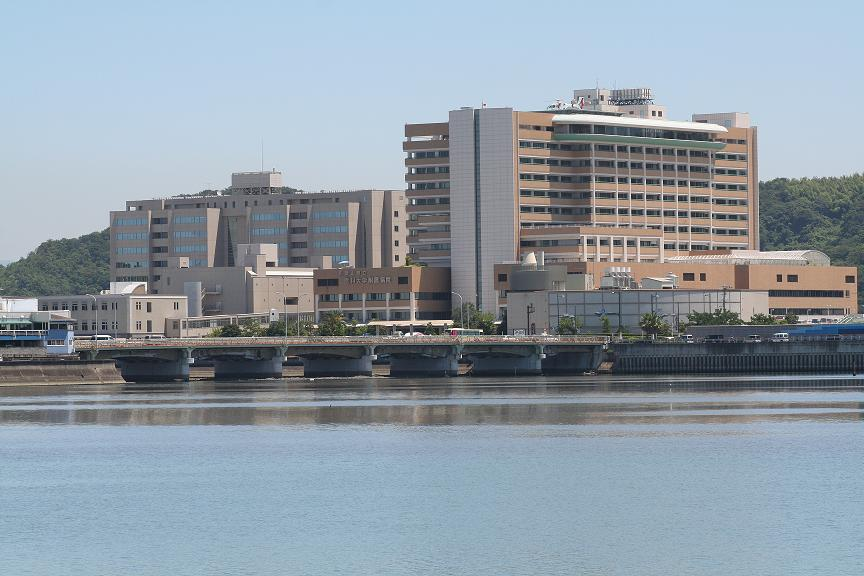
- Overview of the University
- Type: Public university
- Established: 1945
- Location: Wakayama, Wakayama, Japan
- Campus: Kimiidera Campus 34°11′22.8″N 135°10′53.9″E Mikazura Campus 34°11′43″N 135°11′24.6″E
- Website: https://www.wakayama-med.ac.jp/english/index.html

Wakayama Medical University (和歌山県立医科大学, Wakayama kenritsu ika daigaku) is a public university in Wakayama, Wakayama, Japan. The predecessor of the school was founded in 1945, and it was chartered as a university in 1948.
