= Dickson, Oklahoma =

- Town
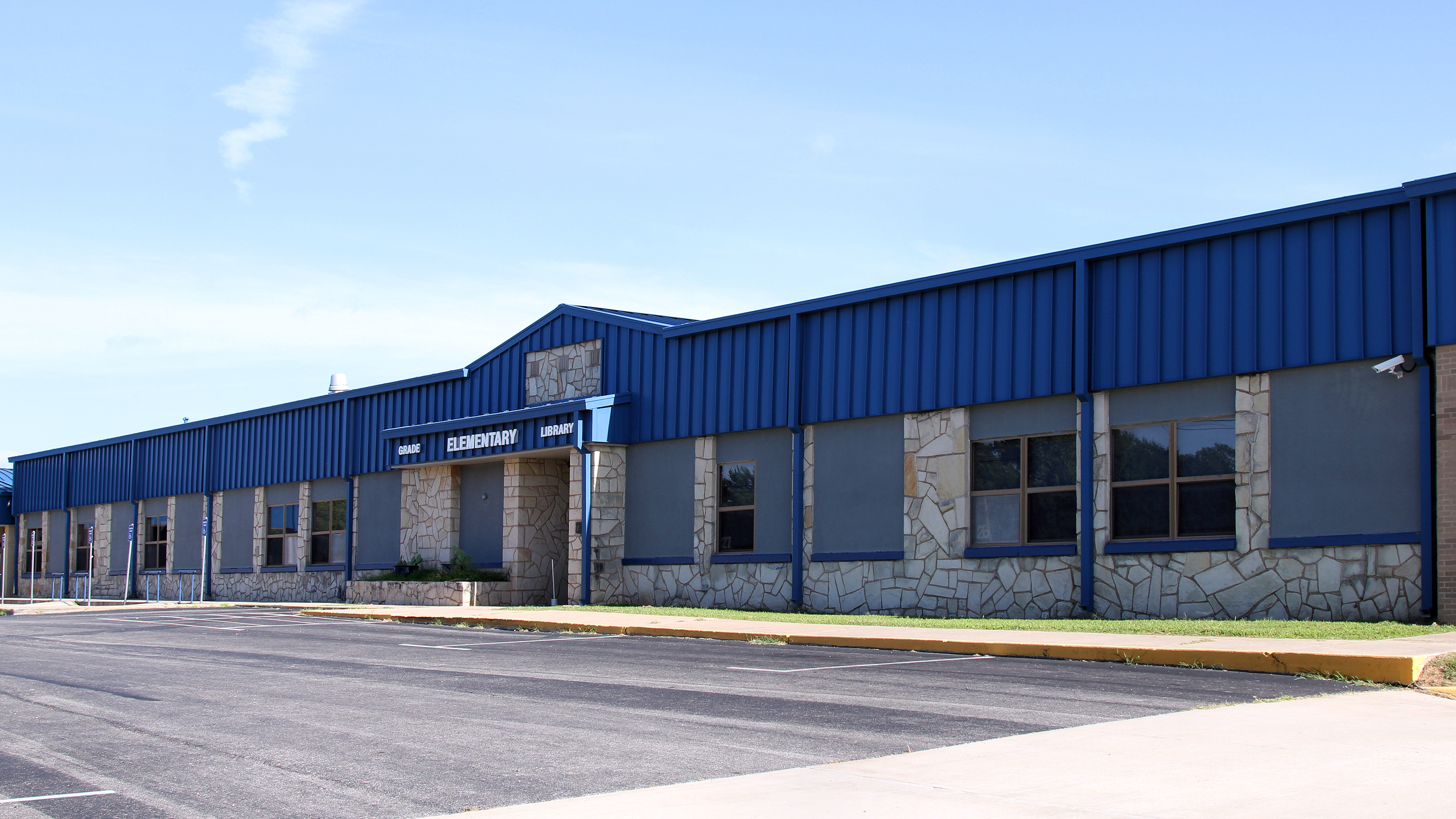
- Dickson Elementary School

- Location within the state of Oklahoma
- Coordinates: 34°11′16″N 96°59′49″W
- Country: United States
- State: Oklahoma
- County: Carter

Area
  - Total: 14.08 sq mi (36.47 km^{2})
  - Land: 13.97 sq mi (36.17 km^{2})
  - Water: 0.12 sq mi (0.30 km^{2})
- Elevation: 856 ft (261 m)

Population (2020)
  - Total: 1,331
  - Density: 95/sq mi (36.8/km^{2})
- Time zone: UTC-6 (Central (CST))
  - Summer (DST): UTC-5 (CST)
- ZIP codes: 73401
- Area code: 580
- FIPS code: 40-20700
- GNIS feature ID: 2412429
- Website: www.dicksonok.org

Dickson is a town in Carter County, Oklahoma, United States. As of the 2020 census, Dickson had a population of 1,331. It is part of the Ardmore, Oklahoma Micropolitan Statistical Area.

== Geography ==
Dickson is located at the eastern end of Carter County. It is bordered to the west by Ardmore, the county seat, to the east by Mannsville in Johnston County, and to the south partially by Marshall County.

U.S. Route 177 passes through the center of town, leading north 23 miles (37 km) to Sulphur and southeast 16 miles (26 km) to Madill. Oklahoma State Highway 199 leads west from the center of Dickson 10 miles (16 km) to the center of Ardmore.

According to the United States Census Bureau, Dickson has a total area of 14.1 square miles (36.5 km^{2}), of which 14.0 square miles (36.2 km^{2}) is land and 0.12 square miles (0.3 km^{2}), or 0.81%, is water.

== Demographics ==
Historical population
Census	Pop.	Note	%±
1970	798		—
1980	996		24.8%
1990	942		−5.4%
2000	1,139		20.9%
2010	1,207		6.0%
2020	1,331		10.3%
U.S. Decennial Census

=== 2020 census ===
As of the 2020 census, Dickson had a population of 1,331. The median age was 41.9 years. 22.8% of residents were under the age of 18 and 16.7% of residents were 65 years of age or older. For every 100 females there were 108.9 males, and for every 100 females age 18 and over there were 102.6 males age 18 and over.

0.0% of residents lived in urban areas, while 100.0% lived in rural areas.

There were 508 households in Dickson, of which 33.1% had children under the age of 18 living in them. Of all households, 57.7% were married-couple households, 18.5% were households with a male householder and no spouse or partner present, and 19.3% were households with a female householder and no spouse or partner present. About 22.2% of all households were made up of individuals and 11.0% had someone living alone who was 65 years of age or older.

There were 566 housing units, of which 10.2% were vacant. The homeowner vacancy rate was 1.8% and the rental vacancy rate was 15.6%.

Racial composition as of the 2020 census
Race	Number	Percent
White	1,041	78.2%
Black or African American	13	1.0%
American Indian and Alaska Native	127	9.5%
Asian	6	0.5%
Native Hawaiian and Other Pacific Islander	0	0.0%
Some other race	46	3.5%
Two or more races	98	7.4%
Hispanic or Latino (of any race)	49	3.7%

=== 2000 census ===
As of the census of 2000, there were 1,139 people, 417 households, and 334 families residing in the town. The population density was 80.4 inhabitants per square mile (31.0/km^{2}). There were 462 housing units at an average density of 32.6 per square mile (12.6/km^{2}). The racial makeup of the town was 85.34% White, 0.44% African American, 10.18% Native American, 0.18% from other races, and 3.86% from two or more races. Hispanic or Latino of any race were 1.84% of the population.

There were 417 households, out of which 35.0% had children under the age of 18 living with them, 66.7% were married couples living together, 9.8% had a female householder with no husband present, and 19.9% were non-families. 18.9% of all households were made up of individuals, and 7.2% had someone living alone who was 65 years of age or older. The average household size was 2.73 and the average family size was 3.10.

In the town, the population was spread out, with 27.7% under the age of 18, 7.6% from 18 to 24, 27.8% from 25 to 44, 25.4% from 45 to 64, and 11.5% who were 65 years of age or older. The median age was 37 years. For every 100 females, there were 98.1 males. For every 100 females age 18 and over, there were 97.4 males.

The median income for a household in the town was $33,409, and the median income for a family was $39,375. Males had a median income of $28,571 versus $21,188 for females. The per capita income for the town was $14,821. About 6.2% of families and 8.6% of the population were below the poverty line, including 7.1% of those under age 18 and 10.2% of those age 65 or over.

== Education ==
Dickson public schools serve the town of Dickson. Several Carter county schools have consolidated into the Dickson school district, and it is one of the largest districts in Oklahoma. In the mid-1990s, the cross country team won the state tournament for three years in a row. The powerlifting team won the Oklahoma Large-School team championship in 2008. Dickson High School has been named a Blue Ribbon School of Excellence by the United States Department of Education.
