= KYKC =

- Byng, Oklahoma; United States
- Broadcast area: Ada, Oklahoma
- Frequency: 100.1 MHz
- Branding: Continuous Hit Country

Programming
- Format: Country music

Ownership
- Owner: Chickasaw Nation

Technical information
- Licensing authority: FCC
- Facility ID: 9941
- Class: C2
- ERP: 50,000 watts
- HAAT: 150 meters (490 ft)
- Transmitter coordinates: 34.85306°N 96.76444°W

Links
- Public license information: Public file; LMS
- Website: kykc.net

KYKC (100.1 FM) is a radio station licensed to Byng, Oklahoma. The station broadcasts a country music format and is owned by the Chickasaw Nation.

== History ==
Previous logo

=== Controversy ===
On February 13, 2024, a listener requested Oklahoma S.C.O.R.E. country station KYKC play "Texas Hold 'Em". The general manager Roger Harris replied, writing, "We do not play Beyoncé on KYKC as we are a country music station." The answer went viral and caused a stir on social media against country music stations, leading Beyoncé's fans to flood the radio station with requests to play the song and started trending on Twitter with #Beyonceiscountry. After adding the song to radio rotation, a representative from S.C.O.R.E. responded to racism and boycott accusations against the singer's music with a statement: "We are a small market station. We're not in a position to break an artist or help it that much, so it has to chart a little bit higher for us to add it. But we love Beyoncé here. We play her on our [other top 40 and adult hits stations] but we're not playing her on our country station yet because it just came out." The station further clarified its position, saying it was unaware the song had a country sound until staff members heard it, and subsequently added it to their playlist.
