= KTLS-FM =

- Holdenville, Oklahoma; United States
- Broadcast area: Ada, Oklahoma; Holdenville, Oklahoma
- Frequency: 106.5 MHz
- Branding: 106.5 Boss FM

Programming
- Format: Classic rock

Ownership
- Owner: The Chickasaw Nation

History
- First air date: 1991

Technical information
- Licensing authority: FCC
- Facility ID: 28053
- Class: C3
- ERP: 25,000 watts
- HAAT: 100 meters (330 ft)
- Transmitter coordinates: 34.91389°N 96.52222°W

Links
- Public license information: Public file; LMS
- Website: ktlsradio.com

KTLS-FM is a radio station airing a classic rock format licensed to Holdenville, Oklahoma, United States, broadcasting on 106.5 FM. The station serves the areas of Holdenville and Ada, Oklahoma, and is owned by The Chickasaw Nation.
