= KXFC =

- Coalgate, Oklahoma; United States
- Broadcast area: Ada, Oklahoma
- Frequency: 105.5 MHz
- Branding: The X Factor

Programming
- Format: Contemporary hit radio
- Affiliations: Premiere Networks

Ownership
- Owner: The Chickasaw Nation

Technical information
- Licensing authority: FCC
- Facility ID: 82533
- Class: C3
- ERP: 20,000 watts
- HAAT: 111 meters (364 ft)
- Transmitter coordinates: 34.69528°N 96.38806°W

Links
- Public license information: Public file; LMS
- Webcast: Listen live
- Website: kxfcradio.com

KXFC (105.5 FM) is a radio station licensed to Coalgate, Oklahoma. The station broadcasts a contemporary hit radio format and is owned by The Chickasaw Nation.

Former logo
