= Kada Station =

Railway station in Wakayama, Wakayama Prefecture, Japan

Kada Station 加太駅
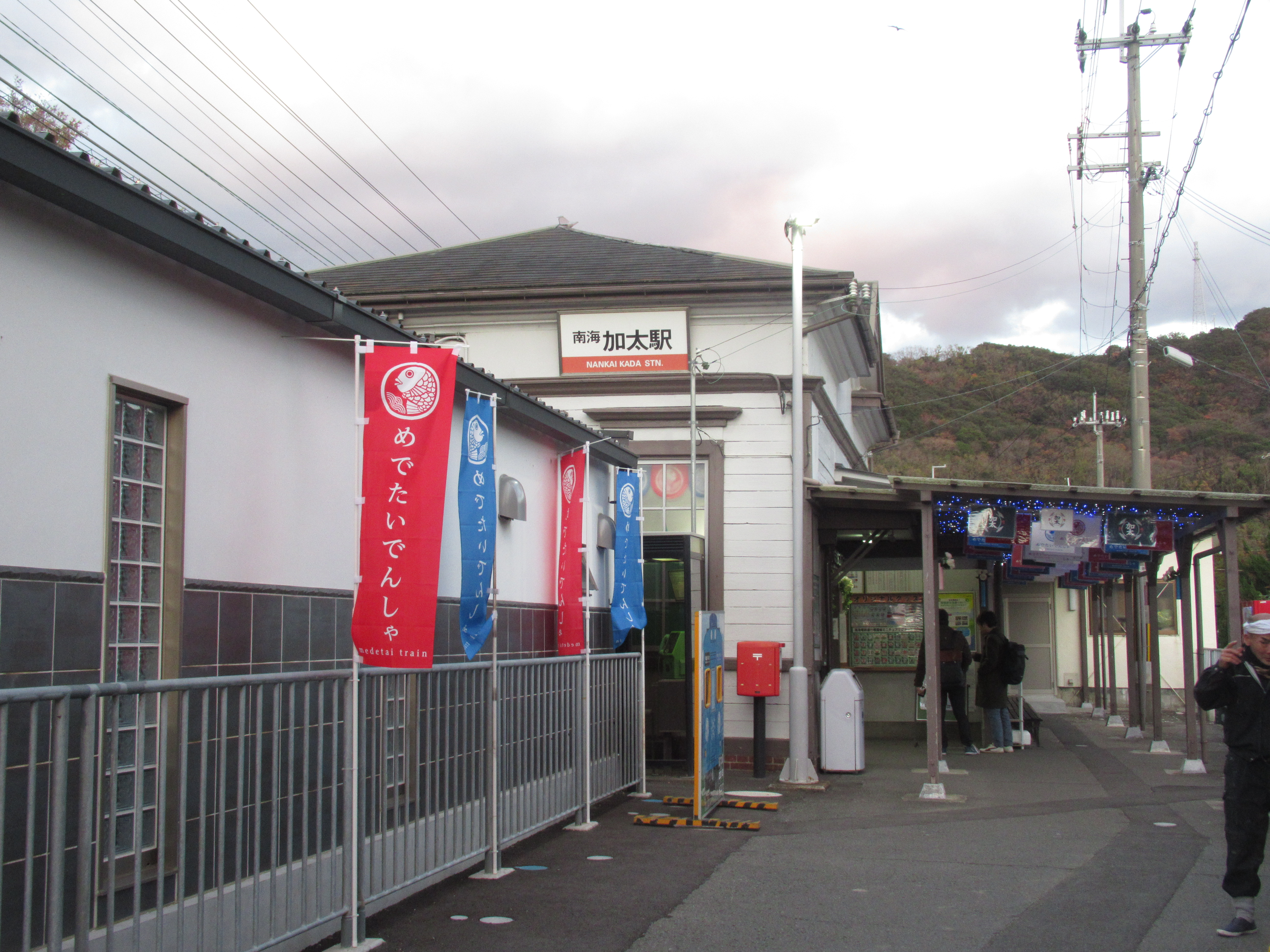
- Kada Station, December 2018

General information
- Location: 1038-1 Kada, Wakayama-shi, Wakayama-ken 640-0103; Japan
- Coordinates: 34°16′30.46″N 135°4′51.88″E
- Operator: Nankai Electric Railway
- Line: Kada Line
- Platforms: 1 side platform

Construction
- Structure type: At-grade

Other information
- Station code: NK44-7
- Website: Official website

History
- Opened: June 16, 1912

Passengers
- FY2019: 660 daily

Services
Preceding station	Nankai Electric Railway	Following station
Terminus	Kada Line	Isonoura towards Wakayamashi
Location
- Location within Wakayama Prefecture Location within Japan

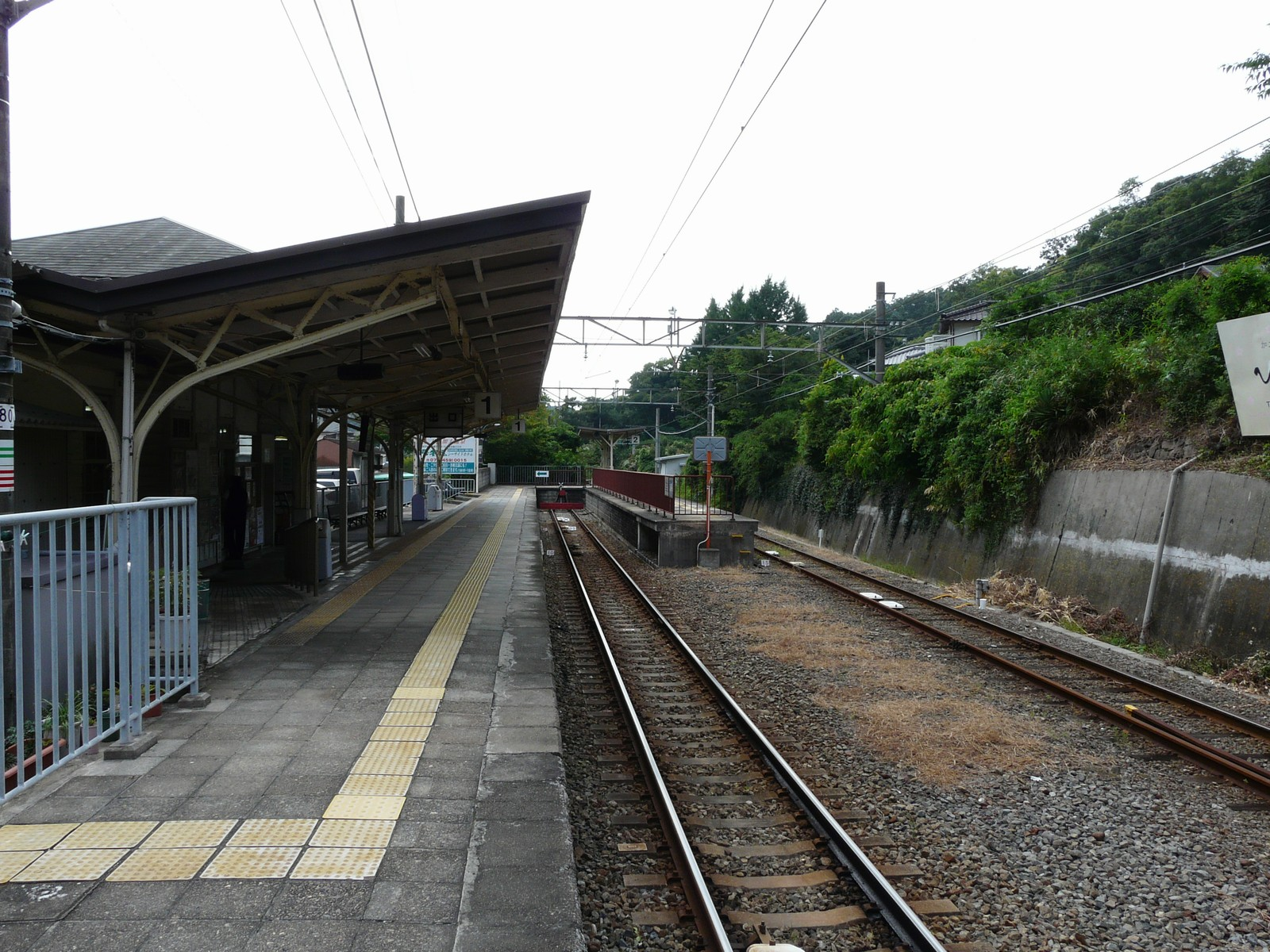
Platforms

Kada Station (加太駅, Kada-eki) is a passenger railway station located in the city of Wakayama, Wakayama Prefecture, Japan, operated by the private railway company Nankai Electric Railway.

== Lines ==
Kada Station is served by the Kada Line, and has the station number "NK44-7". It is located 9.6 kilometers from the terminus of the line at Kinokawa Station and 12.2 kilometers from Wakayamashi Station.

== Station layout ==
The station consists of a bay platform serving two tracks.

=== Platforms ===
1	■ Nankai Kada Line	for Wakayamashi
2	■ Nankai Kada Line	for Wakayamashi

== History ==
Kada Station opened on June 16, 1912.

== Passenger statistics ==
In fiscal 2019, the station was used by an average of 660 passengers daily (boarding passengers only).

== Surrounding area ==
- Kada beach
- Awashima Shrine
- Kada Kasuga Shrine
- Kada Port

== See also ==
- List of railway stations in Japan
