= Kinokawa Station =

Railway station in Wakayama, Wakayama Prefecture, Japan

Kinokawa Station 紀ノ川駅
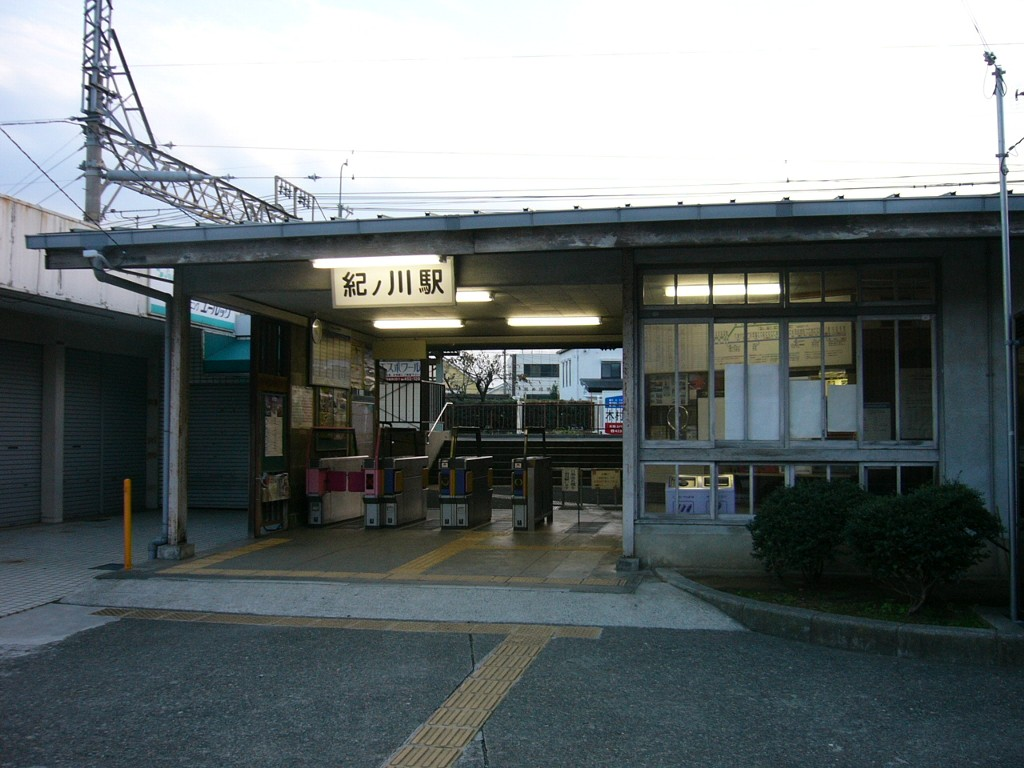
- Kinokawa Station in November 2004

General information
- Location: 162-3, Ichishōji, Wakayama-shi, Wakayama-ken 640-8464; Japan
- Coordinates: 34°15′17.83″N 135°9′56.83″E
- Operator: Nankai Electric Railway
- Lines: Nankai Main Line; Kada Line
- Distance: 61.6 km from Nanba
- Platforms: 2 side platforms

Construction
- Structure type: Elevated
- Cycle facilities: Yes
- Accessible: Yes

Other information
- Station code: NK44
- Website: Official website

History
- Opened: October 22, 1898
- Former names: Wakayama-Kitaguchi Station (to 1903)

Passengers
- 2019: 2,786 daily

Services
Preceding station	Nankai Electric Railway	Following station
Wakayamadaigakumae NK43 towards Namba	Nankai Main Line Local Sub. Express	Wakayamashi NK45 Terminus
Higashi-Matsue NK44-1 towards Kada	Kada Line	Wakayamashi NK45 Terminus
Location
- Location within Wakayama Prefecture Location within Japan

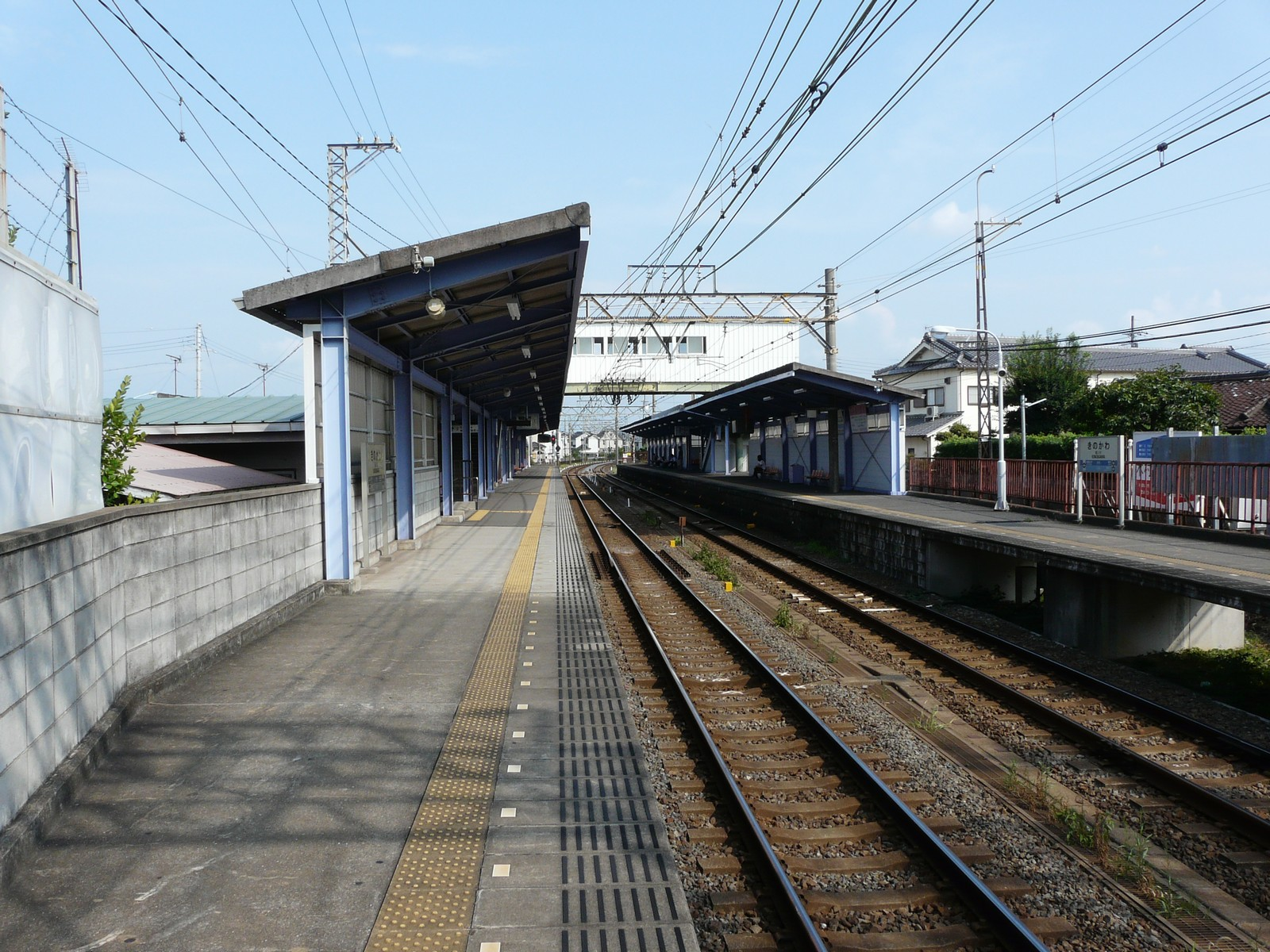
Platforms

Kinokawa Station (紀ノ川駅, Kinokawa-eki) is a junction passenger railway station located in the city of Wakayama, Wakayama Prefecture, Japan, operated by the private railway operator Nankai Electric Railway.

== Lines ==
Kinokawa Station is served by the Nankai Main Line and is 61.6 kilometers from the terminus of the line at Nanba. It is also the official terminus of the 9.6 kilometer Kada Line, however most trains continue the remaining 2.6 kilometers to terminate at Wakayamashi.

== Station layout ==
The station consists of two opposed side platforms connected by a footbridge.

=== Platforms ===
1	■ Nankai Line, Kada Line	for Wakayamashi
2	■ Nankai Line	for Namba and Kansai Airport
2	■ Kada Line	for Kada

== History ==
Kinokawa Station opened on October 22, 1898 as Wakayama-Kitaguchi Station (和歌山北口駅). It was renamed March 21, 1903.

== Passenger statistics ==
In fiscal 2019, the station was used by an average of 2786 passengers daily (boarding passengers only).

== Surrounding area ==
- Wakayama Prefectural Wakayama Kita High School Station East

== See also ==
- List of railway stations in Japan
