= Wakayamashi Station =

Railway station in Wakayama, Wakayama Prefecture, Japan

Wakayamashi Station 和歌山市駅
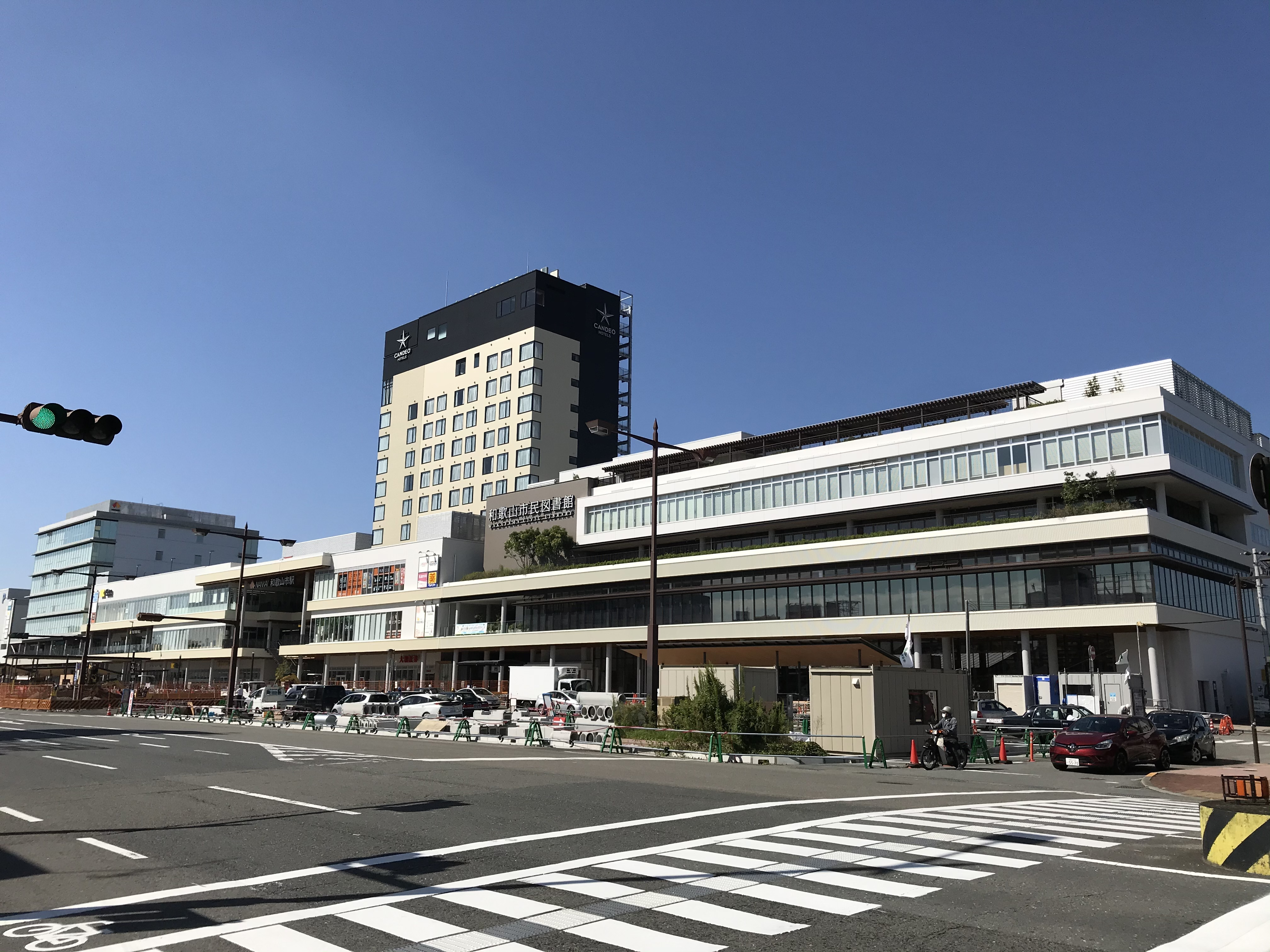
- Wakayamashi Station in October 2020

General information
- Location: 3-1 Nishi-Kuramaechō, Wakayama-shi, Wakayama-ken 640-8203; Japan
- Coordinates: 34.236393°N 135.167048°E
- Operator: Nankai Electric Railway; JR West
- Lines: Nankai Main Line; Kada Line; Wakayamakō Line; Kinokuni Line
- Platforms: 1 island + 3 bay platforms
- Connections: Bus terminal

Construction
- Structure type: At-grade

Other information
- Station code: NK45 (Nankai)
- Website: Official website

History
- Opened: March 21 1903

Passengers
- FY2019: 4340 daily (JR); 16,455 daily Nankai

Services
Preceding station	Nankai Electric Railway	Following station
Kinokawa NK44 towards Namba	Nankai Main Line Local	through to Wakayamakō Line
Kinokawa NK44 towards Namba	Nankai Main Line Sub. Express	Terminus
Wakayamadaigakumae NK43 towards Namba	Nankai Main Line Express	through to Wakayamakō Line
Wakayamadaigakumae NK43 towards Namba	Southern	Wakayamakō NK45-1 Terminus
through to Nankai Main Line	Wakayamakō Line Local Express	Wakayamakō NK45-1 Terminus
Kinokawa NK44 towards Kada	Kada Line	Terminus
Preceding station	JR West	Following station
Kiwa towards Wakayama	Kinokuni Line	Terminus
Location
- Location within Wakayama Prefecture Location within Japan

Wakayamashi Station (和歌山市駅, Wakayamashi-eki) is an interchange passenger railway station located in the city of Wakayama, Wakayama Prefecture, Japan, operated by the private railway company Nankai Electric Railway. To distinguish it from Wakayama Station (JR West, Wakayama Railway), the station is called "City Station (市駅, Shi-eki)".

== Lines ==
Wakayamashi Station has the Nankai station number "NK45" and is served by Nankai Electric Railways Nankai Main Line, Kada Line and Wakayamako Line. It is located 64.2 kilometers from Nanba. It is also served by the Kisei Main Line, operated by West Japan Railway Company and is 384.2 kilometers from the terminus of that line at Kameyama and 3.3 kilometers from Wakayama

== Station layout ==
Track Layout

The station has one ground-level island platform and three bay platforms serving six tracks, and each platform is connected by a footbridge from the ticket gates on the second floor of the station building.

=== Platforms ===
2	■ JR West; Kisei Line	for Wakayama (connecting to Kinokuni Line and Wakayama Line at Wakayama)
-	■ Nankai Railway	alighting passengers only; not used for boarding
3	■ Nankai Railway; Kada Line	for Kada
4, 5	■ Nankai Railway; Nankai Line	for Namba (Southern limited express trains depart from platform 4); Change trains at Izumisano for Kansai Airport
4, 5	■ Nankai Railway; Wakayamako Line	for Wakayamako (Southern limited express trains depart from platform 4)
6	■ Nankai Railway; Nankai Line	for Namba (some local trains); Change trains at Izumisano for Kansai Airport
7	■ Nankai Railway; Wakayamako Line	

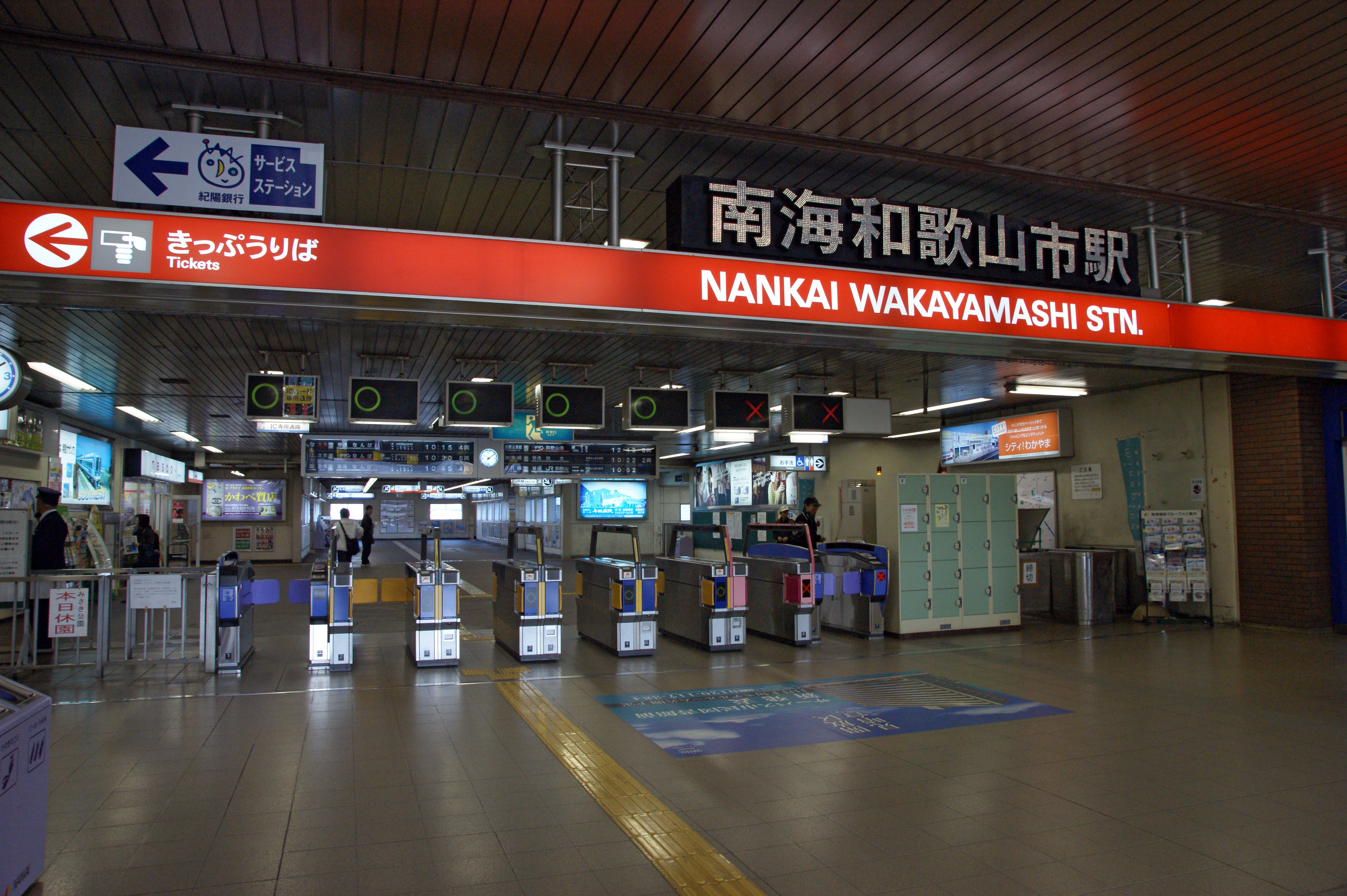
Ticket gates

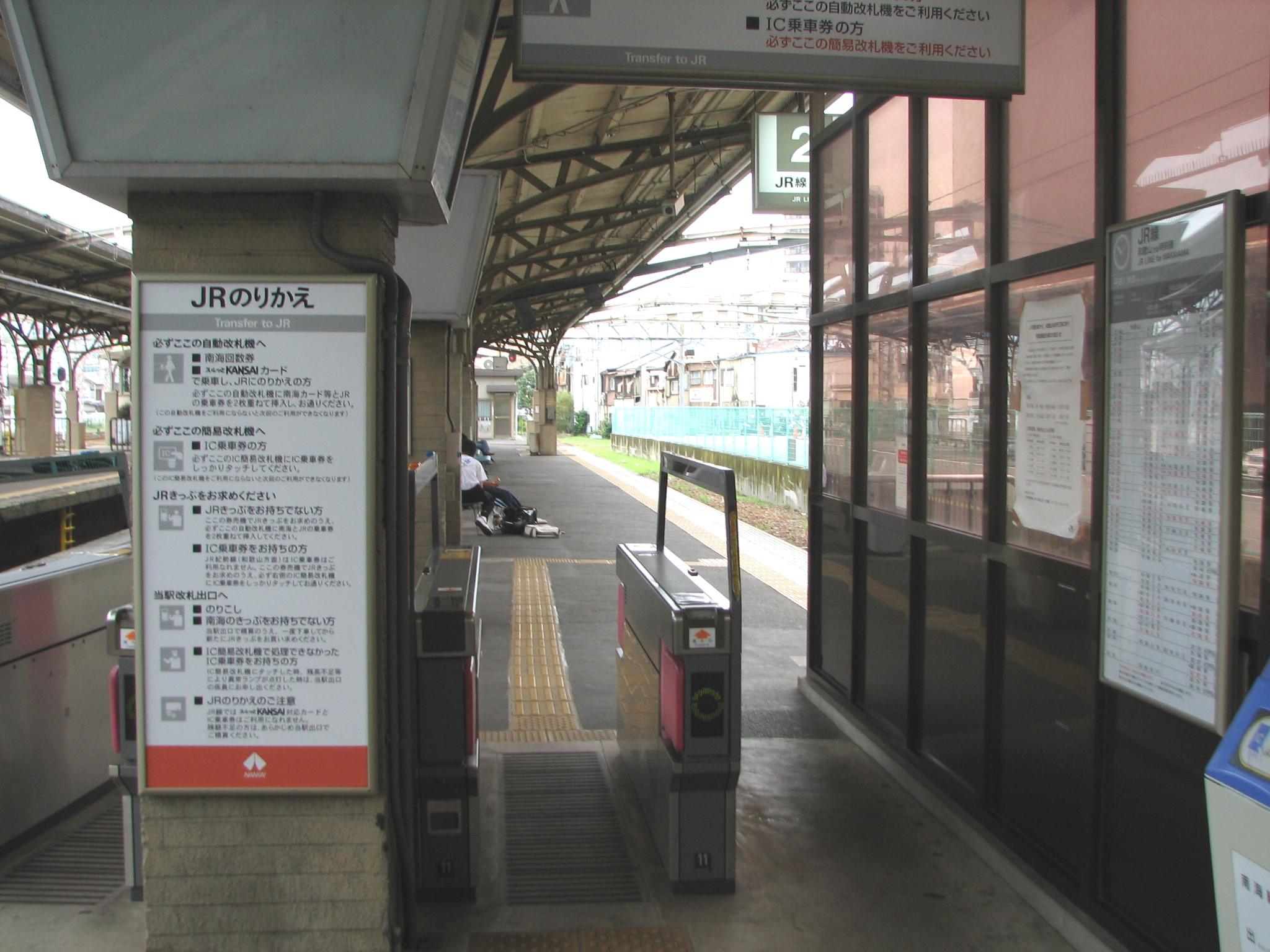
Platform 2

== History ==
Wakayamashi Station opened on March 21 1903.

== Passenger statistics ==
In fiscal 2019, the JR portion of the station was used by an average of 4,340 passengers daily. During the same period, the Nankai Railway portion of the station was used by 16,455 passengers daily.

== Surrounding area ==
- Wakayama Civic Library
- Wakayama Castle
- Wakayama Velodrome
- Wakayama City Museum
- Wakayama City Children's Science Museum

== See also ==
- List of railway stations in Japan
