= Danjiri Matsuri =

Japanese cart-pulling festivals

Danjiri Matsuri are cart-pulling festivals held in Japan. The Kishiwada Danjiri Matsuri is probably the most famous. There are other Danjiri Matsuri held in the City of Kobe and Haruki Town, but they are less popular and spectacular. The highlight of the Festival is a race between floats representing different neighborhoods.

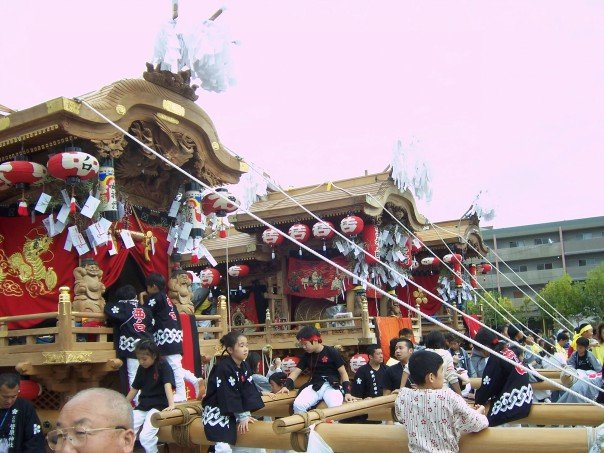

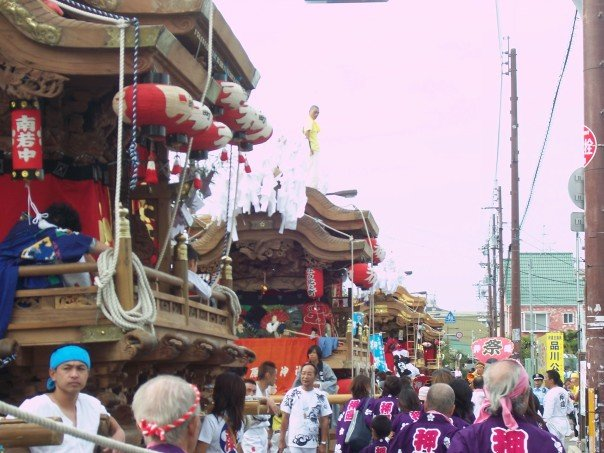

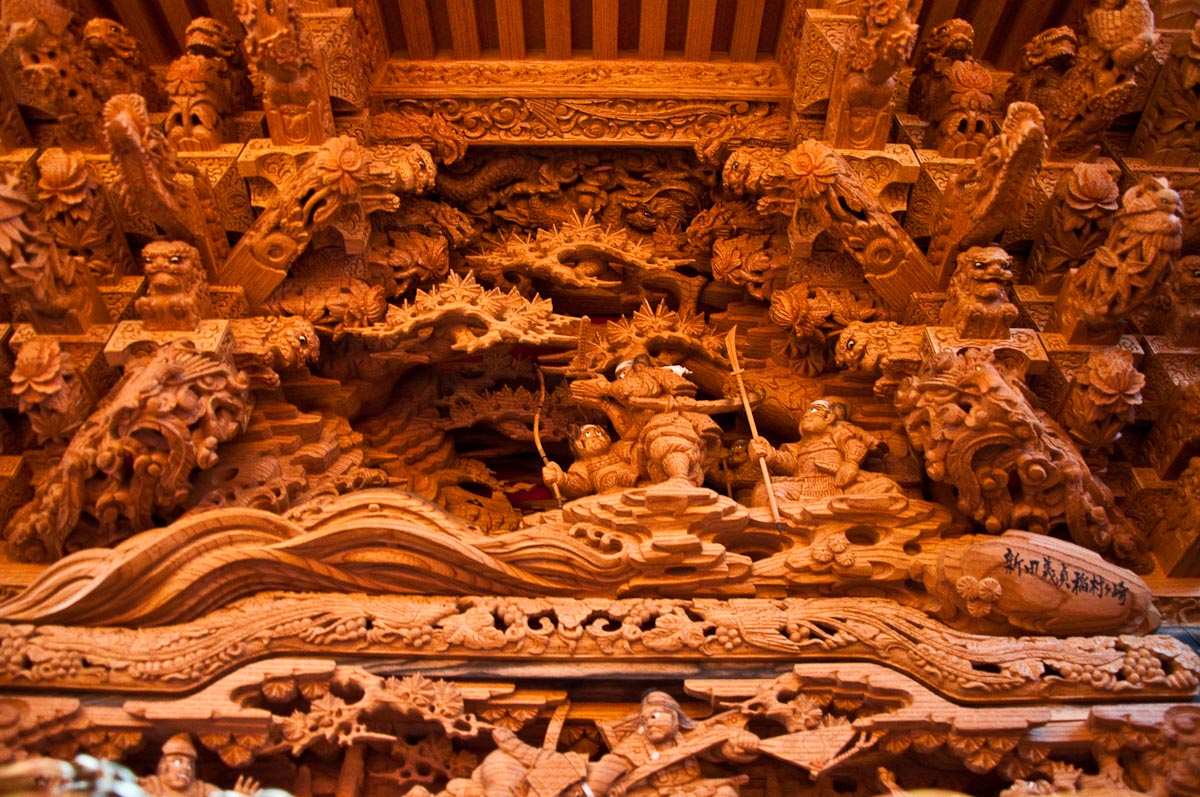
Wood carvings inside a Danjiri (at the 2009 Kishiwada Danjiri Matsuri)

== The danjiri cart ==
Danjiri are large wooden carts (danjiri guruma) in the shape of a shrine or temple. The carts, often being crafted out of wood, are very ornate, with elaborate carvings. Towns with danjiri festivals in them have different neighborhoods, each with their own guild responsible for maintaining their own danjiri cart. The cart is kept in storage for most of the year. As the festival approaches, the danjiri cart is prepared with elaborate flower arrangements, prayer cards, ornaments, and religious consecrations. They also make a special song every year. It is believed that spirits or gods reside in the danjiri. The person on the roof of the Danjiri cart controls the direction of movement and performs a traditional fan dance.

== Festival preparation ==
Town guild members spend a considerable amount of time to prepare for the festival. Meetings and consecrations are held at shrines days before the festival. The carts themselves must be readied for pulling, as they are stored partly disassembled in warehouses. The carts are consecrated for the big event, and they are decorated in various ways. For decorations, flags, prayer cards, fresh flower arrangements, and in some cases even lanterns are used. The taiko ("drum") and Kane ("bell") used to play the town danjiri rhythm are loaded onto the cart, and the musicians selected to ride the danjiri practice for months in advance. The ages of the selected musicians can vary from old veterans of the festival to children as young as four years of age.

== The festival ==
The days of the festival vary from year to year and from town to town, although it is usually held in autumn, in late September or October. On the day(s) of the festival, members of the town guilds pull their danjiri through the streets of the town, wearing their guild happi coat and head-band. The event is accompanied with the commotion of the participants pulling the cart, as they yell their kakegoe or signature shout, equivalent to the English "heave-ho!" Adding to the atmosphere is the danjiri rhythm played on drums and bells throughout the cart pulling, which can be heard from street blocks away. In towns with many guilds, the danjiri matsuri consists of various danjiri crisscrossing the streets at the same time. The festival usually ends in the danjiri gathering at an appointed place and having a religious ceremony.

== Variations ==
The way in which the festivals are celebrated vary from town to town. The danjiri carts can vary in size and decorative style. Some are large and tall, others are relatively small. In some towns, the danjiri are pulled slowly through the town until they get to their destination. In other towns, the danjiri are pulled as fast as the people can pull it. This results in a difficulty turning the cart at corners, sometimes resulting in the cart falling over and killing someone. It is said that at least one person dies in the danjiri festival of Kishiwada every year. It is common for danjiri to hit and damage buildings when they careen around a corner, and for this reason shop owners may buy Danjiri Insurance. The Kishiwada Danjiri Matsuri is probably the most famous Danjiri festival, with its fast danjiri and very animated guild leaders that ride up on top of the danjiri, hopping and dancing as the danjiri moves faster and faster. It attracts thousands of spectators every year.

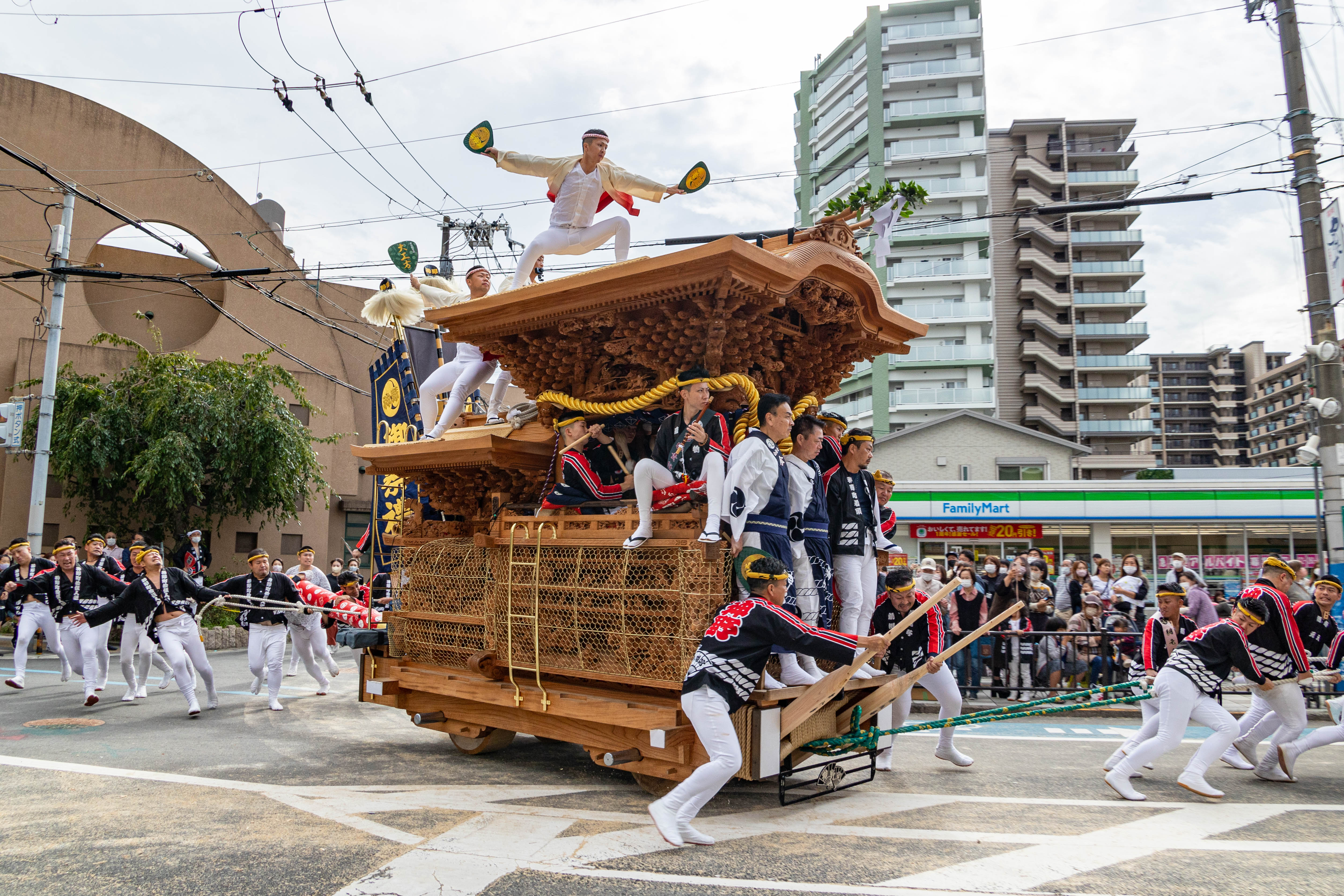

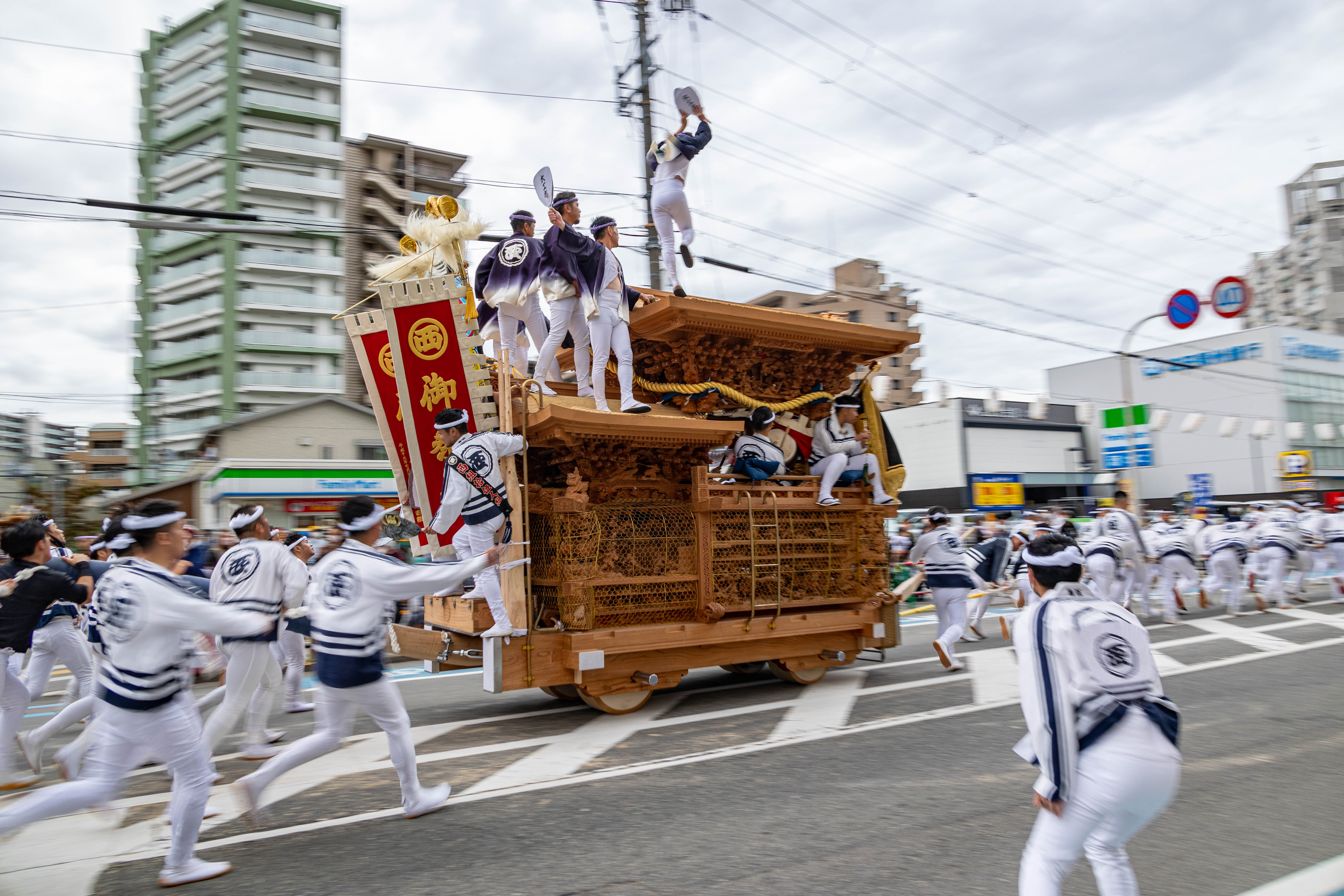

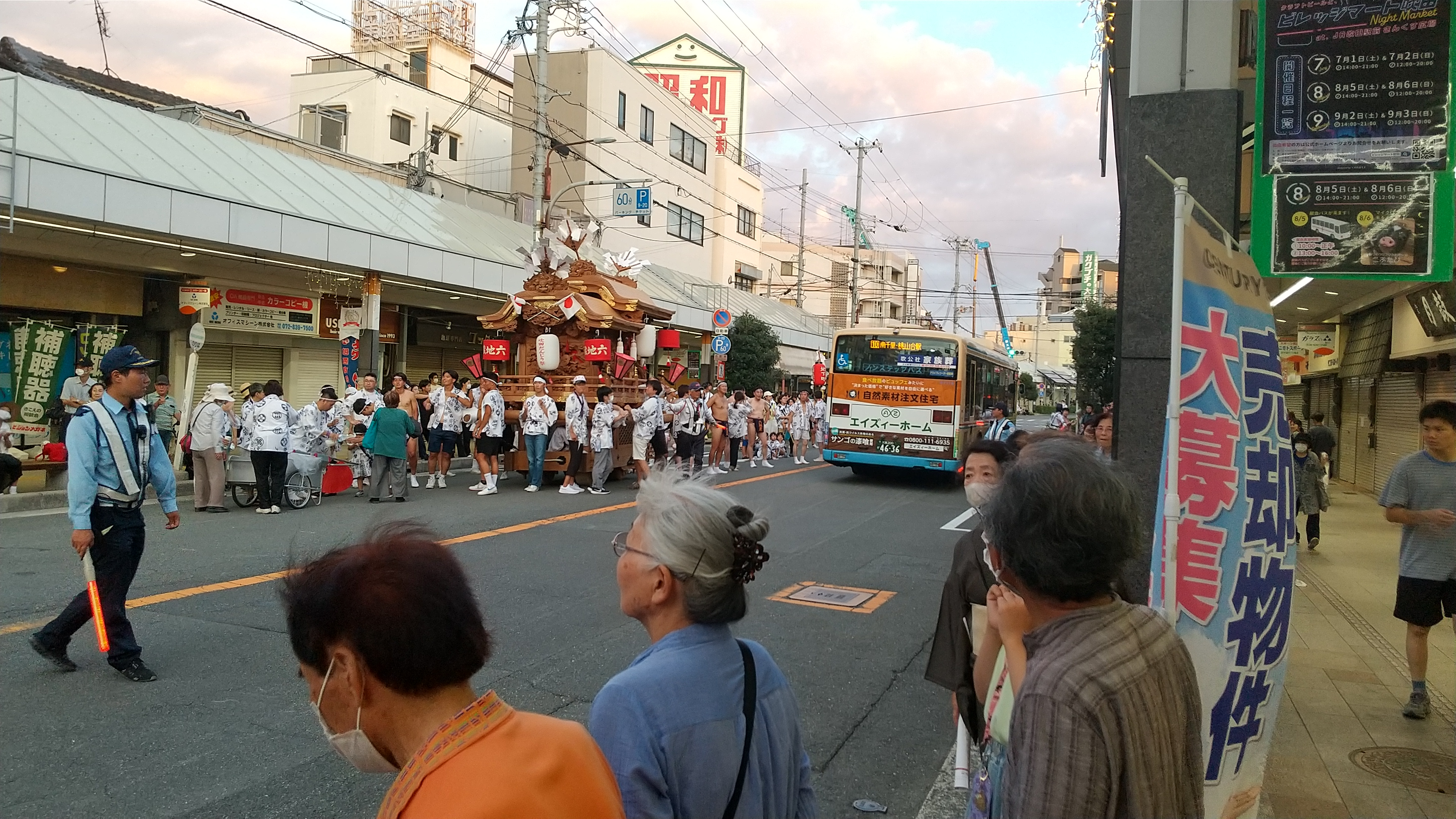
An example of small danjiri festival; Suita city (2023).

== Incidents and safety ==
Due to the heavy weight of the carts, the high speeds involved, and the tight urban spaces, the Danjiri Matsuri carries an inherent risk of accidents, injuries, and occasional fatalities.

The primary source of danger is the signature high-speed cornering performance known as yarimawashi. Because a danjiri cart typically weighs 3 to 4 metric tons and stands roughly 4 meters tall with a high center of gravity, pulling it around sharp street intersections without braking generates massive centrifugal force.

=== Notable Incidents ===
On October 10, 2026, a series of accidents occurred in the cities of Izumisano and Izumiotsu, Osaka Prefecture, where danjiri floats tipped over while making right turns at intersections during festival processions; a total of two people died, and 16 were injured.

== Gallery ==
Danjiri Matsuri at Ōtori taisya Shrine in Nishi-ku, Sakai, Osaka

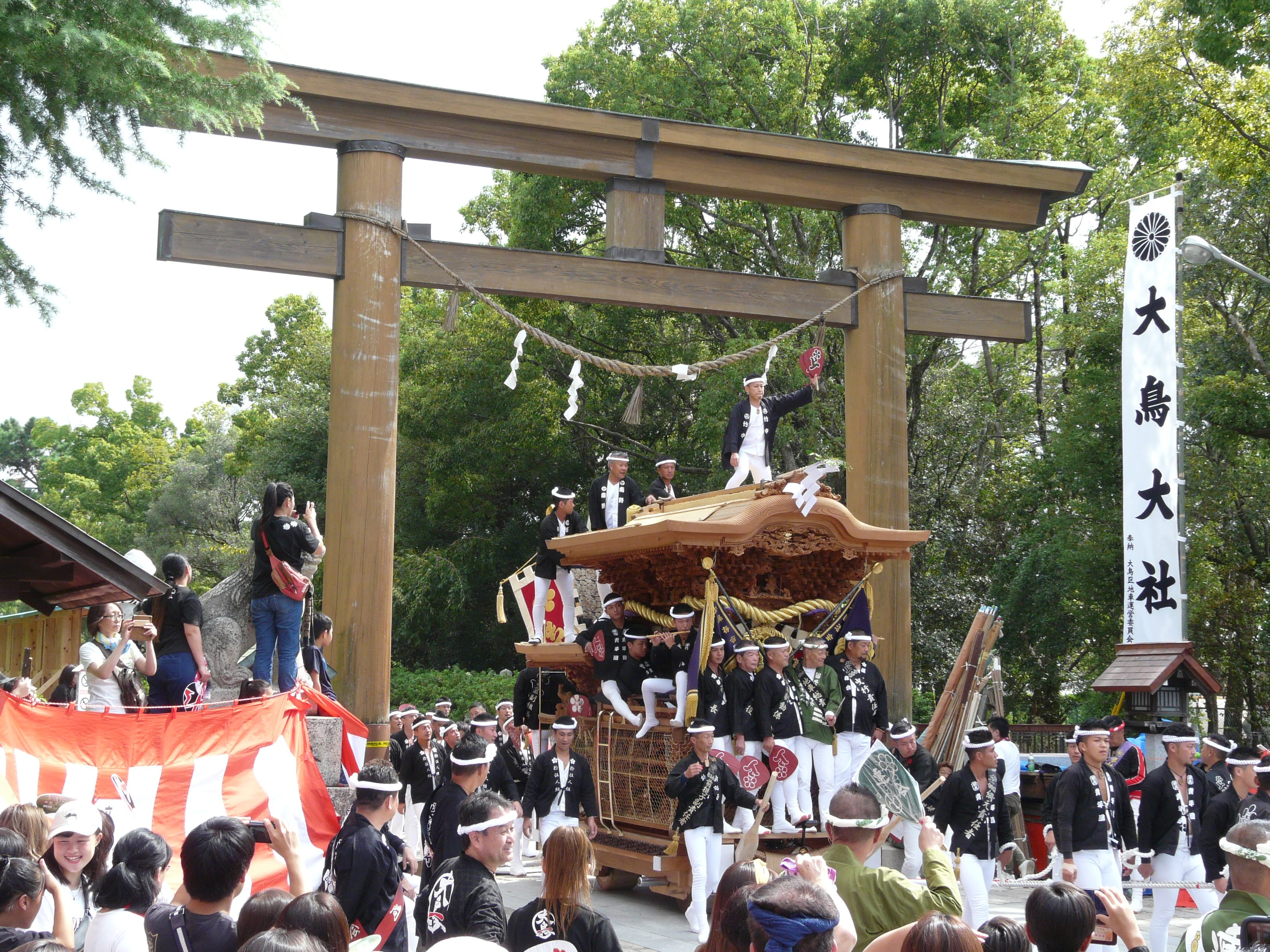

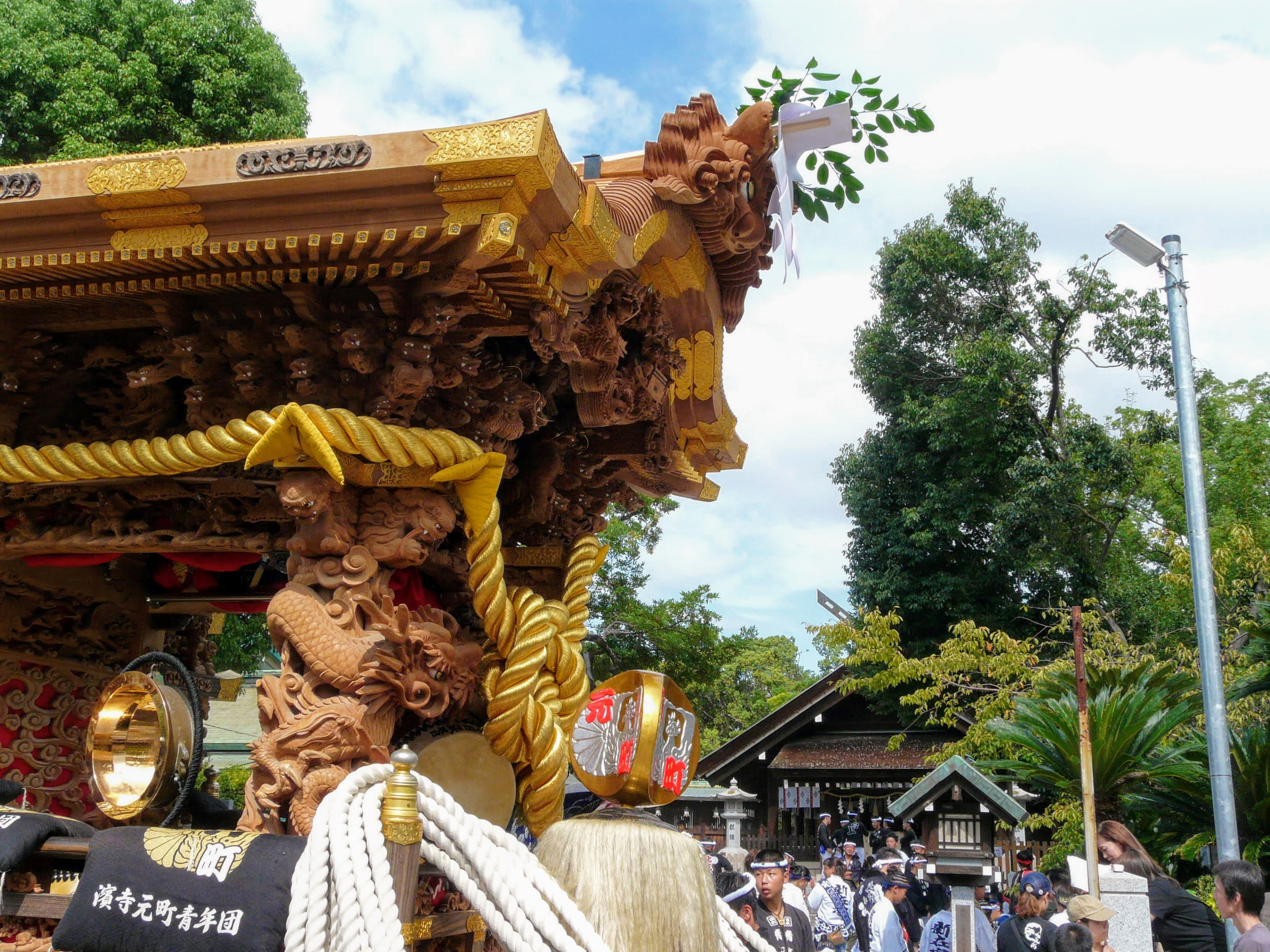

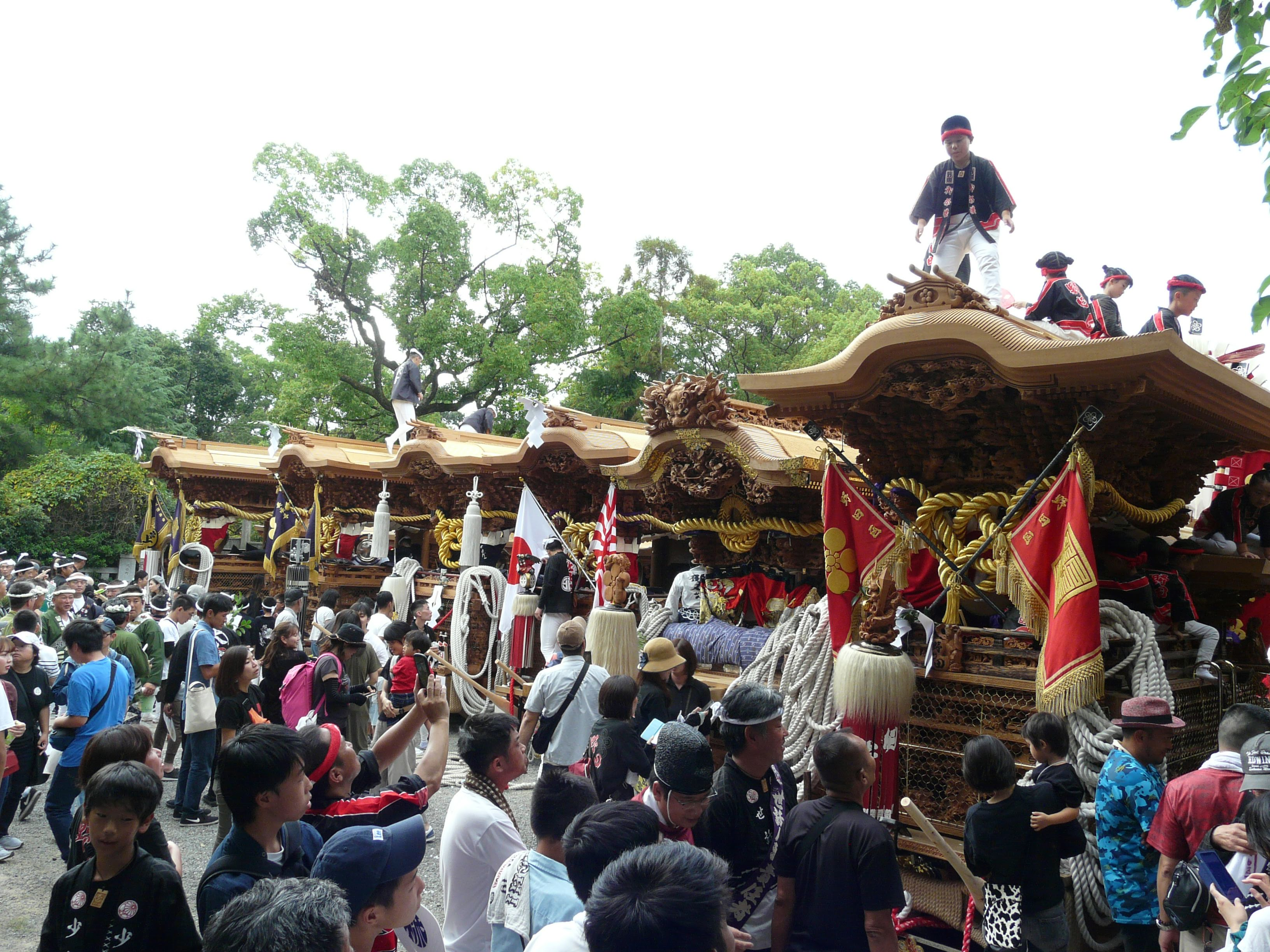

Danjiri Matsuri in Tsukuno area, Nishi-ku, Sakai, Osaka
