= 下松駅 =

下松駅 may refer to:

- Kudamatsu Station
- Shimomatsu Station
