= Mayuyama Kofun =

Kofun period burial mound in Kishiwada, Japan

- 摩湯山古墳 (Japanese)
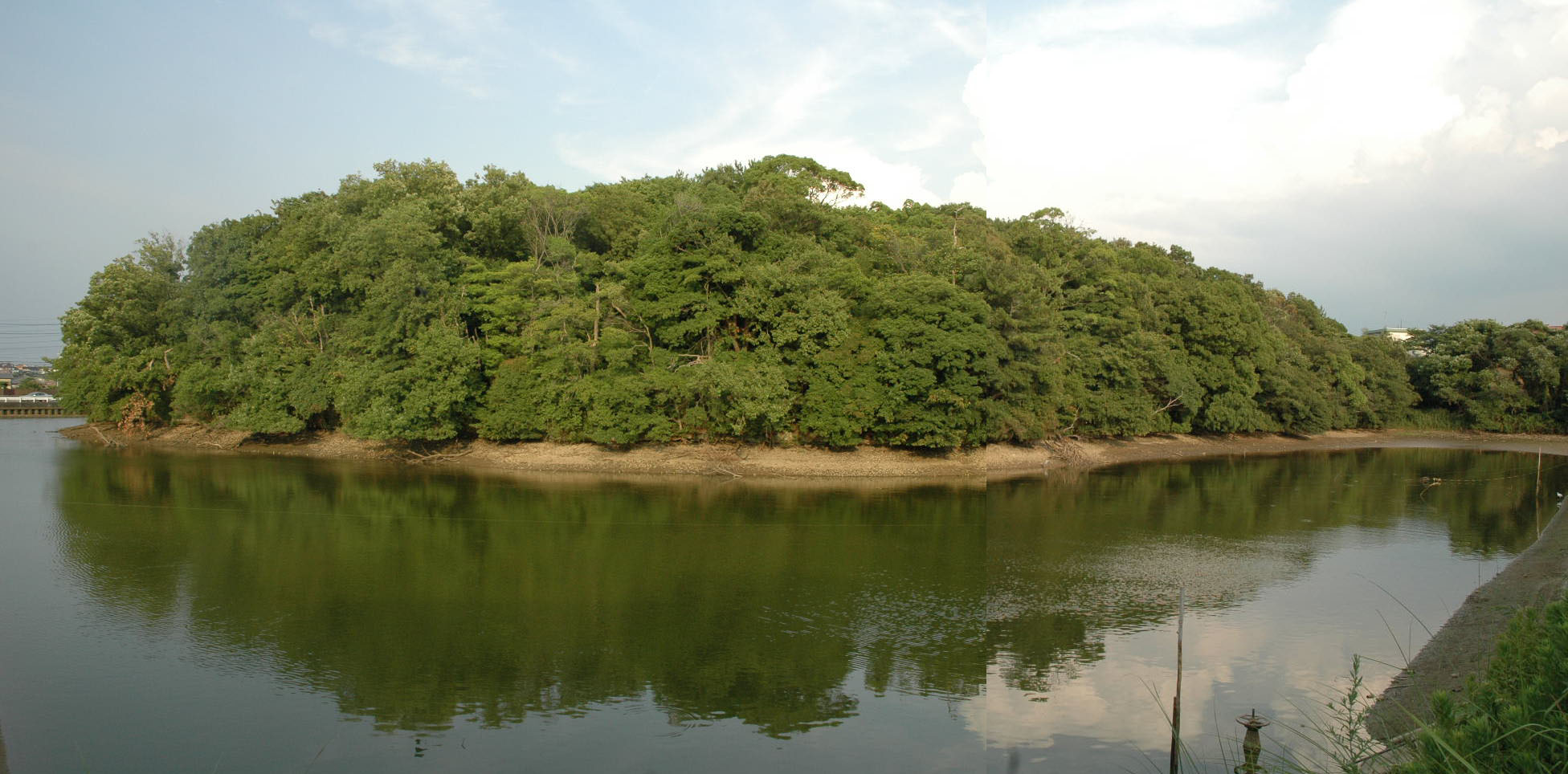
- Mayuyama Kofun

- Mayuyama Kofun Mayuyama Kofun (Japan)
- Interactive map of Mayuyama Kofun
- 34°27′44.7″N 135°26′0″E
- Type: Kofun
- Periods: Kofun period
- Location: Kishiwada, Osaka, Japan
- Region: Kansai region

History
- Built: 4th century

Site notes
- Public access: No

Mayuyama Kofun (摩湯山古墳) is a Kofun period keyhole-shaped burial mound, located in the Mayu neighborhood of the city of Kishiwada, Osaka in the Kansai region of Japan. The tumulus was designated a National Historic Site of Japan in 1956, with the area under protection expanded in 2010.

== Overview ==
The Mayuyama Kofun is a zenpō-kōen-fun (前方後円墳), which is shaped like a keyhole, having one square end and one circular end, when viewed from above. It is located on a hill overlooking the Ushitaki River, which flows out of the Izumi Mountains. It is orientated to the northwest, and has a length about 200 meters with a posterior rear circle diameter of about 130 meters, making it the largest in the Izumi region. The tumulus was originally covered in fukiishi and had a large number and variety of haniwa, including cylindrical, and "morning glory-shaped" variants. There were also a ceremonial platforms extending on both sides off of the constriction between the posterior and anterior portions. Traces of a moat remain around the posterior circular portion, but it is not certain if this moat was contemporary with the building of the tumulus, or was a later addition. Archaeological excavations have only been conducted around the periphery of the tumulus 1997 and 1998, and a full-scale survey has never been conducted, Consequently, details of the burial chamber are uncertain, but is it believed to have been a vertical pit-type structure which was robbed in antiquity judging from scattered fragments of schist and shards of Haji ware pottery which have been found on the surface of the posterior circular portion. From the construction details, haniwa, and pottery shards, it is estimated that the tumulus was built around the latter half of the 4th century. At present, access to the tumulus area is restricted.

In the vicinity of the Mayuyama Kofun are a number of ancillary tumuli. The Makozuka Kofun (馬子塚古墳) to the south and the Inariyama Kofun (稲荷山古墳) to the north survive, but numerous cylindrical haniwa excavated in the precincts of Awaji Shrine to the northeast indicate that the shrine may have been built on a now-vanished tumulus. The Makozuka Kofun is a square-type (hōfun (方墳)) measuring 35 meters on each side. It was largely flattened in 1958 during work to repair the moat embankment on the Mayuyama Kofun, during which time cylindrical haniwa were excavated. It estimated to have been built in the latter half of the 4th century (or the beginning of the 5th century).

The tumulus is about a twelve minutes by car from Kumeda Station on the JR West Hanwa Line.

Total length
200 meters:
Anterior rectangular portion
95 meters wide x 8 meters high, 3-tier
Posterior circular portion
127 meter diameter x 15 meters high, 3-tiers

== See also ==
- List of Historic Sites of Japan (Osaka)
