= Takojizō Station =

Railway station in Kishiwada, Osaka Prefecture, Japan

Takojizō Station 蛸地蔵駅
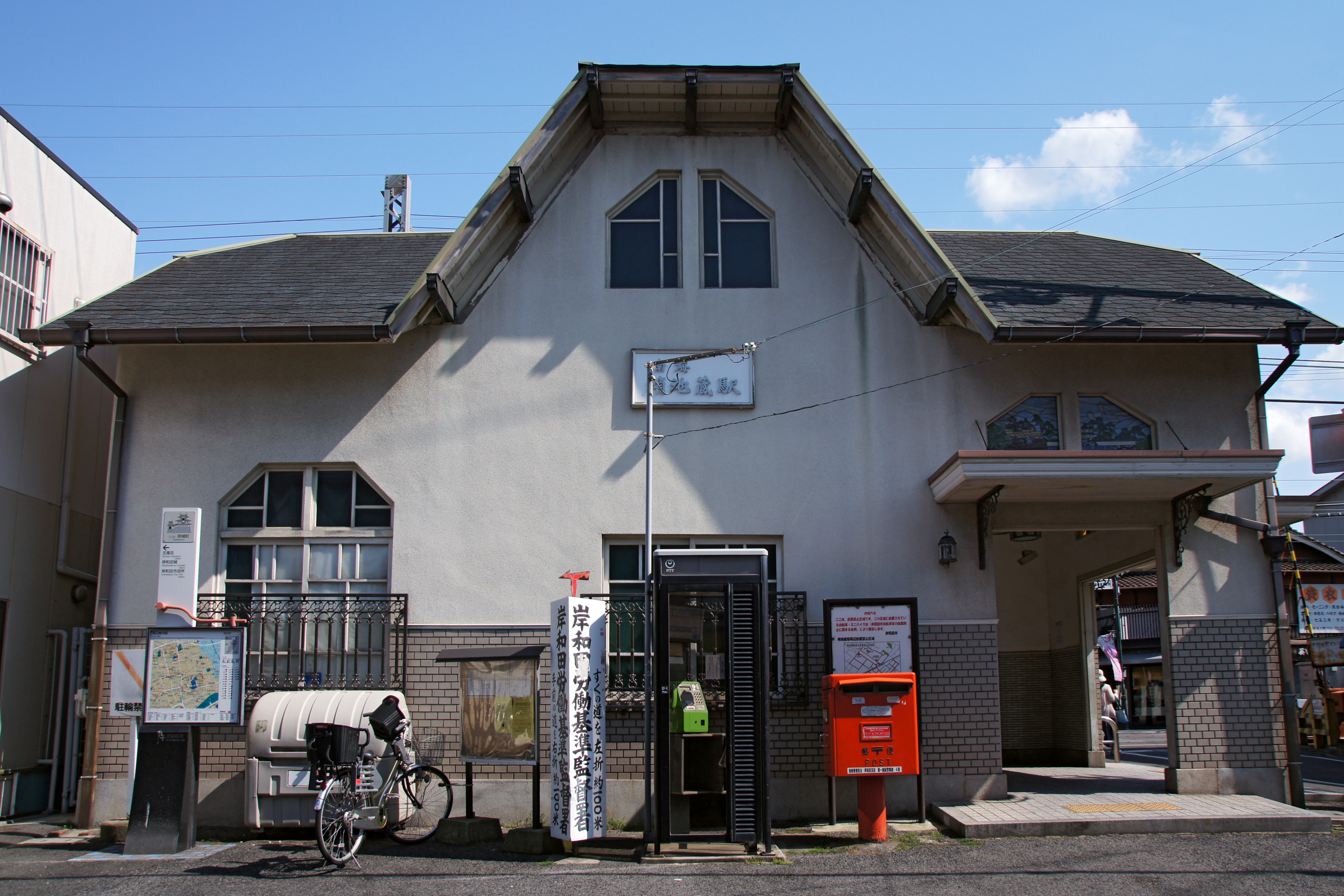
- Takojizō Station building in May 2012

General information
- Location: 16-1, Kishiki-cho, Kishiwada-shi, Osaka-fu 596-0073; Japan
- Coordinates: 34°27′23″N 135°22′11″E
- Operator: Nankai Electric Railway
- Line: Nankai Main Line
- Distance: 26.9 km from Namba
- Platforms: 2 side platforms

Other information
- Station code: NK25
- Website: Official website

History
- Opened: April 1914; 112 years ago

Passengers
- 2019: 4681 daily
Location
- Location within Osaka Prefecture Location within Japan

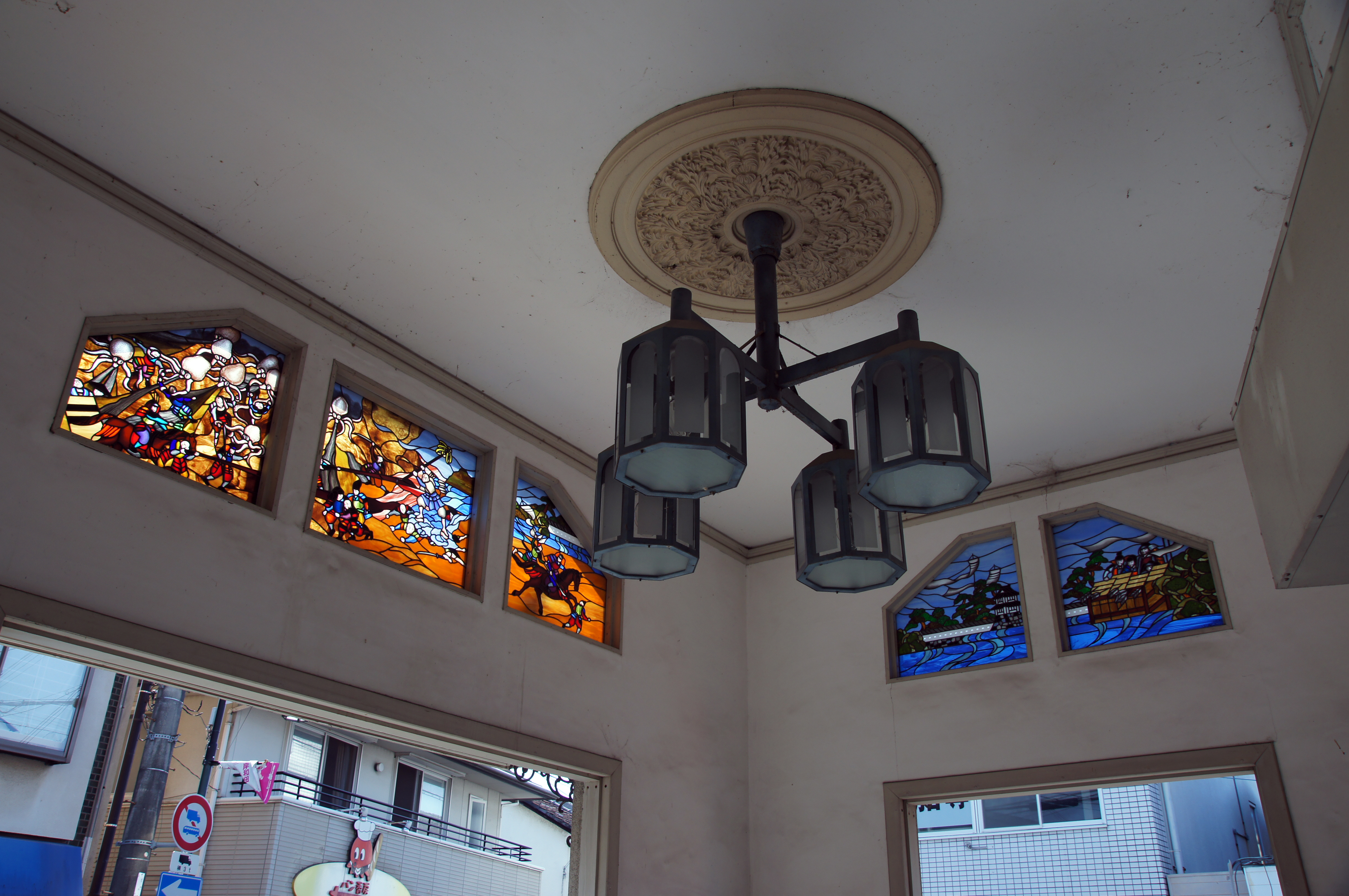
The entrance hall of Takojizō Station

Takojizō Station (蛸地蔵駅, Takojizō-eki) is a passenger railway station located in the city of Kishiwada, Osaka Prefecture, Japan, operated by the private railway operator Nankai Electric Railway. It has the station number "NK25".

== Lines ==
Takojizō Station is served by the Nankai Main Line, and is 26.9 kilometers (16.7 mi) from the terminus of the line at Nanba.

== Layout ==
The station consists of two opposed side platforms.The platforms are independent of one another, and passengers wishing to change platforms must exit and re-enter the station.

=== Platforms ===
1	■ Nankai Main Line	for Wakayamashi and Kansai Airport
2	■ Nankai Main Line	for Namba

== Adjacent stations ==
«	Service	»
Nankai Main Line
Limited Express "rapi:t α" for Kansai Airport (特急ラピートα): Does not stop at this station
Limited Express "rapi:t β" (特急ラピートβ): Does not stop at this station
Limited Express "Southern" (特急サザン): Does not stop at this station
Limited Express without seat reservations (自由席特急): Does not stop at this station
Express (急行): Does not stop at this station
Airport Express (空港急行): Does not stop at this station
Sub. Express (区間急行): Does not stop at this station
Kishiwada	Semi-Express for Namba (準急, in the morning on weekdays)	Kaizuka
Kishiwada	Local (普通車)	Kaizuka

== History ==
Takojizō Station opened on 1 April 1914.

== Passenger statistics ==
In fiscal 2019, the station was used by an average of 4681 passengers daily.

== Surrounding area ==
- Kishiwada Castle

== See also ==
- List of railway stations in Japan
