= Izumiōtsu Station =

Railway station in Izumiōtsu, Osaka Prefecture, Japan

Izumiōtsu Station 泉大津駅
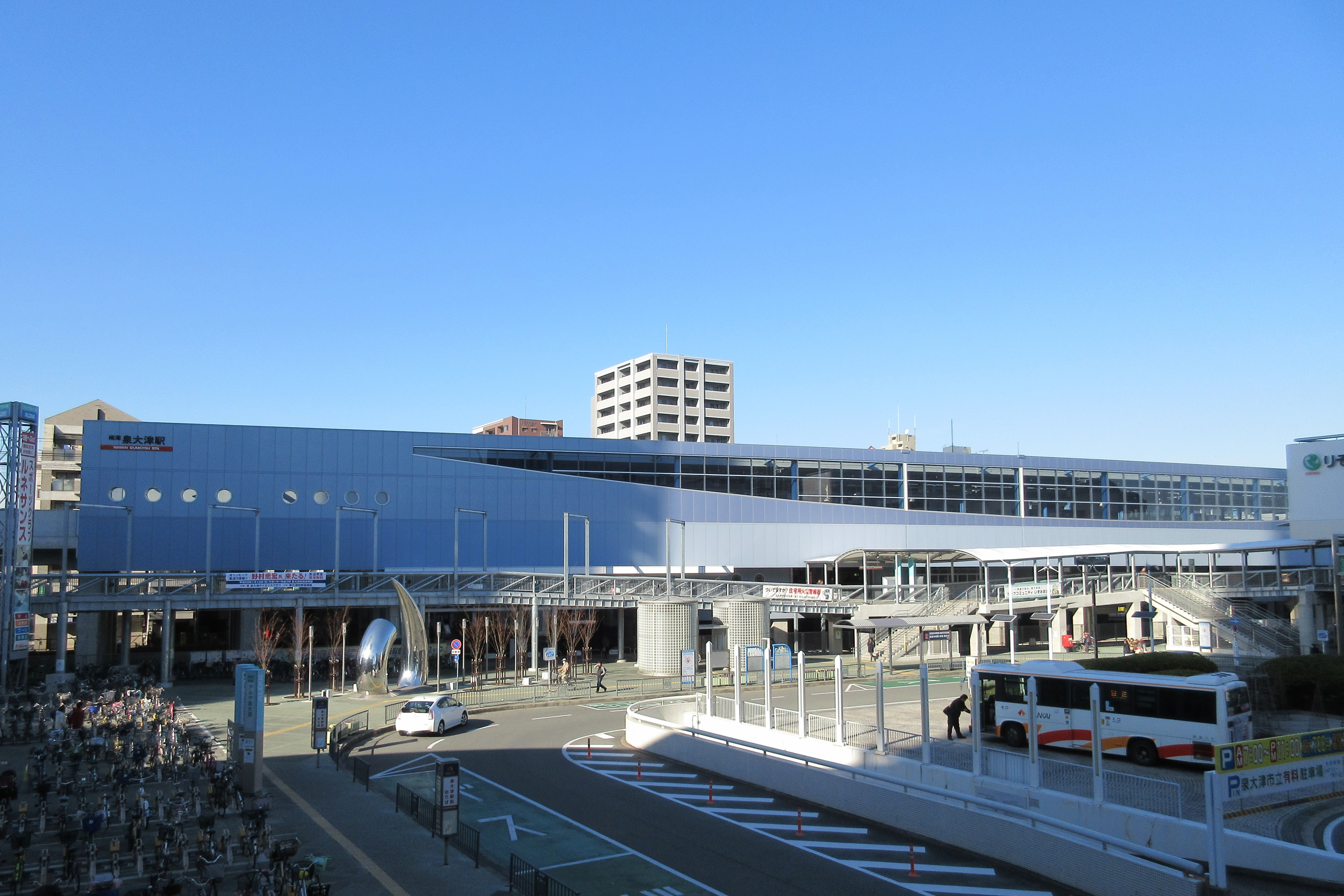
- Izumiōtsu Station in December 2015

General information
- Location: 19-1 Asahichō, Izumiōtsu-shi, Osaka-fu 595-0025; Japan
- Coordinates: 34°30′11″N 135°24′25″E
- Operator: Nankai Electric Railway
- Line: Nankai Main Line
- Distance: 20.4 km from Namba
- Platforms: 2 island platforms
- Connections: Bus terminal

Construction
- Structure type: Elevated

Other information
- Station code: NK20
- Website: Official website

History
- Opened: 1 October 1897; 128 years ago
- Rebuilt: August 2012; 14 years ago
- Former names: Ōtsu (until 1942)

Passengers
- 2019: 29,433 daily

Services
| Preceding station | Nankai Electric Railway | Following station |
|---|---|---|
| Matsunohama towards Namba | Nankai Main Line Local | Tadaoka towards Wakayamashi |
| Matsunohama towards Namba | Nankai Main Line Semi-Express | Tadaoka One-way operation |
| Hagoromo towards Namba | Nankai Main Line Sub. Express | Haruki towards Wakayamashi |
| Hagoromo towards Namba | Nankai Main Line Airport Express | Haruki towards Kansai Airport |
| Hagoromo towards Namba | Nankai Main Line Express | Kishiwada towards Wakayamashi |
Location
- Location within Osaka Prefecture Location within Japan

Izumiōtsu Station (泉大津駅, Izumiōtsu) is a passenger railway station located in the city of Izumiōtsu, Osaka Prefecture, Japan, operated by the private railway operator Nankai Electric Railway. It has the station number "NK20".

== Lines ==
Izumiōtsu Station is served by the Nankai Main Line, and is 20.4 kilometers (12.7 mi) from the terminus of the line at Namba.

== Layout ==
The station consists of two elevated island platforms with the station building underneath.

=== Platforms ===
| 1, 2 | ■ Nankai Main Line | for Wakayamashi and Kansai Airport |
| 3, 4 | ■ Nankai Main Line | for Namba |

== History ==
The station opened on 1 October 1897, named Ōtsu Station (大津駅). It was renamed Izumiōtsu Station on 1 July 1942. The station was rebuilt as an elevated station, completed on 4 August 2012.

== Passenger statistics ==
In fiscal 2019, the station was used by an average of 29,433 passengers daily.

== Surrounding area ==
- Izumiotsu City Hall

== See also ==
- List of railway stations in Japan
