= Higashi-Kishiwada Station =

Railway station in Kishiwada, Osaka Prefecture, Japan

Higashi-Kishiwada Station 東岸和田駅
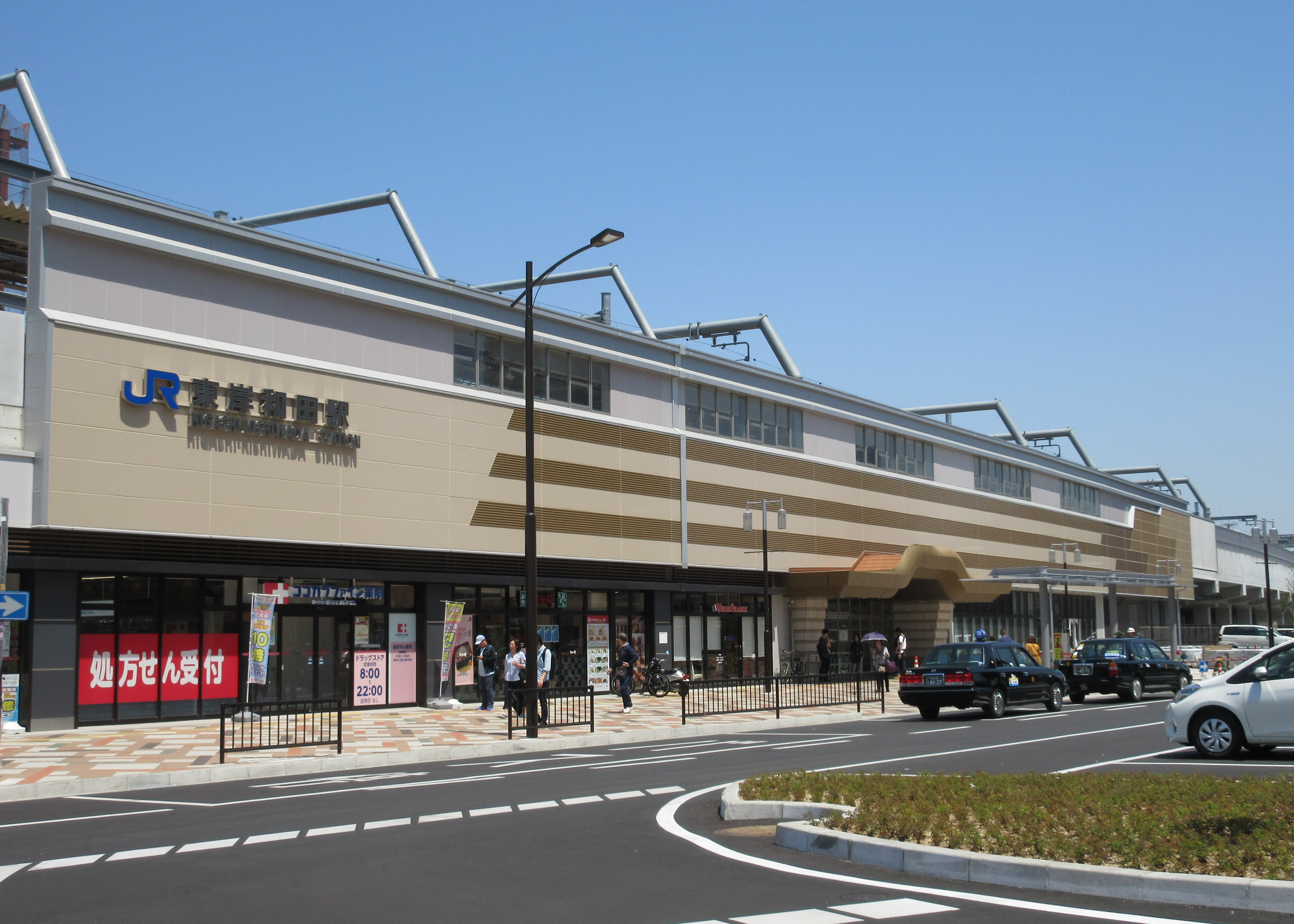
- Higashi-Kishiwada Station East exit, May 2019

General information
- Location: 2072, Habu-cho, Kishiwada-shi, Osaka-fu 596-0825; Japan
- Coordinates: 34°26′58″N 135°23′09″E
- Owner: West Japan Railway Company
- Operator: West Japan Railway Company
- Line: R Hanwa Line
- Distance: 26.5 km (16.5 miles) from Tennōji
- Platforms: 2 island platforms
- Tracks: 2
- Train operators: West Japan Railway Company

Other information
- Status: Staffed (Midori no Madoguchi )
- Station code: JR-R40
- Website: Official website

History
- Opened: 16 June 1930
- Former names: Habugō (to 1932), Hanwa-Kishiwada (to 1941)

Passengers
- FY2019: 11,322 daily
Services
Preceding station	JR-West	Following station
Hanwa Line
Limited Express Kuroshio: Does not stop at this station
Limited Express Haruka: Does not stop at this station
Shimomatsu	Local	Higashi-Kaizuka
Shimomatsu	Regional Rapid Service	Higashi-Kaizuka
Izumi-Fuchū	Direct Rapid Service	Kumatori
Izumi-Fuchū	Rapid Service	Kumatori
Izumi-Fuchū	Kansai Airport Rapid Service; Kishuji Rapid Service	Kumatori
|}
Location
- Location within Osaka Prefecture Location within Japan

Higashi-Kishiwada Station (東岸和田駅, Higashi-Kishiwada-eki) is a passenger railway station in located in the city of Kishiwada, Osaka Prefecture, Japan, operated by West Japan Railway Company (JR West).

== Lines ==
Higashi-Kishiwada Station is served by the Hanwa Line, and is located 26.5 km (16.5 mi) from the northern terminus of the line at Tennōji.

== Station layout ==
The station consists of two elevated island platforms with the station building underneath. The station has a Midori no Madoguchi staffed ticket office.

=== Platforms ===
1, 2	■ R Hanwa Line	for Kansai Airport and Wakayama
3, 4	■ R Hanwa Line	for Tennōji

== History ==
Higashi-Kishiwada Station opened on 16 June 1930 as Habugō Station (土生郷駅). It was renamed Hanwa-Kishiwada Station (阪和岸和田駅) on 1 April 1932, and to its present name on 1 August 1941. With the privatization of the Japan National Railways (JNR) on 1 April 1987, the station came under the aegis of the West Japan Railway Company.

Station numbering was introduced in March 2018 with Higashi-Kishiwada being assigned station number JR-R40.

== Passenger statistics ==
In fiscal 2019, the station was used by an average of 11,322 passengers daily (boarding passengers only).

== Surrounding area ==
- Katsuragi Hospital
- Osaka Prefectural Izumi High School
- Osaka Prefectural Kishiwada Support School
- Osaka Technical College
- Kishiwada City Habu Junior High School
- Senko-ji Temple

== See also ==
- List of railway stations in Japan
