= Kishiwada Station =

Railway station in Kishiwada, Osaka Prefecture, Japan

Kishiwada Station 岸和田駅
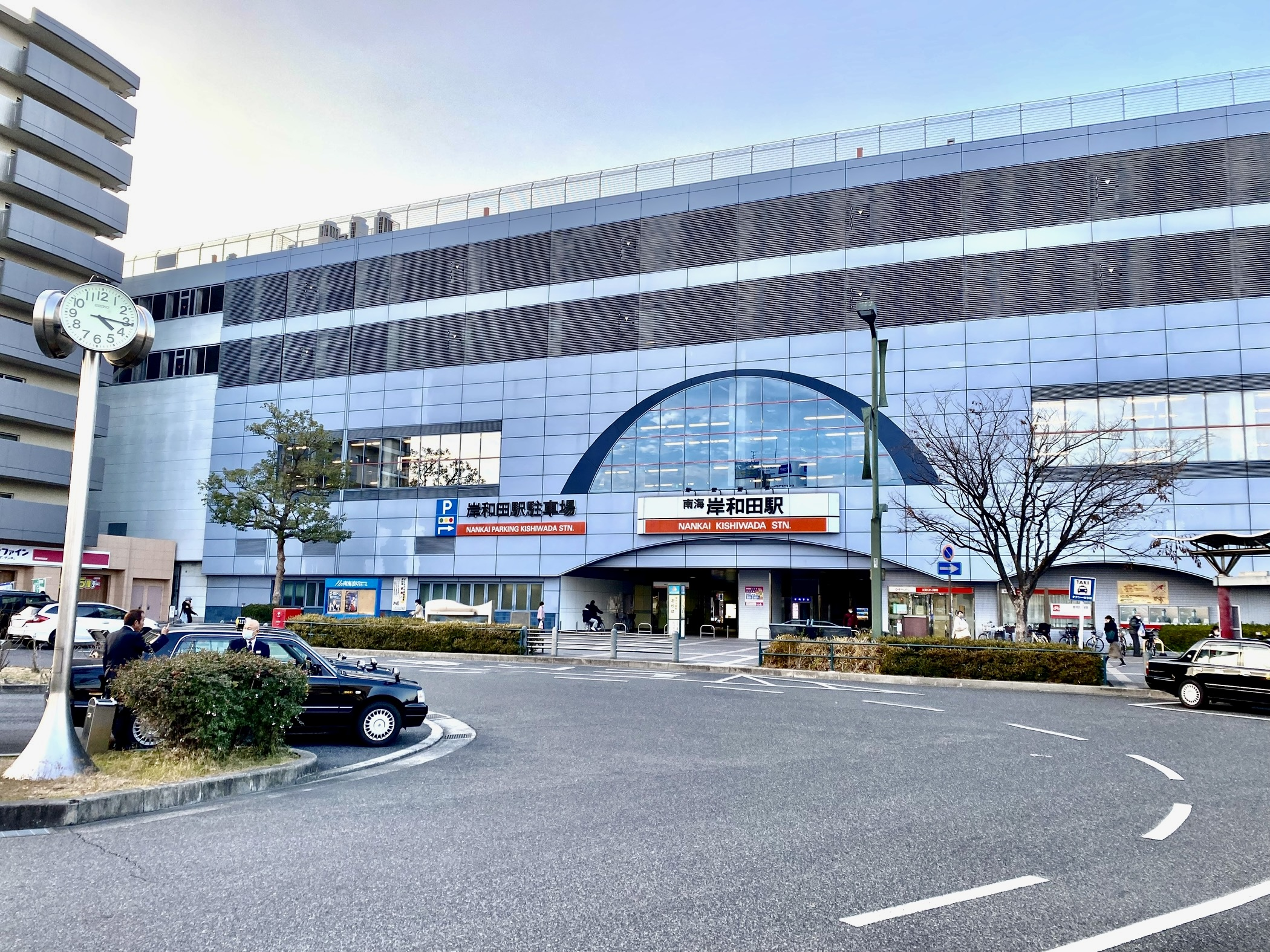
- Kishiwada Station in December 2021

General information
- Location: 1-10, Miyamoto-cho, Kishiwada-shi, Osaka-fu 596-0054; Japan
- Coordinates: 34°27′37″N 135°22′41″E
- Operator: Nankai Electric Railway
- Line: Nankai Main Line
- Distance: 26.0 km from Namba
- Platforms: 2 island platforms
- Connections: Bus terminal

Construction
- Structure type: Elevated
- Parking: Yes

Other information
- Station code: NK24
- Website: Official website

History
- Opened: 1 October 1897; 128 years ago

Passengers
- 2019: 12,577 daily

Services
Preceding station	Nankai Electric Railway	Following station
Izumi-Ōmiya towards Namba	Nankai Main Line Local	Takojizō towards Wakayamashi
Izumi-Ōmiya towards Namba	Nankai Main Line Semi-Express	Takojizō One-way operation
Haruki towards Namba	Nankai Main Line Sub. Express	Kaizuka towards Wakayamashi
Haruki towards Namba	Nankai Main Line Airport Express	Kaizuka towards Kansai Airport
Izumiōtsu towards Namba	Nankai Main Line Express	Kaizuka towards Wakayamashi
Sakai towards Namba	Southern	Izumisano towards Wakayamashi or Wakayamakō
Sakai towards Namba	Rapi:t β	Izumisano towards Kansai Airport
Location
- Location within Osaka Prefecture Location within Japan

Kishiwada Station (岸和田駅, Kishiwada-eki) is a passenger railway station located in the city of Kishiwada, Osaka Prefecture, Japan, operated by the private railway operator Nankai Electric Railway. It has the station number "NK24".

== Lines ==
Kishiwada Station is served by the Nankai Main Line, and is 26.0 kilometers (16.2 mi) from the terminus of the line at Namba.

== Layout ==
The station consists of two elevated island platforms with the station building underneath.

=== Platforms ===
1, 2	■ Nankai Main Line	for Wakayamashi and Kansai Airport
3,4	■ Nankai Main Line	for Namba

== History ==
Kishiwada Station opened on 1 October 1897.

== Passenger statistics ==
In fiscal 2019, the station was used by an average of 12,577 passengers daily.

== Surrounding area ==
- Kishiwada City Hall
- Osaka Prefectural Kishiwada High School
- Osaka Prefectural Izumi High School
- Kishiwada City Industrial High School

== See also ==
- List of railway stations in Japan
