= Higashi-Kaizuka Station =

Railway station in Kaizuka, Osaka Prefecture, Japan

Higashi-Kaizuka Station 東貝塚駅
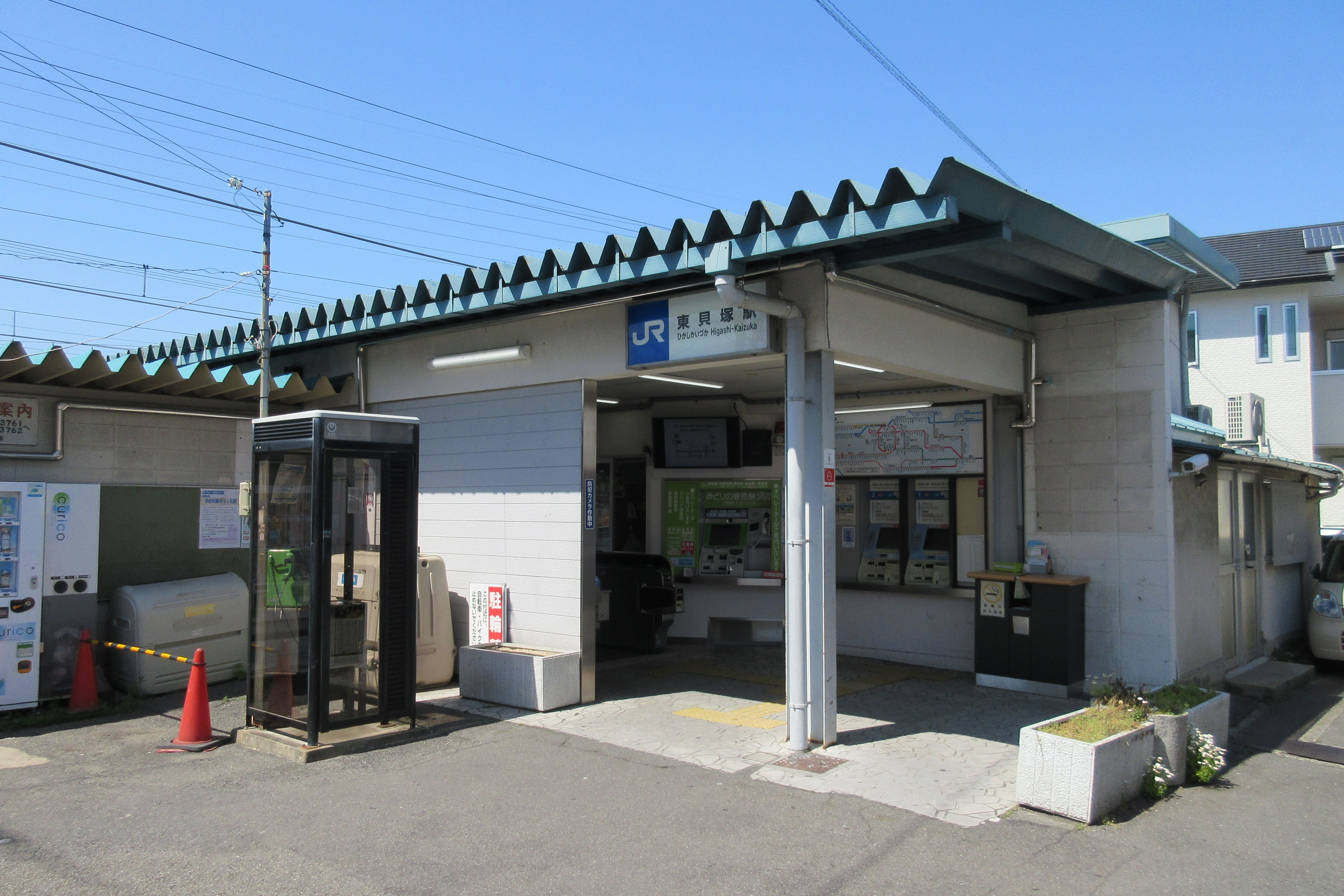
- Higashi-Kaizuka Station, May 2019

General information
- Location: 1-1-1, Handa, Kaizuka-shi, Osaka-fu; Japan
- Coordinates: 34.4403°N 135.3724°E
- System: JR-West commuter rail station
- Owner: West Japan Railway Company
- Operator: West Japan Railway Company
- Line: R Hanwa Line
- Distance: 28.1 km (17.5 miles) from Tennōji
- Platforms: 2 island platforms
- Tracks: 2
- Train operators: West Japan Railway Company

Construction
- Structure type: At grade

Other information
- Status: Staffed
- Station code: JR-R41
- Website: Official website

History
- Opened: 24 September 1934
- Former names: Hanwa-Kaizuka (to 1941)

Passengers
- FY2019: 2525 daily
Services
Preceding station	JR-West	Following station
Hanwa Line
Higashi-Kishiwada	Local	Izumi-Hashimoto
Higashi-Kishiwada	Regional Rapid Service	Izumi-Hashimoto
Direct Rapid Service: Does not stop at this station
Rapid Service: Does not stop at this station
Kansai Airport Rapid Service: Does not stop at this station
Kishuji Rapid Service: Does not stop at this station
Limited Express Kuroshio: Does not stop at this station
Limited Express Haruka: Does not stop at this station
|}
Location
- Location within Osaka Prefecture Location within Japan

Higashi-Kaizuka Station (東貝塚駅, Higashi-Kaizuka-eki) is a passenger railway station in located in the city of Kaizuka, Osaka Prefecture, Japan, operated by West Japan Railway Company (JR West).

== Lines ==
Higashi-Kaizuka Station is served by the Hanwa Line, and is located 28.1 kilometres (17.5 miles) from the northern terminus of the line at Tennōji.

== Station layout ==
The station consists of two island platforms connected to the station building by an underground passage. The station is staffed.

=== Platforms ===
1, 2	■ R Hanwa Line	for Kansai Airport and Wakayama
3, 4	■ R Hanwa Line	for Tennōji

== History ==
Higashi-Kaizuka Station opened on 24 September 1934 as Hanwa-Kaizuka Station (阪和貝塚駅). It was renamed to its present name on 1 August 1941. With the privatization of the Japan National Railways (JNR) on 1 April 1987, the station came under the aegis of the West Japan Railway Company.

Station numbering was introduced in March 2018 with Higashi-Kaizuka being assigned station number JR-R41.

== Passenger statistics ==
In fiscal 2019, the station was used by an average of 2525 passengers daily (boarding passengers only).

== Surrounding area ==
- Japan Life Baseball Club Ground
- Kaizuka City History Exhibition Hall (former Unitika Phoenix Factory Office)
- Kaizuka Municipal Second Junior High School

== See also ==
- List of railway stations in Japan
