= Yutaka Ooe =

Japanese enka singer (born 1989)

Yutaka Ooe 大江 裕
- Born: November 16, 1989 (age 36); Kishiwada, Osaka, Japan
- Genres: Enka
- Occupation: Enka singer
- Instruments: Singing
- Years active: 2009–10; 2012–
- Label: Nippon Crown
- Website: Kitajima Music Office profile; Nippon Crown website

Yutaka Ooe (大江 裕, Ōe Yutaka; born 16 November 1989, in Kishiwada, Osaka, Japan) is a Japanese enka singer.

Ooe is represented with Kitajima Music Office.

== Filmography ==
=== TV series ===
Year	Title	Network	Notes	Ref.
2007	Sanma's Karakuri-TV.	TBS		
2009	NHK Kayō Concert	NHK-G		
2009	Seyanen!	MBS		
2009	Waratte Iitomo!	Fuji TV		
2009	Prime H	NHK-G	Guest with Shōji Koganezawa	
2009	NHK Nodo Jiman	NHK-G		
2009	Monomane Kōhaku Uta Gassen	Fuji TV		
2009	Tokyo Friend Park 2	TBS		
2010	Himitsu no Kenmin Show	YTV		
2012	Sanma's Karakuri-TV.	TBS		
2014	Bukkomi Japāzu – Dai Kōhyō Dai 3-dan – Bakushō Sekai no Nisejapan o Dokkiri Taiji	TBS		
2016	Shin BS Nihon no Uta	NHK-BS Premium	Broadcast on November 13, recorded at Toki, Gifu.	
2016	54th Kayō Charity Concert	NHK-G (Tokyo area)	Recorded at Shizuoka, Shizuoka.	

=== Advertisements ===
Title	Notes
Suntory Intelligentsia	Cast with Yūta Hiraoka

== Discography ==
=== Singles ===
Year	Title	notes
2009	"Noroma Taishō / Nanka Itchō yattaro kai"	CRCN-1397, February 15, 2009; CRCN-1433 (CD with DVD), September 2, 2009.
2010	"Yūyake Taishō / Shinjitsu kono Michi Harukanari"	CRCN-1453, January 11, 2010.
2010	"Nippon Dōchū Itadakimasu / Gokigen Song"	CRCN-1484, July 21, 2010.
2012	"Furusato wa Ima… / Ima Shibashi"	CRCN-1612, March 28, 2012.
2012	"Otoko no Tabi... / Soshite Ashita ni"	CRCN-1647, September 26, 2012.
2013	"Mikan no Furusato / Nipponrettō Tazune Tabi"	CRCN-1698, May 8, 2013.
2014	"Kitakaze Taishō (single version) / Seishun no Tsubasa"	CRCN-1763, January 8, 2014.
2014	"Kokoro Gawari / Onna no Hagure-uta"	CRCN-1818, September 3, 2014.
2015	"Onna no Uso / Onna no Hanamichi"	CRCN-1876, May 27, 2015.
2015	"Takoyaki Biyori: Meotoyatai (Yutaka Ooe & Hiromi Yamaguchi) / Onna no Nokoribi"	CRCN-1919, December 2, 2015.
2016	"Kokoroame / Danjiri Sodachi"	CRCN-1947, March 9, 2016.
2016	"Gomen nasu tte"	CD (CRCN-1997) and cassette tape (CRSN-1997), October 26, 2016.

=== Albums ===
Year	Title	notes
2010	Enka Taishō Yutaka Ooe: Nipponrettō Uta Hikyaku I	CRCN-20364, April 7, 2010.
2012	Yutaka Ooe: The Best	CRCN-20375, August 8, 2012.
2014	Yutaka Ooe Best: Kitakaze Taishō, Noroma Taishō	CRCN-41189, November 5, 2014.
2015	Yutaka Ooe Zenkyoku-shū: Kokoro Gawari, Noroma Taishō	CRCN-41219, November 5, 2015.
2016	Josei Kayō Meikyoku-sen	CRCN-20422, May 7, 2016.
2016	Yutaka Ooe Zenkyoku-shū: Kokoroame, Noroma Taishō	CRCN-41247, November 2, 2016.
