= Izumi-Hashimoto Station =

Railway station in Kaizuka, Osaka Prefecture, Japan

Izumi-Hashimoto Station 和泉橋本駅
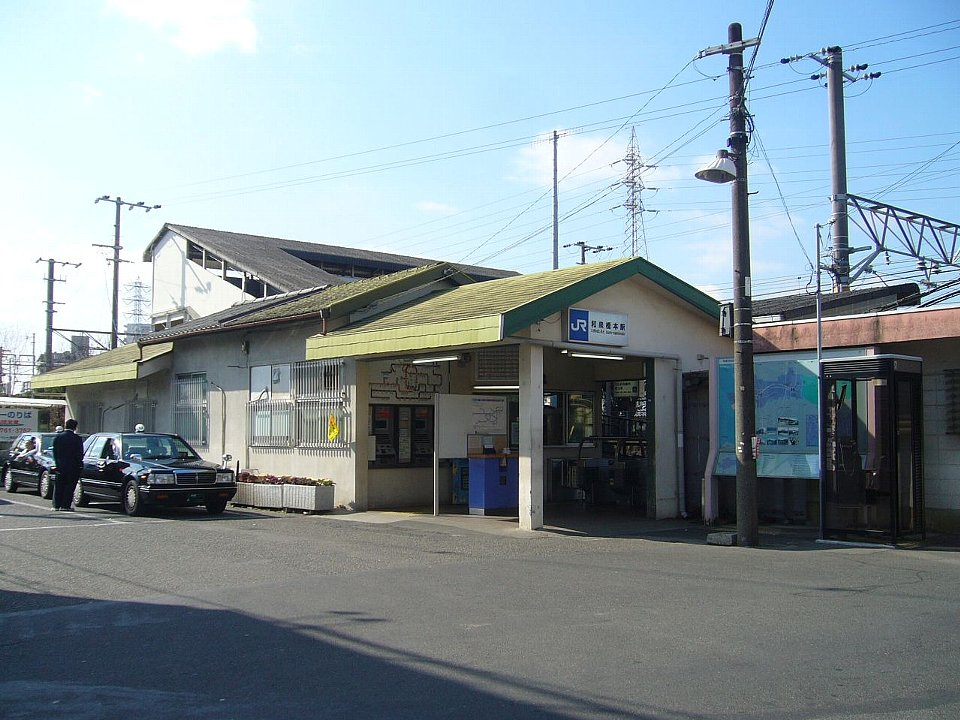
- Izumi-Hashimoto Station, January 2007

General information
- Location: 33 Hashimoto, Kaizuka-shi, Osaka-fu 597-0043; Japan
- Coordinates: 34.4275°N 135.3590°E
- System: JR-West commuter rail station
- Owner: West Japan Railway Company
- Operator: West Japan Railway Company
- Line: R Hanwa Line
- Distance: 30.0 km (18.6 miles) from Tennōji
- Platforms: 2 side platforms
- Tracks: 2
- Train operators: West Japan Railway Company

Construction
- Structure type: At grade

Other information
- Status: Staffed
- Station code: JR-R42
- Website: Official website

History
- Opened: 16 June 1930

Passengers
- FY2019: 3212 daily
Services
Preceding station	JR-West	Following station
Hanwa Line
Higashi-Kaizuka	Local	Higashi-Sano
Higashi-Kaizuka	Regional Rapid Service	Higashi-Sano
Direct Rapid Service: Does not stop at this station
Rapid Service: Does not stop at this station
Kansai Airport Rapid Service: Does not stop at this station
Kishuji Rapid Service: Does not stop at this station
Limited Express Kuroshio: Does not stop at this station
Limited Express Haruka: Does not stop at this station
|}
Location
- Location within Osaka Prefecture Location within Japan

Izumi-Hashimoto Station (和泉橋本駅, Izumi-Hashimoto-eki) is a passenger railway station in located in the city of Kaizuka, Osaka Prefecture, Japan, operated by West Japan Railway Company (JR West).

== Lines ==
Izumi-Hashimoto Station is served by the Hanwa Line, and is located 30.0 kilometres (18.6 miles) from the northern terminus of the line at Tennōji.

== Station layout ==
The station consists of two opposed side platforms connected to the station building by a footbridge. The station is staffed.

=== Platforms ===
1	■ R Hanwa Line	for Kansai Airport and Wakayama
2	■ R Hanwa Line	for Tennōji

== History ==
Izumi-Hashimoto Station opened on 16 June 1930. With the privatization of the Japan National Railways (JNR) on 1 April 1987, the station came under the aegis of the West Japan Railway Company.

Station numbering was introduced in March 2018 with Izumi-Hashimoto being assigned station number JR-R42.

== Passenger statistics ==
In fiscal 2019, the station was used by an average of 3212 passengers daily (boarding passengers only).

== Surrounding area ==
- Aeon Kaizuka store
- Osaka Prefectural Road No. 30 Osaka Izumi Sennan Line

== See also ==
- List of railway stations in Japan
