= Kishiwada Danjiri Matsuri =

Danjiri Matsuri festival in Japan

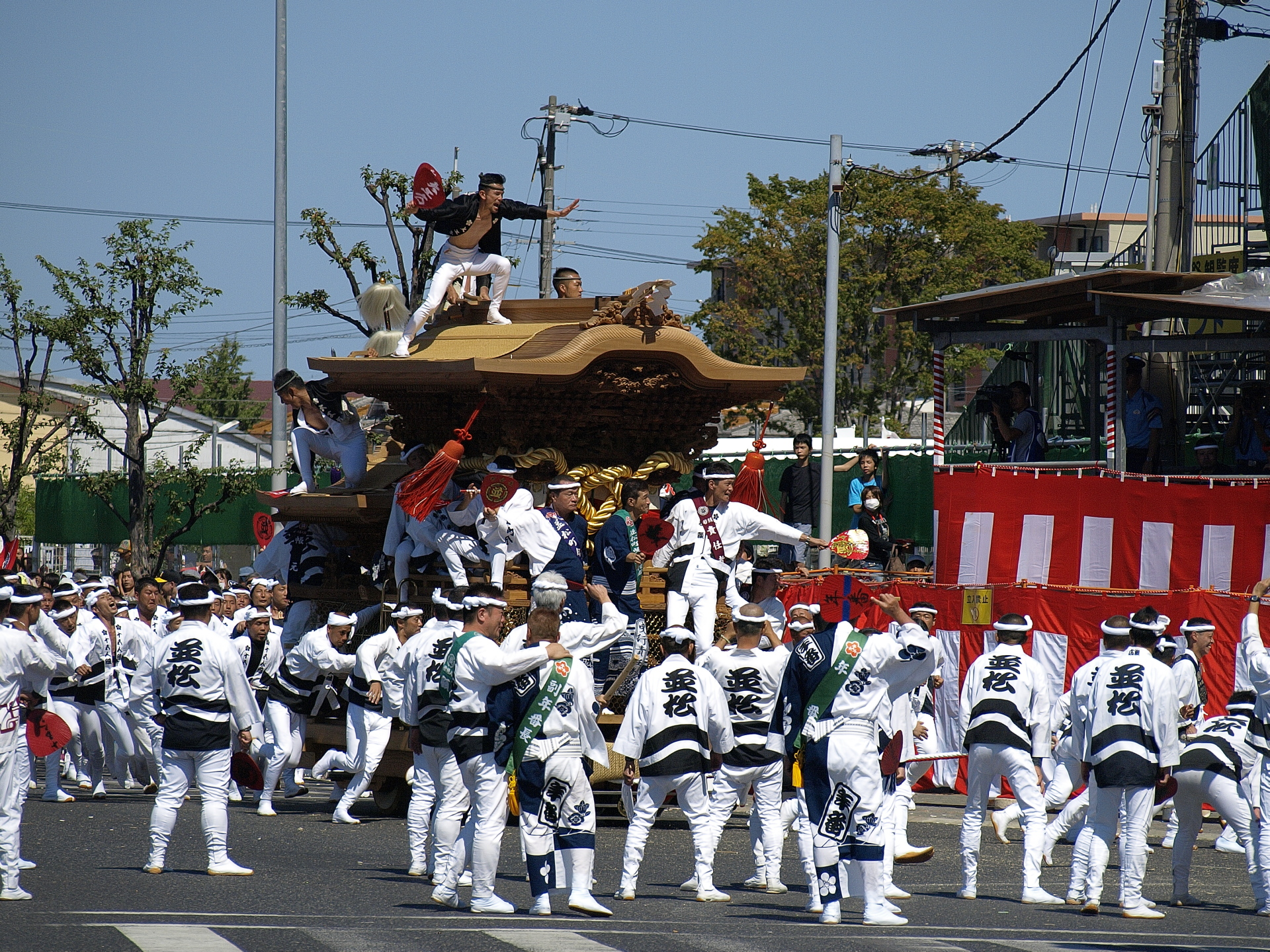
- Kishiwada Danjiri Matsuri in 2009
- Observed by: Kishiwada, Osaka
- Type: Religious
- Date: Saturday and Sunday before Respect for the Aged Day
- Related to: Fukagawa Matsuri, Sannō Matsuri

The Kishiwada Danjiri Matsuri (岸和田だんじり祭), held in Kishiwada, Osaka, is one of the most famous Danjiri Matsuri festivals in Japan. The festival is a parade involving large wooden shrine floats that are pulled at a high speed by a large team of men. During the dangerous runs, several men are standing on top of the shrine float.

== History ==
The festival began in 1703 when the daimyō of Kishiwada, Okabe Nagayasu (岡部 長泰), prayed for an abundant harvest to Shinto divinity Inari, the rice goddess of Fushimi Inari-taisha, Kyoto. He opened the doors of the Kishiwada Castle to the population for the festival.

== Summary ==
The Danjiri festival is divided principally into two festivals. The first is held in September and is the more famous of the two. The second occurs in October, is less famous but involves more Danjiri. The September Festival is itself divided in two. Again, the more famous is the Kishiwada danjiri centering on the Castle and runs from the Nankai line down to the seaside. The other Danjiri festival occurs in Haruki Town and centres on Nankai Haruki Station. The September Festival involves 34 Danjiri. In October the towns between the Nankai line and the mountains hold their own Danjiri Festivals. These involve 47 Danjiri and centre on the JR stations of Kumeda, Shimomatsu and Higashi-Kishiwada.

The city has 81 large wooden carts, each holding a portable shrine or danjiri.

== Schedule ==
Since 2006, Kishiwada Danjiri Matsuri has been held on the Saturday and Sunday before Respect for the Aged Day.

== Personal roles ==
- Sponsor (世話人 sewanin)
- "Young head" (若頭 waka gashira)
- Pulling team (組 kumi)
- Cartwright (大工方 daiku gata)
- "Young man group" (青年團 seinen dan): usually 16–25-year-old people who play musical instruments such as the taiko (drum) and Kane (bell).
