= Haruki Station =

Railway station in Kishiwada, Osaka Prefecture, Japan

Haruki Station 春木駅
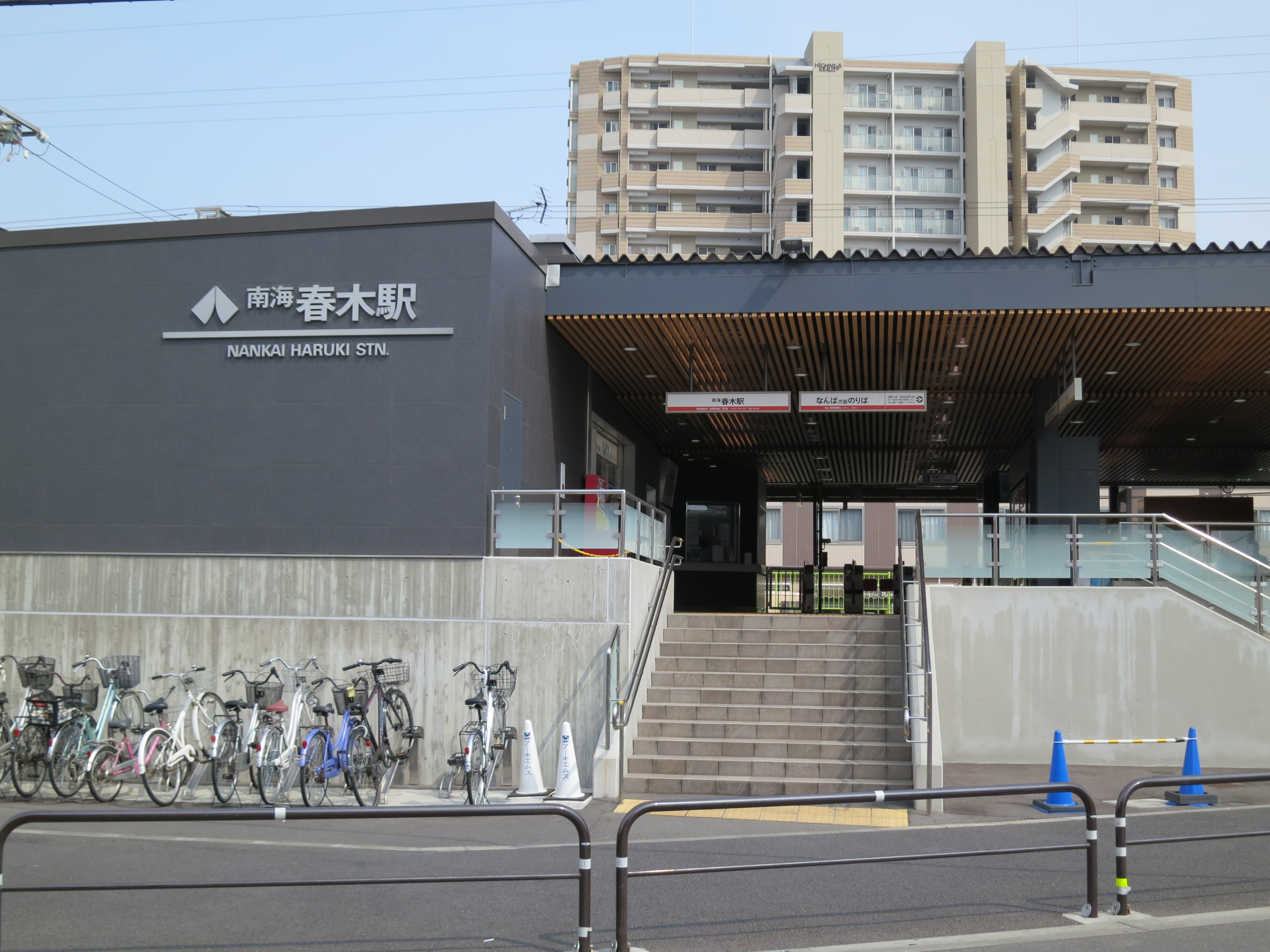
- Haruki Station, April 2019

General information
- Location: 14-6, Harukiwakamatsu-cho, Kishiwada-shi, Osaka-fu 596-0006; Japan
- Coordinates: 34°28′38″N 135°23′30″E
- Operator: Nankai Electric Railway
- Line: Nankai Main Line
- Distance: 23.7 km from Namba
- Platforms: 1 island + 1 side platform

Other information
- Station code: NK22
- Website: Official website

History
- Opened: 18 October 1914; 111 years ago

Passengers
- 2019: 14,736 daily
Location
- Location within Osaka Prefecture Location within Japan

Haruki Station (春木駅, Haruki-eki) is a passenger railway station located in the city of Kishiwada, Osaka Prefecture, Japan, operated by the private railway operator Nankai Electric Railway. It has the station number "NK22".

== Lines ==
Haruki Station is served by the Nankai Main Line, and is 23.7 kilometers (14.7 mi) from the terminus of the line at Nanba.

== Layout ==
The station consists of one island platform and one side platform.The platforms are independent of one another, and passengers wishing to change platforms must exit and re-enter the station. There are two tracks for maintenance in the west of track 3. On the days of large cycle racing at Kishiwada Cycle Racing Track, extra express trains run from this station to Namba.

=== Platforms ===
1	■ Nankai Main Line	for Wakayamashi and Kansai Airport
2	■ Nankai Main Line	for Namba
3	■ Nankai Main Line	for Namba (Terminating track)

== Adjacent stations ==
«	Service	»
Nankai Main Line
Tadaoka	Local (普通車)	Izumi-Ōmiya
Tadaoka	Semi-Express (only running for Namba in the morning on weekdays)	Izumi-Ōmiya
Izumiōtsu	Sub. Express	Kishiwada
Izumiōtsu	Airport Express	Kishiwada
Izumiōtsu	Extra Express (-急行-) (on the days of cycle racing)	Terminus
Express (急行): Does not stop at this station
Limited Express (including "Rapi:t" and "Southern"): Does not stop at this station

== History ==
Haruki Station opened on 18 October 1914.

== Passenger statistics ==
In fiscal 2019, the station was used by an average of 14,736 passengers daily.

== Surrounding area ==
- Kishiwada Cycle Racing Track
- Kishiwada Medical Center
- Madoka Hall, Central Park, Kishiwada Gymnasium
- Osaka District Court Kishiwada Branch, Osaka District Court Kishiwada Branch, Kishiwada Summary Court

== See also ==
- List of railway stations in Japan
