= Izumi-Ōmiya Station =

Railway station in Kishiwada, Osaka Prefecture, Japan

Izumi-Ōmiya Station 和泉大宮駅
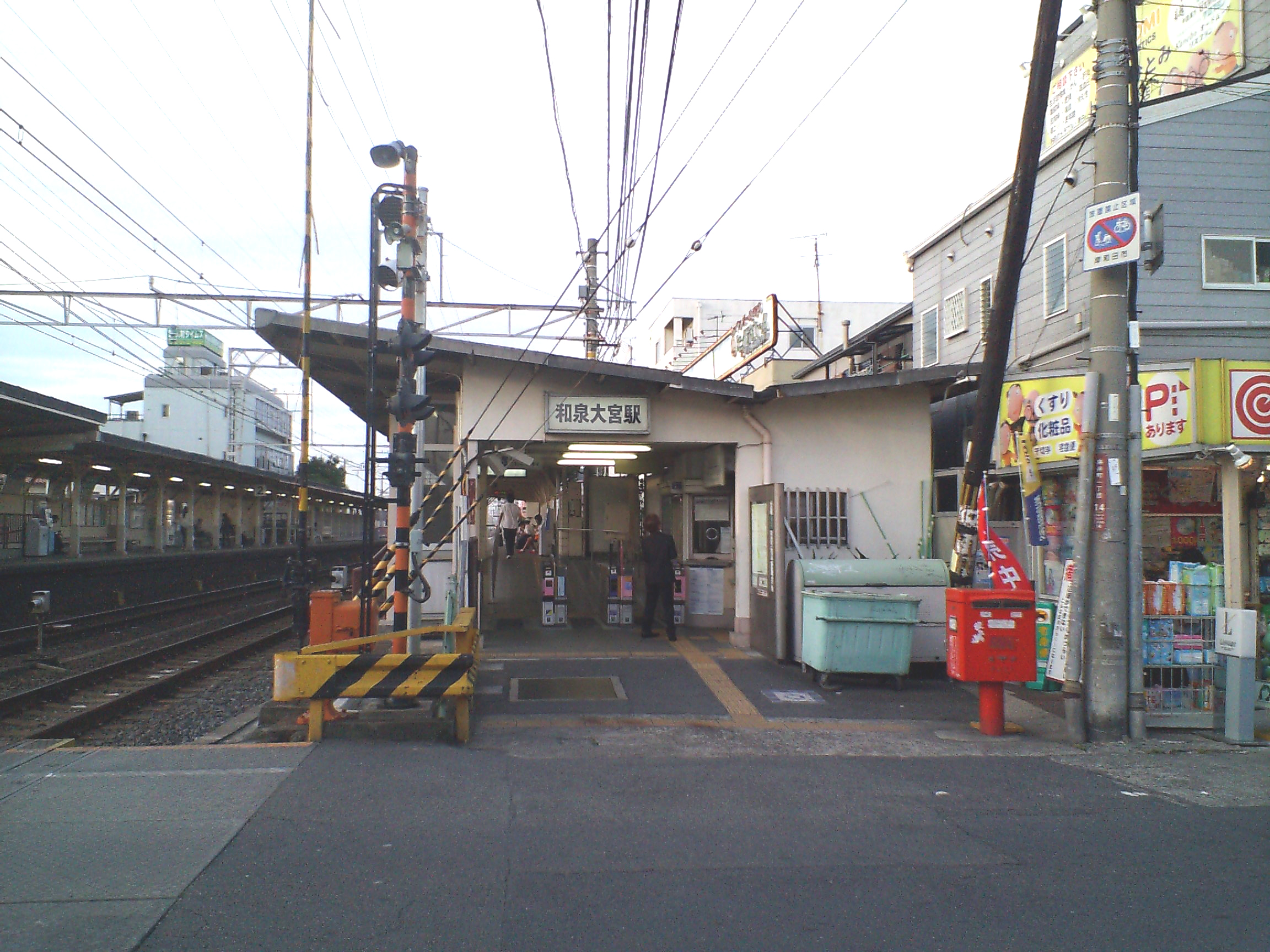
- Izumi-Ōmiya Station, June 2007

General information
- Location: 13-1, Kamino-cho Higashi, Kishiwada-shi, Osaka-fu 596-0047; Japan
- Coordinates: 34°28′03″N 135°23′04″E
- Operator: Nankai Electric Railway
- Line: Nankai Main Line
- Distance: 25.0 km from Namba
- Platforms: 2 side platforms

Other information
- Station code: NK23
- Website: Official website

History
- Opened: 10 April 1937; 89 years ago

Passengers
- 2019: 4852 daily
Location
- Location within Osaka Prefecture Location within Japan

Izumi-Ōmiya Station (和泉大宮駅, Izumi-Ōmiya-eki) is a passenger railway station located in the city of Kishiwada, Osaka Prefecture, Japan, operated by the private railway operator Nankai Electric Railway. It has the station number "NK23".

== Lines ==
Izumi-Ōmiya Station is served by the Nankai Main Line, and is 25.0 kilometers (15.5 mi) from the terminus of the line at Nanba.

== Layout ==
The station consists of two opposed side platforms.The platforms are independent of one another, and passengers wishing to change platforms must exit and re-enter the station.

=== Platforms ===
1	■ Nankai Main Line	for Wakayamashi and Kansai Airport
2	■ Nankai Main Line	for Namba

== Adjacent stations ==
«	Service	»
Nankai Main Line
Limited Express "rapi:t α" for Kansai Airport (特急ラピートα): Does not stop at this station
Limited Express "rapi:t β" (特急ラピートβ): Does not stop at this station
Limited Express "Southern" (特急サザン): Does not stop at this station
Limited Express without seat reservations (自由席特急): Does not stop at this station
Express (急行): Does not stop at this station
Airport Express (空港急行): Does not stop at this station
Sub. Express (区間急行): Does not stop at this station
Haruki	Semi-Express for Namba (準急, in the morning on weekdays)	Kishiwada
Haruki	Local (普通車)	Kishiwada

== History ==
Izumi-Ōmiya Station opened on 10 April 1937.

== Passenger statistics ==
In fiscal 2019, the station was used by an average of 4852 passengers daily.

== Surrounding area ==
- Hyozu Jinja (Izumi-Ōmiya)

== See also ==
- List of railway stations in Japan
