= Tadaoka Station =

Railway station in Tadaoka, Osaka Prefecture, Japan

Tadaoka Station 忠岡駅
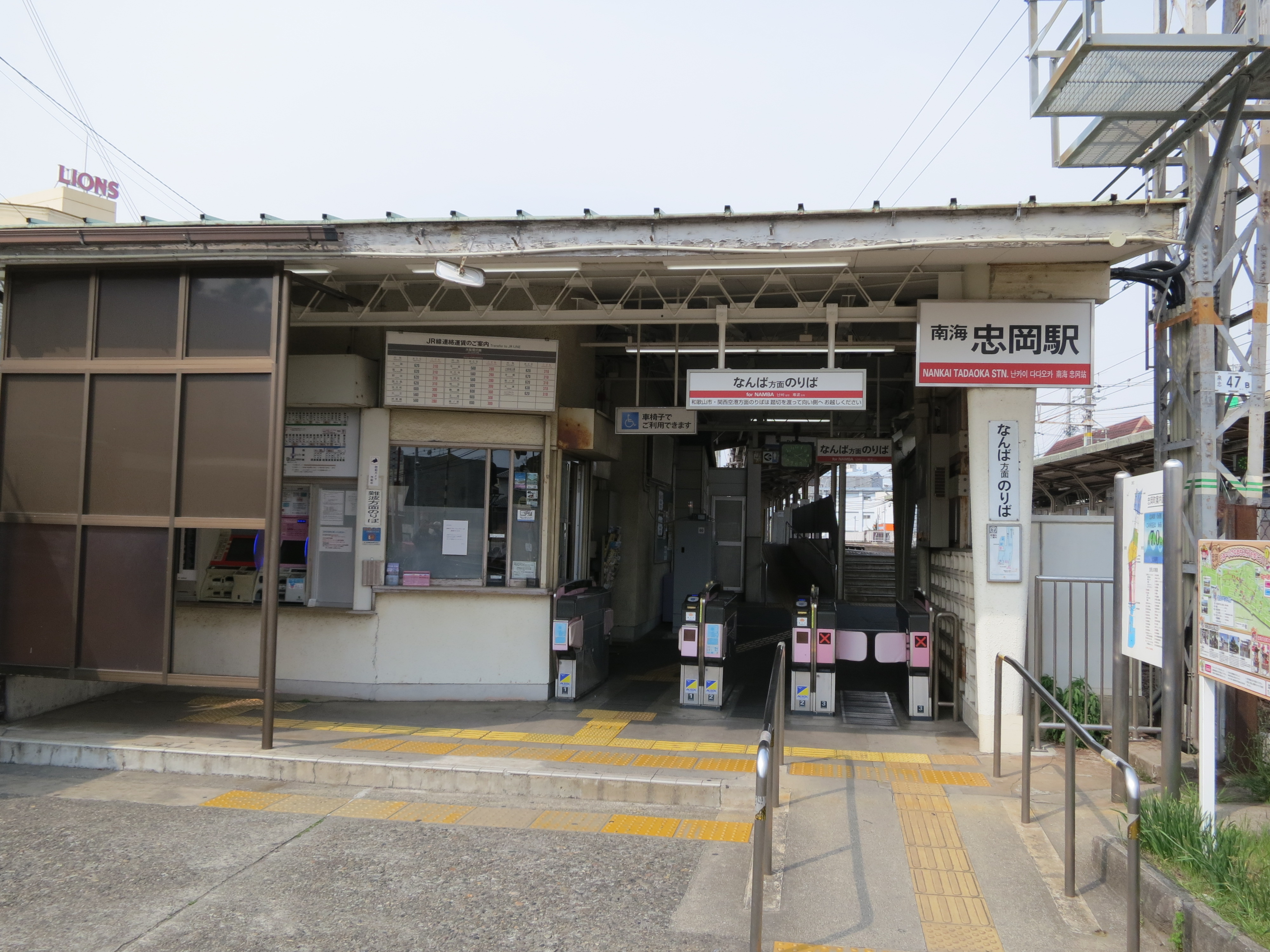
- Tadaoka Station, April 2019

General information
- Location: 5-1, Tadaokaminami 1-chome, Tadaoka-cho, Senboku-gun, Osaka-fu 595-0813; Japan
- Coordinates: 34°29′18″N 135°23′52″E
- Operator: Nankai Electric Railway
- Line: Nankai Main Line
- Distance: 22.3 km from Namba
- Platforms: 2 side platforms

Other information
- Station code: NK21
- Website: Official website

History
- Opened: 11 July 1925; 101 years ago

Passengers
- 2019: 9346 daily
Location
- Location within Osaka Prefecture Location within Japan

Tadaoka Station (忠岡駅, Tadaoka-eki) is a passenger railway station located in the town of Tadaoka, Osaka Prefecture, Japan, operated by the private railway operator Nankai Electric Railway. It has the station number "NK21".

== Lines ==
Tadaoka Station is served by the Nankai Main Line, and is 22.3 kilometers (13.9 mi) from the terminus of the line at Nanba.

== Layout ==
The station consists of two opposed side platforms. The platforms are independent of one another, and passengers wishing to change platforms must exit and re-enter the station.

=== Platforms ===
1	■ Nankai Main Line	for Wakayamashi and Kansai Airport
2	■ Nankai Main Line	for Namba

== Adjacent stations ==
«	Service	»
Nankai Main Line
Limited Express "rapi:t α" for Kansai Airport (特急ラピートα): Does not stop at this station
Limited Express "rapi:t β" (特急ラピートβ): Does not stop at this station
Limited Express "Southern" (特急サザン): Does not stop at this station
Limited Express without seat reservations (自由席特急): Does not stop at this station
Express (急行): Does not stop at this station
Airport Express (空港急行): Does not stop at this station
Sub. Express (区間急行): Does not stop at this station
Izumiōtsu	Semi-Express for Namba (準急, in the morning on weekdays)	Haruki
Izumiōtsu	Local (普通車)	Haruki

== History ==
Tadaoka Station opened on 11 July 1925.

== Passenger statistics ==
In fiscal 2019, the station was used by an average of 9346 passengers daily.

== Surrounding area ==
- Tadaoka Post Office Station West
- Tadaoka Municipal Tadaoka Junior High School Station East

== See also ==
- List of railway stations in Japan
