= Shimomatsu Station =

Railway station in Kishiwada, Osaka Prefecture, Japan

Shimomatsu Station 下松駅
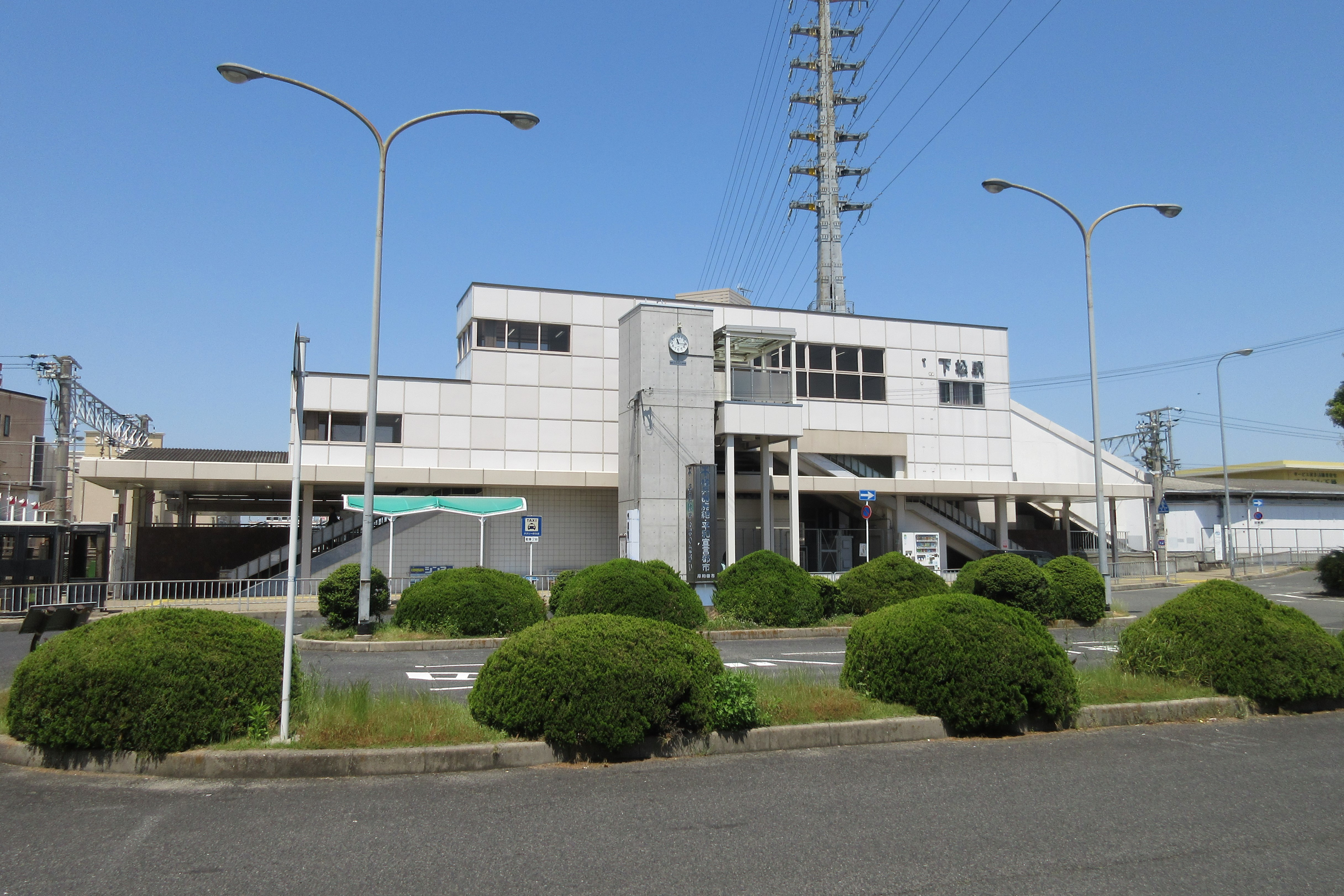
- Shimomatsu Station, May 2019

General information
- Location: 3-1, Shimomatsu-cho 3-chome, Kishiwada-shi, Osaka-fu 596-0823; Japan
- Coordinates: 34°27′26.87″N 135°23′48.72″E
- Owner: West Japan Railway Company
- Operator: West Japan Railway Company
- Line: R Hanwa Line
- Distance: 25.1 km (15.6 miles) from Tennōji
- Platforms: 2 side platforms
- Connections: Bus stop

Other information
- Status: Staffed
- Station code: JR-R39
- Website: Official website

History
- Opened: 1 April 1984

Passengers
- FY2019: 3878 daily
Location
- Location within Osaka Prefecture Location within Japan

Shimomatsu Station (下松駅, Shimomatsu-eki) is a passenger railway station in located in the city of Kishiwada, Osaka Prefecture, Japan, operated by West Japan Railway Company (JR West).

== Lines ==
Shimomatsu Station is served by the Hanwa Line, and is located 25.1 kilometres (15.6 miles) from the northern terminus of the line at Tennōji.

== Station layout ==
The station consists of two opposed side platforms connected to the station building by a level crossing. The station is staffed.

=== Platforms ===
1	■ R Hanwa Line	for Kansai Airport and Wakayama
2	■ R Hanwa Line	for Tennōji

== Adjacent stations ==
«	Service	»
JR West
Hanwa Line
Kumeda	Local	Higashi-Kishiwada
Kumeda	Regional Rapid Service	Higashi-Kishiwada
Direct Rapid Service: Does not stop at this station
Rapid Service: Does not stop at this station
Kansai Airport Rapid Service: Does not stop at this station
Kishuji Rapid Service: Does not stop at this station
Limited Express Kuroshio: Does not stop at this station
Limited Express Haruka: Does not stop at this station

== History ==
Shimomatsu Station opened on 1 April 1984. With the privatization of the Japan National Railways (JNR) on 1 April 1987, the station came under the aegis of the West Japan Railway Company.

Station numbering was introduced in March 2018 with Shimomatsu being assigned station number JR-R39.

== Passenger statistics ==
In fiscal 2019, the station was used by an average of 3,878 passengers daily (boarding passengers only).

== Surrounding Area ==
- Osaka Prefectural Road No. 30 Osaka Izumi Sennan Line
- Osaka Prefectural Kumeda High School
- Municipal Kishiwada Municipal Hospital
- Kishiwada City Industrial High School

== See also ==
- List of railway stations in Japan
