= Kumeda Station =

Railway station in Kishiwada, Osaka Prefecture, Japan

Kumeda Station 久米田駅
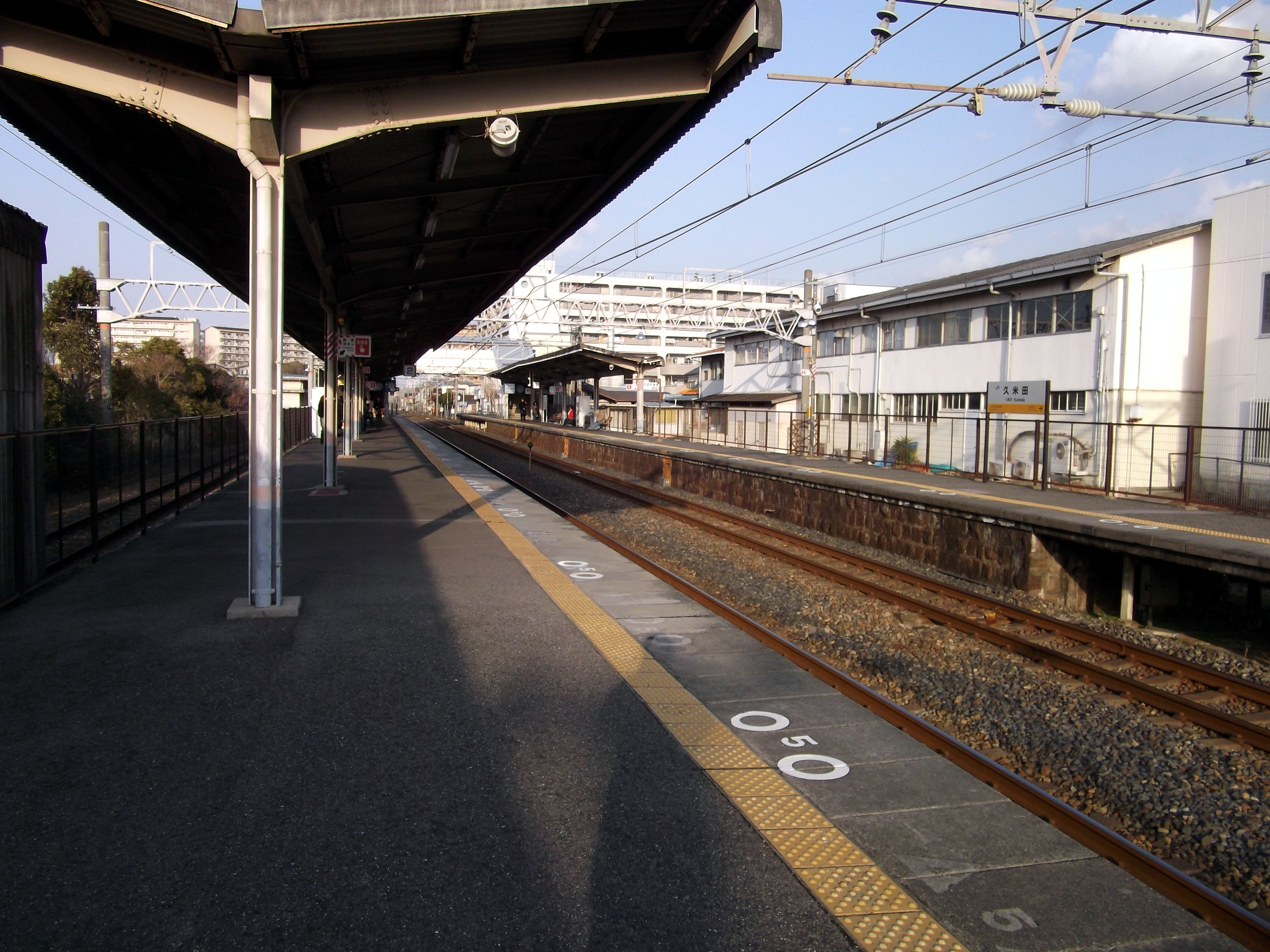
- Kameda Station, January 2011

General information
- Location: 373-2 Omachi, Kishiwada-shi, Osaka-fu 596-0812; Japan
- Coordinates: 34.4655°N 135.4055°E
- Owner: West Japan Railway Company
- Operator: West Japan Railway Company
- Line: R Hanwa Line
- Distance: 23.9 km (14.9 miles) from Tennōji
- Platforms: 2 side platforms
- Connections: Bus stop

Other information
- Status: Staffed (Midori no Madoguchi)
- Station code: JR-R38
- Website: Official website

History
- Opened: 16 June 1930

Passengers
- FY2019: 6613 daily
Location
- Location within Osaka Prefecture Location within Japan

Kumeda Station (久米田駅, Kumeda-eki) is a passenger railway station in located in the city of Kishiwada, Osaka Prefecture, Japan, operated by West Japan Railway Company (JR West).

== Lines ==
Kumeda Station is served by the Hanwa Line, and is located 23.9 kilometres (14.9 miles) from the northern terminus of the line at Tennōji.

== Station layout ==
The station consists of two opposed side platforms connected to the station building by a footbridge. The station has a Midori no Madoguchi staffed ticket office.

=== Platforms ===
| 1 | ■ R Hanwa Line | for Kansai Airport and Wakayama |
| 2 | ■ R Hanwa Line | for Tennōji |

== Adjacent stations ==
| « | Service | » |
JR West
Hanwa Line
| Izumi-Fuchū | Local | Shimomatsu |
| Izumi-Fuchū | Regional Rapid Service | Shimomatsu |
Direct Rapid Service: Does not stop at this station
Rapid Service: Does not stop at this station
Kansai Airport Rapid Service: Does not stop at this station
Kishuji Rapid Service: Does not stop at this station
Limited Express Kuroshio: Does not stop at this station
Limited Express Haruka: Does not stop at this station

== History ==
Kumeda Station opened on 16 June 1930. With the privatization of the Japan National Railways (JNR) on 1 April 1987, the station came under the aegis of the West Japan Railway Company.

Station numbering was introduced in March 2018 with Kumeda being assigned station number JR-R38.

== Passenger statistics ==
In fiscal 2019, the station was used by an average of 6,613 passengers daily (boarding passengers only).

== Surrounding Area ==
- Kumeda-dera
- Kaibukiyama Kofun (Morozuka)
- Kishiwada City Kumeda Junior High School
- Kishiwada City Yagi Elementary School
- Kishiwada City Yagiminami Elementary School
- Kumeda Hospital

== See also ==
- List of railway stations in Japan
