= Fukechō Station =

Railway station in Misaki, Osaka Prefecture, Japan

Fukechō Station 深日町駅
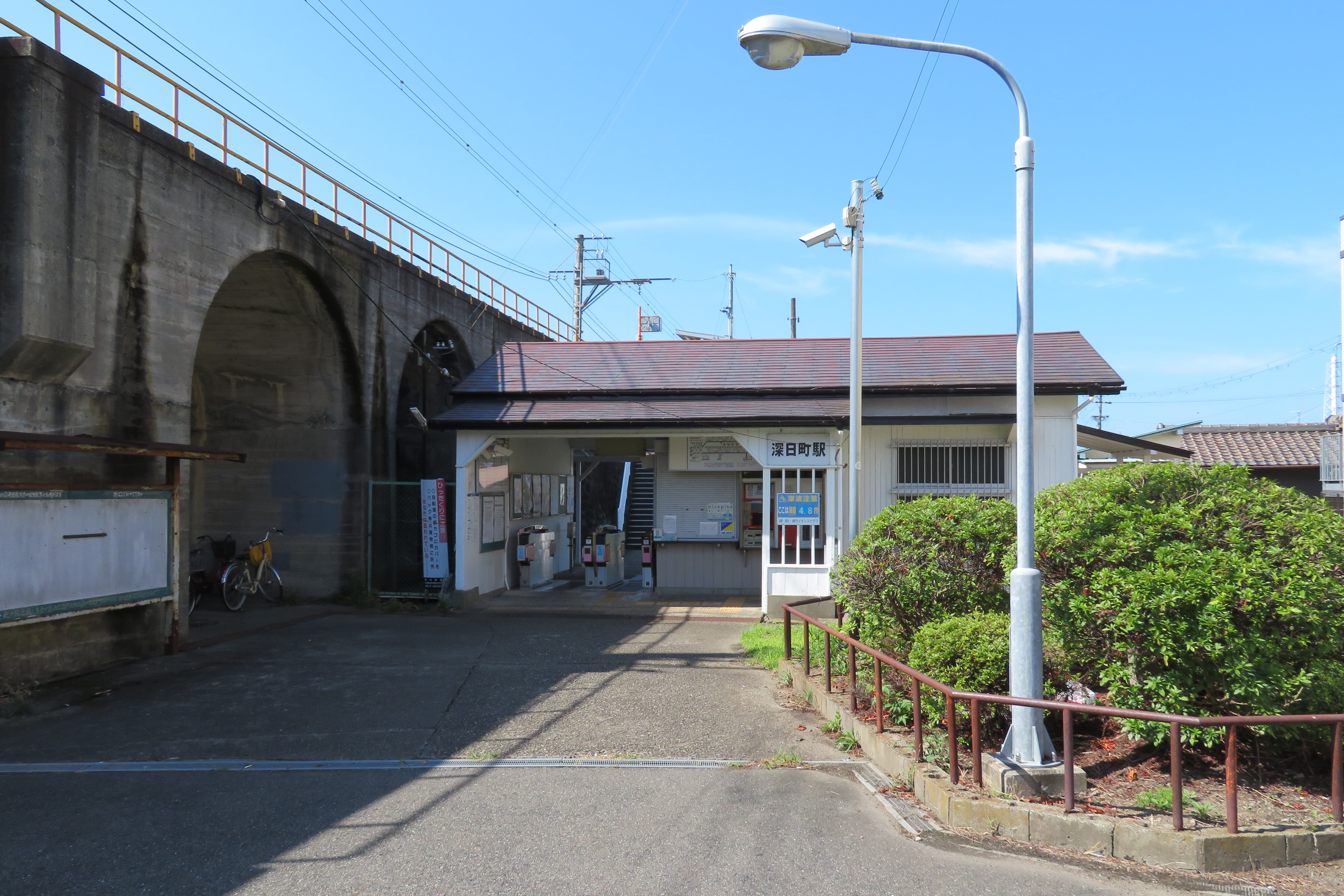
- Fukechō Station in October 2019

General information
- Location: 1433, Fuke, Misaki-cho, Sennan-gun, Osaka-fu 599-0303; Japan
- Coordinates: 34°19′06″N 135°08′56″E
- Operator: Nankai Electric Railway
- Line: Tanagawa Line
- Distance: 1.4km from Misaki-kōen
- Platforms: 1 side platform

Other information
- Station code: NK41-1
- Website: Official website

History
- Opened: June 1, 1944

Passengers
- 2019: 488 daily

Services
| Preceding station | Nankai Electric Railway | Following station |
|---|---|---|
| Misaki-kōen Terminus | Tanagawa Line | Fukekō towards Tanagawa |
Location
- Location within Osaka Prefecture Location within Japan

Fukechō Station (深日町駅, Fukechō-eki) is a passenger railway station located in the town of Misaki, Sennan District, Osaka Prefecture, Japan, operated by the private railway operator Nankai Electric Railway. It has the station number "NK41-1".

== Lines ==
Fukechō Station is served by the Tanagawa Line, and is 1.4 kilometers from the terminus of the line at Misaki-kōen.

== Layout ==
The station consists of a single side platform on an embankment. The station is unattended.

== History ==
Fukechō Station opened on June 1, 1944.

== Passenger statistics ==
In fiscal 2019, the station was used by an average of 488 passengers daily.

== Surrounding area ==
Osaka Prefectural Road No. 752 Wakayama Hannan Line and Osaka Prefectural Road No. 65 Misaki Kada Line intersect in front of the station

== See also ==
- List of railway stations in Japan
