= Fukekō Station =

Railway station in Misaki, Osaka Prefecture, Japan

Fukekō Station 深日港駅
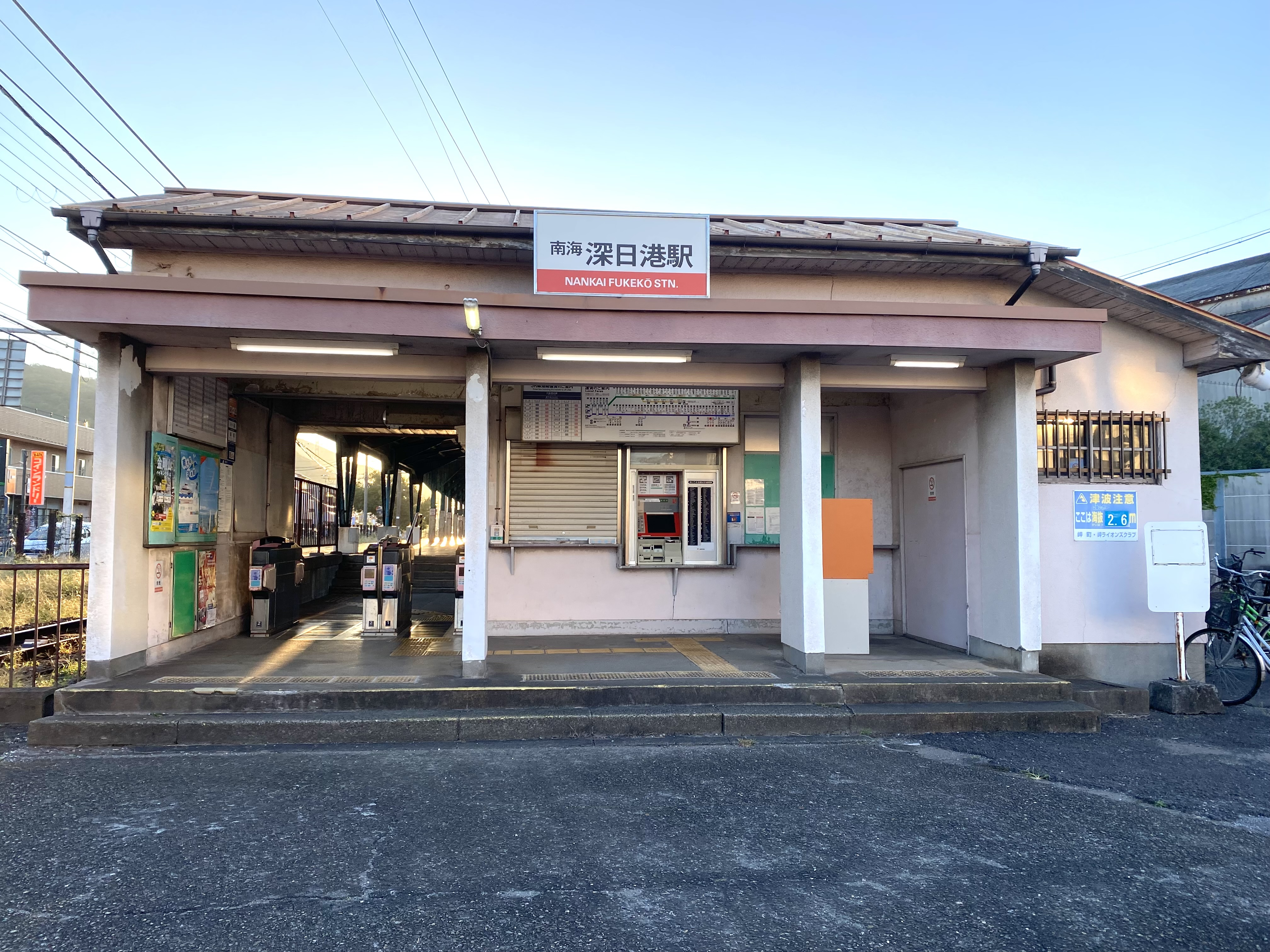
- Fukekō Station entrance in October, 2021

General information
- Location: 2535, Fuke, Misaki-cho, Sennan-gun, Osaka-fu 599-0303; Japan
- Coordinates: 34°19′03″N 135°08′30″E
- Operator: Nankai Electric Railway
- Line: Tanagawa Line
- Platforms: 1 side platform
- Connections: Bus stop

Other information
- Station code: NK41-2
- Website: Official website

History
- Opened: November 3, 1948

Passengers
- 2019: 698 daily

Services
Preceding station	Nankai Electric Railway	Following station
Fukechō towards Misaki-kōen	Tanagawa Line	Tanagawa Terminus
Location
- Location within Osaka Prefecture Location within Japan

Fukekō Station (深日港駅, Fukekō-eki) is a passenger railway station located in the town of Misaki, Sennan District, Osaka Prefecture, Japan, operated by the private railway operator Nankai Electric Railway. It has the station number "NK41-2".

== Lines ==
Fukekō Station is served by the Tanagawa Line, and is 2.1 kilometers from the terminus of the line at Misaki-kōen.

== Layout ==
The station consists of one side platform serving a single bi-directional track. The station is unattended.

== History ==
Fukekō Station opened on November 3, 1948.

== Passenger statistics ==
In fiscal 2019, the station was used by an average of 698 passengers daily.

== Surrounding area ==
- Misaki Town Office

== See also ==
- List of railway stations in Japan
