= Kaie-ji temple ruins =

Hakuhō period Buddhist temple ruins

Kaeji temple ruins
- 海会寺跡 (Japanese)
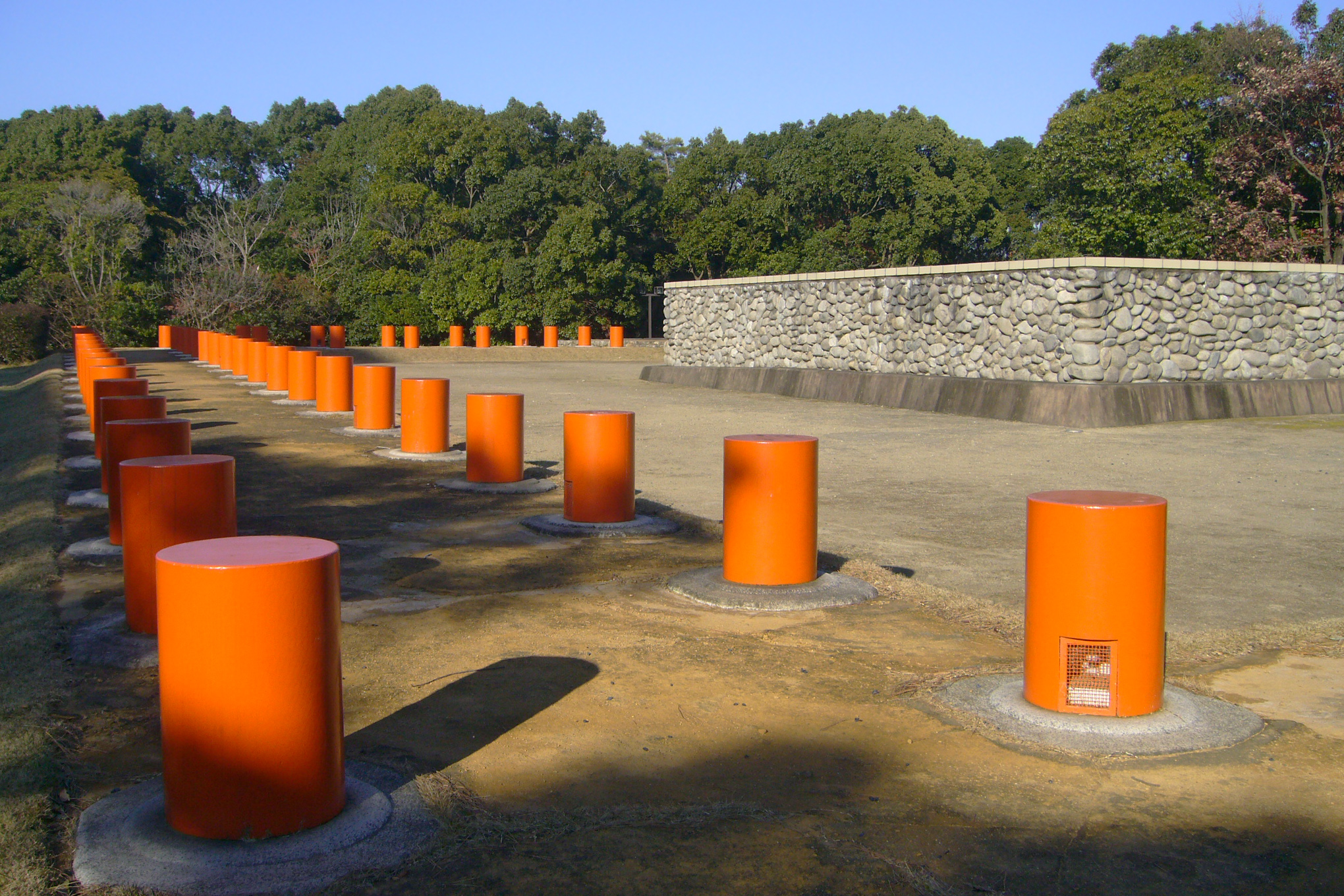
- Kaeji temple ruins, foundations of cloister and pagoda

- Kaeji temple ruins Kaie-ji temple ruins (Japan)
- Interactive map of Kaeji temple ruins
- 34°22′31.7″N 135°17′25.6″E
- Type: temple ruins
- Periods: Hakuhō period
- Location: Sennan, Osaka, Japan
- Region: Kansai region

History
- Built: 7th century AD

Site notes
- Public access: Yes (archaeological park, museum)

The Kaieji temple ruins (海会寺跡, Kaeji ato), is an archaeological site with the ruins of a Hakuhō period Buddhist temple located in the Shindachionoshiro neighborhood of the city of Sennan, Osaka, Japan. The temple no longer exists, but the temple grounds were designated as a National Historic Site in 1987.

== Overview ==
Kaeji temple ruins are located near the coast of Osaka Bay, on a stepped hill with an elevation of about 20 meters at the southernmost tip of the Sennan region, and mostly within the precincts of a Shinto Shrine named Ichioka Jinja (一岡神社). The site first came to academic interest in 1936, when a preliminary archaeological excavation found the foundations of a temple with a layout patterned after Hōryū-ji in Ikaruga, Nara, and the site of large residence belonging to a powerful local clan leader. The design of the roof tiles indicated that the temple was built in the Asuka period, or the latter half of the 7th century. The foundations of the Kondō in the east and a Pagoda in the west, surrounded by a cloister, as well as the foundations of the Lecture Hall were confirmed in subsequent excavations from 1981 through 1986. The temple appears to have survived into the Muromachi period; however, there is no documentary record of the temple. The name "Kaie-ji" is a modern local geographic name, and may or may not correspond to the name of this temple.

Of the excavated items, 302 pieces were collectively designated as National Important Cultural Properties in 1995 and are stored and exhibited in the adjacent Ancient History Museum (古代史博物館, Kodaishi Hakubutsukan). These include many varieties of roof tiles, fragments of statuary and metal decorations from the ruined pagoda, as well as ceramic shards. Portions of the site have been preserved as an archaeological park.It is located a 25-minute walk from Okadaura Station on the Nankai Main Line.

== Gallery ==
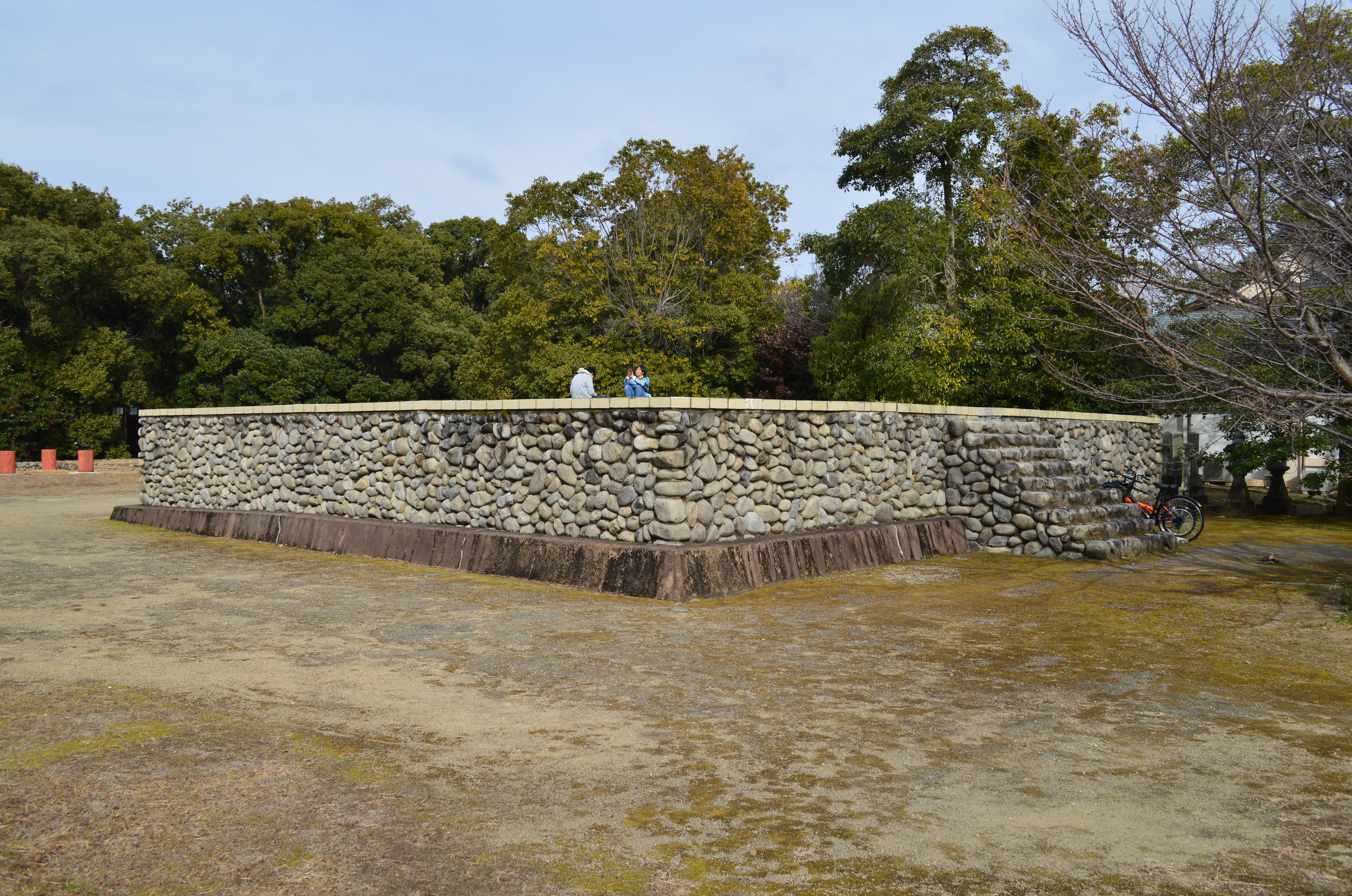
Foundation of the Pagoda

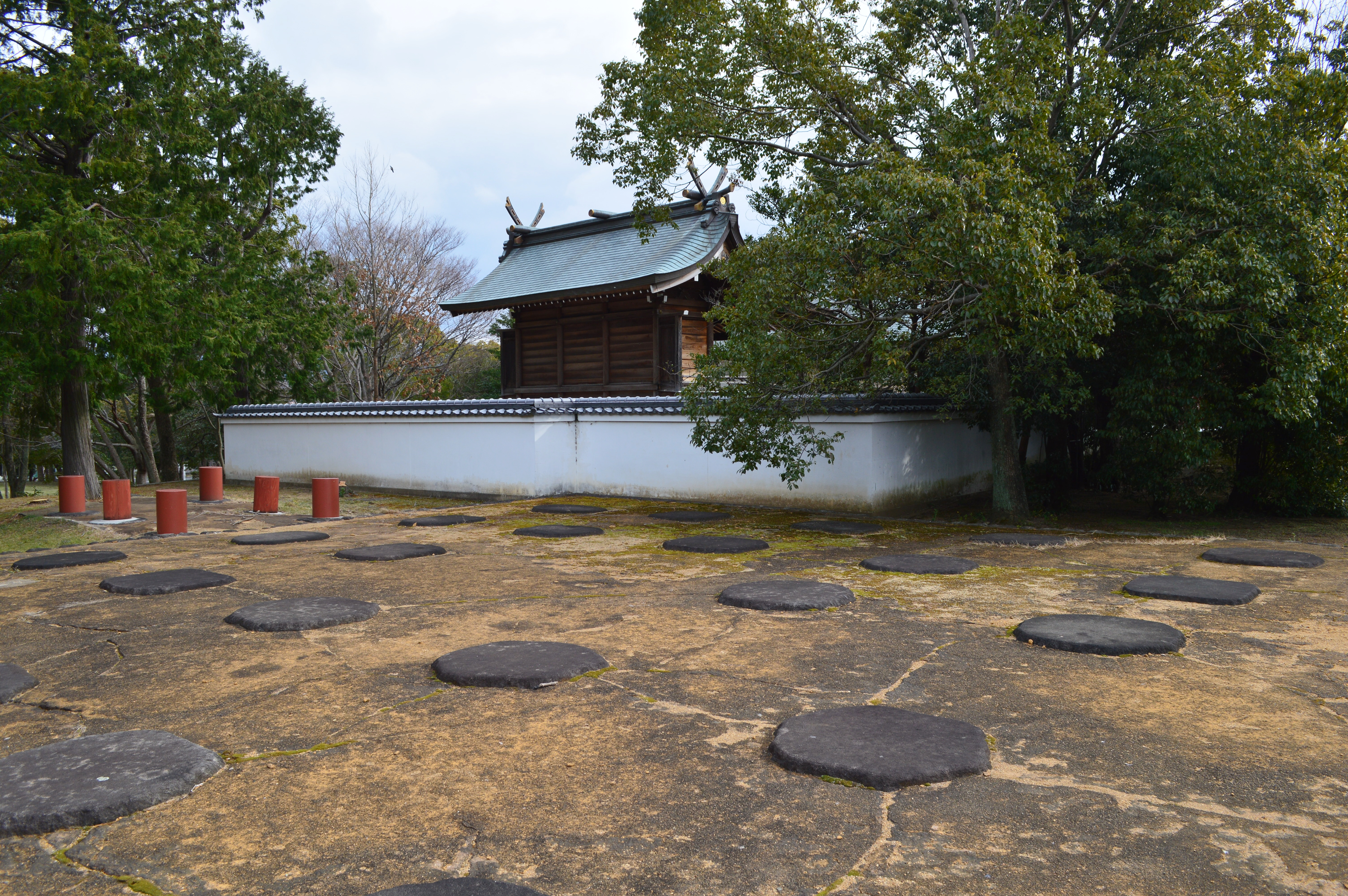
Foundation of the Lecture Hall, and Ichioka Jinja which is located on the site of the Kondō

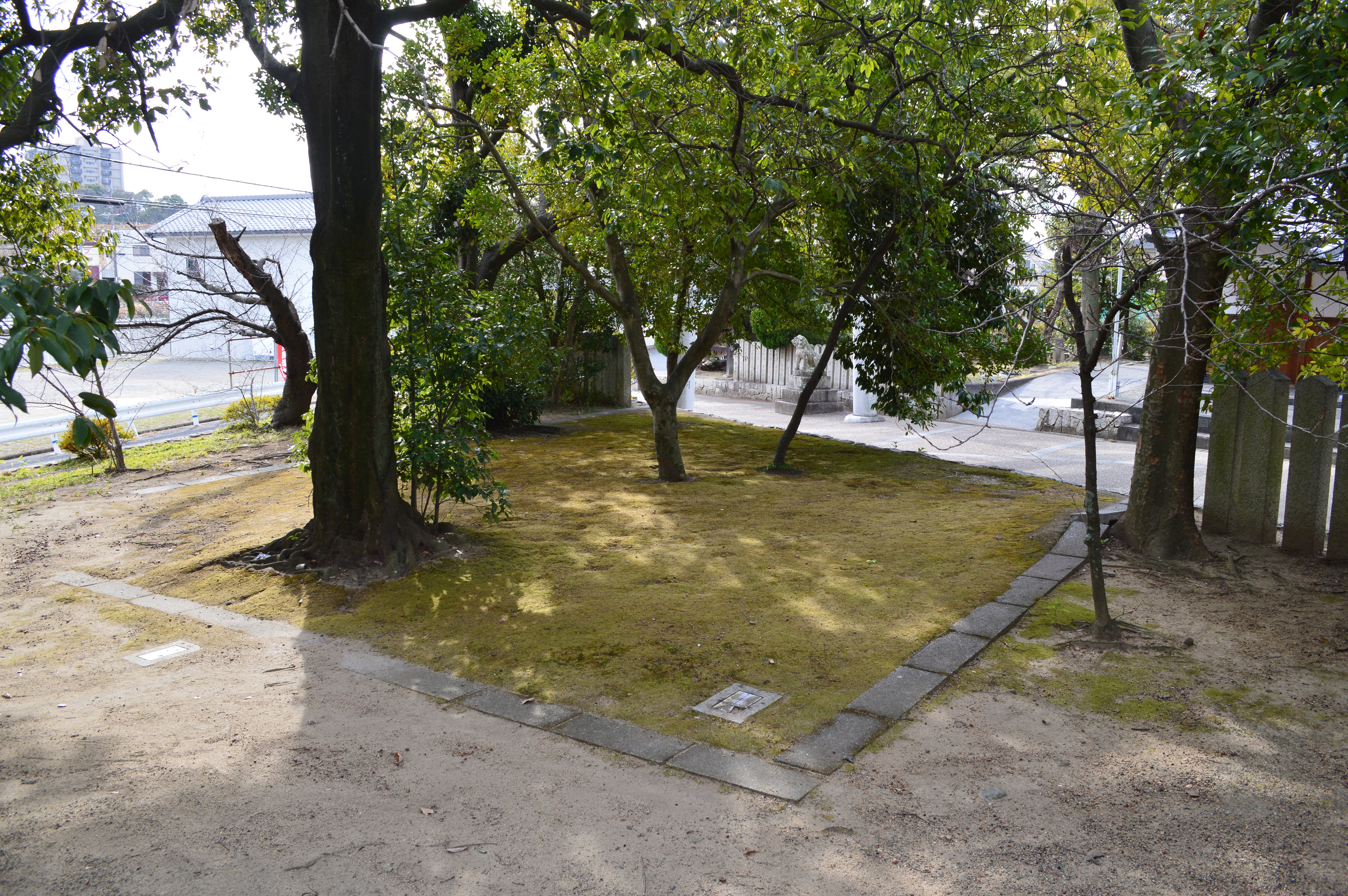
Foundations of the South Gate

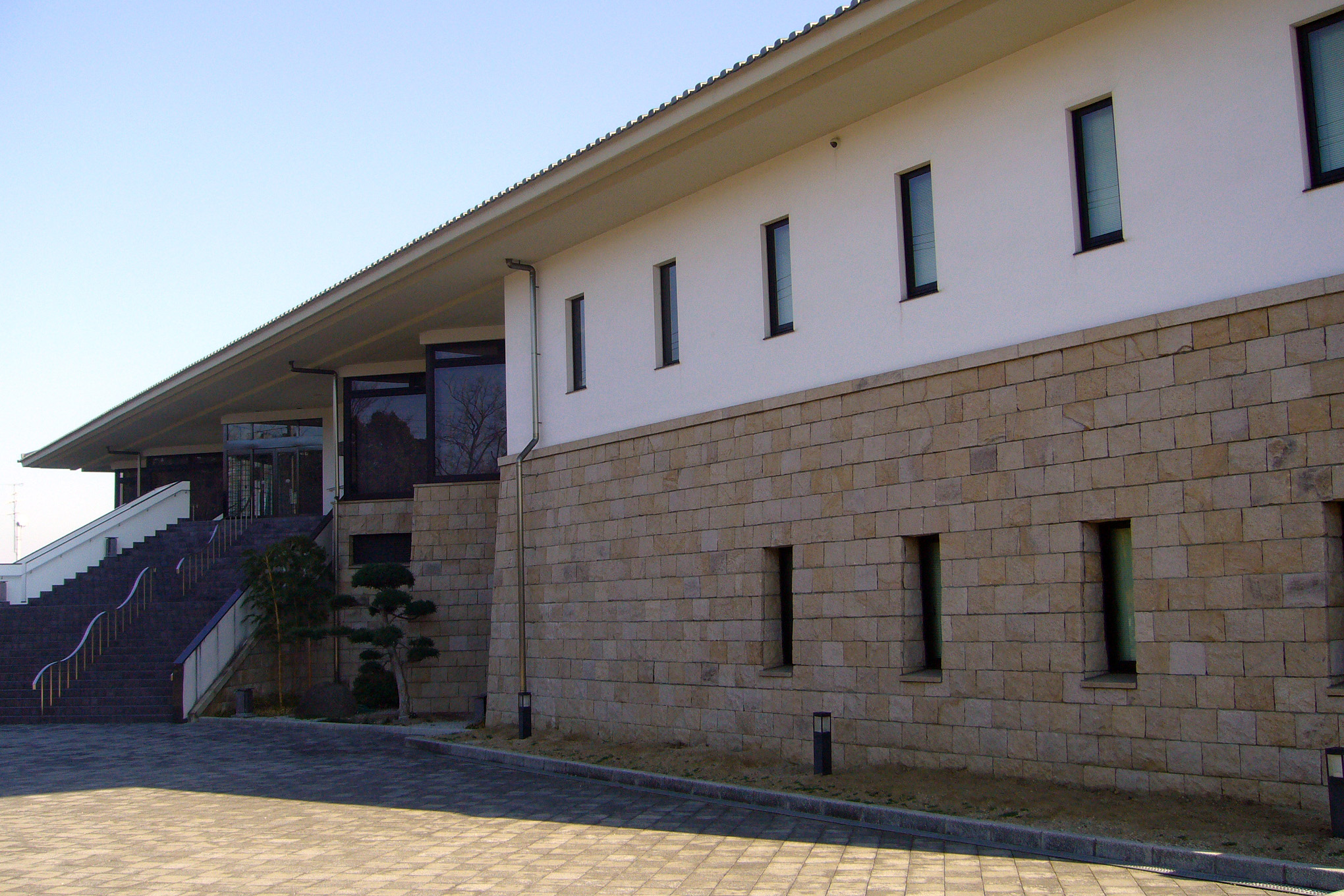
Ancient History Museum

== See also ==
- List of Historic Sites of Japan (Osaka)
