= Tannowa Station =

Railway station in Misaki, Osaka Prefecture, Japan

Tannowa Station 淡輪駅
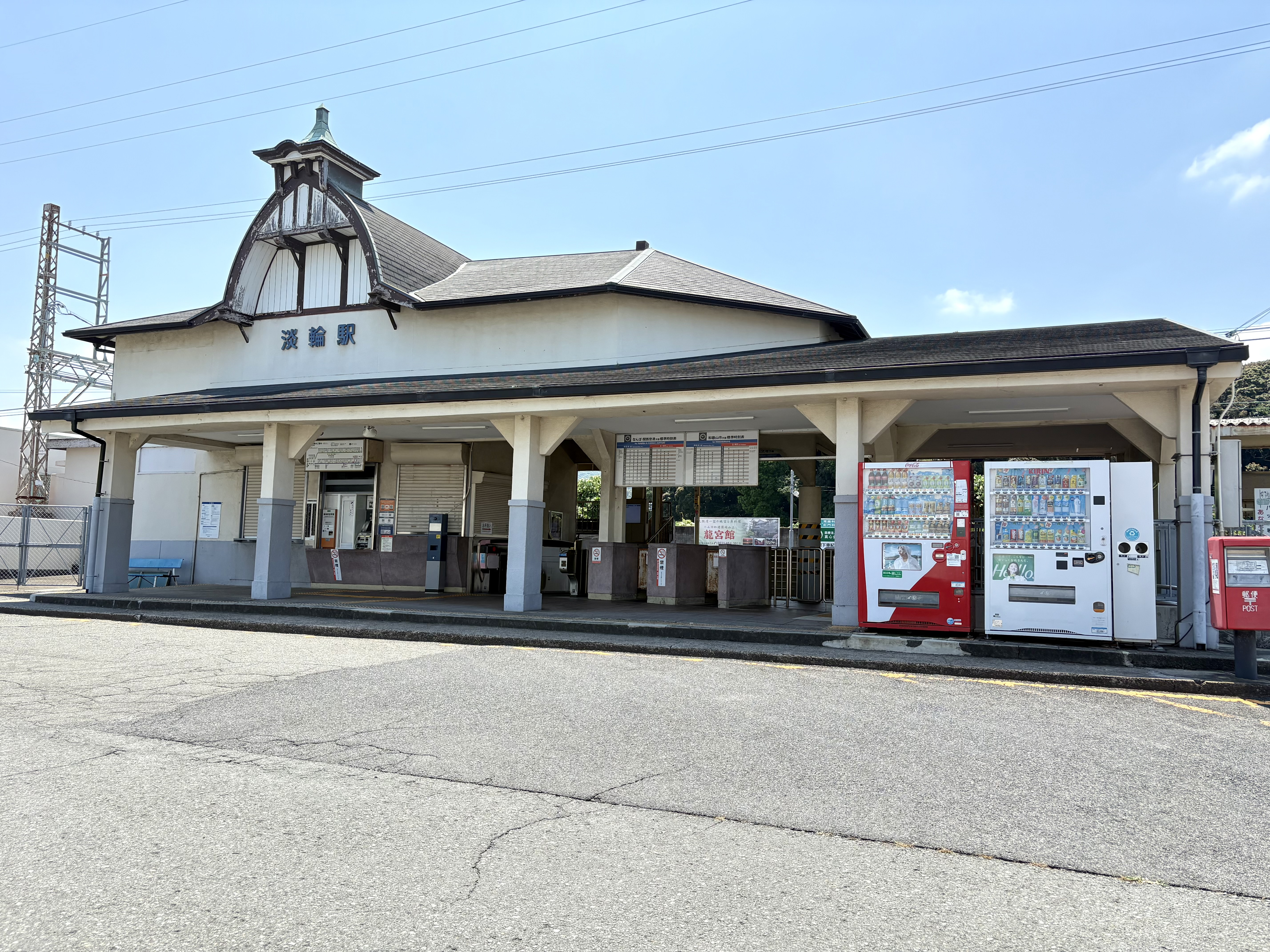
- Tannowa Station entrance in July 2025

General information
- Location: 1197, Tannowa, Misaki-cho, Sennan-gun, Osaka-fu 599-030; Japan
- Coordinates: 34°19′53″N 135°10′43″E
- Operator: Nankai Electric Railway
- Line: Nankai Main Line
- Distance: 50.2 km from Namba
- Platforms: 2 side platforms
- Connections: Bus stop

Other information
- Station code: NK40
- Website: Official website

History
- Opened: 15 August 1906; 120 years ago

Passengers
- 2019: 2180 daily

Services
| Preceding station | Nankai Electric Railway | Following station |
|---|---|---|
| Hakotsukuri towards Namba | Nankai Main Line Local Sub. Express | Misaki-kōen towards Wakayamashi |
Location
- Location within Osaka Prefecture Location within Japan

Tannowa Station (淡輪駅, Tannowa-eki) is a passenger railway station located in the town of Misaki, Sennan District, Osaka Prefecture, Japan, operated by the private railway operator Nankai Electric Railway. It has the station number "NK40".

== Lines ==
Tannowa Station is served by the Nankai Main Line, and is 50.2 kilometers (31.2 mi) from the terminus of the line at Namba.

== Layout ==
The station consists of two opposed side platforms connected by an underground passage. The station is unattended.

=== Platforms ===
| 1 | ■ Nankai Main Line | for Wakayamashi |
| 2 | ■ Nankai Main Line | for Namba and Kansai Airport |

== History ==
Tannowa Station opened on 15 August 1906, initially as a provisional stop, and then with regular services from 1910.

== Passenger statistics ==
In fiscal 2019, the station was used by an average of 2180 passengers daily.

== Surrounding area ==
- Sennan Satoumi Park
- Tannowa Beach (Tokimeki Beach)
- Tannowa Yacht Harbor

== See also ==
- List of railway stations in Japan
