= Kumatori Station =

Railway station in Kumatori, Osaka Prefecture, Japan

Kumatori Station 熊取駅
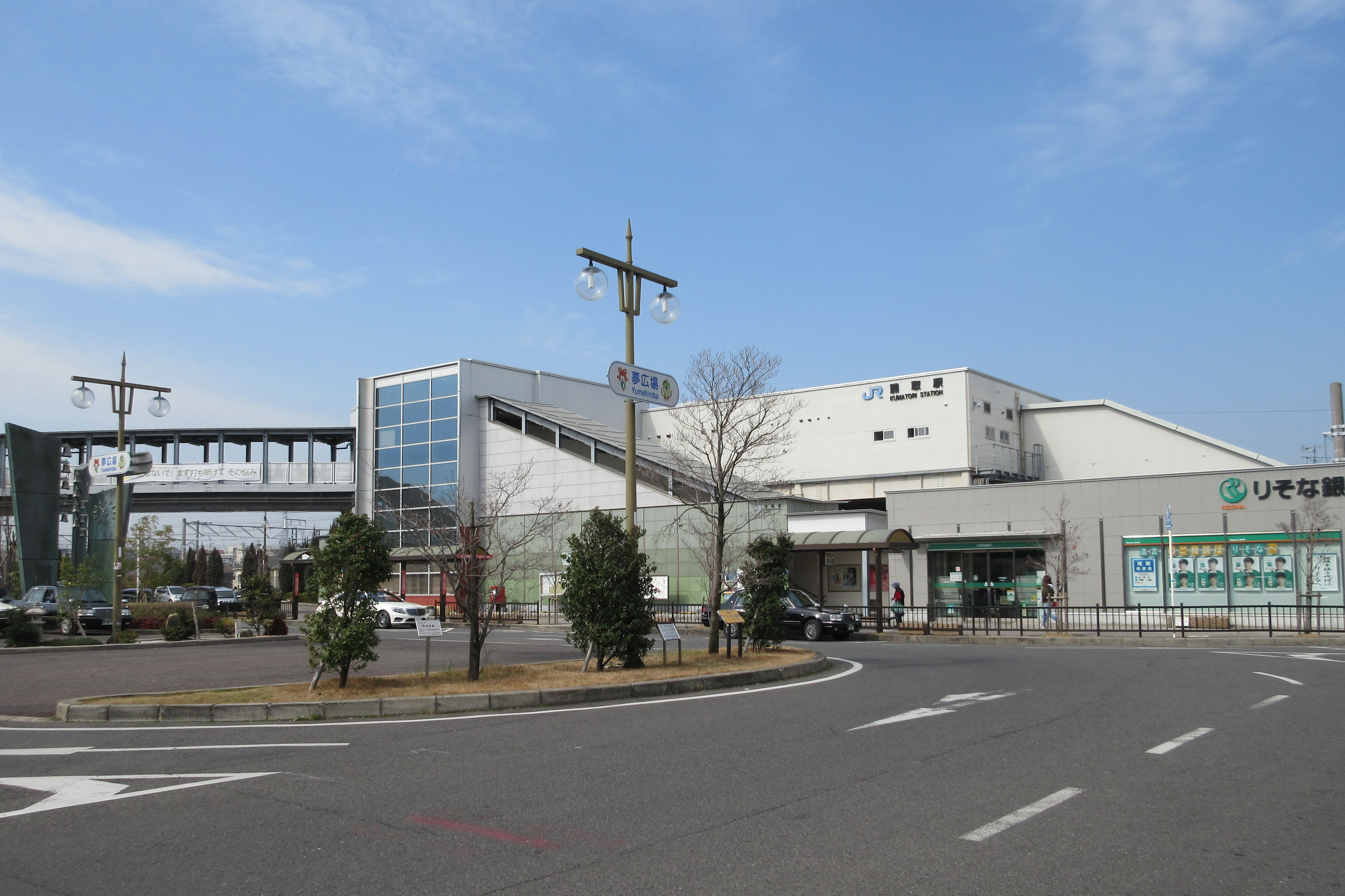
- Kumatori Station, March 2019

General information
- Location: 1-17-1 Okubonaka, Kumatori-cho, Sennan-gun, Osaka-fu 590-0403; Japan
- Coordinates: 34.4059°N 135.3413°E
- System: JR-West commuter rail station
- Owner: West Japan Railway Company
- Operator: West Japan Railway Company
- Line: R Hanwa Line
- Distance: 33.0 km (20.5 miles) from Tennōji
- Platforms: 2 island platforms
- Tracks: 4
- Train operators: West Japan Railway Company

Construction
- Structure type: At grade

Other information
- Status: Staffed
- Station code: JR-R44
- Website: Official website

History
- Opened: 16 June 1930

Passengers
- FY2019: 10,978 daily
Services
Preceding station	JR-West	Following station
Hanwa Line
Limited Express Kuroshio: Does not stop at this station
Limited Express Haruka: Does not stop at this station
Higashi-Sano	Local	Hineno
Higashi-Sano	Regional Rapid Service	Hineno
Higashi-Kishiwada	Direct Rapid Service	Hineno
Higashi-Kishiwada	Rapid Service	Hineno
Higashi-Kishiwada	Kansai Airport Rapid Service; Kishuji Rapid Service	Hineno
|}
Location
- Location within Osaka Prefecture Location within Japan

Kumatori Station (熊取駅, Kumatori-eki) is a passenger railway station in located in the town of Kumatori, Osaka Prefecture, Japan, operated by West Japan Railway Company (JR West).

== Lines ==
Kumatori Station is served by the Hanwa Line and is located 33.0 kilometres from the northern terminus of the line at Tennōji.

== Station layout ==
The station consists of two island platforms connected by an elevated station building. The station is staffed.

=== Platforms ===
1, 2	■ R Hanwa Line	for Kansai Airport and Wakayama
3, 4	■ R Hanwa Line	for Tennōji

== Adjacent stations ==
«	Service	»
JR West
Hanwa Line
Higashi-Sano	Local	Hineno
Higashi-Sano	Regional Rapid Service	Hineno
Higashi-Kishiwada	Direct Rapid Service	Hineno
Higashi-Kishiwada	Rapid Service	Hineno
Higashi-Kishiwada	Kansai Airport Rapid Service; Kishuji Rapid Service	Hineno
Limited Express Kuroshio: Does not stop at this station
Kansai Airport Limited Express Haruka: Does not stop at this station

== History ==
Kumatori Station opened on 16 June 1930. With the privatization of the Japan National Railways (JNR) on 1 April 1987, the station came under the aegis of the West Japan Railway Company.

Station numbering was introduced in March 2018 with Kumatori being assigned station number JR-R44.

== Passenger statistics ==
In fiscal 2019, the station was used by an average of 10,978 passengers daily (boarding passengers only).

== Surrounding area ==
- Izumisano City Sanodai Elementary School
- Osaka University of Health and Sport Sciences
- Osaka University of Tourism
- Kansai Medical University

== See also ==
- List of railway stations in Japan
