= Kyōshi Station =

Railway station in Misaki, Osaka Prefecture, Japan

Kyōshi Station 孝子駅
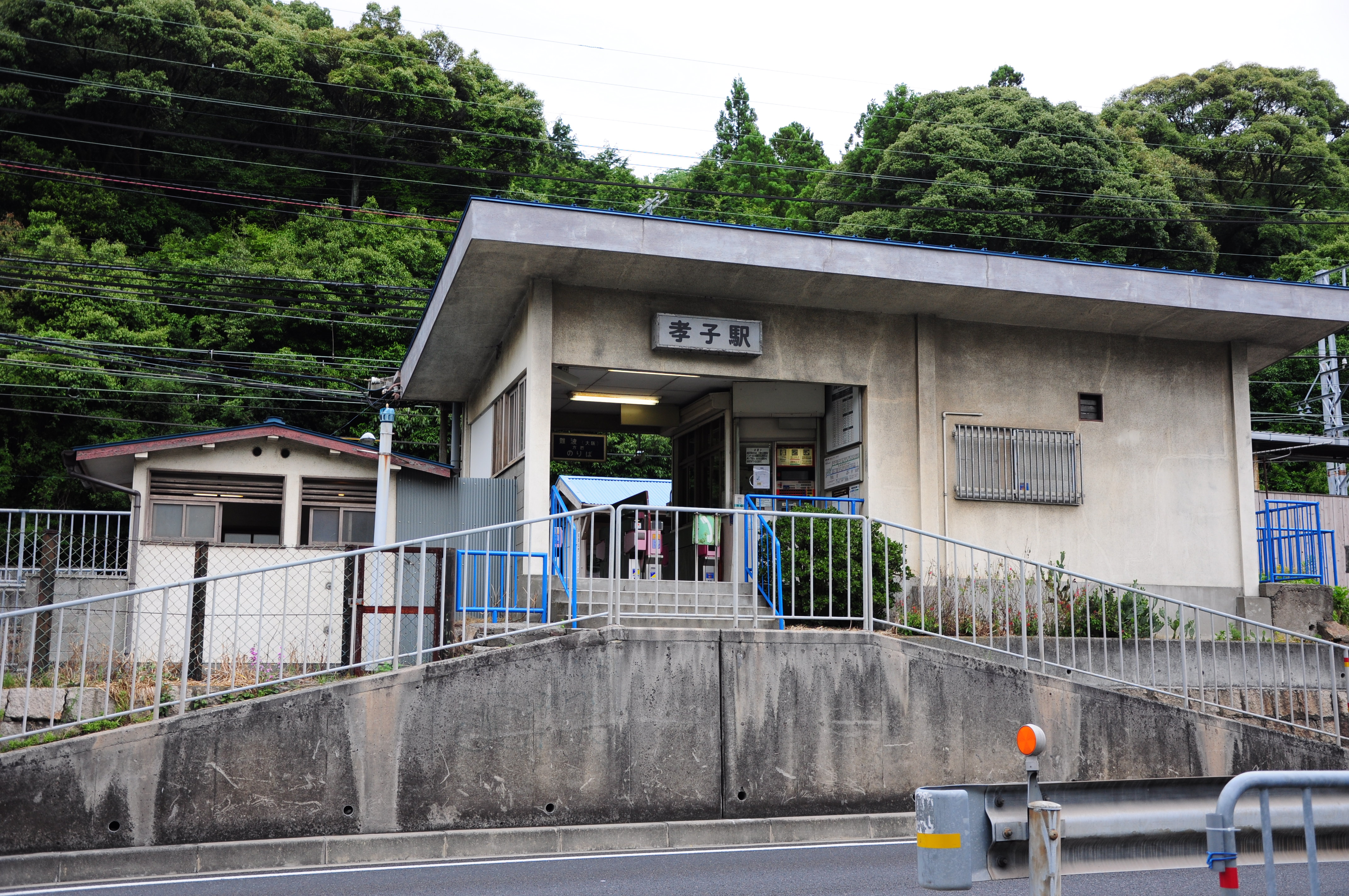
- Kyōshi Station entrance in June 2009

General information
- Location: 602, Kyōshi, Misaki-cho, Sennan-gun, Osaka-fu 599-0302; Japan
- Coordinates: 34°17′27″N 135°09′03″E
- Operator: Nankai Electric Railway
- Line: Nankai Main Line
- Platforms: 2 side platforms

Construction
- Cycle facilities: Yes
- Accessible: Yes

Other information
- Station code: NK42
- Website: Official website

History
- Opened: April 11, 1915

Passengers
- 2019: 115 daily
Location
- Location within Osaka Prefecture Location within Japan

Kyōshi Station (孝子駅, Kyōshi-eki) is a passenger railway station located in the town of Misaki, Sennan District, Osaka Prefecture, Japan, operated by the private railway operator Nankai Electric Railway. It has the station number "NK42".

== Lines ==
Kyōshi Station is served by the Nankai Main Line, and is 56.3 kilometers from the terminus of the line at Nanba.

== Layout ==
The station consists of two opposed side platforms connected by a level crossing. The station is unattended.

=== Platforms ===
| 1 | ■ Nankai Main Line | for Wakayamashi |
| 2 | ■ Nankai Main Line | for Namba and Kansai Airport |

== Adjacent stations ==
| « | Service | » |
Nankai Main Line (NK42)
| Misaki-kōen (NK41) | Sub. Express | Wakayamadaigakumae (Fujitodai) (NK43) |
| Misaki-kōen (NK41) | Local | Wakayamadaigakumae (Fujitodai) (NK43) |
Limited Express Southern: Does not stop at this station
Express: Does not stop at this station

== History ==
Kyōshi Station opened on as a temporary stopping 1910 and was made a full passenger station on April 11, 1915.

== Passenger statistics ==
In fiscal 2019, the station was used by an average of 115 passengers daily.

== Surrounding area ==
- Misaki History Museum

== See also ==
- List of railway stations in Japan
