= Wakayama University =

Higher education institution in Wakayama Prefecture, Japan

Coordinates: 34°15′57″N 135°09′07″E

- 和歌山大学
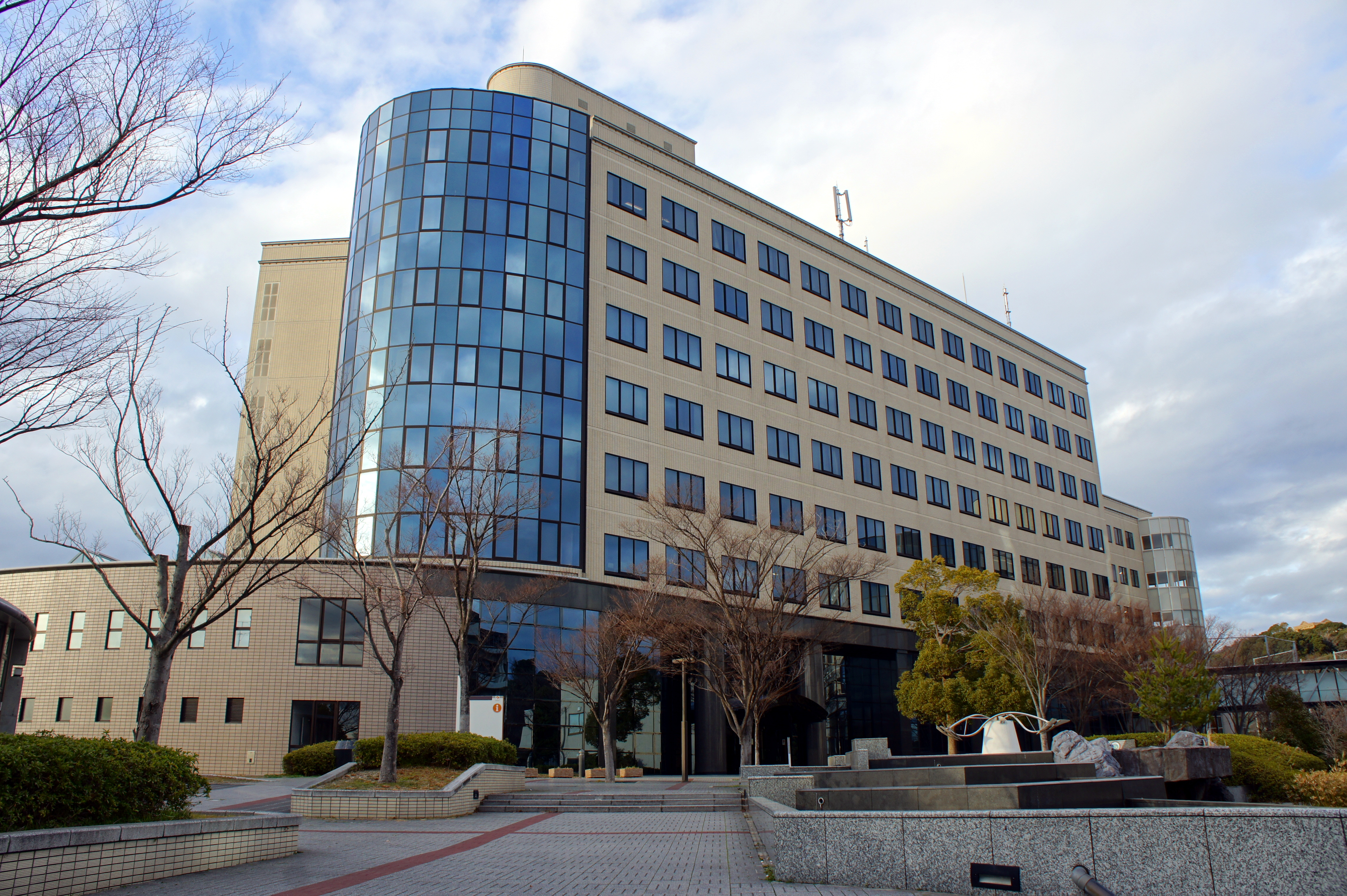
- Department of System Engineering
- Type: Public (National)
- Established: 1949
- President: Mitsugi Motoyama
- Faculty: 510
- Students: 4,090
- Location: Wakayama, Wakayama Prefecture, Japan
- Website: www.wakayama-u.ac.jp

Wakayama University (和歌山大学, Wakayama Daigaku), or Wadai (和大), is a national university located in Wakayama, Japan. It was founded in 1949 and is organized in four faculties.

== Organization ==
The university is divided into the following four faculties.

- Faculty of Education & Graduate School of Education
- Faculty of Economics & Graduate School of Economics
- Faculty of Systems Engineering & Graduate School of Systems Engineering
- Faculty of Tourism
- School of Socio-Infomatics

== History ==
Wakayama University was established in May 1949 as a new style of university with a goal and mission of "undertaking research and education in highly specialized academic fields based on a broad range of knowledge, mainly in academia and culture, in accordance with the spirit of the Fundamental Law of Education and the School Education Law, in order to foster individuals who will contribute to society."

The University was created through the integration of three educational institutions, each of which had its own long history and traditions: Wakayama Normal School (Men's Division and Women's Division), Wakayama Normal School for Youth, and Wakayama Technical School of Economics. In the beginning, there were two faculties - the Faculty of Liberal Arts (currently the Faculty of Education), and the Faculty of Economics. In 1995, the "Faculty of Systems Engineering" was established, followed by the "Faculty of Tourism" in 2008 and the "School of Socio-Infomatics" in 2023.

== See also ==
- Wakayamadaigakumae Station, the station on the Nankai Main Line nearest to the university
