= Wakayamadaigakumae Station =

Railway station in Wakayama, Wakayama Prefecture, Japan

Wakayamadaigakumae Station 和歌山大学前駅
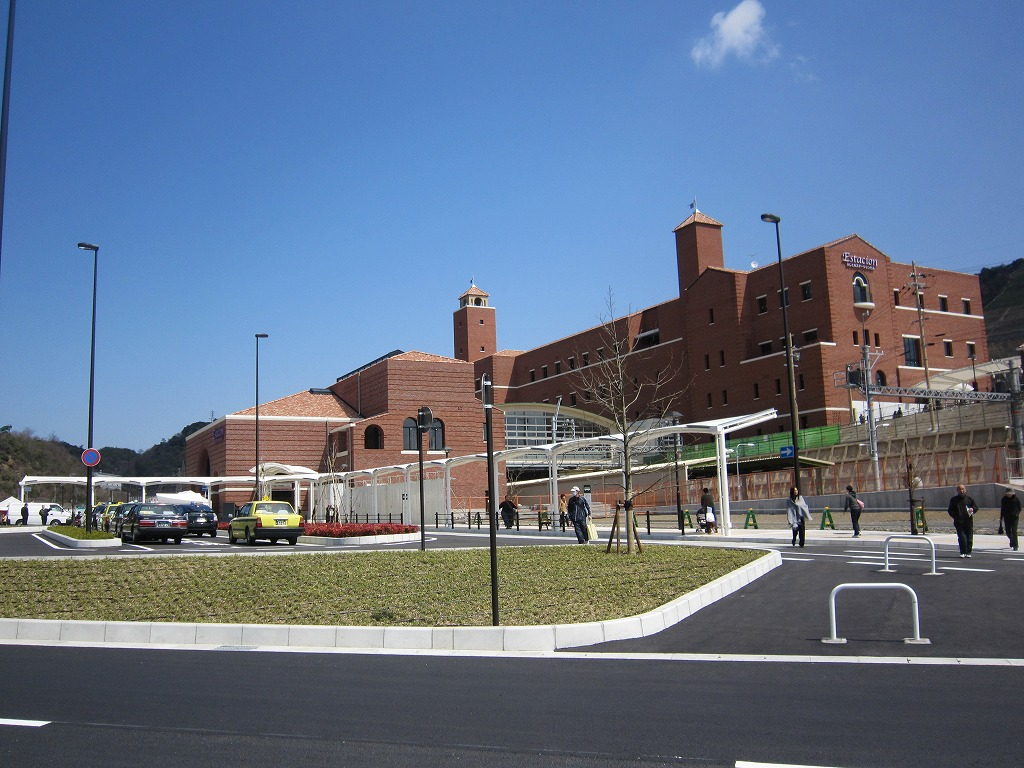
- West side of Wakayamadaigakumae Station in April 2012

General information
- Location: 575-3 Naka, Wakayama-shi, Wakayama-ken 640-8451; Japan
- Coordinates: 34°16′35″N 135°08′49″E
- Operator: Nankai Electric Railway
- Line: Nankai Main Line
- Platforms: 2 side platforms
- Tracks: 2
- Connections: Bus stop; Taxi stand

Construction
- Parking: Yes
- Cycle facilities: Yes
- Accessible: Yes

Other information
- Station code: NK43
- Website: Official website

History
- Opened: 1 April 2012

Passengers
- 2019: 9659 daily

Services
Preceding station	Nankai Electric Railway	Following station
Kyoshi towards Namba	Nankai Main Line Local Sub. Express	Kinokawa towards Wakayamashi
Misaki-kōen towards Namba	Nankai Main Line Express	Wakayamashi Terminus
Misaki-kōen towards Namba	Southern	Wakayamashi towards Wakayamashi or Wakayamakō
Location
- Location within Wakayama Prefecture Location within Japan

Wakayamadaigakumae Station (和歌山大学前駅, Wakayamadaigakumae-eki) is a passenger railway station located in the city of Wakayama, Wakayama Prefecture, Japan, operated by the private railway operator Nankai Electric Railway. As its name ("Front of Wakayama University Station") implies, it serves Wakayama University. Its station number is NK43.

== Lines ==
Wakayamadaigakumae Station is served by the Nankai Main Line and is 58.0 km (36.0 mi) from the terminus of the line at Namba.

== Station layout ==
The station has two side platforms with an elevated station building above the tracks and platforms.

=== Platforms ===
1	■ Nankai Main Line	for Wakayamashi
2	■ Nankai Main Line	for Namba and Kansai Airport

== History ==
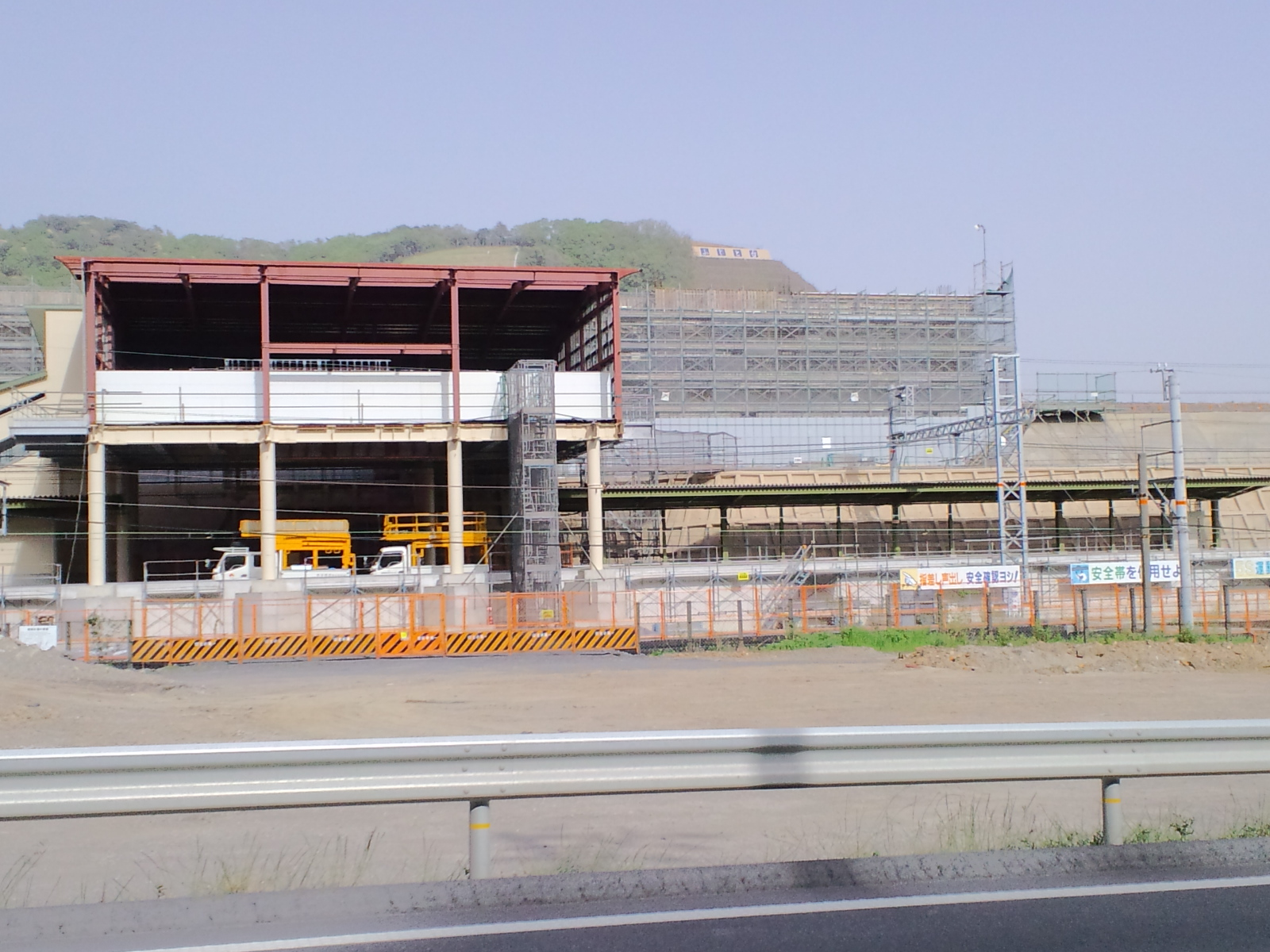
The station building under construction in May 2011

The name of the new station was publicly announced in September 2010. The station opened on 1 April 2012.

== Passenger statistics ==
In fiscal 2019, the station was used by an average of 9,659 passengers daily (boarding passengers only).

== Surrounding area ==
- Wakayama University Sakaedani Campus
- Fujitodai (New town)
- Noritsu Head Office

== See also ==
- List of railway stations in Japan
