= Kumatori, Osaka =

Kumatori 熊取町
- Town
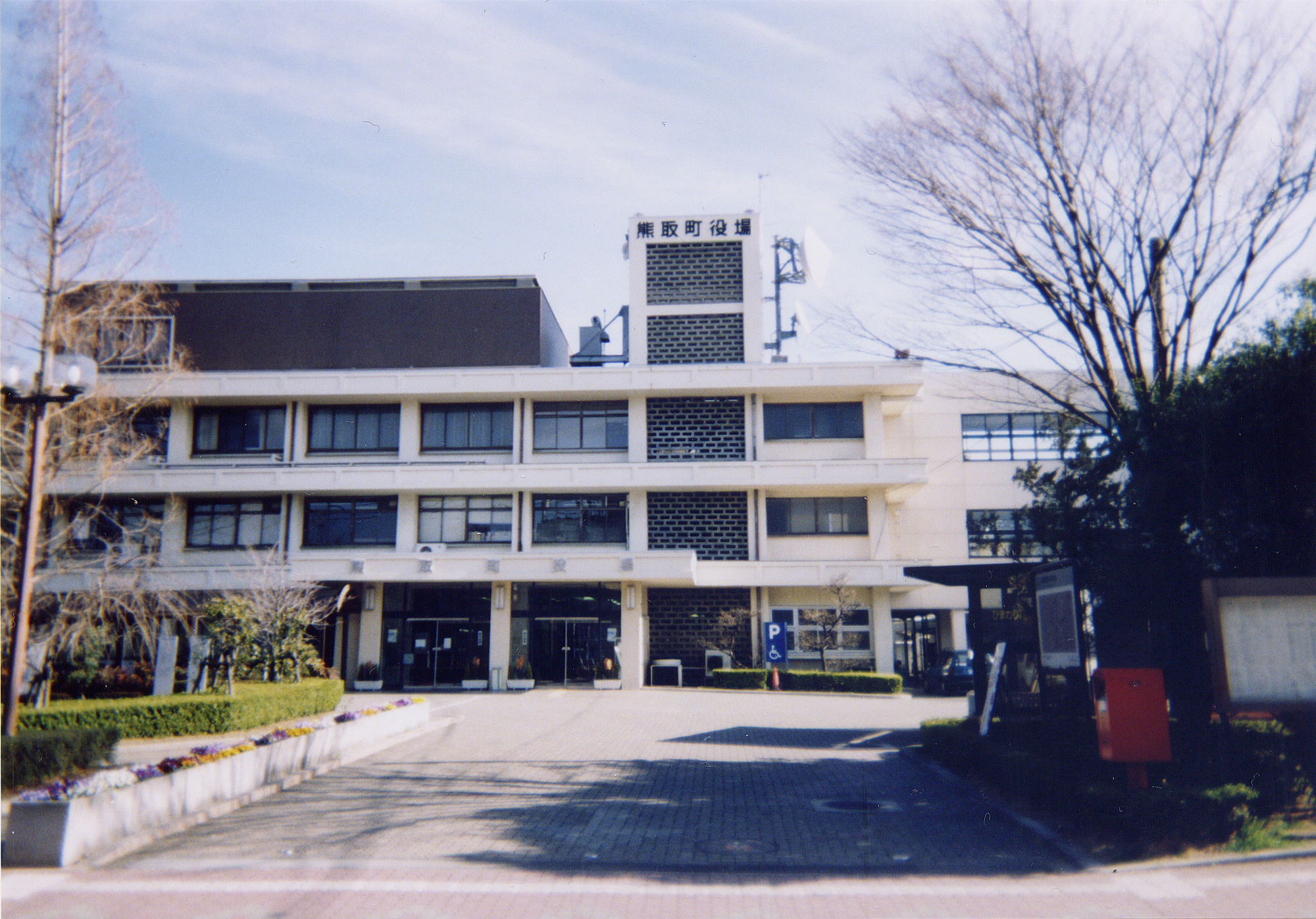
- Kumatori Town Hall

- Flag Emblem

- Location of Kumatori in Osaka Prefecture

- Location in Japan
- Coordinates: 34°24′N 135°21′E
- Country: Japan
- Region: Kansai; Kinki
- Prefecture: Osaka
- District: Sen'nan

Area
  - Total: 17.24 km^{2} (6.66 sq mi)

Population (December 31, 2021)
  - Total: 43,154
  - Density: 2,503/km^{2} (6,483/sq mi)
- Time zone: UTC+09:00 (JST)
- City hall address: 1-1-1, Noda, Kumatori-cho, Sennan-gun, Osaka-fu 590-0495
- Climate: Cfa
- Website: Official website
- Symbols
- Bird: Japanese white-eye
- Flower: Sunflower
- Tree: Prunus mume

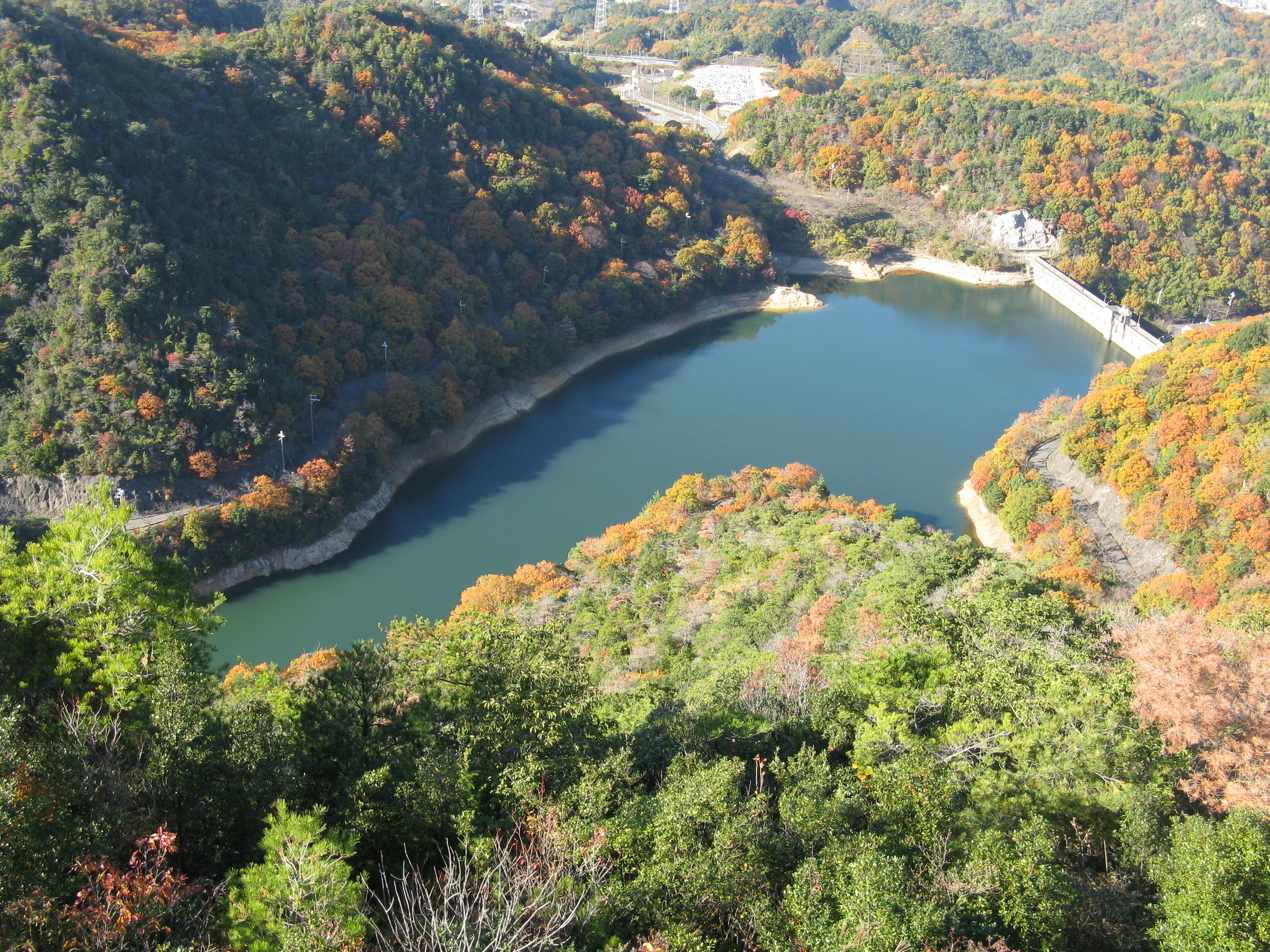
Eiraku Dam in theOkuyama-Ameyama Nature Park

Kumatori (熊取町, Kumatori-chō) is a town located in Sen'nan District, Osaka Prefecture, Japan. As of 31 December 2021, the town had an estimated population of 43,154 in 18377 households and a population density of 2500 persons per km^{2}. The total area of the town is 17.24 square kilometres (6.66 sq mi).

== Geography ==
Kumatori is located 30 kilometers from central Osaka, in the southern part of Osaka Prefecture, east of Izumisano City, where Kansai International Airport is located. The town is roughly in the shape of a leaf, about 4.8 kilometers east–west and 7.8 kilometers north–south. The eastern part is the foothills of the Izumi Mountains, and the ground is gradually lower from the southeast toward the northwest. The Mide, Uyama, and Sumiyoshi rivers that originate in the Izumi Mountains flow through the central part of the town towards Osaka Bay.

=== Neighboring municipalities ===
- Izumisano
- Kaizuka

=== Climate ===
Kumatori has a humid subtropical climate (Köppen Cfa) characterized by warm summers and cool winters with light to no snowfall. The average annual temperature in Kumatori is 16.0 °C (60.8 °F). The average annual rainfall is 1,332.5 mm (52.46 in) with June as the wettest month. The temperatures are highest on average in August, at around 27.6 °C (81.7 °F), and lowest in January, at around 5.3 °C (41.5 °F).

Climate data for Kumatori (1991−2020 normals, extremes 1977−present)
Month	Jan	Feb	Mar	Apr	May	Jun	Jul	Aug	Sep	Oct	Nov	Dec	Year
Record high °C (°F)	18.7 (65.7)	22.8 (73.0)	25.0 (77.0)	28.9 (84.0)	31.9 (89.4)	34.1 (93.4)	36.6 (97.9)	36.7 (98.1)	35.3 (95.5)	31.6 (88.9)	28.0 (82.4)	25.8 (78.4)	36.7 (98.1)
Mean daily maximum °C (°F)	8.8 (47.8)	9.6 (49.3)	13.4 (56.1)	19.0 (66.2)	23.7 (74.7)	26.7 (80.1)	30.6 (87.1)	32.0 (89.6)	28.2 (82.8)	22.5 (72.5)	16.9 (62.4)	11.5 (52.7)	20.2 (68.4)
Daily mean °C (°F)	5.3 (41.5)	5.6 (42.1)	8.9 (48.0)	14.1 (57.4)	18.8 (65.8)	22.4 (72.3)	26.5 (79.7)	27.6 (81.7)	23.7 (74.7)	18.1 (64.6)	12.7 (54.9)	7.8 (46.0)	16.0 (60.7)
Mean daily minimum °C (°F)	1.8 (35.2)	1.7 (35.1)	4.4 (39.9)	9.2 (48.6)	14.1 (57.4)	18.7 (65.7)	23.0 (73.4)	23.8 (74.8)	20.0 (68.0)	14.1 (57.4)	8.7 (47.7)	4.2 (39.6)	12.0 (53.6)
Record low °C (°F)	−3.8 (25.2)	−4.9 (23.2)	−2.9 (26.8)	−0.5 (31.1)	5.2 (41.4)	9.6 (49.3)	14.9 (58.8)	16.0 (60.8)	10.5 (50.9)	4.1 (39.4)	−0.3 (31.5)	−2.1 (28.2)	−4.9 (23.2)
Average precipitation mm (inches)	50.6 (1.99)	62.6 (2.46)	107.5 (4.23)	102.1 (4.02)	138.0 (5.43)	167.7 (6.60)	162.1 (6.38)	97.7 (3.85)	157.8 (6.21)	151.0 (5.94)	84.3 (3.32)	59.9 (2.36)	1,332.5 (52.46)
Average precipitation days (≥ 1.0 mm)	6.5	7.0	9.6	9.5	9.5	11.5	9.7	6.5	10.2	8.9	6.6	7.0	102.5
Mean monthly sunshine hours	122.9	133.5	172.2	190.2	195.7	144.1	183.3	226.4	159.3	160.6	138.3	120.8	1,947.3
Source: Japan Meteorological Agency

=== Demographics ===
Per Japanese census data, the population of Kumatori has been increasing over the past century.

Historical population
Year	Pop.	±%
1920	5,352	—
1930	5,997	+12.1%
1940	7,685	+28.1%
1950	9,463	+23.1%
1960	10,815	+14.3%
1970	13,808	+27.7%
1980	25,432	+84.2%
1990	38,905	+53.0%
2000	42,914	+10.3%
2010	45,072	+5.0%

== History ==
The area of the modern town of Kumatori was within ancient Izumi Province. As a place name, "Kumatori" appears in the ancient Nihon Kōki as a place where Emperor Kanmu went hunting in 804 AD. In the Kamakura period, the area was part of a landed estate called "Kumatori-no-shō". During the Edo Period, the area was largely under the control of Kishiwada Domain. The village Kumatori was established within Hine District with the creation of the modern municipalities system on April 1, 1889. On April 1, 1896, the area became part of Sennan District, Osaka. Kumatori was elevated to town status on November 3, 195.1

== Government ==
Kumatori has a mayor-council form of government with a directly elected mayor and a unicameral city council of 14 members. Kumatori collectively with the cities of Kaizuka, Sennan, Hannan and the minor municipalities of Sen'nan District contributes two members to the Osaka Prefectural Assembly. In terms of national politics, the town is part of Osaka 19th district of the lower house of the Diet of Japan.

== Economy ==
Since then Meiji period, Kumatori has been noted for its production of textiles, notably cotton cloth. Agriculture and horticulture also play major roles in the local economy. In exchange for hosting Kyoto University's Institute for Integrated Radiation and Nuclear Science, the government agreed to make Kumatori Station on the Hanwa Line a stop for express trains, which has contributed to large-scale residential land development and a rapid increase in population since 1963.

== Education ==
=== Universities and colleges ===
- Kyoto University's Institute for Integrated Radiation and Nuclear Science is located in Kumatori.
- Osaka University of Health and Sport Sciences
- Osaka University of Tourism

=== Primary and secondary education ===
Kumatori has five public elementary schools and three public middle schools operated by the town government, and one public combined middle/high school operated by the Osaka Prefectural Board of Education.

== Transportation ==
=== Railways ===
JR West – Hanwa Line

- Kumatori

=== Highways ===
- National Route 170

== Local attractions ==
- Okuyama-Ameyama Nature Park

== Sister cities ==
- Mildura, Victoria, Australia

== Notable people from Kumatori ==
- Toru Murata, baseball player
- Sei Muroya, football player
- Yuhei Nakaushiro, baseball player
