= Tanagawa Line =

Railway line in Osaka prefecture, Japan

Nankai Tanagawa Line
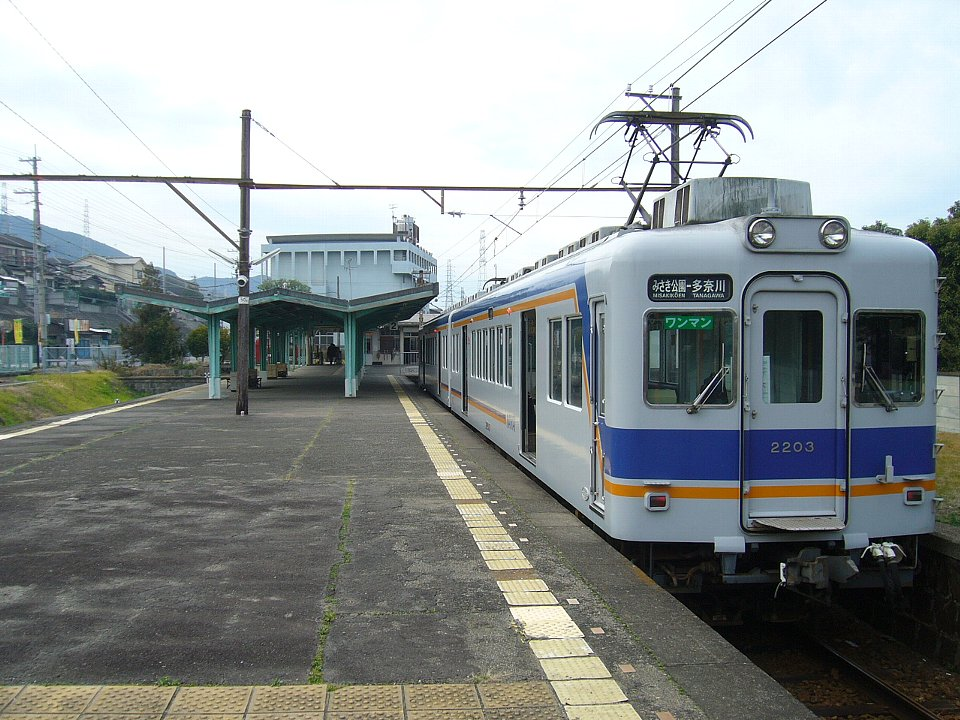
- Nankai 2200 series EMU at Tanagawa Station

Overview
- Native name: 多奈川線
- Locale: Osaka Prefecture
- Termini: Misaki-kōen; Tanagawa
- Stations: 4

Service
- Operator(s): Nankai Electric Railway Co., Ltd.

History
- Opened: 1 June 1944; 80 years ago
- Closed: 1966; 59 years ago (Ferry Line To Sumoto)

Technical
- Line length: 2.6 km (1.6 mi)
- Number of tracks: Single
- Track gauge: 1,067 mm (3 ft 6 in)
- Electrification: 1,500 V DC, overhead lines
- Operating speed: 45 km/h (28 mph)

The Tanagawa Line (多奈川線, Tanagawa-sen) is a railway line in Osaka Prefecture, Japan, owned by Nankai Electric Railway. This line connects to the Nankai Main Line.

== History ==
The line opened in 1944, electrified at 1500 VDC, to serve the Kawasaki Heavy Industries shipbuilding yard. In 1948 a ferry service connecting to Tokushima on Shikoku via Awaji Island commenced service, and an express service operated from Namba to Tanagawa as part of this service until 1993, the ferry service ceasing in 1998 upon the opening of the Akashi Kaikyo Bridge.

=== Former connecting lines ===
- Tanagawa station - A ferry to Sumoto on Awaji Island enabled connection to the Awaji Railway Co. 23km 1067mm gauge line to Fukura, where a ferry service to Naruto operated. The line opened between 1922 and 1925, was electrified at 600 VDC in 1947 and closed in 1966.

== Stations ==
No.	Station name	Distance (km)	Connecting Lines	Location
NK41	Misaki-kōen みさき公園	0.0	Nankai Main Line	Misaki, Osaka
NK41-1	Fukechō 深日町	1.4		Misaki, Osaka
NK41-2	Fukekō 深日港	2.1		Misaki, Osaka
NK41-3	Tanagawa 多奈川	2.6		Misaki, Osaka

== See also ==
- List of railway lines in Japan
