= Misaki Park =

Amusement park in Misaki, Osaka, Japan

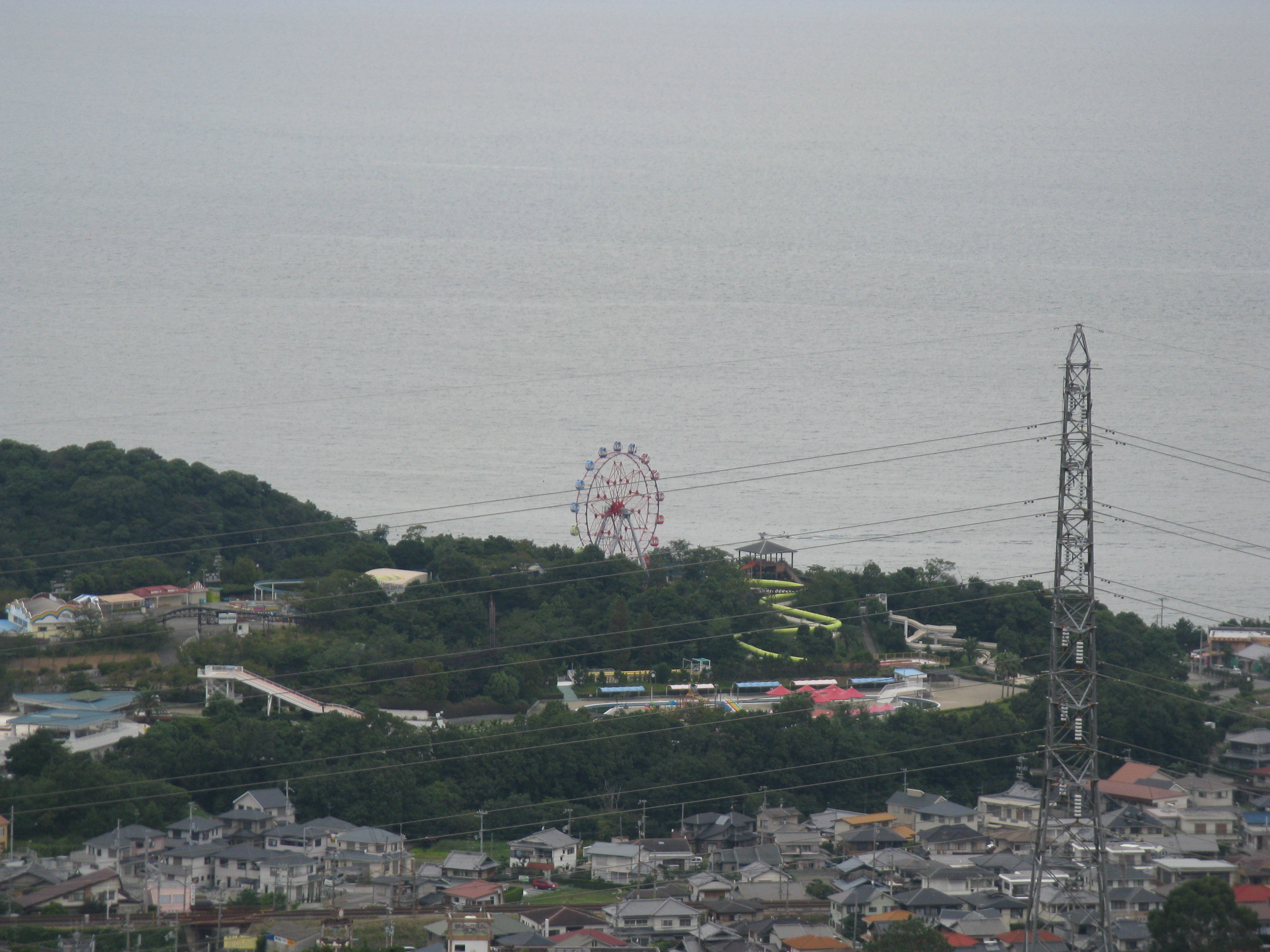
- Masaki Park in 2010
- Interactive map of Misaki Park
- Location: Misaki, Japan
- Coordinates: 34°19′40.95″N 135°9′40.18″E
- Opened: 1 April 1957
- Closed: 31 March 2020
- Owner: Nankai Electric Railway
- Operated by: Nankai Electric Railway
- General manager: Nankai Electric Railway
- Area: Misaki Town
- Website: http://www.howto-osaka.com/en/special/other/misakipark/ (English) http://www.nankai.co.jp/misaki/ (Japanese)

Misaki Park (みさき公園) was an amusement park located in the town of Misaki in Osaka Prefecture, Japan, operated by Nankai Electric Railway Co., Ltd. The park was opened on April 1, 1957, coinciding with the 70th anniversary of Nankai Railway.

The park's zoo and aquarium were closed on March 31, 2020, with the land and facilities transferred to the town of Misaki the following day. The town transformed the area into a nature park which opened on July 1, 2021.

== Park outline ==
The park consisted of an amusement park, a zoo, a dolphin show venue, and a large outdoor pool. The outdoor pool was opened only in summer.

The park was near Misaki-koen Station on the Nankai Main Line.

== Access ==
Misaki Park is located near Misaki-kōen Station, on Nankai Electric Railway's Nankai Main Line.
