= Tajiri, Osaka =

Tajiri 田尻町
- Town
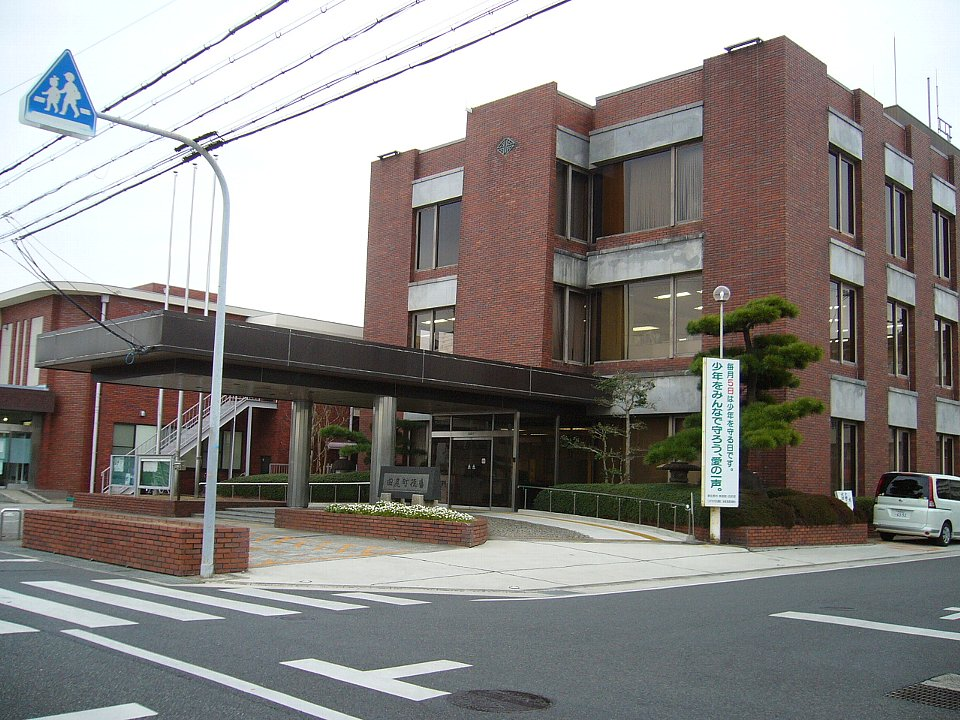
- Tajiri town office

- Flag Seal
- Location of Tajiri in Osaka Prefecture

- Location in Japan
- Coordinates: 34°24′N 135°17′E
- Country: Japan
- Region: Kansai; Kinki
- Prefecture: Osaka
- District: Sen'nan

Area
  - Total: 5.62 km^{2} (2.17 sq mi)

Population (January 1, 2022)
  - Total: 8,492
  - Density: 1,510/km^{2} (3,910/sq mi)
- Time zone: UTC+09:00 (JST)
- City hall address: 375-1 Kashoji, Tajiri-cho, Sennan-gun, Osaka-fu 598-8588
- Climate: Cfa
- Website: Official website

Tajiri (田尻町, Tajiri-chō) is a town located in Sennan District, Osaka Prefecture, Japan. As of 1 January 2022, the town had an estimated population of 8,492 in 4010 households and a population density of 1500 persons per km^{2}. The total area of the town is 5.62 square kilometres (2.17 sq mi).

== Geography ==
Tajiri is located at the southwestern tip of Osaka Prefecture, facing Osaka Bay. The central portion of Kansai International Airport (located on artificial island Kankūjima) is located within the town boundary. Not counting the area of the airport, Tajiri is the smallest town in Japan in terms of geographic area.

=== Neighboring municipalities ===
Osaka Prefecture

- Izumisano
- Sennan

=== Climate ===
Tajiri has a humid subtropical climate (Köppen Cfa) characterized by warm summers and cool winters with light to no snowfall. The average annual temperature in Tajiri is 17.0 °C (62.6 °F). The average annual rainfall is 1,220.3 mm (48.04 in) with October as the wettest month. The temperatures are highest on average in August, at around 28.3 °C (82.9 °F), and lowest in January, at around 6.6 °C (43.9 °F).

Climate data for Tajiri (2003−2020 normals, extremes 2003−present)
Month	Jan	Feb	Mar	Apr	May	Jun	Jul	Aug	Sep	Oct	Nov	Dec	Year
Record high °C (°F)	17.8 (64.0)	20.3 (68.5)	23.6 (74.5)	27.1 (80.8)	30.7 (87.3)	33.6 (92.5)	36.7 (98.1)	37.7 (99.9)	35.2 (95.4)	31.8 (89.2)	26.0 (78.8)	23.6 (74.5)	37.7 (99.9)
Mean daily maximum °C (°F)	9.3 (48.7)	9.9 (49.8)	13.2 (55.8)	18.4 (65.1)	23.4 (74.1)	26.7 (80.1)	30.3 (86.5)	32.4 (90.3)	28.6 (83.5)	23.0 (73.4)	17.5 (63.5)	12.0 (53.6)	20.4 (68.7)
Daily mean °C (°F)	6.6 (43.9)	6.9 (44.4)	9.5 (49.1)	14.3 (57.7)	19.1 (66.4)	22.8 (73.0)	26.6 (79.9)	28.3 (82.9)	25.2 (77.4)	19.9 (67.8)	14.8 (58.6)	9.4 (48.9)	17.0 (62.5)
Mean daily minimum °C (°F)	4.0 (39.2)	3.9 (39.0)	6.2 (43.2)	10.7 (51.3)	15.6 (60.1)	20.0 (68.0)	24.1 (75.4)	25.6 (78.1)	22.5 (72.5)	17.1 (62.8)	11.9 (53.4)	6.7 (44.1)	14.0 (57.3)
Record low °C (°F)	−3.3 (26.1)	−1.4 (29.5)	1.0 (33.8)	3.8 (38.8)	8.9 (48.0)	14.8 (58.6)	19.5 (67.1)	21.0 (69.8)	15.9 (60.6)	10.4 (50.7)	4.9 (40.8)	0.3 (32.5)	−3.3 (26.1)
Average precipitation mm (inches)	39.9 (1.57)	58.1 (2.29)	90.2 (3.55)	82.7 (3.26)	122.1 (4.81)	148.4 (5.84)	168.1 (6.62)	92.8 (3.65)	130.7 (5.15)	153.3 (6.04)	74.0 (2.91)	60.1 (2.37)	1,220.3 (48.04)
Average precipitation days (≥ 1.0 mm)	4.7	7.0	8.7	8.8	8.5	10.4	10.1	5.7	8.9	8.4	6.2	5.9	93.3
Source: Japan Meteorological Agency

=== Demographics ===
Per Japanese census data, the population of Tajiri has been fluctuating over the past 50 years.

Historical population
Year	Pop.	±%
1920	3,244	—
1930	4,387	+35.2%
1940	4,663	+6.3%
1950	6,179	+32.5%
1960	8,204	+32.8%
1970	8,382	+2.2%
1980	7,519	−10.3%
1990	6,540	−13.0%
2000	6,785	+3.7%
2010	8,084	+19.1%

== History ==
The area of the modern town of Tajiri was within ancient Izumi Province. During the Edo Period, the area was divided between the holdings of Kishiwada Domain and Mikami Domain. The village of Tajiri was established within Hine District of Osaka Prefecture with the creation of the modern municipalities system on April 1, 1889. On April 1, 1896, the area became part of Sennan District, Osaka. Tajiri was raised to town status on May 3, 1953

== Government ==
Tajiri has a mayor-council form of government with a directly elected mayor and a unicameral city council of 10 members. Tajiri collectively with the cities of Kaizuka, Sennan, and Hannan contributes two members to the Osaka Prefectural Assembly. In terms of national politics, the town is part of Osaka 19th district of the lower house of the Diet of Japan.

== Economy ==
The economy of Tajiri is centered on commercial fishing, agriculture and textiles. Due to the proximity to Kansai International Airport, aviation-related support industries are also located in the town. At one time Peach Aviation had its headquarters in a location that was on the airport property and in the town.

== Education ==
Tajiri has one public elementary school and one public middle school operated by the town government. The town does not have a high school.

== Transportation ==
=== Railway ===
Nankai Electric Railway - Nankai Main Line

- Yoshiminosato

Nankai Electric Railway - Nankai Airport Line

- Kansai Airport

JR West – Kansai Airport Line

- Kansai Airport

=== Highway ===
- National Route 26

== Local attractions ==
- Tajiri Historic House

== Gallery ==
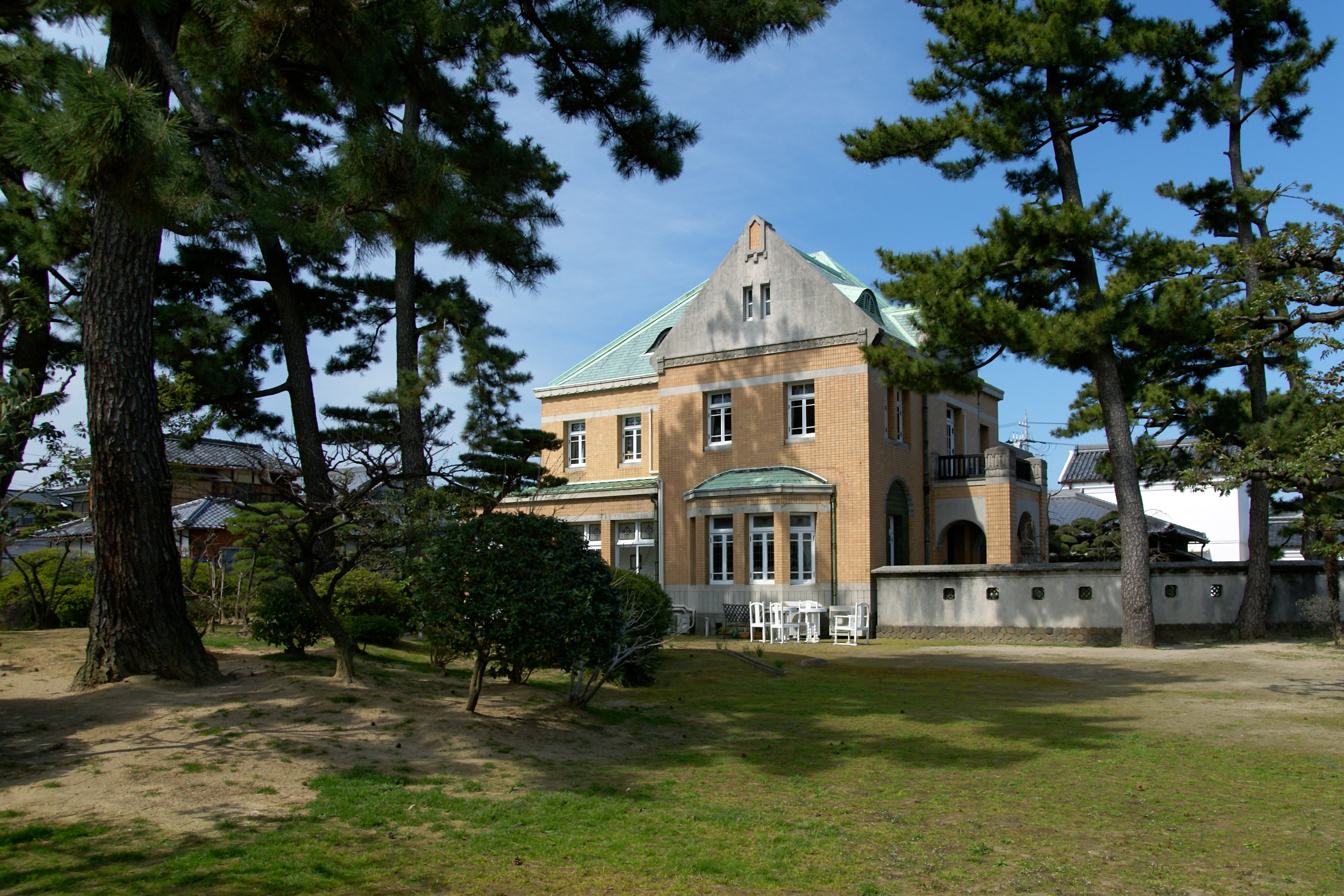
Tajiri Historic House

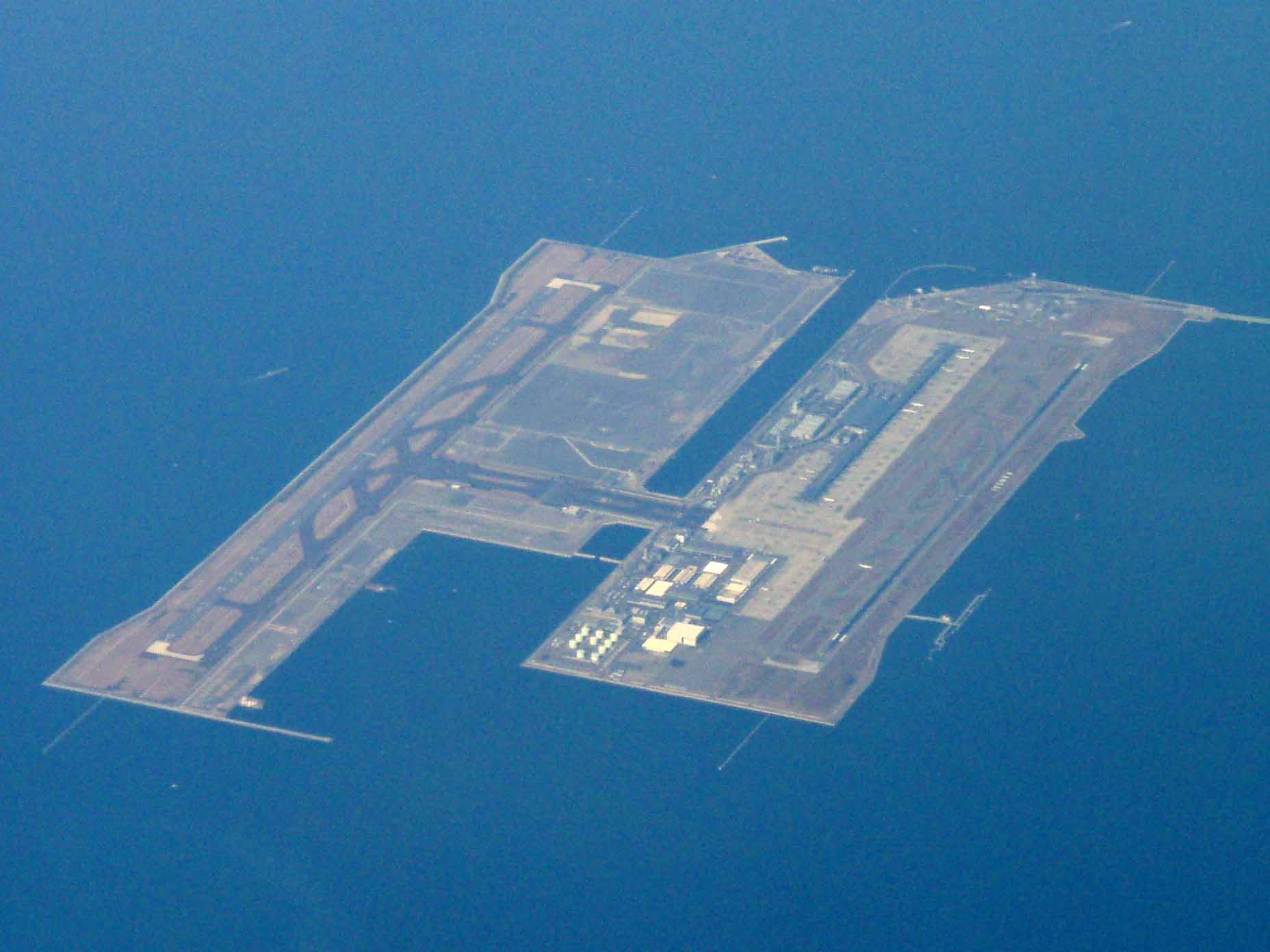
Kansai International Airport
