= Higashi-Sano Station =

Railway station in Izumisano, Osaka Prefecture, Japan

Higashi-Sano Station 東佐野駅
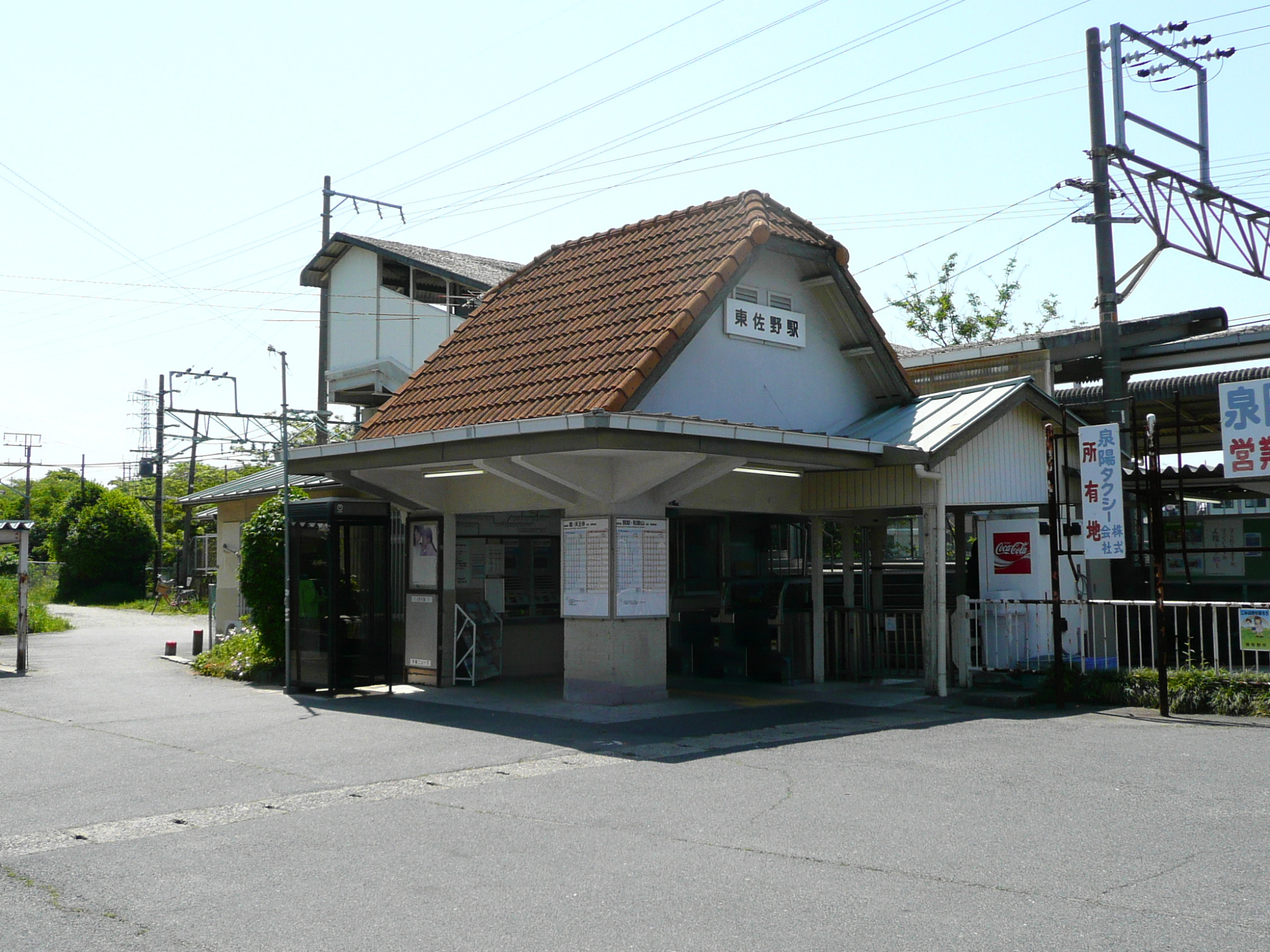
- Higashi-Sano Station, May 2008

General information
- Location: 1-1 Izumigaoka, Izumisano-shi, Osaka-fu 598-0072; Japan
- Coordinates: 34.4165°N 135.3502°E
- System: JR-West commuter rail station
- Owner: West Japan Railway Company
- Operator: West Japan Railway Company
- Line: R Hanwa Line
- Distance: 31.5 km (19.6 miles) from Tennōji
- Platforms: 2 side platforms
- Tracks: 2
- Train operators: West Japan Railway Company

Construction
- Structure type: At grade

Other information
- Status: Staffed
- Station code: JR-R43
- Website: Official website

History
- Opened: 9 January 1939
- Former names: Izumigaoka (to 1944)

Passengers
- FY2019: 1278 daily
Services
Preceding station	JR-West	Following station
Hanwa Line
Izumi-Hashimoto	Local	Kumatori
Izumi-Hashimoto	Regional Rapid Service	Kumatori
Direct Rapid Service: Does not stop at this station
Rapid Service: Does not stop at this station
Kansai Airport Rapid Service: Does not stop at this station
Kishuji Rapid Service: Does not stop at this station
Limited Express Kuroshio: Does not stop at this station
Limited Express Haruka: Does not stop at this station
|}
Location
- Location within Osaka Prefecture Location within Japan

Higashi-Sano Station (東佐野駅, Higashi-Sano-eki) is a passenger railway station in located in the city of Izumisano, Osaka Prefecture, Japan, operated by West Japan Railway Company (JR West).

== Lines ==
Higashi-Sano Station is served by the Hanwa Line, and is located 31.5 kilometres (19.6 miles) from the northern terminus of the line at Tennōji.

== Station layout ==
The station consists of two opposed side platforms connected to the station building by a footbridge. The station is staffed.

=== Platforms ===
1	■ R Hanwa Line	for Kansai Airport and Wakayama
2	■ R Hanwa Line	for Tennōji

== History ==
Higashi-Sano Station opened on 9 January 1939 as Izumigaoka Station (泉ヶ丘駅). It was renamed to its present name on 1 May 1944. With the privatization of the Japan National Railways (JNR) on 1 April 1987, the station came under the aegis of the West Japan Railway Company.

Station numbering was introduced in March 2018 with Higashi-Sano being assigned station number JR-R43.

== Passenger statistics ==
In fiscal 2019, the station was used by an average of 1278 passengers daily (boarding passengers only).

== Surrounding area ==
- Izumigaoka residential area

== See also ==
- List of railway stations in Japan
