= Misaki, Osaka =

Misaki 岬町
- Town
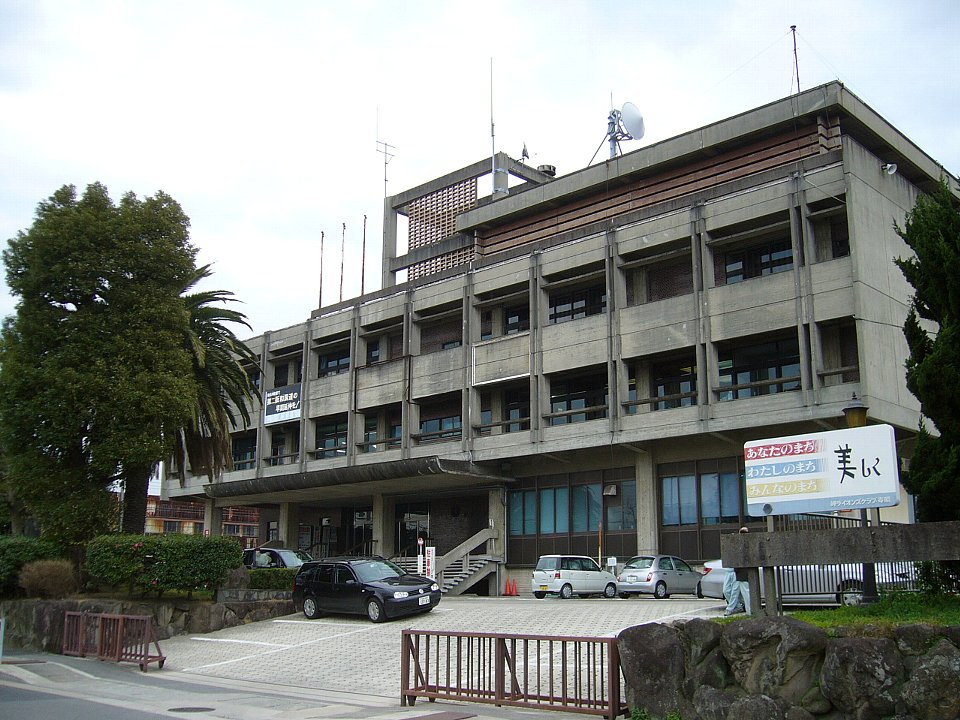
- Misaki town office

- Flag Emblem
- Interactive map of Misaki
- Location in Japan
- Coordinates: 34°19′N 135°9′E
- Country: Japan
- Region: Kansai; Kinki
- Prefecture: Osaka
- District: Sen'nan

Area
  - Total: 49.18 km^{2} (18.99 sq mi)

Population (January 1, 2022)
  - Total: 15,035
  - Density: 305.7/km^{2} (791.8/sq mi)
- Time zone: UTC+09:00 (JST)
- City hall address: Fuke, Misaki-cho, Sennan-gun, Osaka-fu 599-0392
- Website: Official website
- Symbols
- Flower: Rhododendron
- Tree: Pine

Misaki (岬町, Misaki-chō) is a town located in Sen'nan District, Osaka Prefecture, Japan. As of 1 January 2022, the town had an estimated population of 15,035 in 7435 households and a population density of 310 persons per km^{2}. The total area of the town is 49.18 square kilometres (18.99 sq mi).

== Geography ==
Misaki is located at the southwestern tip of Osaka Prefecture, with the Izumi Mountains and Wakayama Prefecture to the south, and Osaka Bay to the north.

=== Neighboring municipalities ===
Osaka Prefecture

- Hannan

Wakayama Prefecture

- Wakayama

== Climate ==
Misaki has a humid subtropical climate (Köppen Cfa) characterized by warm summers and cool winters with light to no snowfall. The average annual temperature in Misaki is 15.9 °C. The average annual rainfall is 1713 mm with September as the wettest month. The temperatures are highest on average in August, at around 25.7 °C, and lowest in January, at around 5.7 °C.

== Demographics ==
Per Japanese census data, the population of Misaki has been decreasing over the past 40 years.

Historical population
Year	Pop.	±%
1920	9,497	—
1930	10,368	+9.2%
1940	12,671	+22.2%
1950	18,463	+45.7%
1960	19,133	+3.6%
1970	20,684	+8.1%
1980	22,864	+10.5%
1990	21,560	−5.7%
2000	19,789	−8.2%
2010	17,509	−11.5%

== History ==
The area of the modern town of Misaki was within ancient Izumi Province and has many Kofun period burial mounds. During the Edo Period, the area was an exclave of Tsuchiura Domain of Hitachi Province. The villages of Tannowa, Kyōshi, Fuke and Tanagawa were established within Hine District with the creation of the modern municipalities system on April 1, 1889. On April 1, 1896, the area became part of Sennan District, Osaka. The Nankai Railway connected Fuke to Nanba in Osaka from March 21, 1903. Fuke was elevated to town status on February 11, 1943, followed by Tanagawa on March 10, 1943. On April 1, 1955, Fuke, Tanagawa, Tannowa and Kyōshi were merged to form the town of Misaki. Misaki entered into discussions to merge with either Sennan and Hannan, or with Sennan, Hannan, Izumisano and Tajiri to form the city of "Sennanshu" (南泉州市) from 2001 to 2004; however, per a public referendum, only Misaki was in favor of the merger and plans for a merger were abandoned.

== Government ==
Misaki has a mayor-council form of government with a directly elected mayor and a unicameral city council of 12 members. Misaki collectively with the cities of Kaizuka, Sennan, and Hannan contributes two members to the Osaka Prefectural Assembly. In terms of national politics, the town is part of Osaka 19th district of the lower house of the Diet of Japan.

== Economy ==
The economy of Misaki is centered on commercial fishing, agriculture and forestry. The town is famous for its production of clay roof tiles.

== Education ==
Misaki has three public elementary schools and one public middle school operated by the town government, and one public high school operated by the Osaka Prefectural Board of Education.

== Transportation ==
=== Railway ===
Nankai Electric Railway - Nankai Main Line

- Tannowa - Misaki-kōen - Kyōshi

Nankai Electric Railway - Nankai Tanagawa Line

- Misaki-kōen - Fukechō - Fukekō - Tanagawa

=== Highway ===
- National Route 26

== Local attractions ==
- Misaki Park, amusement park
- Saryō Kofun, Kofun period tumulus, National Historic Site
