= Tanagawa Station =

Railway station in Misaki, Osaka Prefecture, Japan

Tanagawa Station 多奈川駅
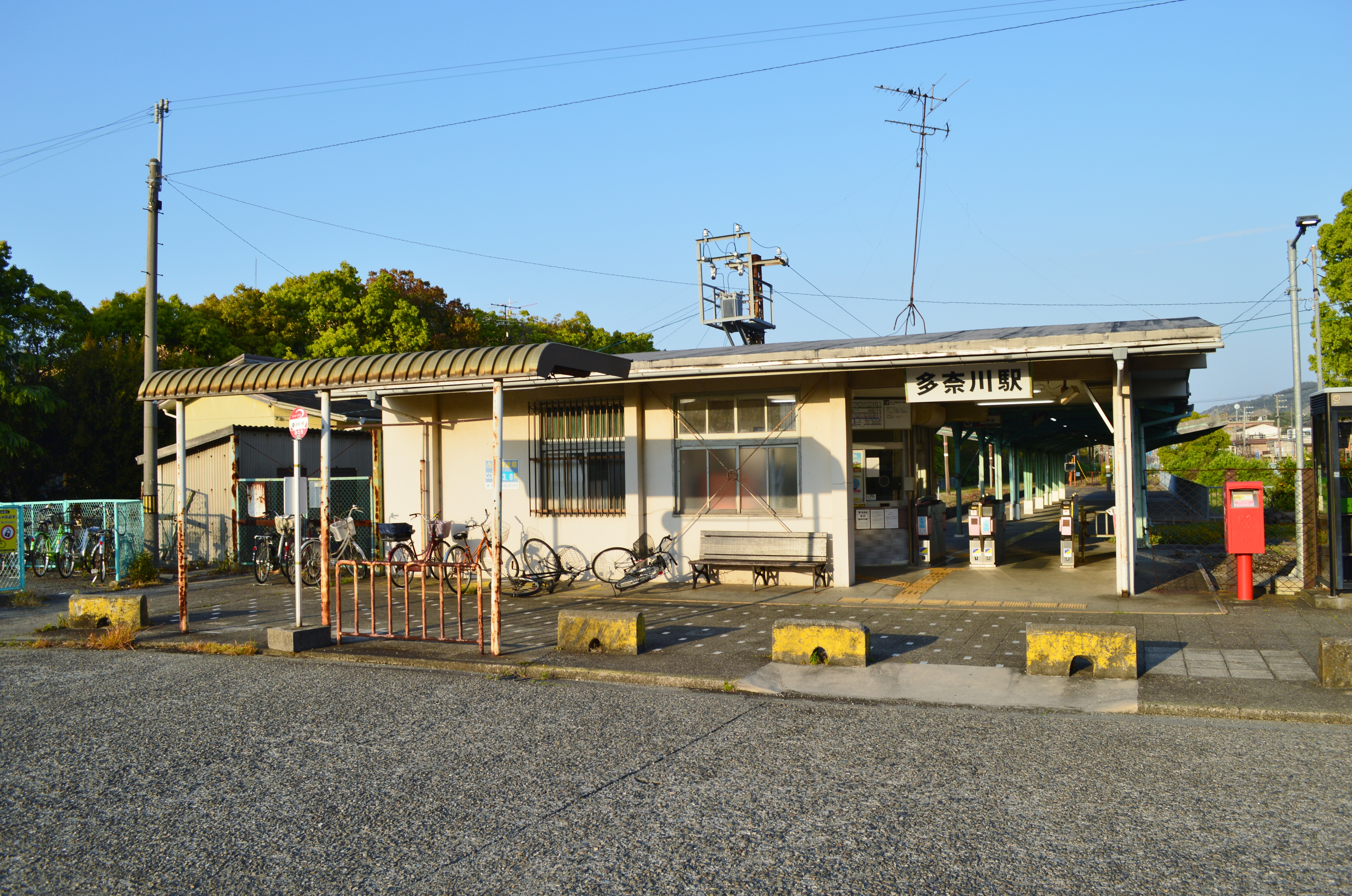
- Tanagawa Station, June 2020

General information
- Location: 2290, Tanagawa Tanigawa, Misaki-cho, Sennan-gun, Osaka-fu 599-0311; Japan
- Coordinates: 34°19′00″N 135°08′12″E
- Operator: Nankai Electric Railway
- Line: Tanagawa Line
- Distance: 2.6 km from Misaki-kōen
- Platforms: 1 island platform
- Connections: Bus stop

Other information
- Station code: NK41-3
- Website: Official website

History
- Opened: June 1, 1944

Passengers
- 2019: 602 daily

Services
Preceding station	Nankai Electric Railway	Following station
Fukekō towards Misaki-kōen	Tanagawa Line	Terminus
Location
- Location within Osaka Prefecture Location within Japan

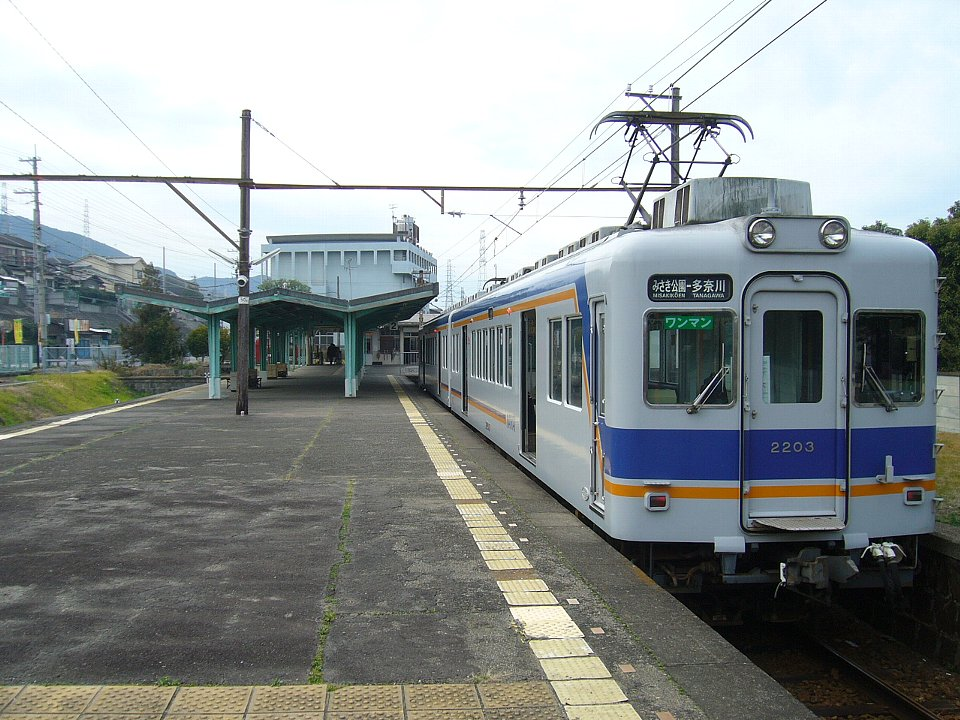
Tanagawa Station platform with a Nankai 2200 series train waiting to depart

Tanagawa Station (多奈川駅, Tanagawa-eki) is a passenger railway station located in the town of Misaki, Sennan District, Osaka Prefecture, Japan, operated by the private railway operator Nankai Electric Railway. It has the station number "NK41-3".

== Lines ==
Tanagawa Station is the terminus of the Tanagawa Line, and is 2.6 kilometers from the opposing terminus of the line at Misaki-kōen.

== Layout ==
The station consists of a single dead-headed island platform, of which only one side is in use.

== History ==
Tanagawa Station opened on June 1, 1944.

== Passenger statistics ==
In fiscal 2019, the station was used by an average of 602 passengers daily.

== Surrounding area ==
- Misaki Municipal Cultural Center.

== See also ==
- List of railway stations in Japan
