= Osaka University of Tourism =

Easy

Coordinates: 34°23′34.9″N 135°20′22.7″E

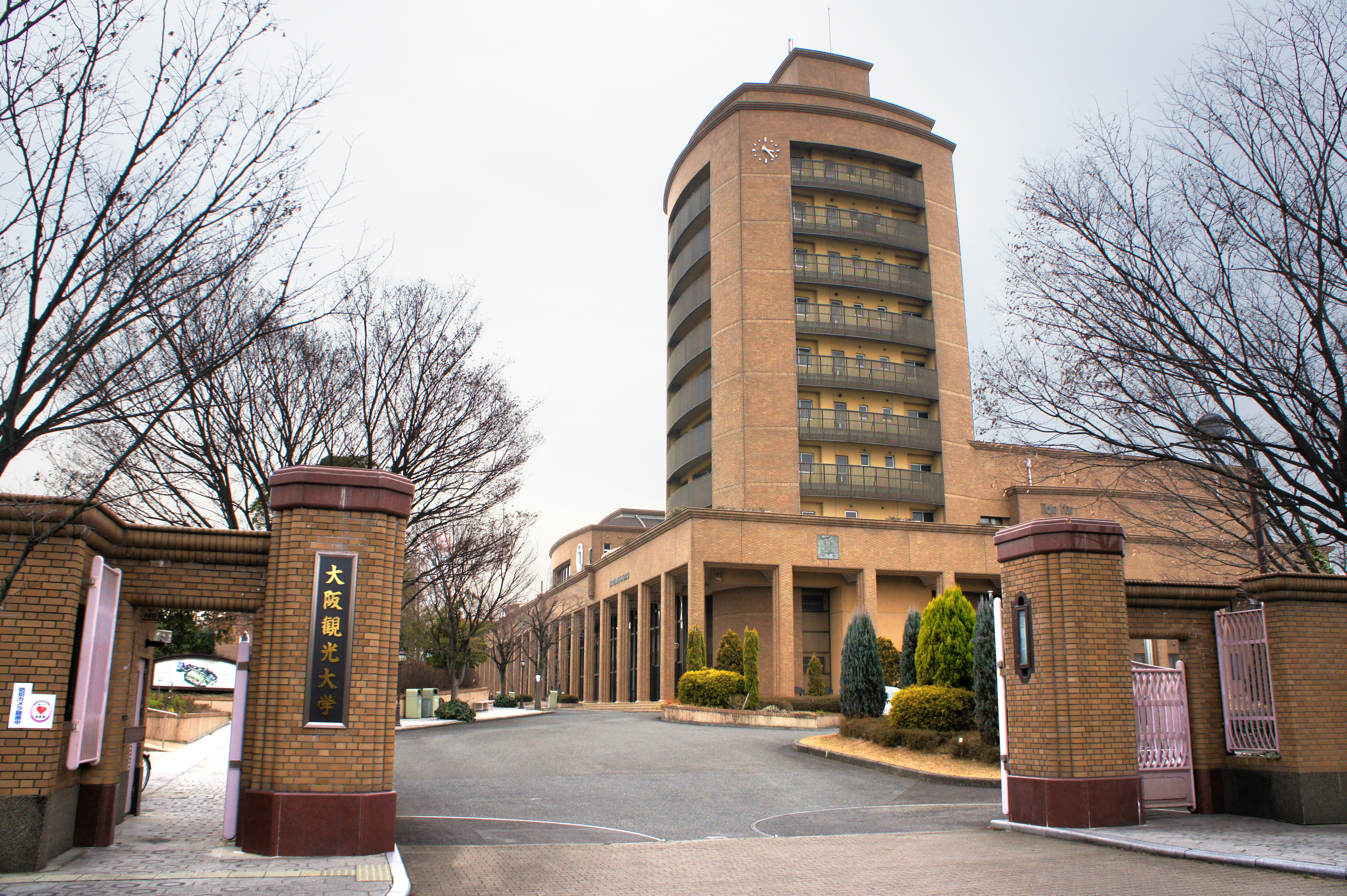
Osaka University of Tourism

Osaka University of Tourism (大阪観光大学, Ōsaka kankō daigaku) is a private university in the town of Kumatori in Osaka Prefecture, Japan. The predecessor of the school was founded in 1920, and it was chartered as a junior women's college in 1985. In 2000 it became a co-ed four-year college. The present name of the school was adopted in 2006.
