= Misaki-kōen Station (Osaka) =

Railway station in Misaki, Osaka Prefecture, Japan

Misaki-kōen Station みさき公園駅
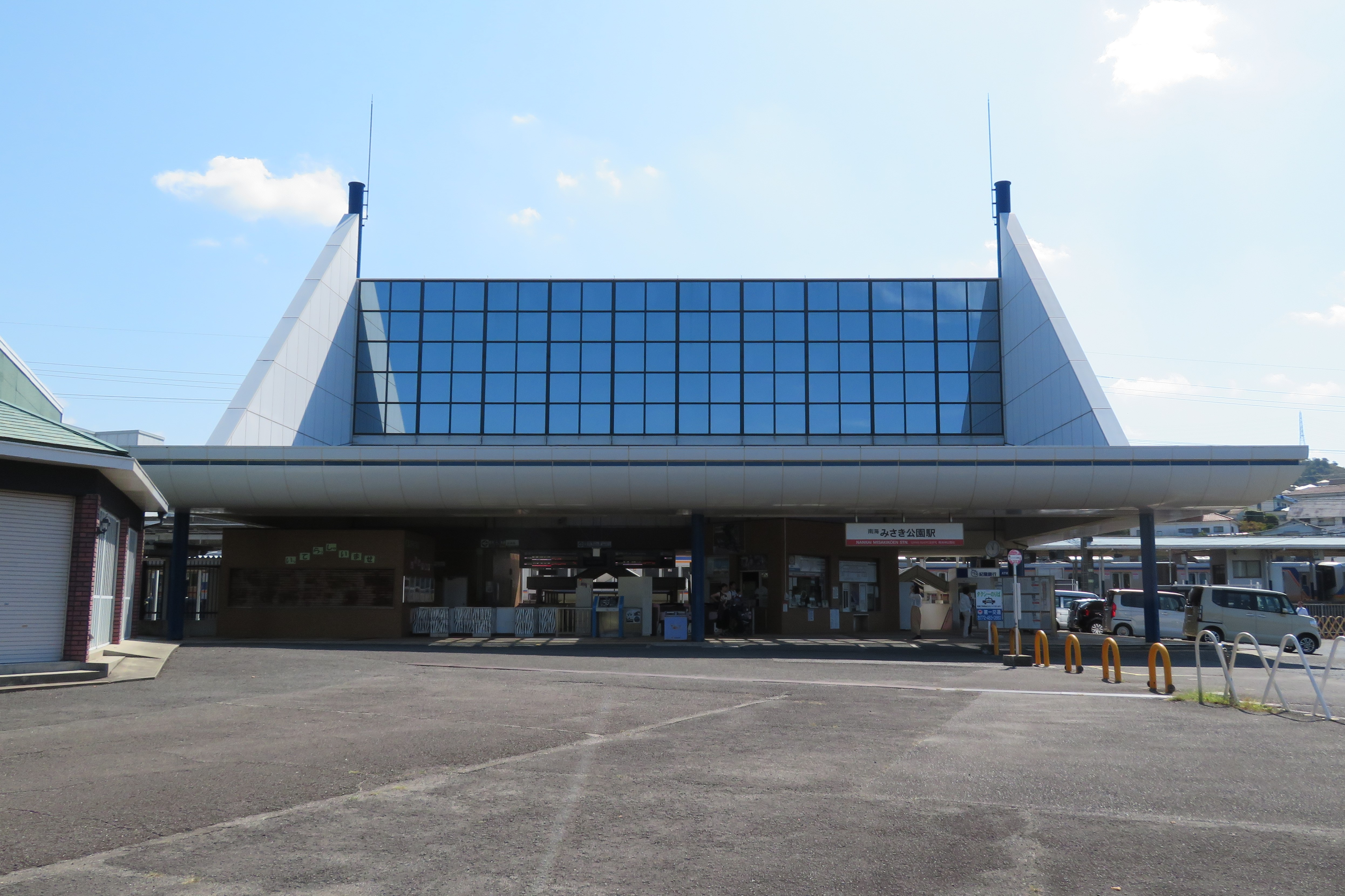
- Misaki-kōen Station building in October 2019

General information
- Location: 3714, Tannowa, Misaki-cho, Sennan-gun, Osaka-fu 599-0301; Japan
- Coordinates: 34°19′25″N 135°09′37″E
- Operator: Nankai Electric Railway
- Lines: Nankai Main Line; Tanagawa Line
- Platforms: 2 island platforms, 1 bay platform
- Connections: Bus stop

Construction
- Parking: Yes

Other information
- Station code: NK41
- Website: Official website

History
- Opened: 23 July 1938; 88 years ago
- Rebuilt: 1 June 1944; 82 years ago
- Former names: Minami-Tannowa (until 1957)

Passengers
- FY2019: 4685 daily

Services
Preceding station	Nankai Electric Railway	Following station
Tannowa NK40 towards Namba	Nankai Main Line Local Sub. Express	Kyōshi NK42 towards Wakayamashi
Ozaki NK37 towards Namba	Nankai Main Line Express	Wakayamadaigakumae NK43 towards Wakayamashi
Ozaki NK37 towards Namba	Southern	Wakayamadaigakumae NK43 towards Wakayamashi or Wakayamakō
Terminus	Tanagawa Line	Fukechō NK41-1 towards Tanagawa
Location
- Location within Osaka Prefecture Location within Japan

Misaki-kōen Station (みさき公園駅, Misaki-kōen-eki) is a junction passenger railway station located in the town of Misaki, Osaka Prefecture, Japan, operated by the private railway operator Nankai Electric Railway. The station is the nearest station to Misaki Park, a now-shuttered amusement park run Nankai. It has the station number "NK41".

== Lines ==
Misaki-kōen Station is served by the Nankai Main Line and is 51.9 kilometers (32.2 mi) from the terminus of the line at Namba. It is also the terminus of the 2.8 kilometer Tanagawa Line to Tanagawa.

== Layout ==
The station has two island platforms serving five tracks on an embankment. Track 4 is located in the south part of the northbound platform serving tracks 3 and 5.

=== Tracks ===
1	■ Nankai Line	for Wakayamashi returning for Namba (Local, Sub. Express); Change to the Airport Line at Izumisano for Kansai Airport
2	■ Nankai Line	for Wakayamashi
3	■ Nankai Line	for Namba; Change to the Airport Line at Izumisano for Kansai Airport
4	■ Tanagawa Line	for Tanagawa (one train every day)
5	■ Tanagawa Line	for Tanagawa

== History ==
Misaki-kōen Station opened on 23 July 1938 as Minami-Tannowa Station (南淡輪駅). It was renamed to its present name on 1 January 1957, three months before the opening of the former Misaki Park.

== Passenger statistics ==
In fiscal 2019, the station was used by an average of 4685 passengers daily.

== Surrounding area ==
- Misaki Park
- Osaka Golf Club
- Misaki Post Office
- Sairyo Tomb
- Shiratoyama Tomb
- Mnanabeyama Tomb

== See also ==
- List of railway stations in Japan
