= Sennan District, Osaka =

District in Ōsaka prefecture, Japan

Coordinates: 34.314°N 135.151°E

Location of Sennan District in Osaka

Sennan (泉南郡, Sennan-gun) is a district located in Osaka Prefecture, Japan.

== Population ==
As of 2009, the district has an estimated population of 70,631 and a density of 991 persons per km^{2}. The total area is 71.27 km^{2}.

== Economy ==
At one time Peach Aviation had its head office in a location on the property of Kansai International Airport and in Tajiri, in Sennan District.

== Towns ==
- Kumatori
- Misaki
- Tajiri
