= Iharanosato Station =

Railway station in Izumisano, Osaka Prefecture, Japan

Iharanosato Station 井原里駅
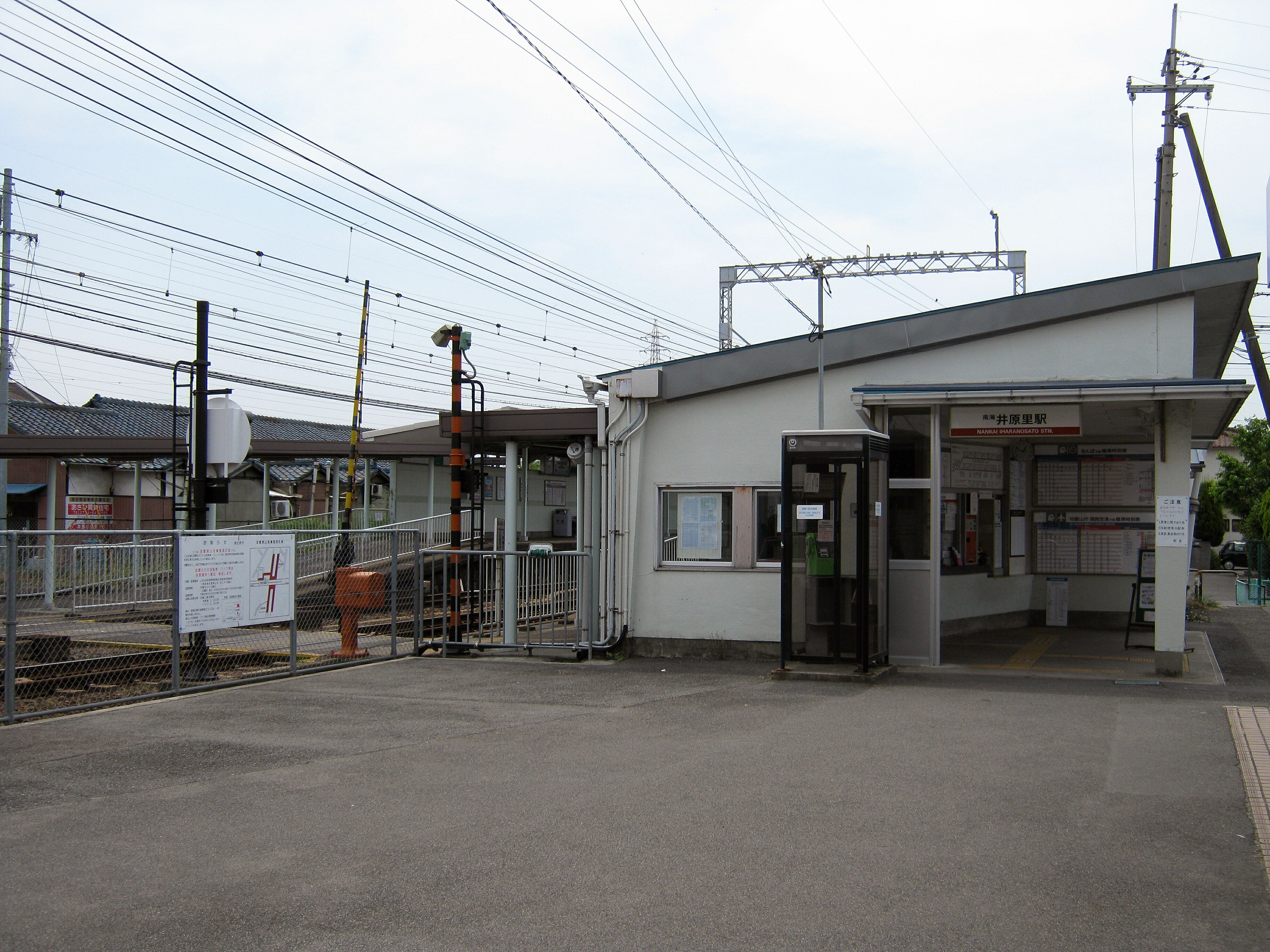
- Iharanosato Station in May 2009

General information
- Location: 1-57, Shimokawaraya 1-chome, Izumisano-shi, Osaka-fu 598-0062; Japan
- Coordinates: 34°25′11″N 135°19′51″E
- Operator: Nankai Electric Railway
- Line: Nankai Main Line
- Distance: 32.4 km from Namba
- Platforms: 2 side platforms

Other information
- Station code: NK29
- Website: Official website

History
- Opened: 1 April 1952; 74 years ago

Passengers
- 2019: 1542 daily
Location
- Location within Osaka Prefecture Location within Japan

Iharanosato Station (井原里駅, Iharanosato-eki) is a passenger railway station located in the city of Izumisano, Osaka Prefecture, Japan, operated by the private railway operator Nankai Electric Railway. It has the station number "NK29".

== Lines ==
Iharanosato Station is served by the Nankai Main Line, and is 32.4 kilometers (20.1 mi) from the terminus of the line at Nanba.

== Layout ==
The station consists of two opposed side platforms connected by a level crossing.

=== Platforms ===
1	■ Nankai Main Line	for Wakayamashi and Kansai Airport
2	■ Nankai Main Line	for Namba

== Adjacent stations ==
«	Service	»
Nankai Main Line
Limited Express "rapi:t α" for Kansai Airport (特急ラピートα): Does not stop at this station
Limited Express "rapi:t β" (特急ラピートβ): Does not stop at this station
Limited Express "Southern" (特急サザン): Does not stop at this station
Limited Express without seat reservations (自由席特急): Does not stop at this station
Express (急行): Does not stop at this station
Airport Express (空港急行): Does not stop at this station
Sub. Express (区間急行): Does not stop at this station
Tsuruhara	Semi-Express for Namba (準急, in the morning on weekdays)	Izumisano
Tsuruhara	Local (普通車)	Izumisano

== History ==
Iharanosato Station opened on 1 April 1952.

== Passenger statistics ==
In fiscal 2019, the station was used by an average of 1542 passengers daily.

== Surrounding area ==
- Osaka Prefectural Road No. 20
- Icora Mall Izumisano

== See also ==
- List of railway stations in Japan
