= Sakai =

Designated city in Kansai, Japan

Sakai 堺市
- Designated city
- Sakai City
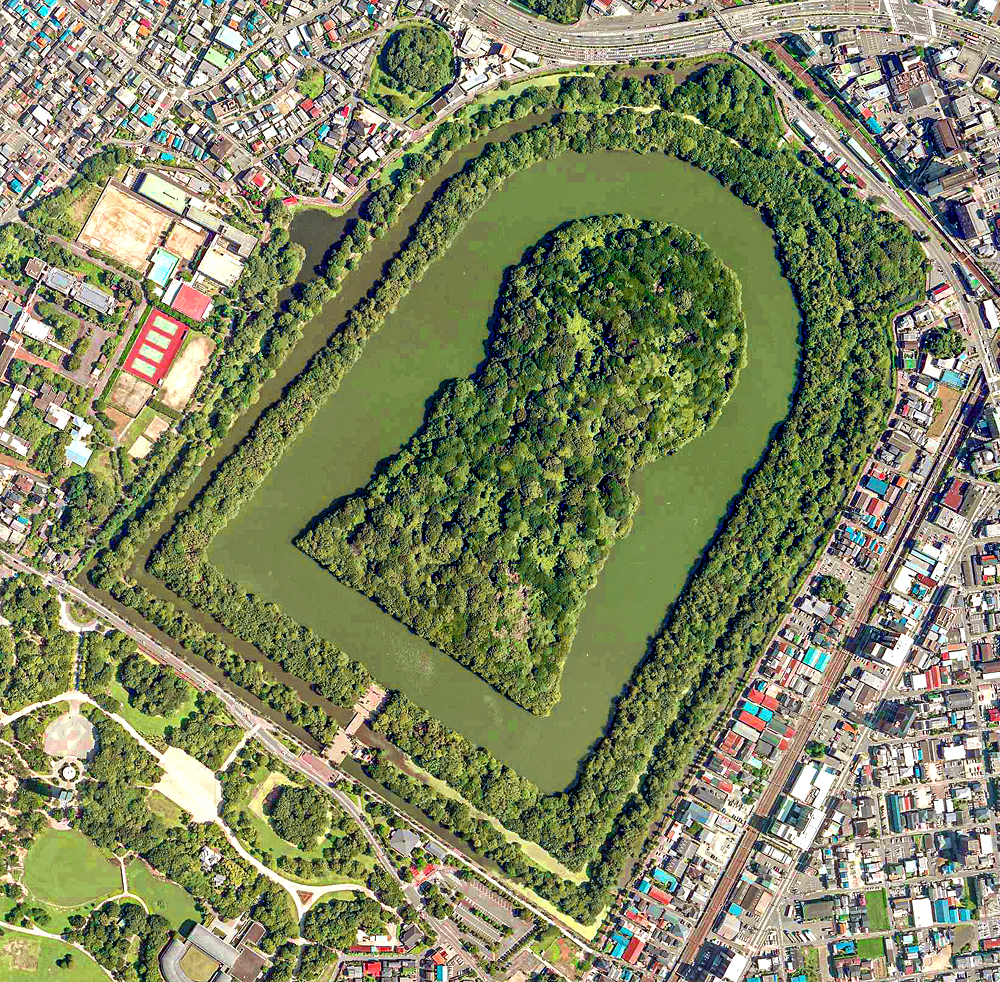
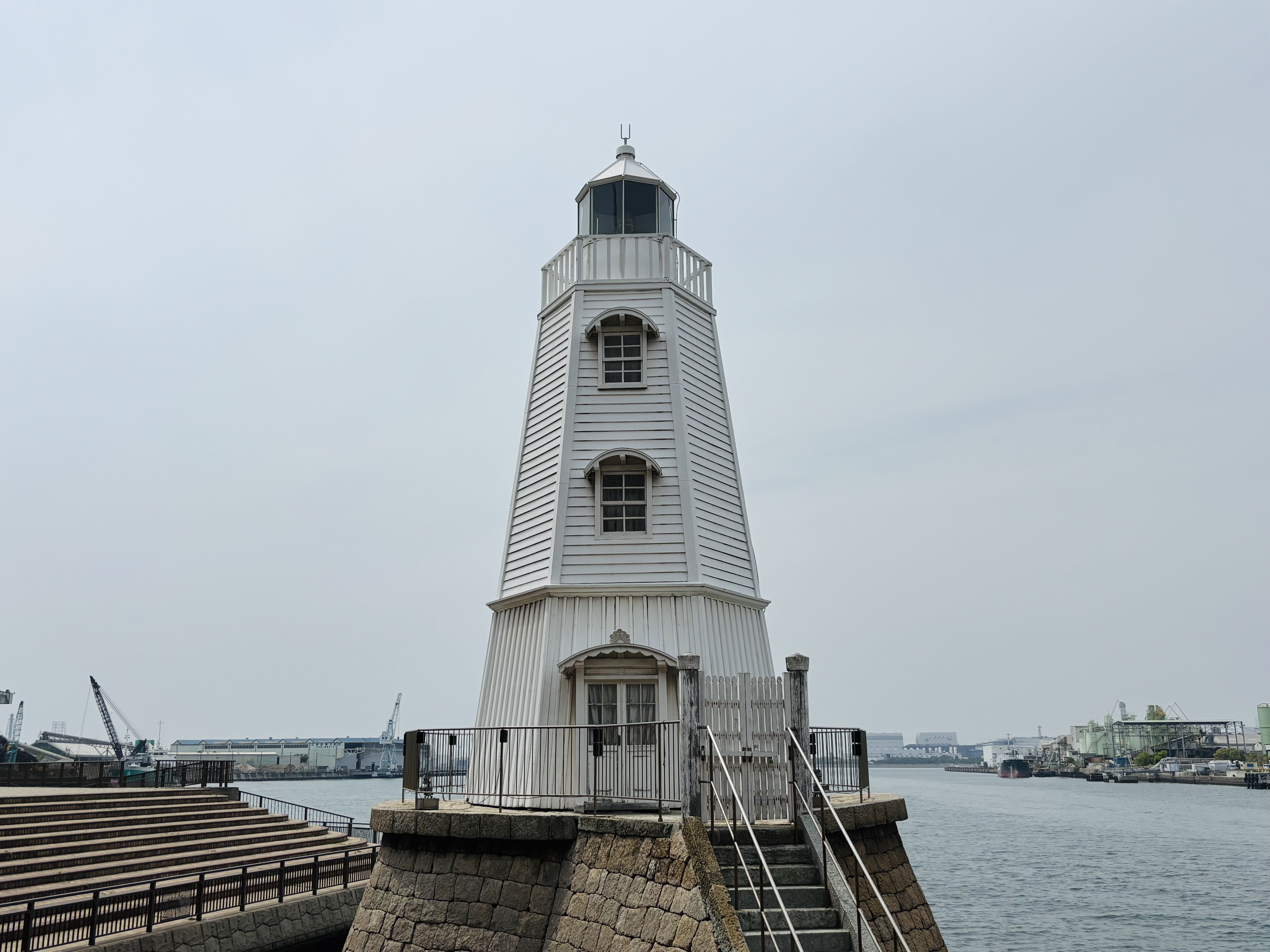
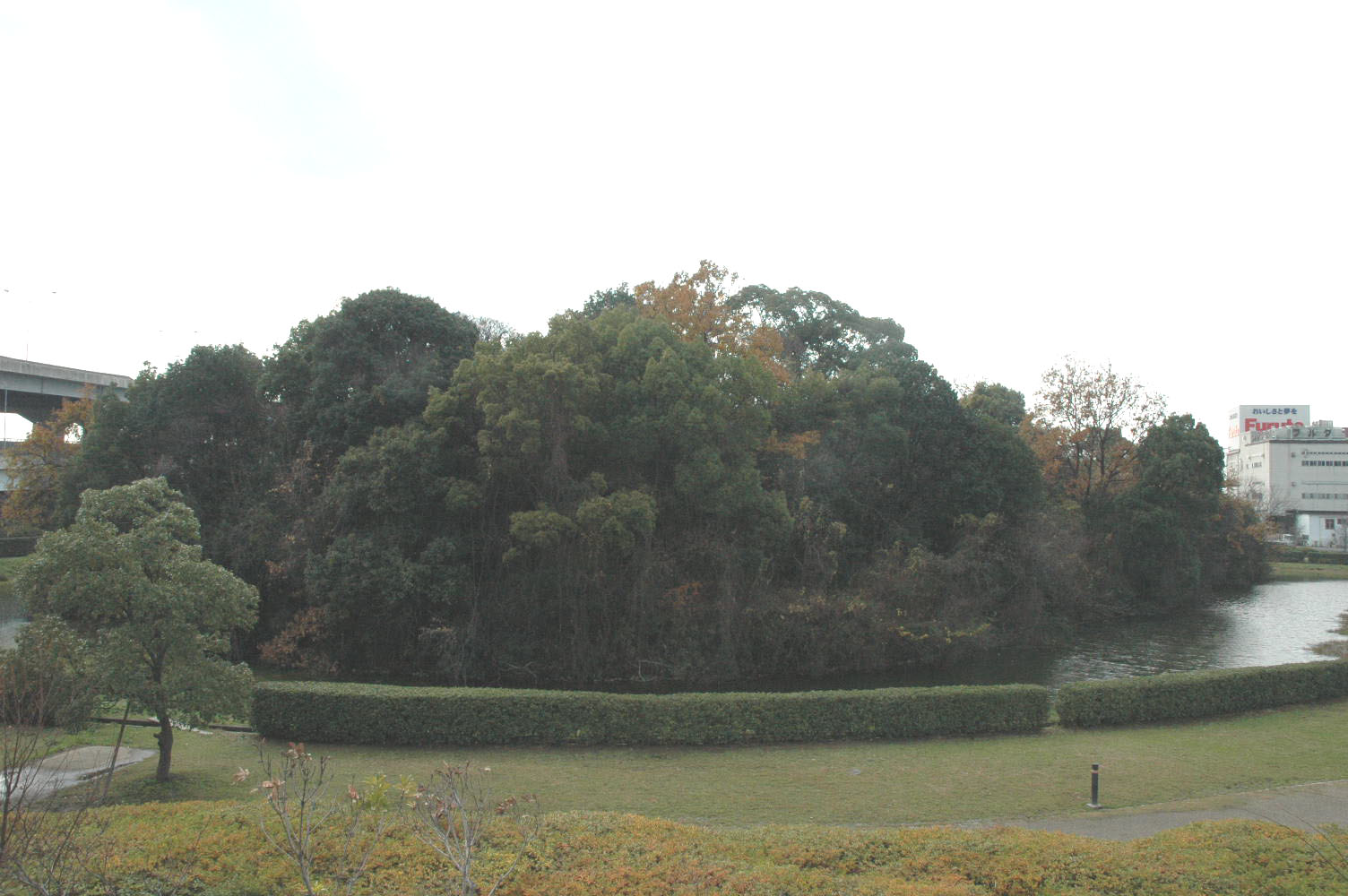
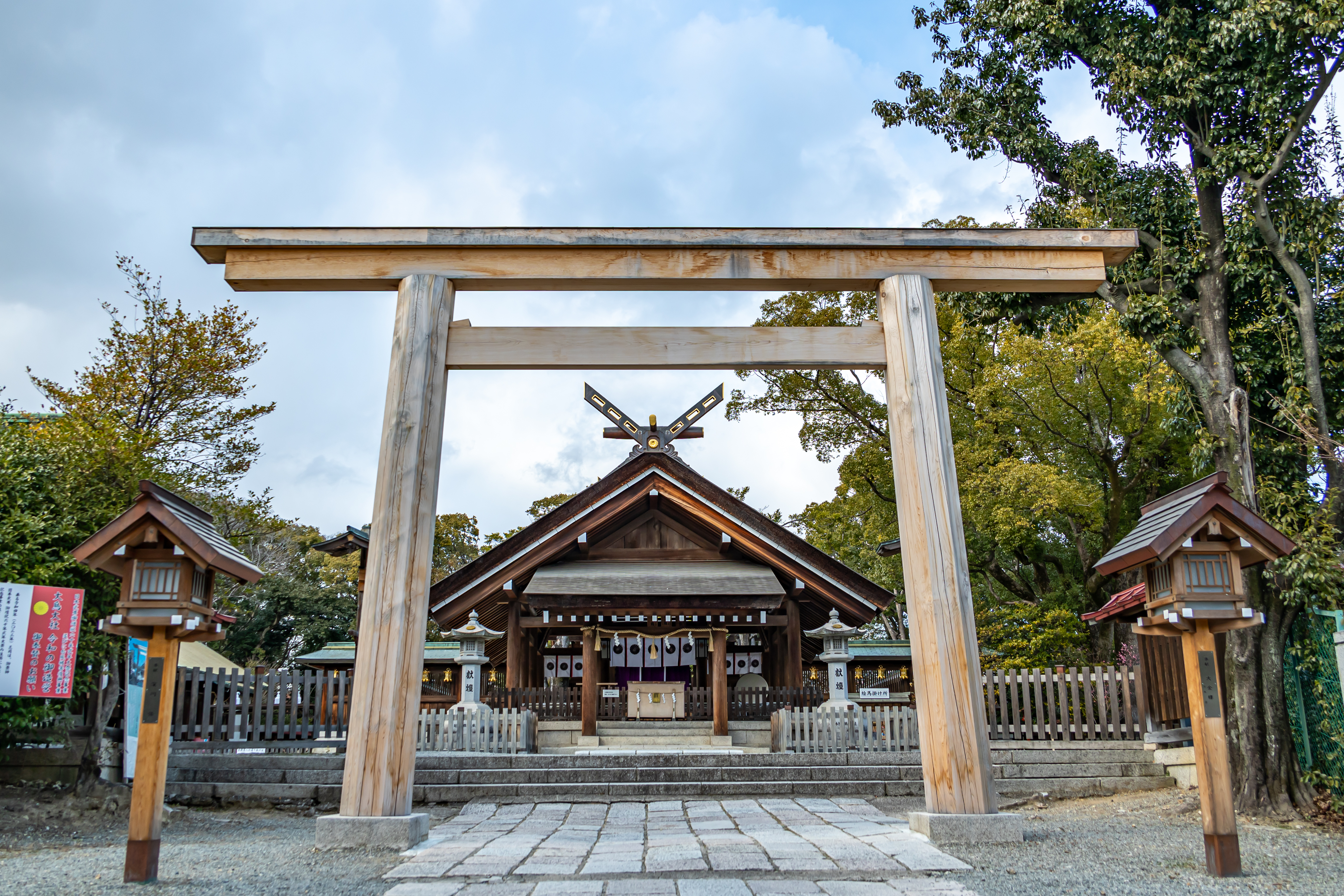
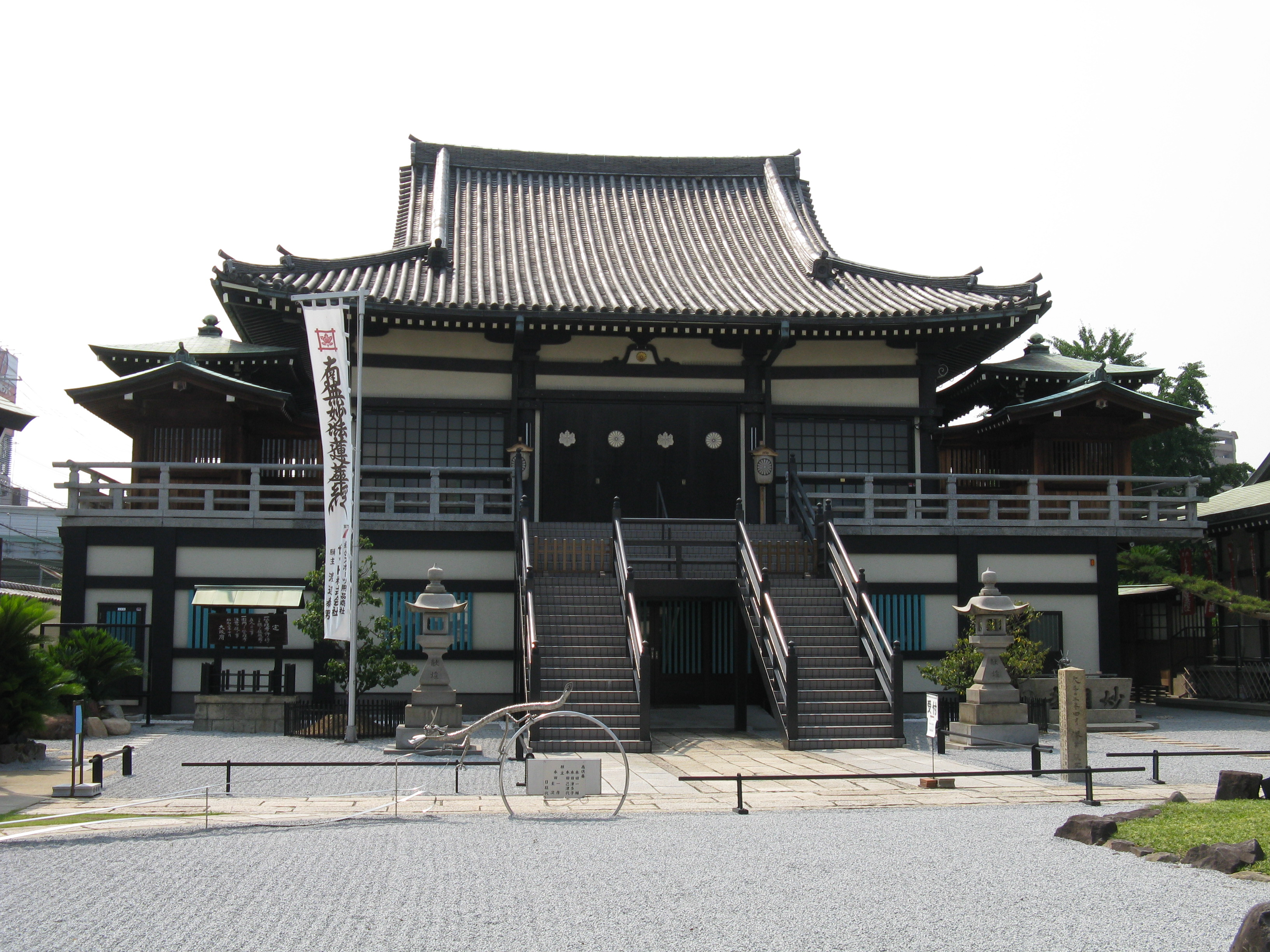
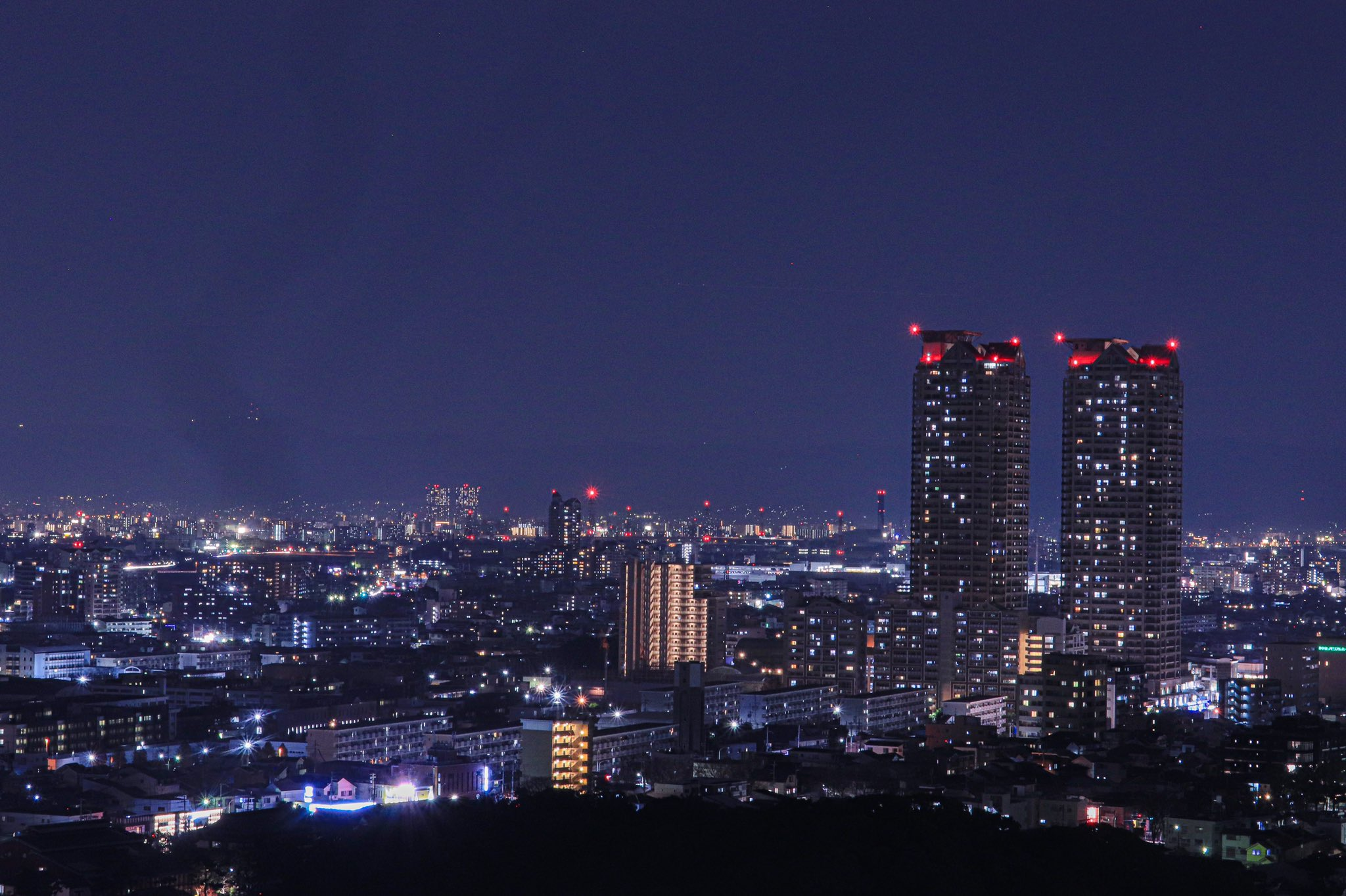
- Daisen Kofun Old Sakai Lighthouse Kurohimeyama Kofun Ōtori Shrine Myōkoku-ji Skyline of Sakai

- Flag Seal
- Location of Sakai in Osaka Prefecture

- Location in Japan
- Coordinates: 34°34′24″N 135°28′59″E
- Country: Japan
- Region: Kansai
- Prefecture: Osaka

Government
  - Mayor: Hideki Nagafuji (from June 2019)

Area
  - Total: 149.82 km^{2} (57.85 sq mi)

Population (January 1, 2022)
  - Total: 819,965
  - Density: 5,473.0/km^{2} (14,175/sq mi)
- Time zone: UTC+09:00 (JST)
- City hall address: 3-1 Minami-Kawaramachi, Sakai-ku, Sakai-shi, Osaka-fu 590-0078
- Climate: Cfa
- Website: Official website
- Symbols
- Bird: Shrike
- Flower: Iris
- Tree: Willow

Sakai (堺市, Sakai-shi; Japanese pronunciation: [saꜜ.kai, sa.kaꜜi.ɕi]) is a city located in Osaka Prefecture, Japan. It has been one of the largest and most important seaports of Japan since the medieval era. Sakai is known for its kofun, keyhole-shaped burial mounds dating from the fifth century. The kofun in Sakai include the largest grave in the world by area, Daisen Kofun. Once known for swords, Sakai is now famous for the quality of its cutlery. As of 1 January 2022, the city had an estimated population of 819,965, making it the fourteenth most populous city in Japan (excluding Tokyo).

== Geography ==
Sakai is located in southern Osaka Prefecture, on the edge of Osaka Bay and directly south of the city of Osaka.

=== Neighboring municipalities ===
Osaka Prefecture

- Habikino
- Izumi
- Kawachinagano
- Matsubara
- Osaka
- Ōsakasayama
- Takaishi

=== Climate ===
Sakai has a humid subtropical climate (Köppen Cfa) characterized by warm summers and cool winters with light to no snowfall. The average annual temperature in Sakai is 16.5 °C (61.7 °F). The average annual rainfall is 1,232.9 mm (48.54 in) with June as the wettest month. The temperatures are highest on average in August, at around 28.6 °C (83.5 °F), and lowest in January, at around 5.6 °C (42.1 °F).

Climate data for Sakai (1991−2020 normals, extremes 1977−present)
Month	Jan	Feb	Mar	Apr	May	Jun	Jul	Aug	Sep	Oct	Nov	Dec	Year
Record high °C (°F)	19.1 (66.4)	23.9 (75.0)	27.5 (81.5)	30.2 (86.4)	33.0 (91.4)	36.3 (97.3)	37.9 (100.2)	39.7 (103.5)	36.8 (98.2)	32.7 (90.9)	27.5 (81.5)	25.5 (77.9)	39.7 (103.5)
Mean daily maximum °C (°F)	9.6 (49.3)	10.5 (50.9)	14.3 (57.7)	20.0 (68.0)	24.9 (76.8)	28.1 (82.6)	32.0 (89.6)	33.9 (93.0)	29.6 (85.3)	23.6 (74.5)	17.8 (64.0)	12.3 (54.1)	21.4 (70.5)
Daily mean °C (°F)	5.6 (42.1)	6.0 (42.8)	9.3 (48.7)	14.6 (58.3)	19.4 (66.9)	23.1 (73.6)	27.2 (81.0)	28.6 (83.5)	24.6 (76.3)	18.6 (65.5)	12.9 (55.2)	7.9 (46.2)	16.5 (61.7)
Mean daily minimum °C (°F)	1.6 (34.9)	1.7 (35.1)	4.5 (40.1)	9.3 (48.7)	14.4 (57.9)	19.1 (66.4)	23.4 (74.1)	24.5 (76.1)	20.6 (69.1)	14.3 (57.7)	8.4 (47.1)	3.9 (39.0)	12.1 (53.8)
Record low °C (°F)	−5.0 (23.0)	−5.3 (22.5)	−3.3 (26.1)	−1.1 (30.0)	4.1 (39.4)	9.1 (48.4)	15.5 (59.9)	16.6 (61.9)	9.7 (49.5)	2.7 (36.9)	−0.9 (30.4)	−3.4 (25.9)	−5.3 (22.5)
Average precipitation mm (inches)	48.3 (1.90)	57.8 (2.28)	97.8 (3.85)	92.2 (3.63)	126.7 (4.99)	164.1 (6.46)	154.2 (6.07)	87.3 (3.44)	139.0 (5.47)	139.3 (5.48)	74.6 (2.94)	51.9 (2.04)	1,232.9 (48.54)
Average precipitation days (≥ 1.0mm)	6.4	6.9	9.5	9.3	9.6	11.8	10.3	6.6	10.0	8.9	6.8	6.6	102.6
Mean monthly sunshine hours	138.3	138.7	173.5	194.6	206.9	160.6	190.6	228.6	160.4	163.0	147.5	138.7	2,041.4
Source: Japan Meteorological Agency

=== Demographics ===
According to Japanese census data, the population of Sakai increased rapidly in the 1960s and 1970s, and has been relatively stable since.

Historical population
Year	Pop.	±%
1960	383,559	—
1970	616,558	+60.7%
1980	839,421	+36.1%
1990	844,899	+0.7%
2000	829,636	−1.8%
2010	842,132	+1.5%
2020	826,161	−1.9%

== History ==
=== Origins ===
The area that would later become known as Sakai has been inhabited since approximately 8,000 BC. Sakai is known for its keyhole-shaped burial mounds, or kofun, which date from the 5th century. The largest of these, Daisen Kofun, is believed to be the grave of the Emperor Nintoku and is the largest grave in the world by area. During the Kofun period between 300 and 500 AD, the Mozu Tumulus Cluster was built from over one hundred burial mounds. The name "Sakai" appears in Fujiwara Sadayori's poetry by 1045. Most of the current city is located within ancient Izumi Province; however, the wards of Mihara, Higashi and a portion of Kita are located within ancient Kawachi Province.

Tradition holds that 10,000 homes burned to the ground in 1399.

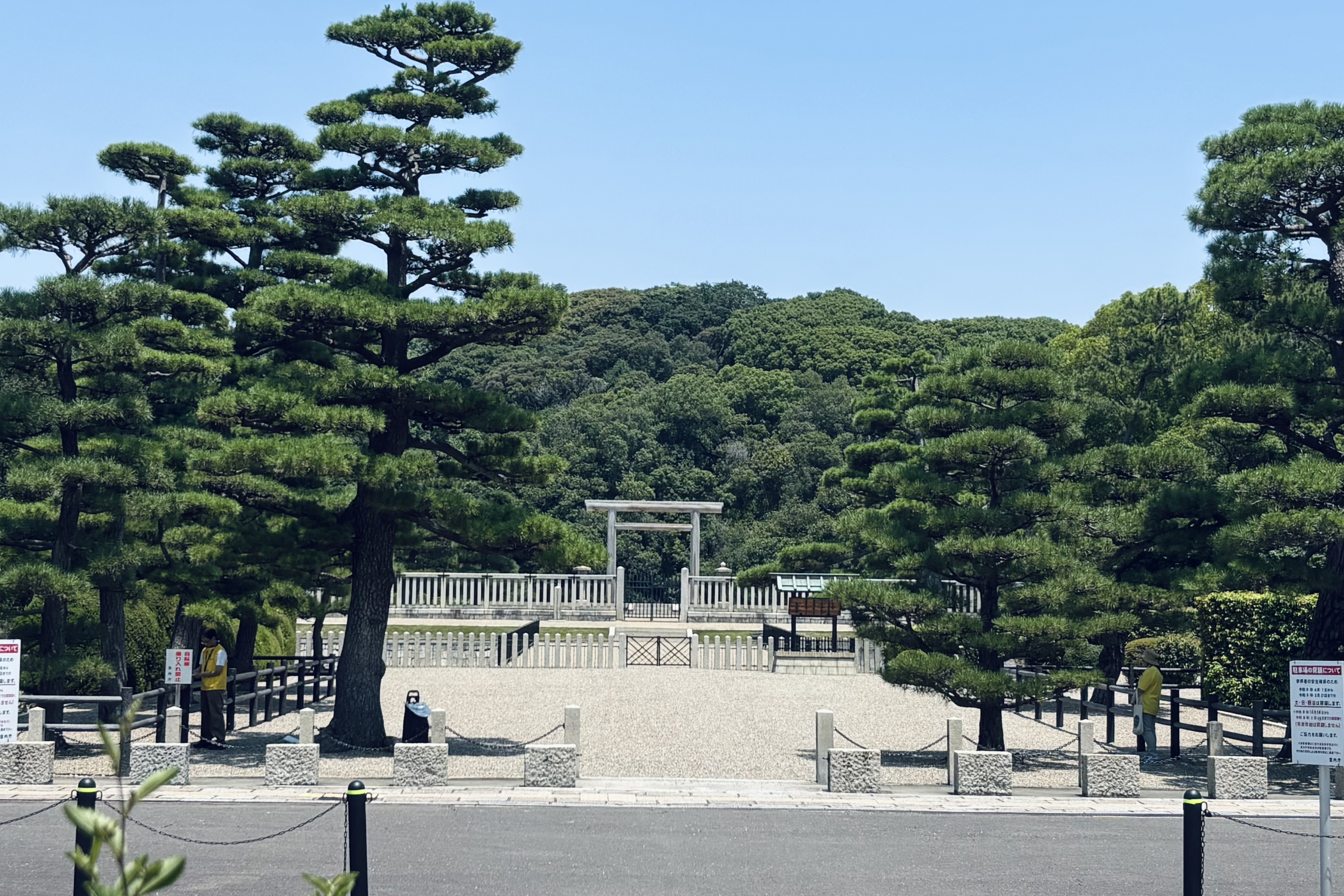
Daisen Kofun

Mozu Tombs

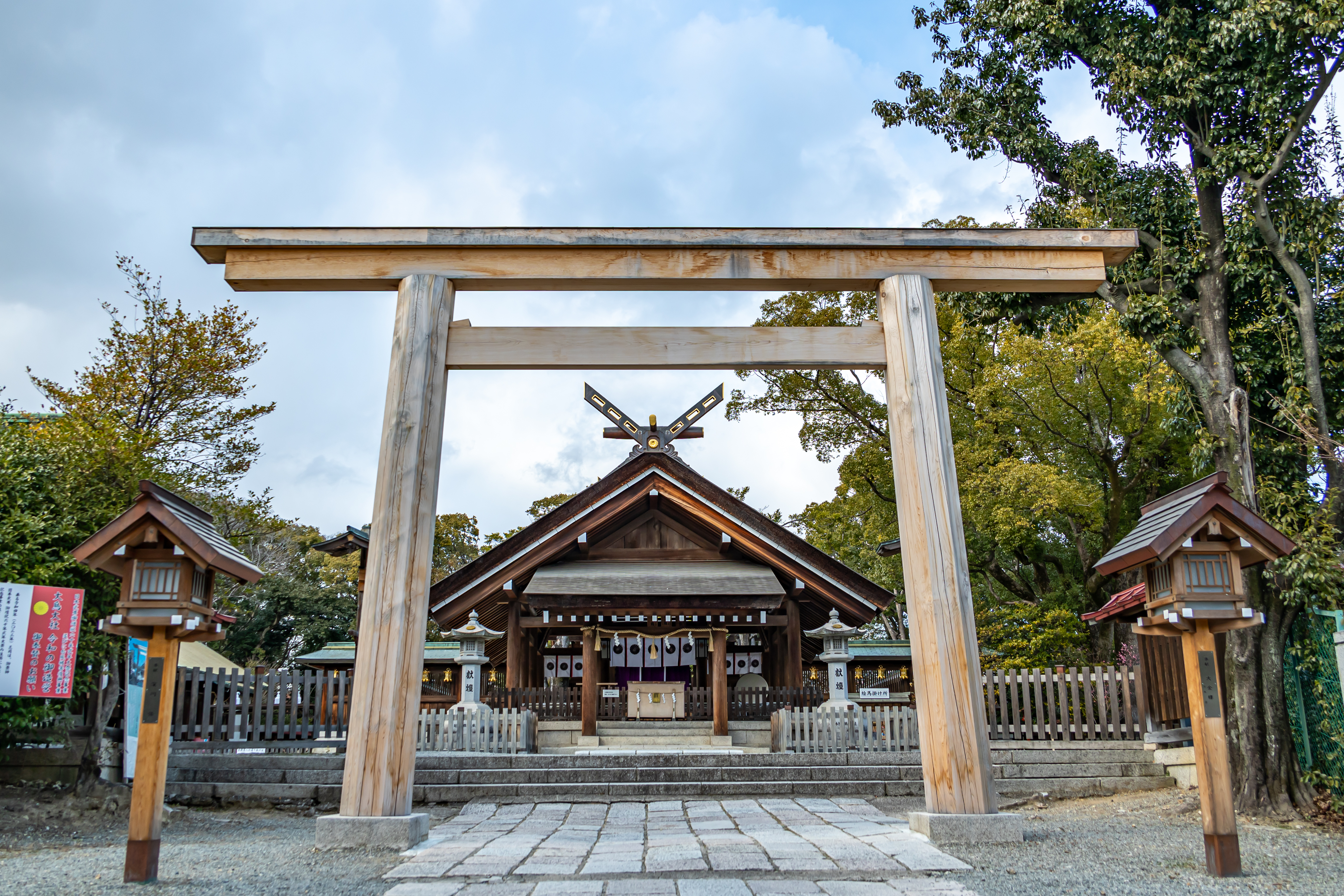
Ōtori taisha

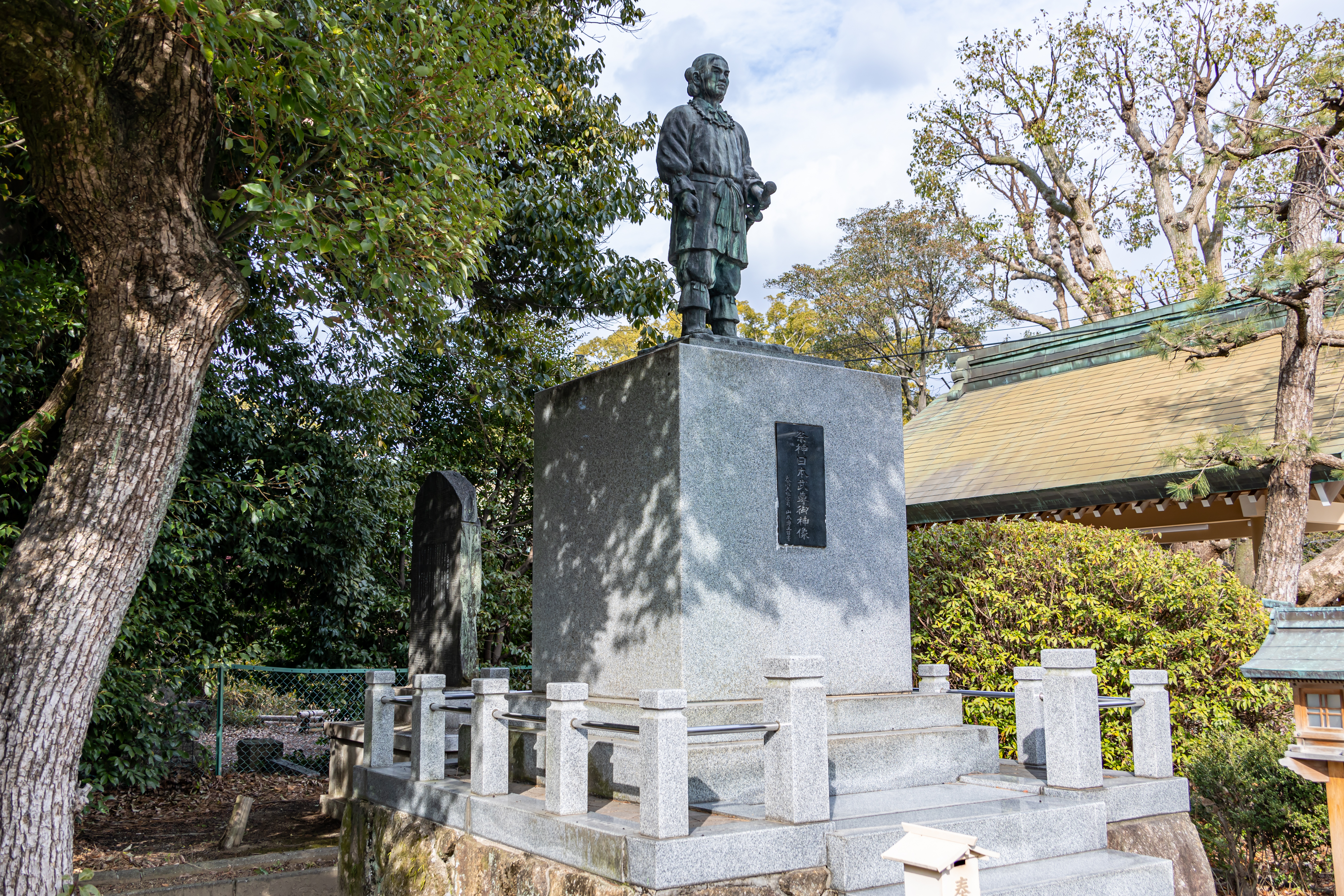
Yamato Takeru

=== Feudal period ===
Medieval Sakai was an autonomous city governed by merchant oligarchs. During the late Muromachi period and the Sengoku period, from about 1450 to 1600, Sakai developed into one of the richest cities in Japan as a center of foreign trade. It was also a leading producer of textiles and ironware. Its prosperity was often cited as a benchmark for other cities, as reflected in the saying, "Umi no Sakai, Riku no Imai" (tr. "along the sea, Sakai; inland, Imai"; the latter is now part of Kashihara, Nara). Throughout this period, Sakai maintained a close relationship with Hirano, another prosperous autonomous city. Like Sakai, Hirano was governed by leading townsmen, often described as a council (toshiyorishū). Sakai was also linked to Hirano culturally through practices such as haikai and renga.

The first reliable account of the city dates to the 1480s and includes publicly issued legal notices, suggesting that a form of urban governance already existed by that time. By the 1530s, the population had reached around 40,000, most of whom were engaged in commerce, including some of the wealthiest merchants in Japan. At this time, Sakai was administered by an oligarchy of powerful merchants. The administration was divided into ten machi (districts), which were subordinate to a representative council of wealthy townsmen known as the egōshū.

The Zen Buddhist priest Ikkyū is said to have chosen to reside in Sakai because of its relatively free atmosphere. Because of the association between the tea ceremony and Zen Buddhism, as well as the economic prosperity of its citizens, Sakai became one of the principal centers of the tea ceremony in Japan. Sen no Rikyū, widely regarded as the greatest master of the tea ceremony, was originally a merchant from Sakai.

During the Sengoku period, Christian missionaries visited Sakai and recorded its prosperity. Francis Xavier visited in 1550, and Gaspar Vilela, who visited in 1561, described the town as one of the safest places in the region and noted that it was "governed by consuls like Venice in Italy".

After the arrival of Europeans, Sakai became a center for the production of matchlock firearms, and the daimyō Oda Nobunaga became one of their major customers. During his campaign to unify Japan, Nobunaga sought to impose a heavy levy of 20,000 kan on Sakai, aiming to curtail its autonomy. While the temple town of Ishiyama (now Osaka Castle) submitted to such demands, Sakai is described in some accounts as having resisted. During this conflict, records indicate that Sakai's egōshū sent diplomatic correspondence to the toshiyorishū of Hirano, proposing a joint defense against Nobunaga's forces. However, the city eventually came under Nobunaga's control.

After the death of Nobunaga in 1582, Toyotomi Hideyoshi consolidated power and abolished Sakai's autonomous system. He also relocated merchants from Sakai and other cities to develop his base in Osaka.

Old house of gunsmiths in Sakai

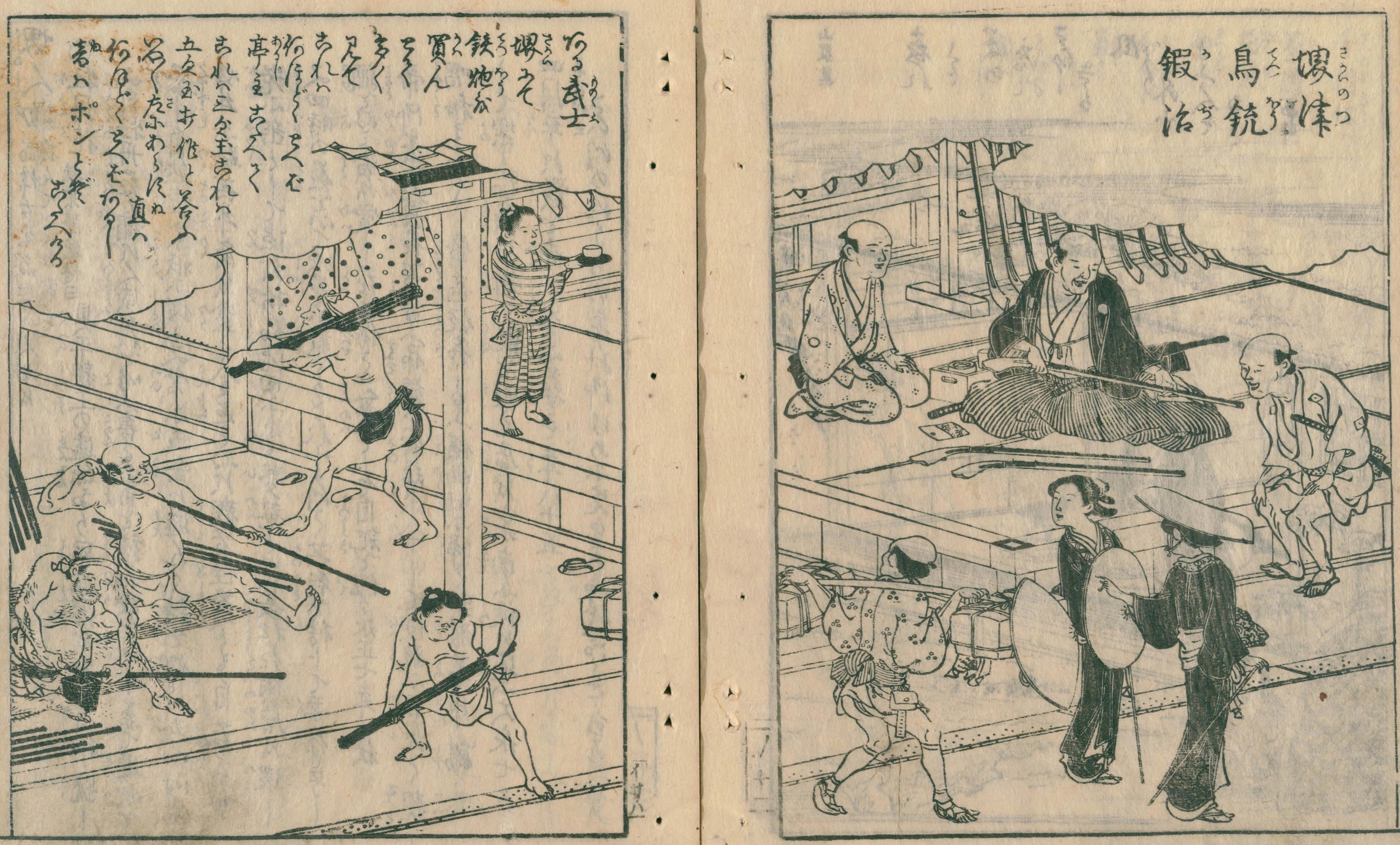
Gunsmith storefront in Sakai, Osaka

=== Edo period ===
In 1615, Sakai was razed to the ground in the summer campaign of the Siege of Osaka between the Toyotomi clan and Tokugawa Ieyasu.

Sakai was restored as an important trade center during the Edo period but was involved only in inland trade due to the sakoku policy of the Tokugawa shogunate, which isolated Japan from the outside world. It was also known for its sake brewing and its cutlery industries. After the isolation policy was abandoned during the Bakumatsu period, Sakai was the location of the Sakai Incident, involving a clash between French sailors and Japanese gendarmes resulting in multiple casualties. When the Western powers demanded the opening of Osaka a port for foreign trade, both Sakai and Hyōgo were named as candidates; however, Sakai's proximity and ease of access to Kyoto and the presence of many imperial tombs led to the selection of Hyōgo.

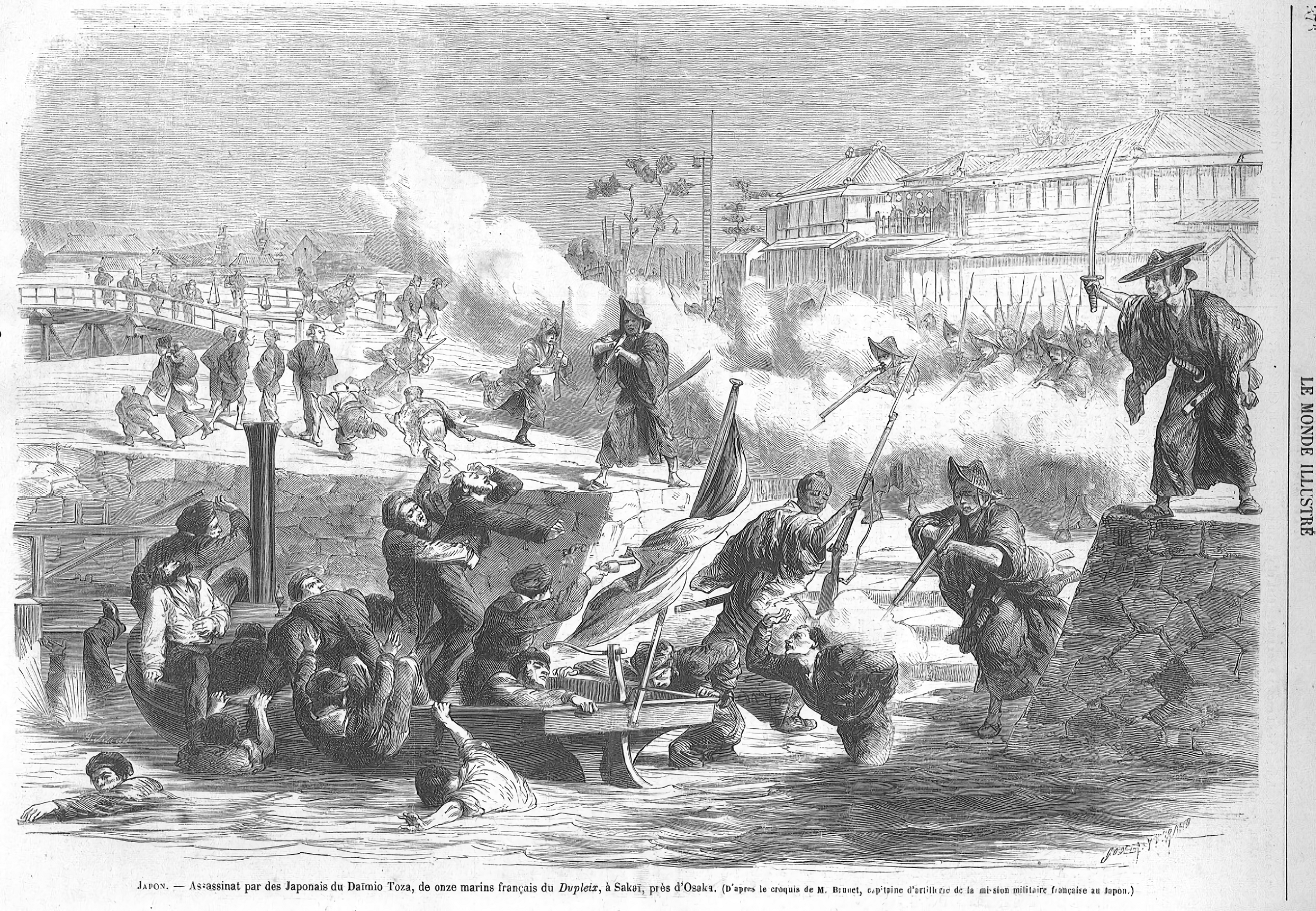
Sakai incident (1868)

=== Modern Sakai ===
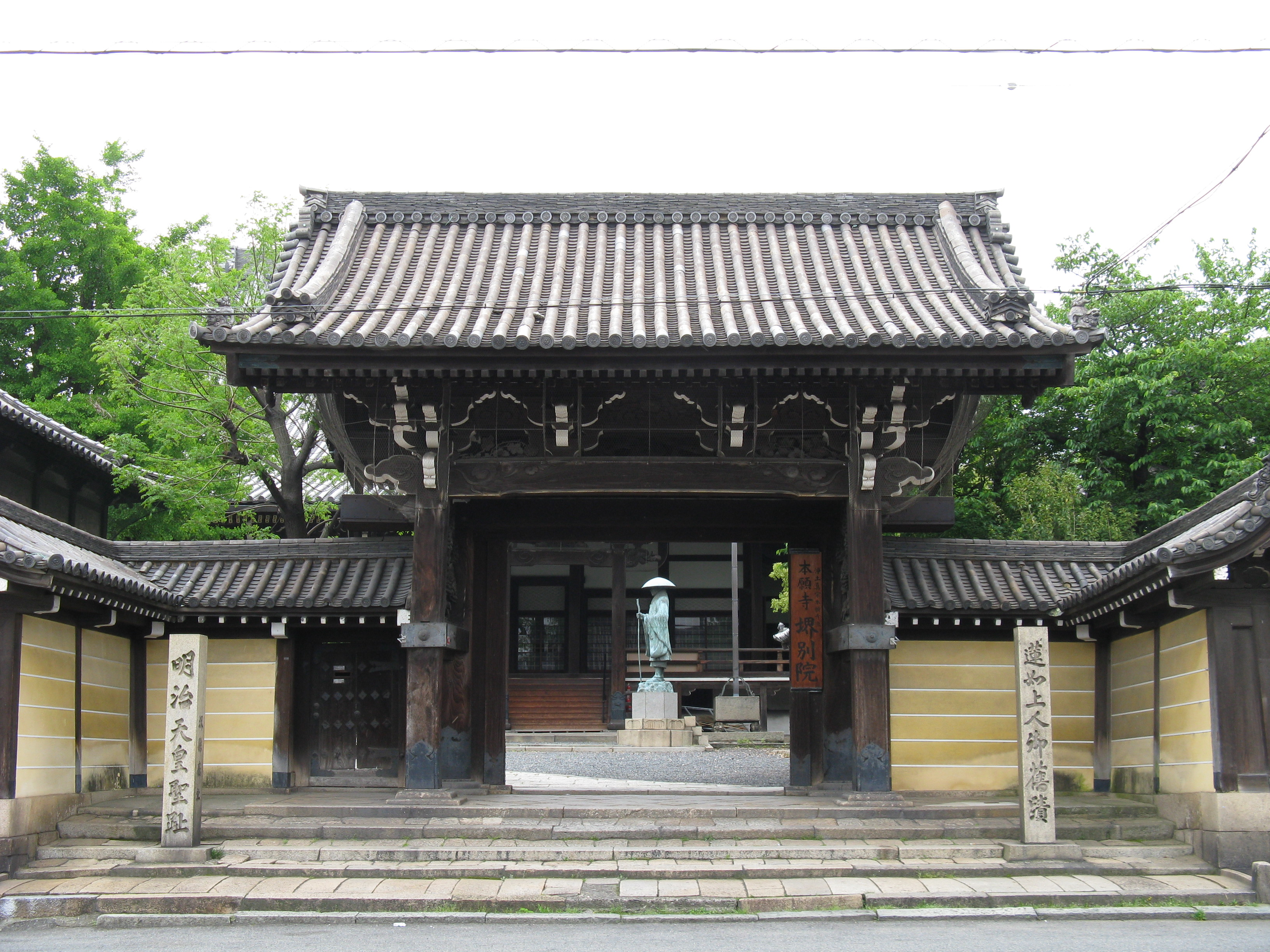
The Honganji Sakai branch temple served as Sakai prefectural government building.

Following the Meiji restoration, Sakai was transformed into an industrial center as part of the Hanshin Industrial Region, with industries centering on textiles and brick making. In the restoration, the area of what would become Sakai City became part of Sakai Prefecture which was expanded to comprise the Southeastern part of present-day Osaka and, from 1876 to 1881, also annexed Nara Prefecture. In 1881, Sakai became part of Osaka. The city of Sakai was proclaimed on April 1, 1889, with the creation of the modern municipalities system. It was one of the first 31 cities to be created in Japan. The 1934 Muroto typhoon killed over 300 people in Sakai. Another major disaster was in 1945, when the city was heavily bombed on six occasions during World War II with over 1800 civilian deaths. Following the February 2005 annexation of the town of Mihara (from Minamikawachi District), Sakai became a designated city in April 2006 giving it a greater measure of self-determination in governmental affairs.

== Government ==
Sakai has a mayor-council form of government with a directly elected mayor and a unicameral city council of 52 members. Sakai contributes eight members to the Osaka Prefectural Assembly. In terms of national politics, the city is divided between the Osaka 15th district, Osaka 16th district and Osaka 17th districts of the lower house of the Diet of Japan.

=== Local administration ===
Sakai has seven wards (ku):

Wards of Sakai
	Place Name					Map of Sakai
	Rōmaji	Kanji	Population	Land area in km^{2}	Pop. density per km^{2}	
1	Sakai-ku (administrative center)	堺区	148,353	23.66	6,270	A map of Sakai's Wards
2	Higashi-ku	東区	84,708	10.49	8,075	A map of Sakai's Wards
3	Kita-ku	北区	159,084	15.60	10,198	A map of Sakai's Wards
4	Naka-ku	中区	120,216	17.88	6,723	A map of Sakai's Wards
5	Nishi-ku	西区	134,389	28.62	4,696	A map of Sakai's Wards
6	Mihara-ku	美原区	37,223	13.20	2,820	A map of Sakai's Wards
7	Minami-ku	南区	135,992	40.39	3,367	A map of Sakai's Wards

=== Cityscape ===
Gallery

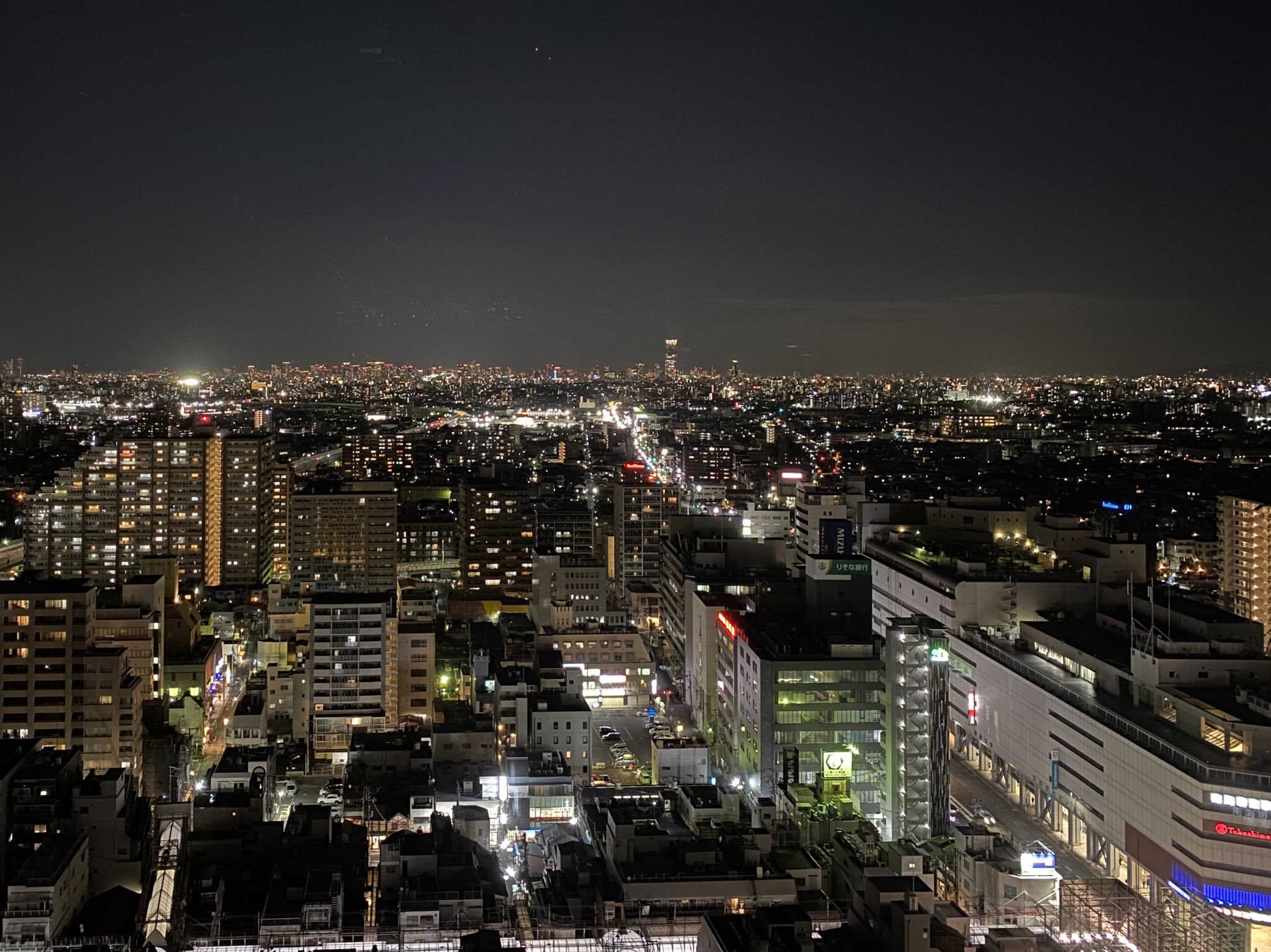
Sakai City Downtown (2020)

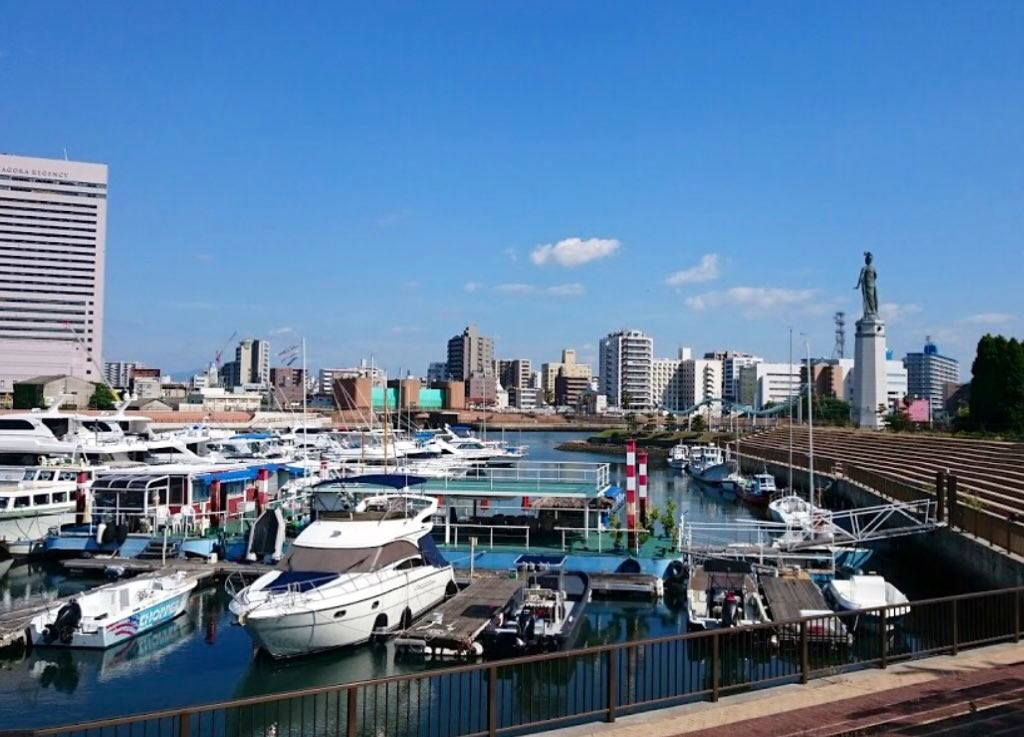
Old Sakai Port (2020)

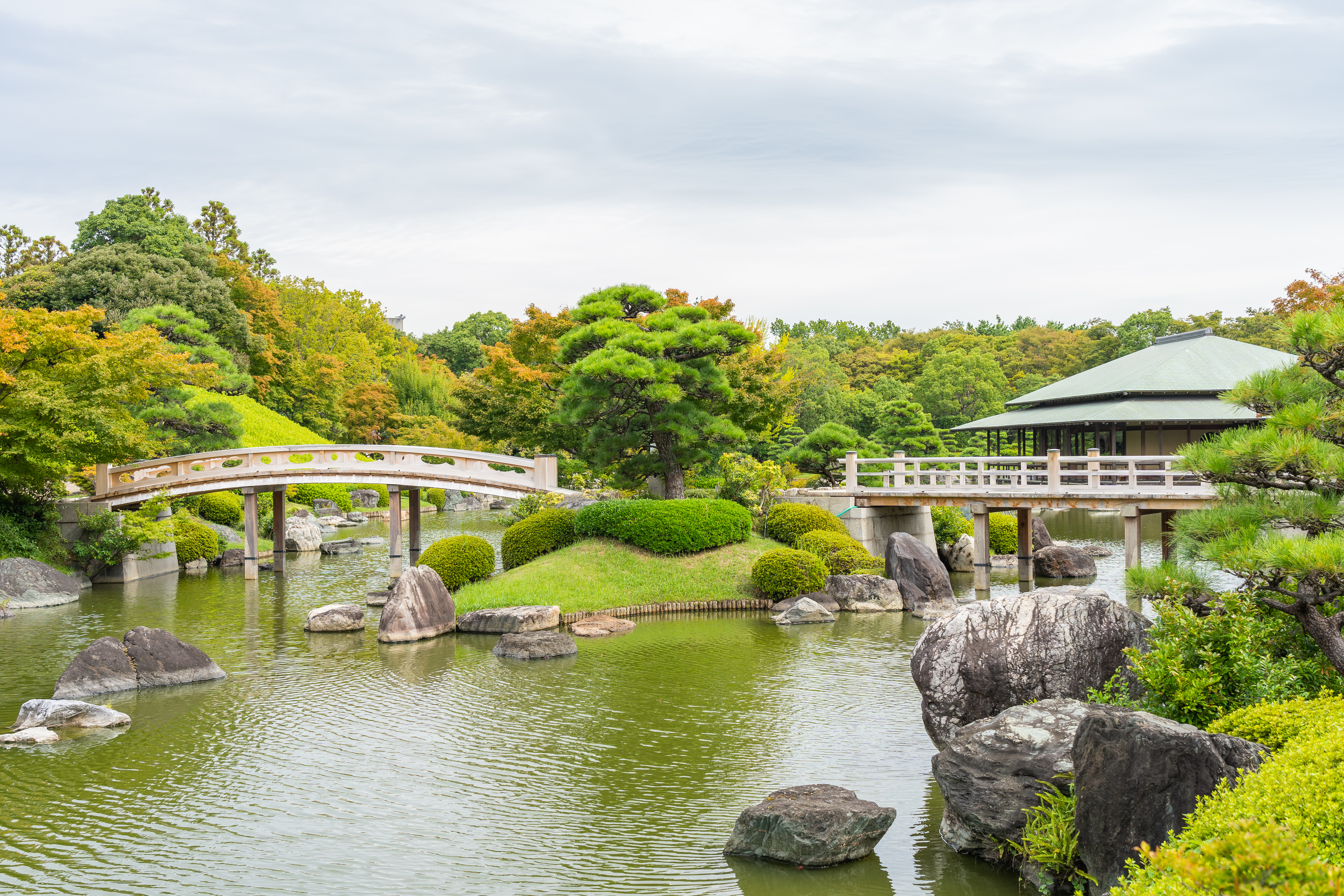
Daisen Park (2019)

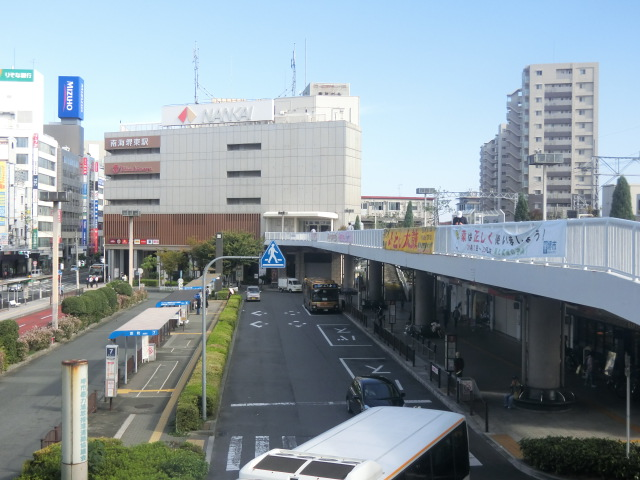
Sakaihigashi Station (2016)

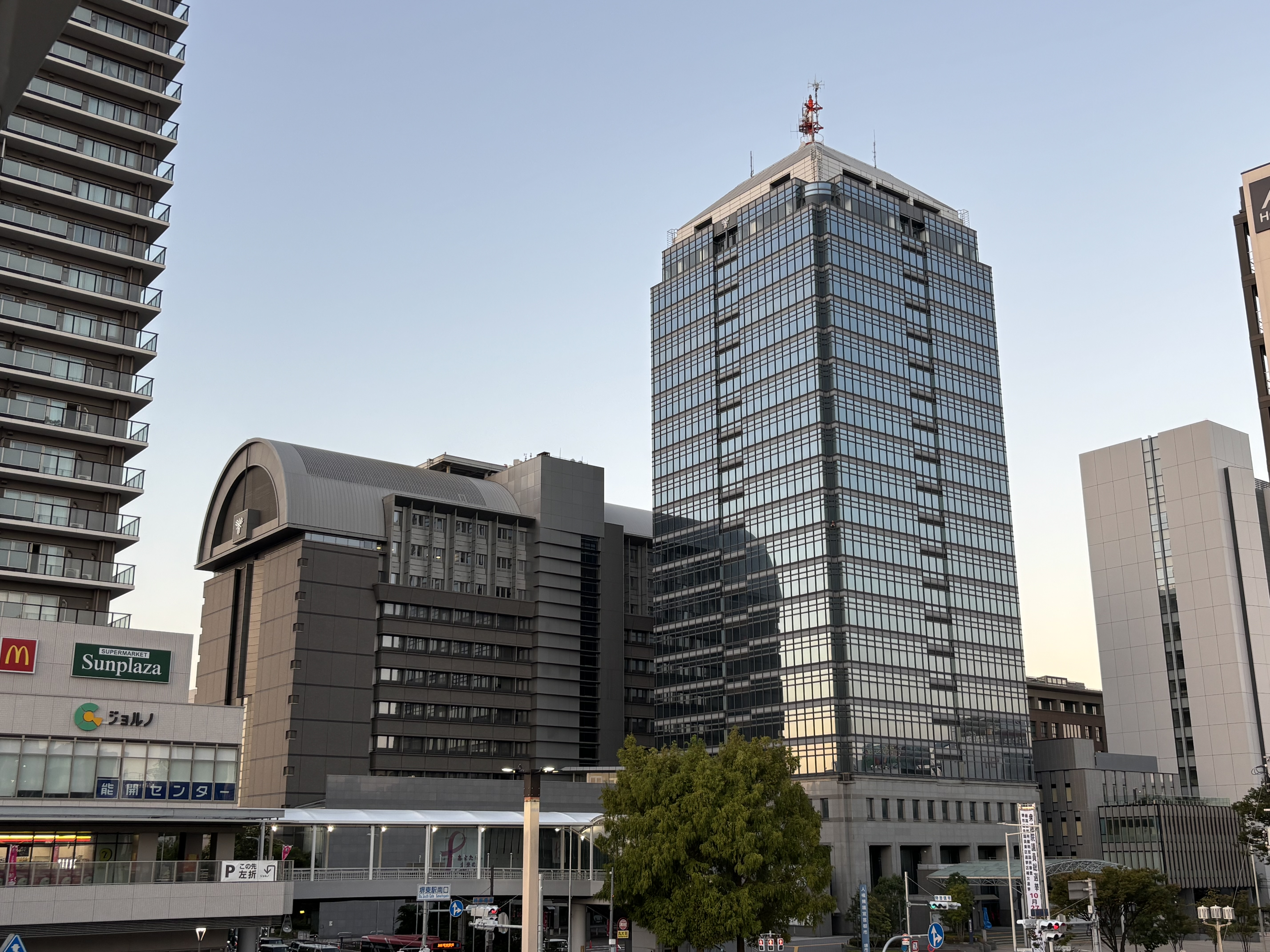
Sakai City Hall (2024)

== Economy ==
Sakai was traditionally dependent on heavy industry and its port. However, after a period of high economic growth after World War II, along with the development and expansion of the Osaka metropolitan area, Sakai also has increasingly become a satellite city (commuter town) for Osaka metropolis, as represented by the development of Senboku New Town. Shimano, a major manufacturer of cycling and fishing products, is based in Sakai.

Kura Sushi, the conveyor belt sushi chain, has its headquarters in Sakai.

== Education ==
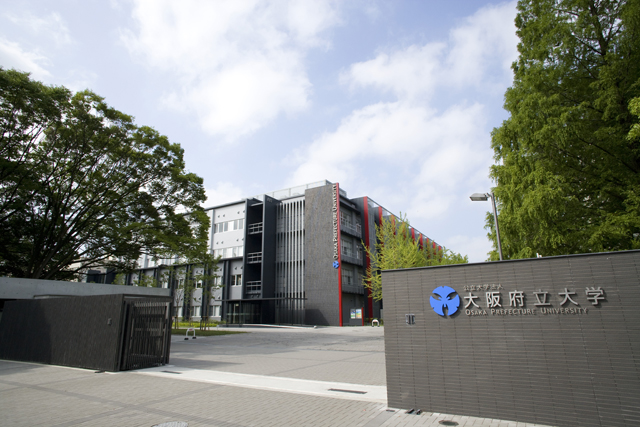
Osaka Prefecture University

=== Universities ===
- Hagoromo International University
- Kansai University Sakai Campus
- Osaka Butsuryo University
- Osaka Junior College of Social Health and Welfare
- Osaka Prefecture University
- Poole Gakuin University
- Sakai Women's Junior College
- Taisei Gakuin University
- Tezukayama Gakuin University

=== Primary and secondary schools ===
Sakai has 98 public elementary schools and 43 public middle schools operated by the city government. The city also has one private elementary school, three private combined middle/high schools and one private combined elementary/middle/high school. The city has 23 public high schools operated by the Osaka Prefectural Board of Education, and four private high schools. The city operates two and the prefecture operates four special education schools for the disabled.

The city previously had a North Korean school, Sakai Korean Elementary School (堺朝鮮初級学校).

== Transportation ==
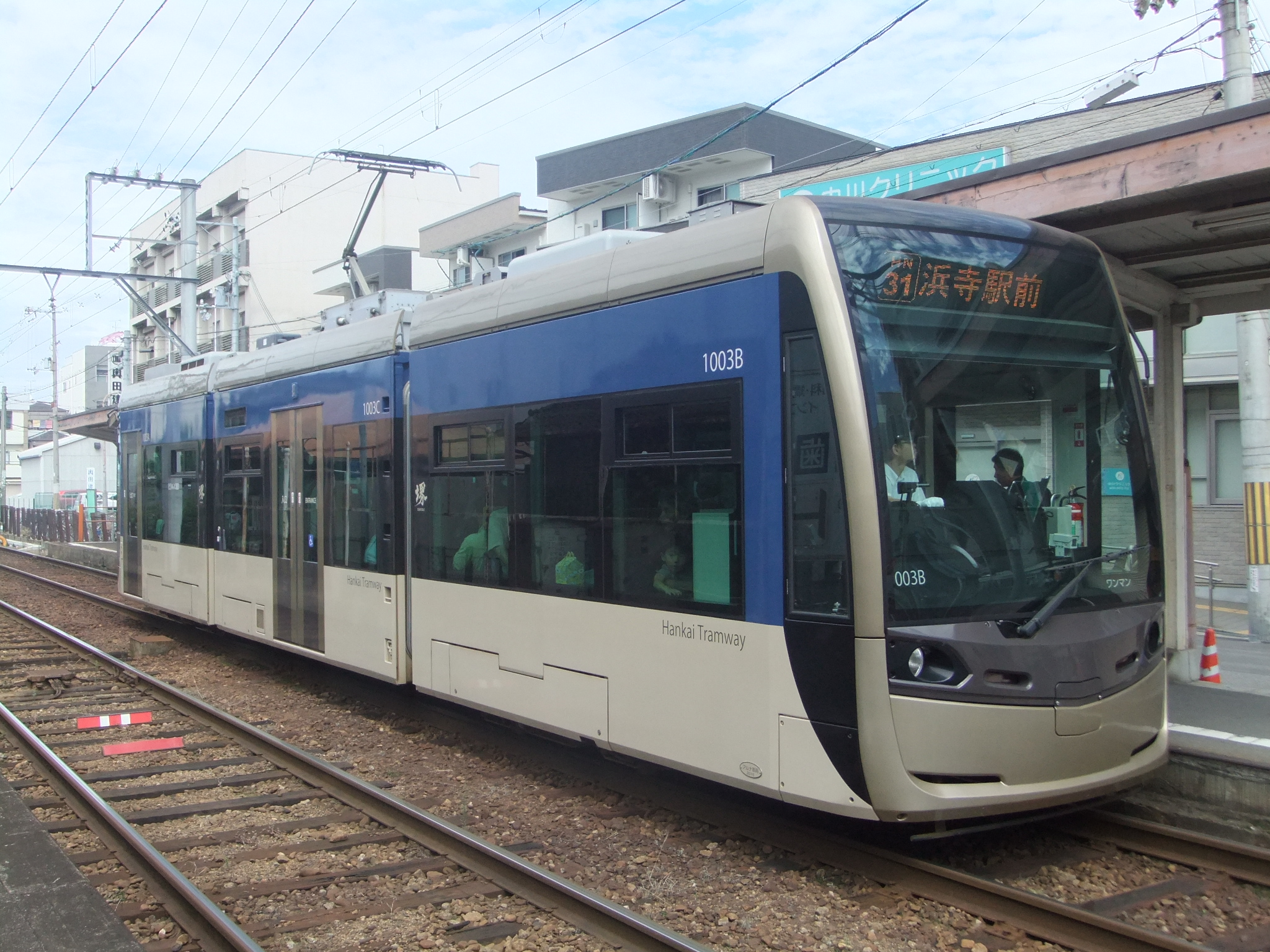
Hankai Tramway

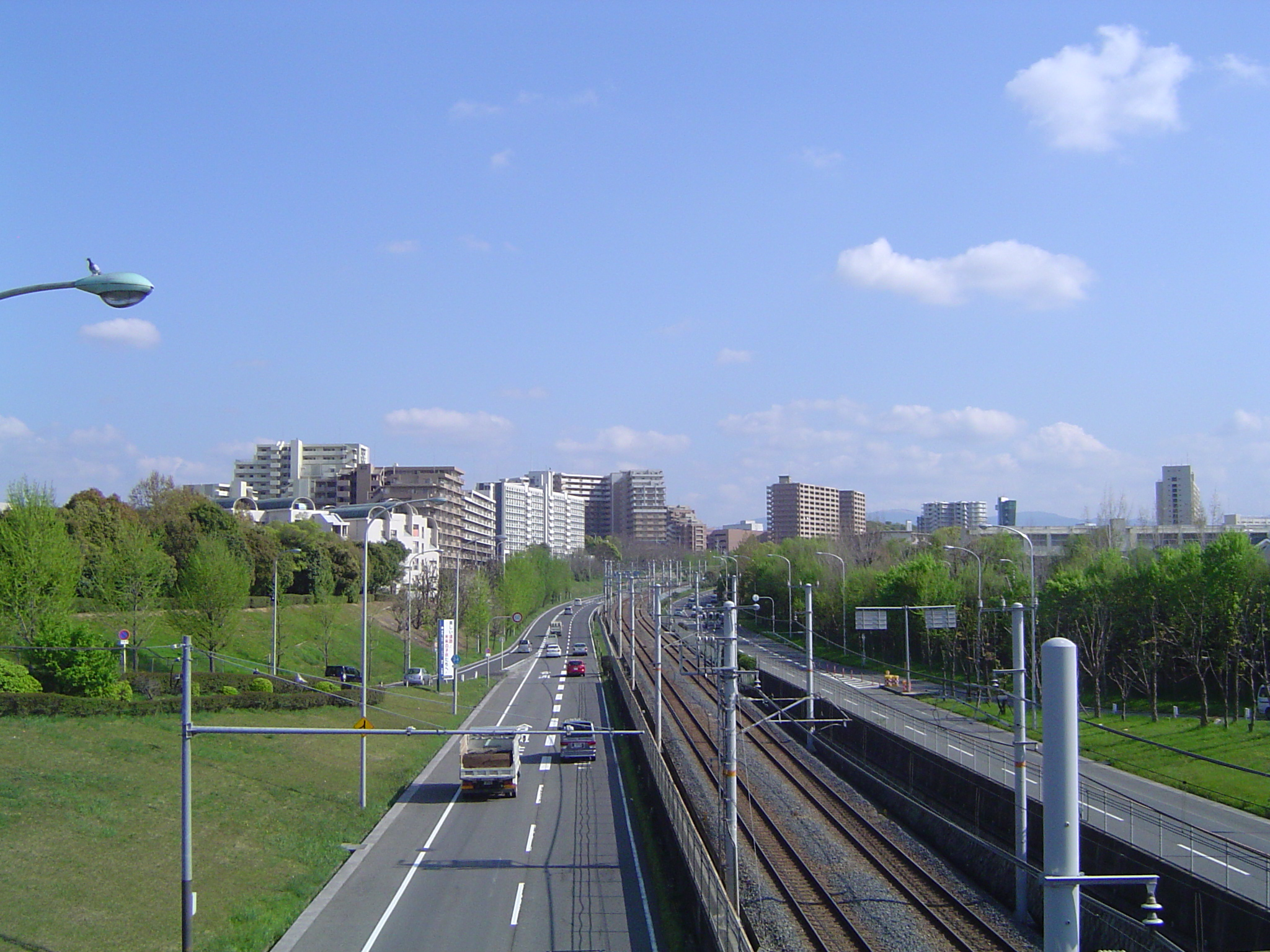
Senboku New Town & Semboku Rapid Railway

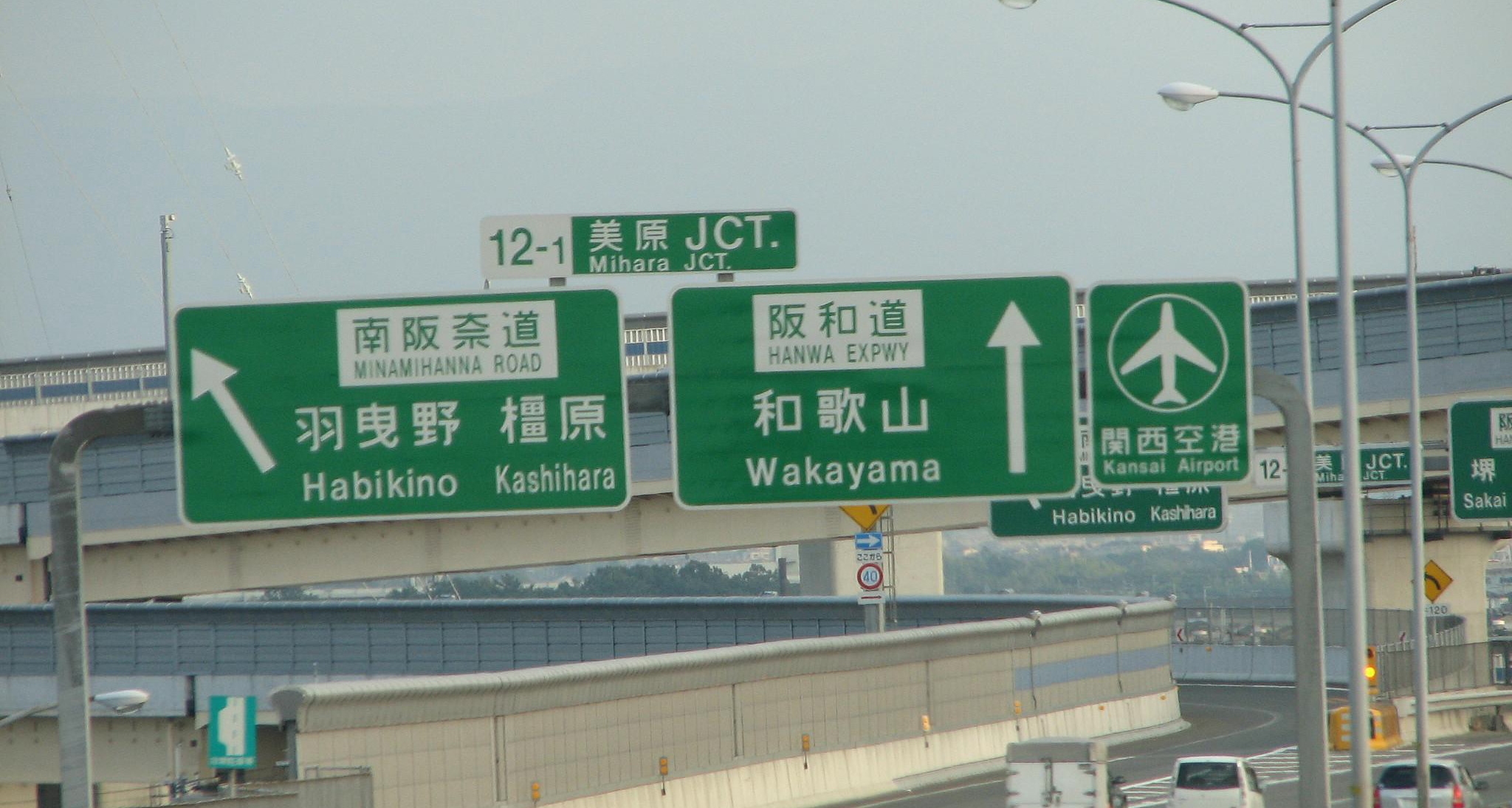
Mihara JCT

=== Airways ===
==== Airport ====
Sakai does not have an airport. The nearest major airport is Kansai International Airport.

=== Railways ===
JR West – Hanwa Line

- Asaka - Sakaishi - Mikunigaoka - Mozu - Uenoshiba - Tsukuno - Ōtori

Nankai Electric Railway - Nankai Main Line

- Shichidō - Sakai - Minato - Ishizugawa - Suwanomori - Hamaderakōen

Nankai Electric Railway - Kōya Line

- Asakayama - Sakaihigashi - Mikunigaoka - Mozuhachiman - Nakamozu - Shirasagi - Hatsushiba - Hagiharatenjin - Kitanoda

Nankai Electric Railway - Semboku Line

- Nakamozu - Fukai - Izumigaoka - Toga-Mikita - Kōmyōike

==== Subway ====
Osaka Metro - Midōsuji Line

- Kitahanada - Shinkanaoka - Nakamozu

==== Tramway ====
Hankai Tramway

- Hankai Line: (Sumiyoshi)- Yamatogawa - Takasu-jinsha - Ayanochō - Shimmeichō - Myokokuji-mae - Hanataguchi - Oshōji - Shukuin - Terajichō - Goryomae - Higashi-Minato - Ishizu-Kita - Ishizu - Funao - Hamaderakōen

=== Bus ===
- Nankai Bus Company, Limited
  - Nankai wing Bus kanaoka Company, Limited
- Kintetsu Bus
- Osaka City Bus

=== Highways ===
==== Expressways ====
- Hanwa Expressway
- Sakai Senboku Road
- Minami-Hanna Road
- Hanshin Expressway
  - 4 Bayshore Route
  - 6 Yamatogawa Route
  - 15 Sakai Route

==== Japan National Route ====
- National Route 26
- National Route 309
- National Route 310

== International relations ==
=== Sister cities ===
- Berkeley, California, United States, since 1967
- Lianyungang, Jiangsu, China, since 1983
- Wellington, New Zealand, since 1994

=== Friendship cities ===
- Tanegashima, Kagoshima, Japan, since 1986
- Higashiyoshino, Nara, Japan, since 1986
- Da Nang, Vietnam, since 2019

== Notable people from Sakai ==
- Kataoka Ainosuke VI, Kabuki actor, actor, television presenter and entertainer.
- Yuki Morisaki, chef and entertainer
- Reon Kadena, glamour model and actress
- Emperor Nintoku, the 16th Emperor of Japan
- Gyōki, Japanese Buddhist priest of the Nara period
- Ikkyū, Zen Buddhist monk and poet.
- Sen no Rikyū, Japanese tea master
- Tsuda Sōgyū, Japanese tea master
- Imai Sōkyū, Japanese tea master and merchant
- Ōuchi Yoshihiro, Muromachi period samurai clan head and military leader
- Kenzō Tange, Japanese award-winning architect
- Takeno Jōō
- Oreskaband, all-female ska band
- Kana-Boon, Japanese rock band
- Nobuaki Kakuda, karateka and kickboxer
- Hiroki Suzuki, Japanese actor and singer
- Kentaro Kobuchi and Shunsuke Kuroda, the members of the music group Kobukuro
- Akiko Yosano, poet and novelist
- Ryumon Yasuda, painter and sculptor
- Hideo Nomo worked in Shin-nittetsu Sakai and played on its club team before he was scouted by the Kintetsu Buffaloes
- Yudetamago, manga artist duo (attended Hatsushiba High School in Higashi-ku)
- Akio Mori, a well known K-1 kickboxer known as Musashi (kickboxer)
- Akira Nagata, actor and singer/vocalist, member of J-pop group Run&Gun
- CIMA, Japanese professional wrestler
- Fuka Koshiba, Japanese actress
- Peter, Japanese singer, dancer and actor
- Ayumi Beppu, Japanese actress
- Yuta Fujiwara, Japanese racing driver

== Local attractions ==
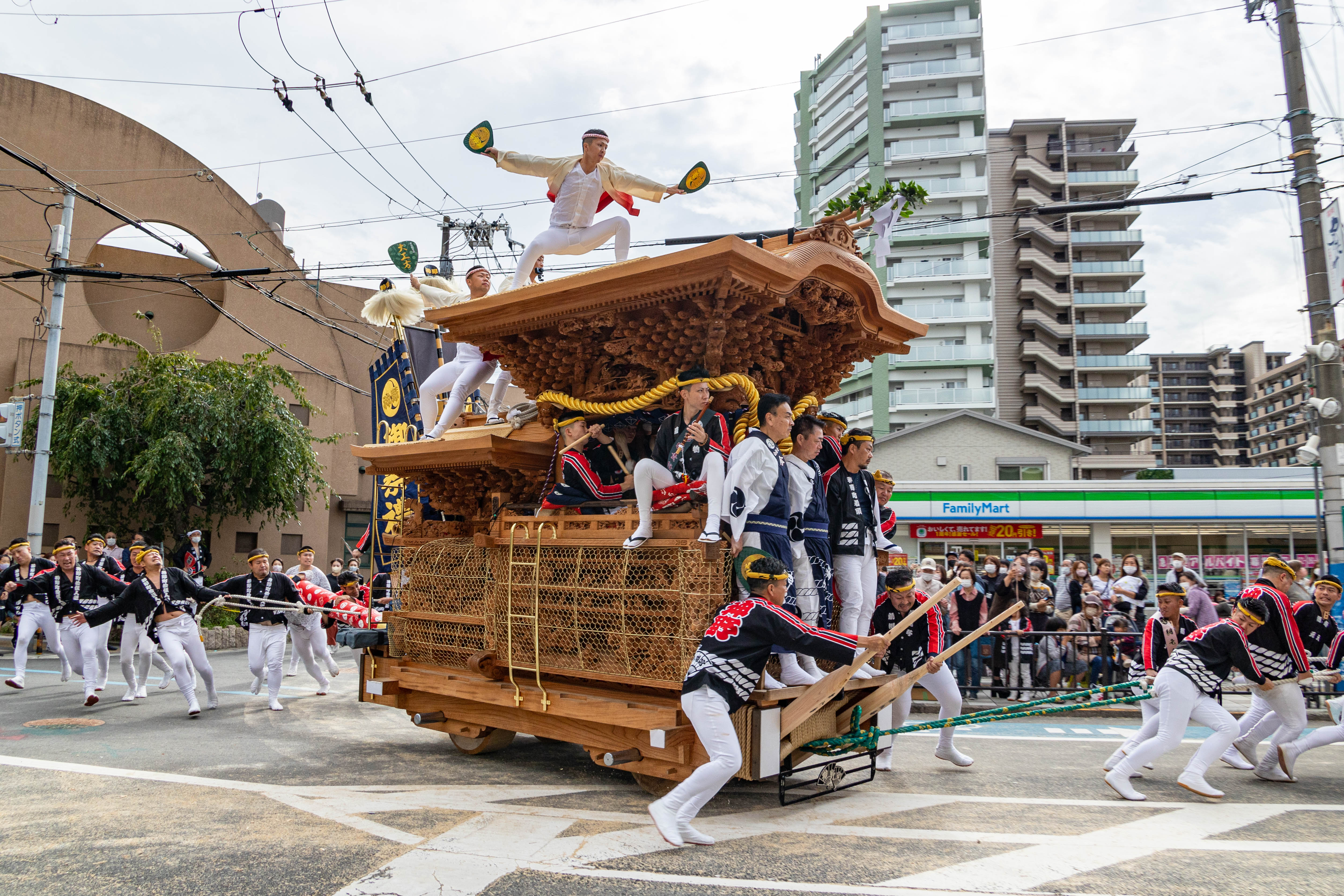
Tsukuno Danjiri Matsuri

- Mozu Kofun Cluster
- Kurohimeyama Kofun
- Yotsu-ike Site
- Dotō
- Sakai City Museum
- Sakai Matsuri
- Tsukuno Danjiri Matsuri

== See also ==
- Osaka Metropolis plan
