= Shirasagi =

Shirasagi (Japanese for egret, 白鷺) may refer to:

- Shirasagi (train), a limited express train in Japan
- Shirasagi Station, a railway station in Sakai, Japan
- Shirasagi, a 1958 Japanese film known also as The Snowy Heron
- Shirasagi-jō, another name of Himeji Castle
- Shirasagi: 13 Japanese Birds Pt. 11, an album by Masami Akita
