= Sakai-ku =

Ward of Sakai, Osaka Prefecture, Japan

Coordinates: 34°34′24″N 135°28′59″E

Sakai-ku in the city

Map

Sakai-ku (堺区) is a ward of the city of Sakai in Osaka Prefecture, Japan. The ward has an area of 23.69 km^{2} and a population of 147,413. The population density is 6,223 per square kilometer.

The wards of Sakai were established when Sakai became a city designated by government ordinance on April 1, 2006.

The city has its municipal headquarters in Sakai-ku and Sakai City Museum is located in the area.

== Train stations located in Sakai-ku ==
Central stations: Sakai-Higashi Station, Sakai Station, Sakai-shi Station

- West Japan Railway Company (JR West)
  - Hanwa Line: Asaka Station - Sakaishi Station - Mikunigaoka Station - Mozu Station
- Nankai Electric Railway
  - Nankai Main Line: Shichidō Station - Sakai Station - Minato Station
  - Nankai Kōya Line: Asakayama Station - Sakaihigashi Station - Mikunigaoka Station - Mozuhachiman Station
- Hankai Tramway
  - Hankai Line: Yamatogawa - Takasu-jinja - Ayanocho - Shimmeicho - Myokokuji-mae - Hanataguchi - Oshoji - Shukuin - Terajicho - Goryomae - Higashi-Minato
