= Mikunigaoka Station (Osaka) =

Railway station in Sakai, Japan

Mikunigaoka Station 三国ヶ丘駅
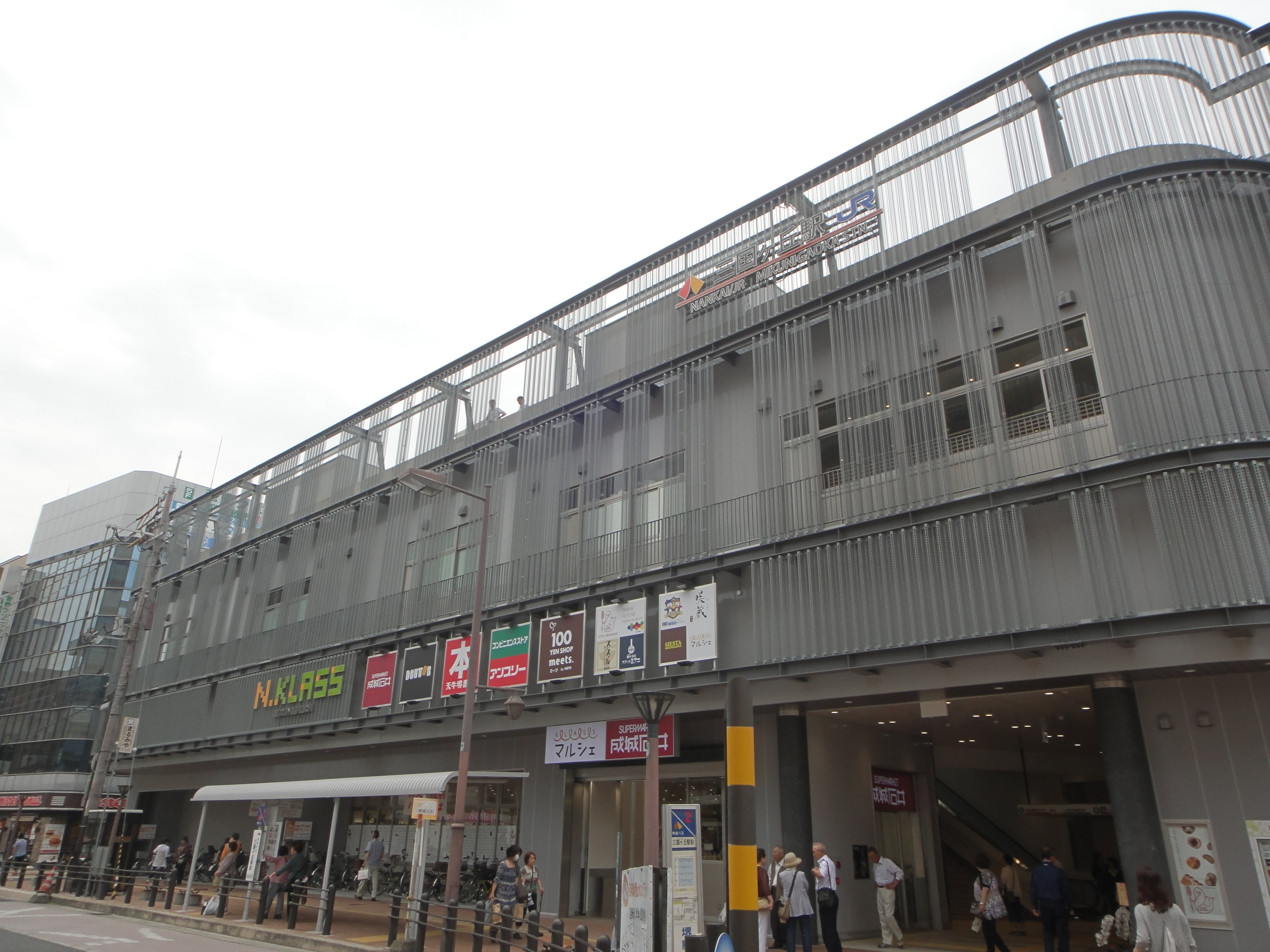
- Mikunigaoka Station east entrance in June 2014

General information
- Location: Nakamachi, Sakai-ku, Sakai-shi; Japan
- Coordinates: 34°33′54.95″N 135°29′34.05″E
- Operator: JR West Nankai Electric Railway
- Line: R Hanwa Line Koya Line
- Distance: 10.2 km from Tennōji
- Platforms: 4 side platforms (2 for each line)
- Tracks: 4

Other information
- Status: staffed
- Station code: JR-R29 (JR); NK57 (Nankai)
- Website: Official website

Passengers
- FY2019: 24,227 boarding daily (JR); 20,604 boarding daily (Nankai)
Location
- Location within Osaka Prefecture Location within Japan

Mikunigaoka Station (三国ヶ丘駅 (Nankai) / 三国ケ丘駅 (JR West), Mikunigaoka-eki) is a junction railway station located in Sakai-ku, Sakai, Osaka, Japan. It is jointly operated by the West Japan Railway Company (JR West) and the private railway operator Nankai Electric Railway.

== Lines ==
Mikunigaoka Station is served by the JR Hanwa Line, and is located 10.2 kilometers from the northern terminus of the line at Tennōji. It is also served by the Nankai Koya Line and is 10.2 kilometers from the terminus of that line at Shiomibashi and 11.8 kilometers from Namba.

== Station layout ==
The station consists of two sets of opposed side platform pairs connected in each case by elevated station buildings. The stations are both staffed.

=== Platforms ===
Nankai Railway

1	■ Koya Line	for Koyasan and (Semboku Rapid Railway) Izumi-Chuo
2	■ Koya Line	for Namba

JR West

1	■ Hanwa Line	for Ōtori, Wakayama and Kansai Airport
2	■ Hanwa Line	for Tennōji and Osaka

== Adjacent stations ==
«	Service	»
Nankai Railway Koya Line (NK57)
Sakaihigashi (NK56)	Local (各駅停車)	Mozuhachiman (NK58)
Sakaihigashi (NK56)	Semi-Express	Mozuhachiman (NK58)
Sub. Express: Does not stop at this station
Express: Does not stop at this station
Rapid Express: Does not stop at this station
Limited Express "Koya", "Rinkan", "Semboku Liner": Does not stop at this station
JR West Hanwa Line
Sakaishi	Local	Mozu
Sakaishi	Regional Rapid Service	Ōtori
Sakaishi	Direct Rapid Service	Ōtori
Sakaishi	Rapid Service	Ōtori
Sakaishi	Kansai Airport Rapid Service; Kishuji Rapid Service	Ōtori
Limited Express Kuroshio: Does not stop at this station
Kansai Airport Limited Express Haruka: Does not stop at this station

== History ==
Mikunigaoka Station opened on 15 February 1942. With the privatization of the Japan National Railways (JNR) on 1 April 1987, the former JNR portion of the station came under the aegis of the West Japan Railway Company.

Station numbering was introduced on the Hanwa Line in March 2018 with its platforms being assigned station number JR-R29.

== Passenger statistics ==
In fiscal 2019, the Nankai station was used by an average of 40,650 passengers daily. The JR portion of the station was used by 24,227 passengers (boarding only) during the same period.

== Surrounding area ==
- Mozu Tombs
- Sakai City Sakai High School

== See also ==
- List of railway stations in Japan
