= Hagiharatenjin Station =

Railway station in Sakai, Japan

Hagiharatenjin Station 萩原天神駅
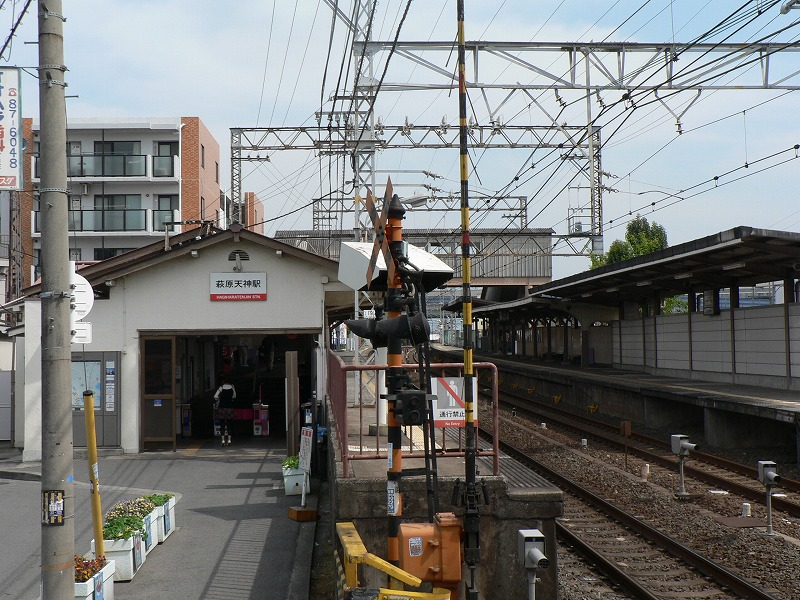
- Hagiharatenjin Station in April 2007

General information
- Location: 94-3, Hikishō-Haraderamachi, Higashi-ku, Sakai-shi, Osaka-fu 599-8112; Japan
- Coordinates: 34°32′15″N 135°32′04″E
- Operator: Nankai Electric Railway
- Line: Koya Line
- Distance: 17.5 km from Shiomibashi
- Platforms: 2 side platforms
- Tracks: 2

Other information
- Station code: NK62
- Website: Official website

History
- Opened: October 10, 1912

Passengers
- 2019: 7550 daily
Location
- Location within Osaka Prefecture Location within Japan

Hagiharatenjin Station (萩原天神駅, Hagiharatenjin-eki) is a passenger railway station located in Higashi-ku, Sakai, Osaka Prefecture, Japan, operated by the private railway operator Nankai Electric Railway. It has the station number "NK62".

== Lines ==
Hagiharatenjin Station is served by the Nankai Koya Line, and is 17.5 kilometers from the terminus of the line at Shiomibashi and 16.8 kilometers from Nanba.

== Layout ==
The station consists of two opposed side platforms connected by a footbridge. After an accident at the door of a local train in 2007, the platform display was reconstructed, and then the height of the platforms were raised in 2008 and elevators were installed in 2009.

=== Platforms ===
1	■ Koya Line	for Koyasan
2	■ Koya Line	for Namba

== Adjacent stations ==
«	Service	»
Koya Line (NK62)
Hatsushiba (NK61)	Local	Kitanoda (NK63)
Hatsushiba (NK61)	Semi-Express (only running for Namba)	Kitanoda (NK63)
Sub Express: Does not stop at this station
Express: Does not stop at this station
Rapid Express: Does not stop at this station
Limited Express "Koya", "Rinkan": Does not stop at this station

== History ==
Hagiharatenjin Station opened on October 10, 1912.

== Passenger statistics ==
In fiscal 2019, the station was used by an average of 7550 passengers daily.

== Surrounding area ==
- Hagiwara Shrine
- Higashi Ward Office, Sakai
- Sakai City Fire Bureau Higashi Fire Station
- the Church of God in Japan Minami-Sakai Church

== See also ==
- List of railway stations in Japan
