= Higashi-ku, Sakai =

Ward of Sakai, Osaka Prefecture, Japan

Coordinates: 34°32′17.49″N 135°32′11.73″E

Map

higashi-ku in the city

Higashi-ku (東区) is a ward of the city of Sakai in Osaka Prefecture, Japan. The ward has an area of 10.48 km^{2} and a population of 85,263. The population density is 8,136 per square kilometer. The name means "East Ward."

The wards of Sakai were established when Sakai became a city designated by government ordinance on April 1, 2006.

== Transportation ==
=== Rail ===
- Nankai Electric Railway
  - Koya Line: Hatsushiba Station - Hagiharatenjin Station - Kitanoda Station
