= Hatsushiba Station =

Railway station in Sakai, Japan

Hatsushiba Station 初芝駅
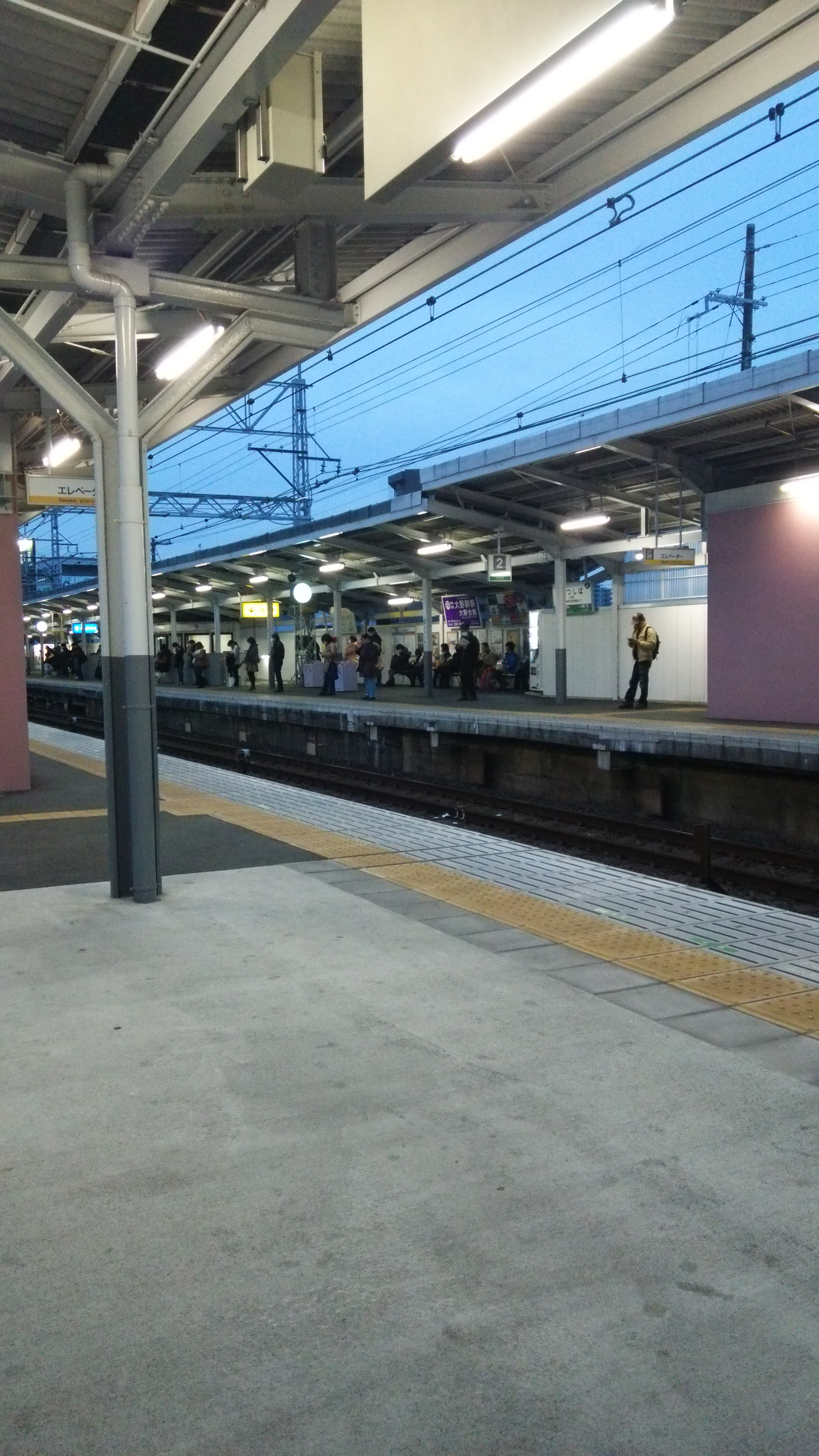
- Hatsushiba Station

General information
- Location: 1-4, Hikishōnishimachi 2-chome, Higashi-ku, Sakai-shi, Osaka-fu 599-8114; Japan
- Coordinates: 34°32′33″N 135°31′35″E
- Operator: Nankai Electric Railway
- Line: Koya Line
- Distance: 16.6 km from Shiomibashi
- Platforms: 2 side platforms
- Connections: Bus terminal

Other information
- Station code: NK61
- Website: Official website

History
- Opened: August 7, 1914
- Former names: Nishimura (until 1935)

Passengers
- 2019: 8,256 daily
Location
- Location within Osaka Prefecture Location within Japan

Hatsushiba Station (初芝駅, Hatsushiba-eki) is a passenger railway station located in Higashi-ku, Sakai, Osaka Prefecture, Japan, operated by the private railway operator Nankai Electric Railway. It has the station number "NK61".

== Lines ==
Hatsushiba Station is served by the Nankai Koya Line, and is 16.6 kilometers from the terminus of the line at Shiomibashi and 15.9 kilometers from Nanba.

== Layout ==
The station consists of two side platforms connected by an underground passage.

=== Platforms ===
1	■ Koya Line	for Koyasan
2	■ Koya Line	for Namba

== Adjacent stations ==
«	Service	»
Nankai Electric Railway Koya Line
Limited Express "Koya", "Rinkan": Does not stop at this station
Rapid Express: Does not stop at this station
Express: Does not stop at this station
Sub Express: Does not stop at this station
Shirasagi	Semi-Express for Namba	Hagiharatenjin
Shirasagi	Local	Hagiharatenjin

== History ==
Hatsushiba Station opened on January 30, 1898 as Nishimura Station (西村駅). It was renamed to its present name on August 1, 1935.

== Passenger statistics ==
In fiscal 2019, the station was used by an average of 8256 passengers daily.

== Surrounding area ==
- Osaka Prefectural Kanaoka High School
- Sakai City Hiokiso Junior High School
- Sakai City Hikisho Elementary School

== See also ==
- List of railway stations in Japan
