= Mozuhachiman Station =

Railway station in Sakai, Japan

Mozuhachiman Station 百舌鳥八幡駅
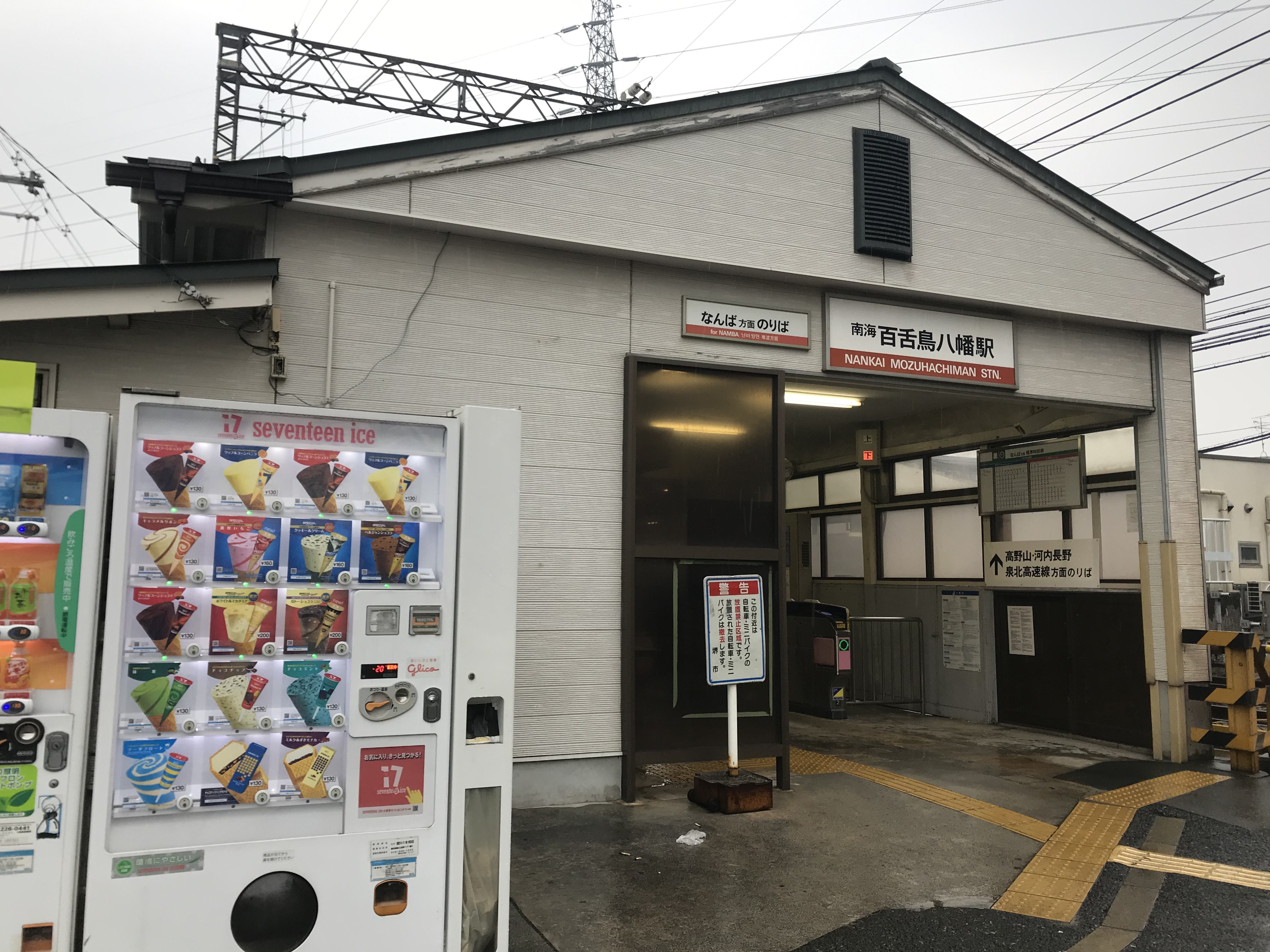
- Mozuhachiman Station, March 2019

General information
- Location: 12-17, Kōryōhigashimachi 2-chō, Sakai-ku, Sakai-shi, Osaka-fu 590-0025; Japan
- Coordinates: 34°33′38″N 135°29′55″E
- Operator: Nankai Electric Railway
- Line: Koya Line
- Distance: 13.4 km from Shiomibashi
- Platforms: 2 side platforms
- Connections

Other information
- Station code: NK58
- Website: Official website

History
- Opened: September 7, 1900

Passengers
- 2019: 4545 daily
Location
- Location within Osaka Prefecture Location within Japan

Mozuhachiman Station (百舌鳥八幡駅, Mozuhachiman-eki) is a passenger railway station located in Sakai-ku, Sakai, Osaka Prefecture, Japan, operated by the private railway operator Nankai Electric Railway. It has the station number "NK58".

== Lines ==
Mozuhachiman Station is served by the Nankai Kōya Line, and is 13.4 kilometers from the terminus of the line at Shiomibashi and 12.7 kilometers from Nanba.

== Layout ==
The station consists of two opposed side platforms connected by a footbridge.

=== Platforms ===
1	■ Kōya Line	for Koyasan
2	■ Kōya Line	for Namba

== Adjacent stations ==
«	Service	»
Nankai Electric Railway Kōya Line
Limited Express "Kōya", "Rinkan", "Semboku Liner": Does not stop at this station
Rapid Express: Does not stop at this station
Express: Does not stop at this station
Sub Express: Does not stop at this station
Mikunigaoka	Semi-Express	Nakamozu
Mikunigaoka	Local	Nakamozu

== History ==
Mozuhachiman Station opened on September 7, 1900.

== Passenger statistics ==
In fiscal 2019, the station was used by an average of 4,545 passengers daily.

== Surrounding area ==
- Mozuhachiman-gu
- Sakai City Sakai High School
- Seikeikai Medical College

== See also ==
- List of railway stations in Japan
