= Asaka Station (Osaka) =

Railway station in Sakai, Japan

Asaka Station 浅香駅
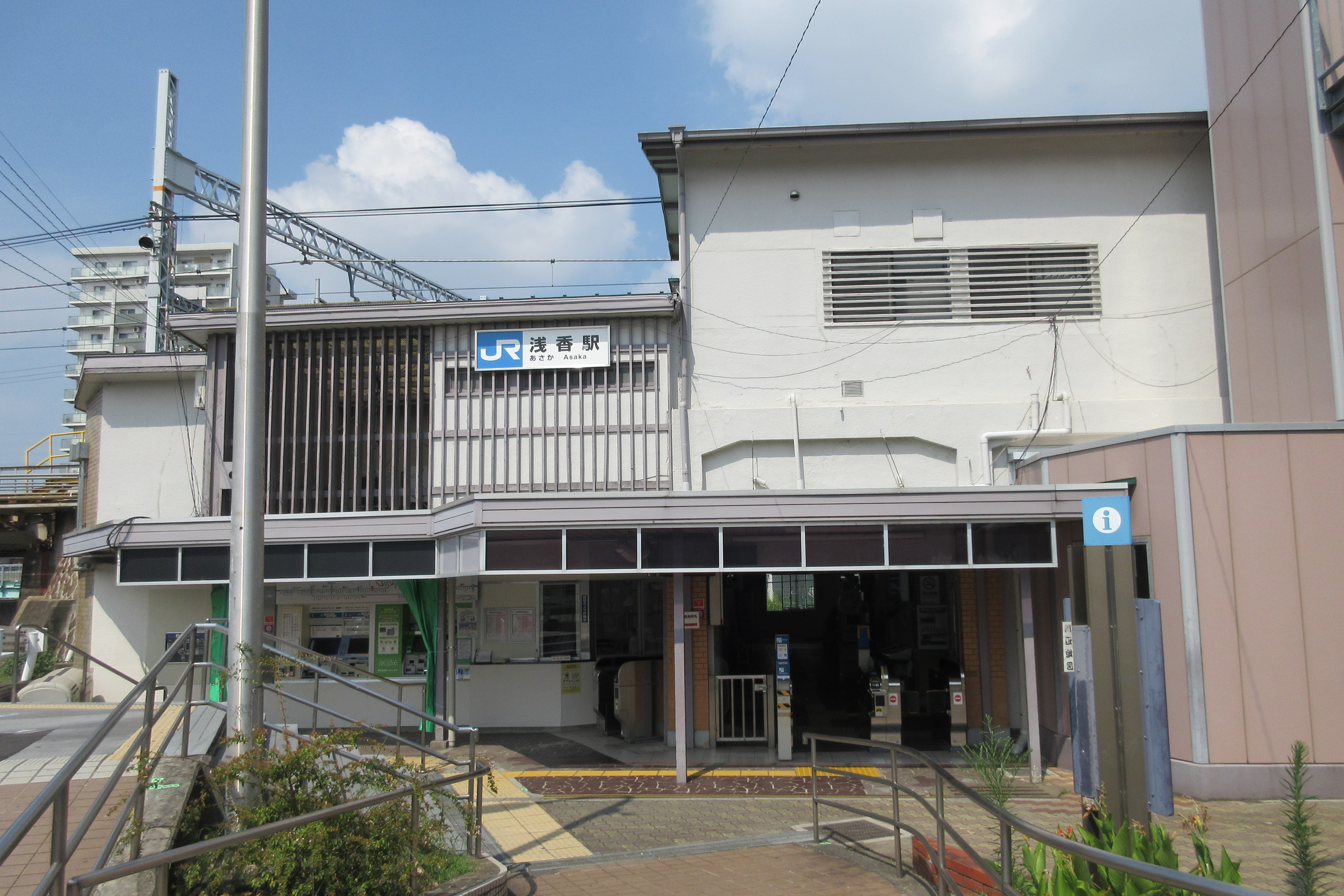
- Asaka Station, August 2018

General information
- Location: 9-1, Asakayamacho Sancho, Sakai-ku, Sakai-shi, Osaka 590-0012; Japan
- Coordinates: 34.5856°N 135.5022°E
- Owner: West Japan Railway Company
- Operator: West Japan Railway Company
- Line: R Hanwa Line
- Distance: 7.9 km (4.9 miles) from Tennōji
- Platforms: 2 side platforms
- Connections: Bus stop

Construction
- Structure type: Elevated (embankment)

Other information
- Status: Staffed
- Station code: JR-R27
- Website: Official website

History
- Opened: 3 September 1937
- Former names: Hanwa Asakayama (to 1941); Yamate Asakayama (to 1944)

Passengers
- FY2019: 2223 daily

Services
Preceding station	JR West	Following station
Sakaishi towards Wakayama	Hanwa Line Local	Sugimotocho towards Tennoji
Location
- Location within Osaka Prefecture Location within Japan

Asaka Station (浅香駅, Asaka-eki) is a passenger railway station in located in Sakai-ku, Sakai, Osaka Prefecture, Japan, operated by West Japan Railway Company (JR West).

== Lines ==
Asaka Station is served by the Hanwa Line, and is located 7.9 kilometers from the northern terminus of the line at Tennōji.

== Station layout ==
The station consists of two opposed side platforms connected by an elevated station building. The station is staffed.

=== Platforms ===
1	■ Hanwa Line	for Ōtori, Hineno and Wakayama
2	■ Hanwa Line	for Tennōji

== History ==
Asaka Station opened on September 3, 1937, as the Hanwa-Asakayama Stop (阪和浅香山停留場, Hanwa-Asaka Teiryujo). It was renamed Yamate-Asakayama Stop (山手浅香山停留場, Yamate-Asaka Teiryujo) on August 1, 1941, and to its present name on May 1, 1944. With the privatization of the Japan National Railways (JNR) on April 1, 1987, the station came under the aegis of the West Japan Railway Company.

Station numbering was introduced in March 2018 with Asaka being assigned station number JR-R27.

== Passenger statistics ==
In fiscal 2019, the station was used by an average of 2223 passengers daily (boarding passengers only).

== Surrounding area ==
- Yamato River
- Sakai Women's Junior College
- Kaorigaoka Liberte High School
- Sakai Liberal Junior and Senior High School
- Sakai City Asakayama Junior High School

== See also ==
- List of railway stations in Japan
