= Mozu Station =

Railway station in Sakai, Japan

Mozu Station 百舌鳥駅
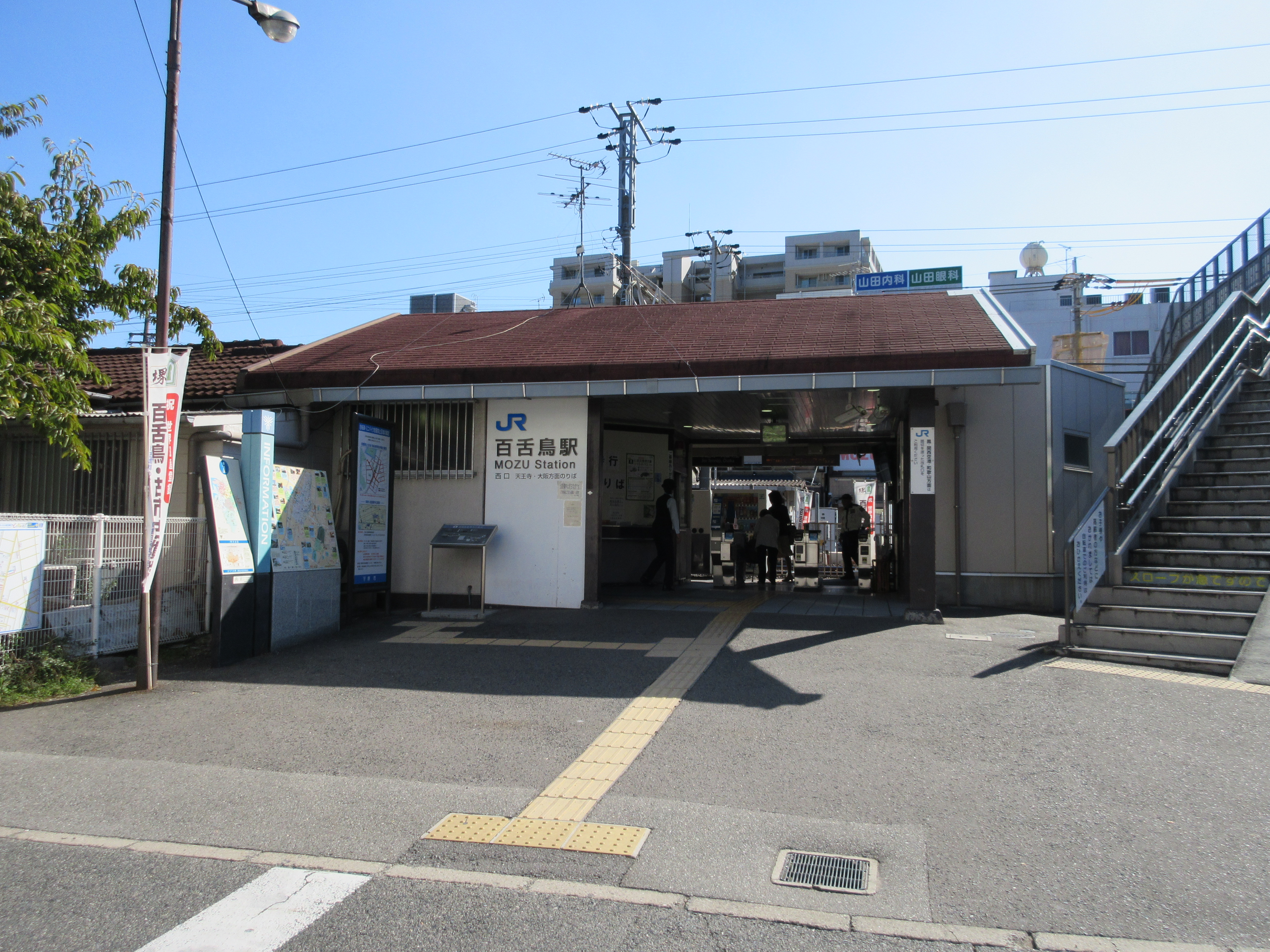
- Mozu Station West gate, May 2019

General information
- Location: 2 Chome Mozusekiun-cho, Sakai-ku, Sakai-shi, Osaka^fu 590-0802; Japan
- Coordinates: 34°33′30″N 135°29′20″E
- Owner: West Japan Railway Company
- Operator: West Japan Railway Company
- Line: R Hanwa Line
- Distance: 11.1 km (6.9 miles) from Tennōji
- Platforms: 2 side platforms
- Connections: Bus stop

Other information
- Status: Staffed
- Station code: JR-R30
- Website: Official website

History
- Opened: 18 July 1928
- Former names: Nintoku Goryo-mae (to 1938); Mozu Goryo-mae (to 1944)

Passengers
- FY2019: 3921 daily

Services
Preceding station	JR West	Following station
Uenoshiba towards Wakayama	Hanwa Line Local	Mikunigaoka towards Tennoji
Location
- Location within Osaka Prefecture Location within Japan

Mozu Station (百舌鳥駅, Mozu-eki) is a passenger railway station in located in Sakai-ku, Sakai, Osaka Prefecture, Japan, operated by West Japan Railway Company (JR West).

== Lines ==
Mozu Station is served by the Hanwa Line, and is located 11.1 kilometres (6.9 miles) from the northern terminus of the line at Tennōji.

== Station layout ==
The station consists of two opposed side platforms connected by a footbridge. The station is staffed.

=== Platforms ===
1	■ Hanwa Line	for Ōtori, Hineno and Wakayama
2	■ Hanwa Line	for Tennōji

== History ==
Asaka Station opened on 18 July 1929 as the Nintoku Goryo-mae Stop (仁徳御陵前停留場, Nintoku Goryo-mae Teiryujo). It was renamed Mozu Goryo-mae Stop (百舌鳥御陵前停留場, Mozu Goryo-mae Teiryujo) in May 1938 and to its present name on 1 May 1944. With the privatization of the Japan National Railways (JNR) on 1 April 1987, the station came under the aegis of the West Japan Railway Company.

Station numbering was introduced in March 2018 with Mozu being assigned station number JR-R30.

== Passenger statistics ==
In fiscal 2019, the station was used by an average of 3921 passengers daily (boarding passengers only).

== Surrounding area ==
- Mozu Tombs
- Sakai City Museum

== See also ==
- List of railway stations in Japan
