= Sakaishi Station =

Railway station in Sakai, Japan

Sakaishi Station 堺市駅
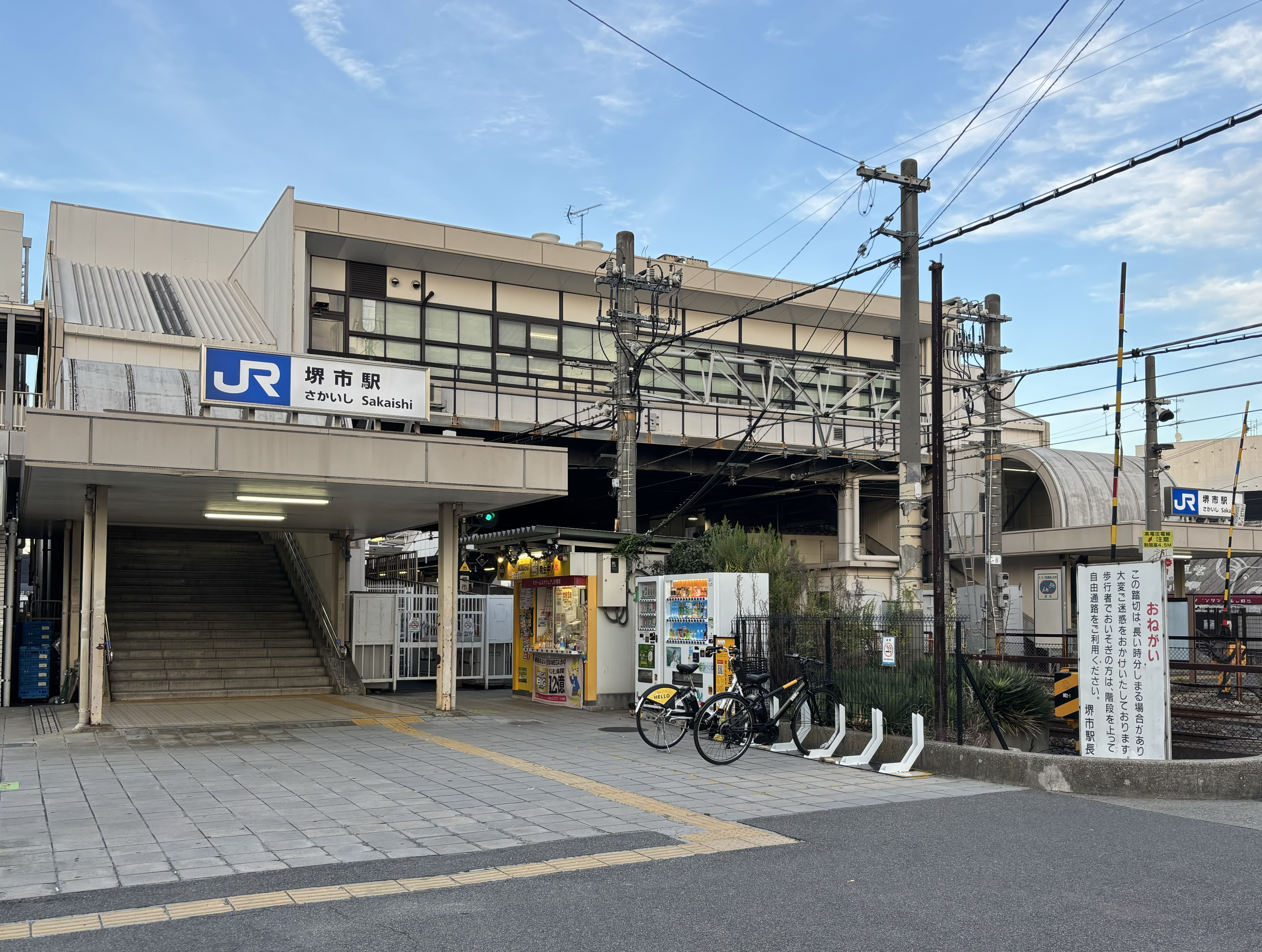
- Sakaishi Station, November 2024

General information
- Location: 1-1 Shinonome Nishimachi, Sakai-ku, Sakai-shi, Osaka- fu 590-0013; Japan
- Coordinates: 34°34′38″N 135°29′54″E
- Owner: West Japan Railway Company
- Operator: West Japan Railway Company
- Line: R Hanwa Line
- Distance: 8.8 km (5.5 miles) from Tennōji
- Platforms: 2 side platforms

Other information
- Status: Staffed (Midori no Madoguchi)
- Station code: JR-R28
- Website: Official website

History
- Opened: 2 February 1932
- Former names: Sakaishi (to 1941); Sakai-Kanaoka (to 1944); Kanaoka (to 1965)

Passengers
- FY2019: 12,047 daily
Location
- Location within Osaka Prefecture Location within Japan

Sakaishi Station (堺市駅, Sakaishi-eki) is a passenger railway station in located in Sakai-ku, Sakai, Osaka Prefecture, Japan, operated by West Japan Railway Company (JR West).

== Lines ==
Sakaishi Station is served by the Hanwa Line, and is located 8.8 kilometers from the northern terminus of the line at Tennōji.

== Station layout ==
The station consists of two opposed side platforms connected by an elevated station building. The station has a Midori no Madoguchi staffed ticket office.

=== Platforms ===
1	■ Hanwa Line	for Tennoji and Osaka
2	■ Hanwa Line	for Otori, Wakayama and Kansai Airport

== Adjacent stations ==
«	Service	»
Hanwa Line
Asaka	Local	Mikunigaoka
Tennoji	Regional Rapid Service	Mikunigaoka
Tennoji	Direct Rapid Service	Mikunigaoka
Tennoji	Rapid Service	Mikunigaoka
Tennoji	Kansai Airport Rapid Service; Kishuji Rapid Service	Mikunigaoka
Limited Express Kuroshio: Does not stop at this station
Kansai Airport Limited Express Haruka: Does not stop at this station

== History ==
Sakaishi Station opened on February 2, 1932, as the Sakaishi Stop (堺市停留場, Sakaishi Teiryujo), also known as the Hanwa-Sakaishi Stop (阪和堺停留場, Hanwa-Sakaishi Teiryujo). It was renamed the Sakai-Kanaoka Stop (堺金岡停留場場, Sakai-Kanaoka Teiryujo) on August 1, 1941, and to Kanaoka Station (金岡駅, Kanaoka eki) on May 1, 1944. It became Sakaishi Station on May 1, 1965. With the privatization of the Japan National Railways (JNR) on April 1, 1987, the station came under the aegis of the West Japan Railway Company.

Station numbering was introduced in March 2018 with Sakaishi being assigned station number JR-R28.

== Passenger statistics ==
In fiscal 2019, the station was used by an average of 12,047 passengers daily (boarding passengers only).

== Surrounding area ==
- Sakai City Cultural Center
- Sakai Alphonse Mucha Hall
- Osaka Health and Welfare Junior College
- Sakai City Nagao Junior High School
- Sakai City Mikunioka Junior High School

== See also ==
- List of railway stations in Japan
