= Shirasagi Station =

Railway station in Sakai, Japan

Shirasagi Station 白鷺駅
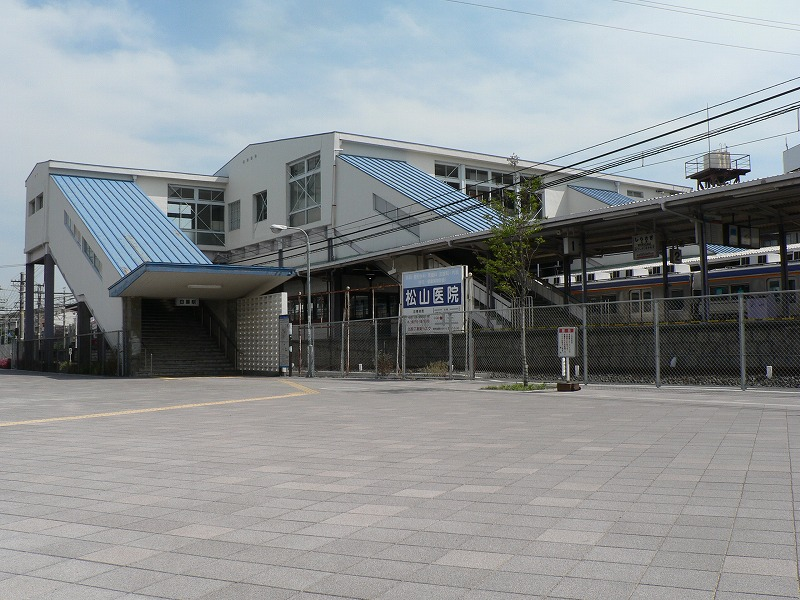
- Shirasagi Station North exit, April 2007

General information
- Location: 1150-1, Kanaokachō, Kita-ku, Sakai-shi, Osaka-fu 591-8022; Japan
- Coordinates: 34°33′01″N 135°30′48″E
- Operator: Nankai Electric Railway
- Line: Koya Line
- Distance: 15.1 km from Shiomibashi
- Platforms: 2 island platforms
- Tracks: 4

Other information
- Station code: NK60
- Website: Official website

History
- Opened: May 25, 1964

Passengers
- 2019: 10676 daily
Location
- Location within Osaka Prefecture Location within Japan

Shirasagi Station (白鷺駅, Shirasagi-eki) is a passenger railway station located in Kita-ku, Sakai, Osaka Prefecture, Japan, operated by the private railway operator Nankai Electric Railway. It has the station number "NK60".

== Lines ==
Shirasagi Station is served by the Nankai Koya Line, and is 15.1 kilometers from the terminus of the line at Shiomibashi and 14.4 kilometers from Nanba.

== Layout ==
The station consists of two island platforms with an elevated station building.

=== Platforms ===
1, 2	■ Koya Line	for Koyasan
3, 4	■ Koya Line	for Namba

== Adjacent stations ==
«	Service	»
Nankai Electric Railway Koya Line
Limited Express "Koya", "Rinkan": Does not stop at this station
Rapid Express: Does not stop at this station
Express: Does not stop at this station
Sub Express: Does not stop at this station
Nakamozu	Semi-Express	Hatsushiba
Nakamozu	Local	Hatsushiba

== History ==
Shirasagi Station opened on May 25, 1964.

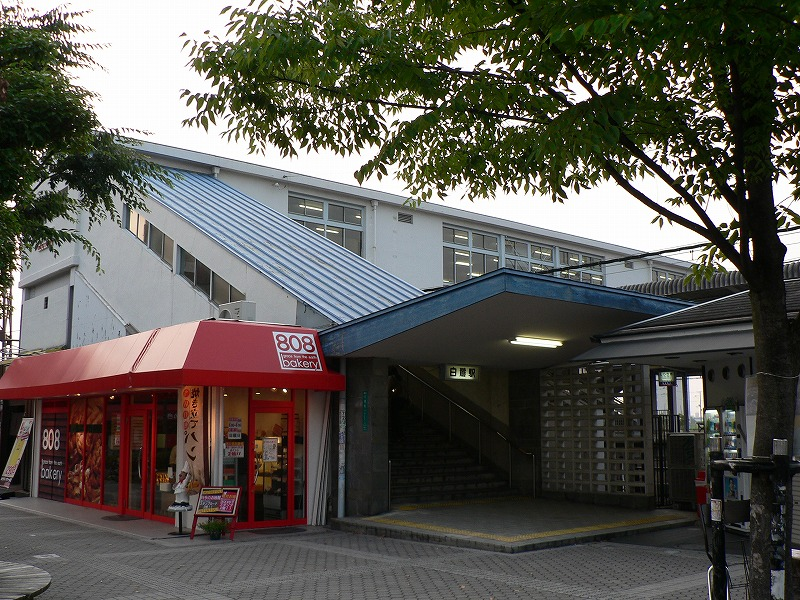
South exit

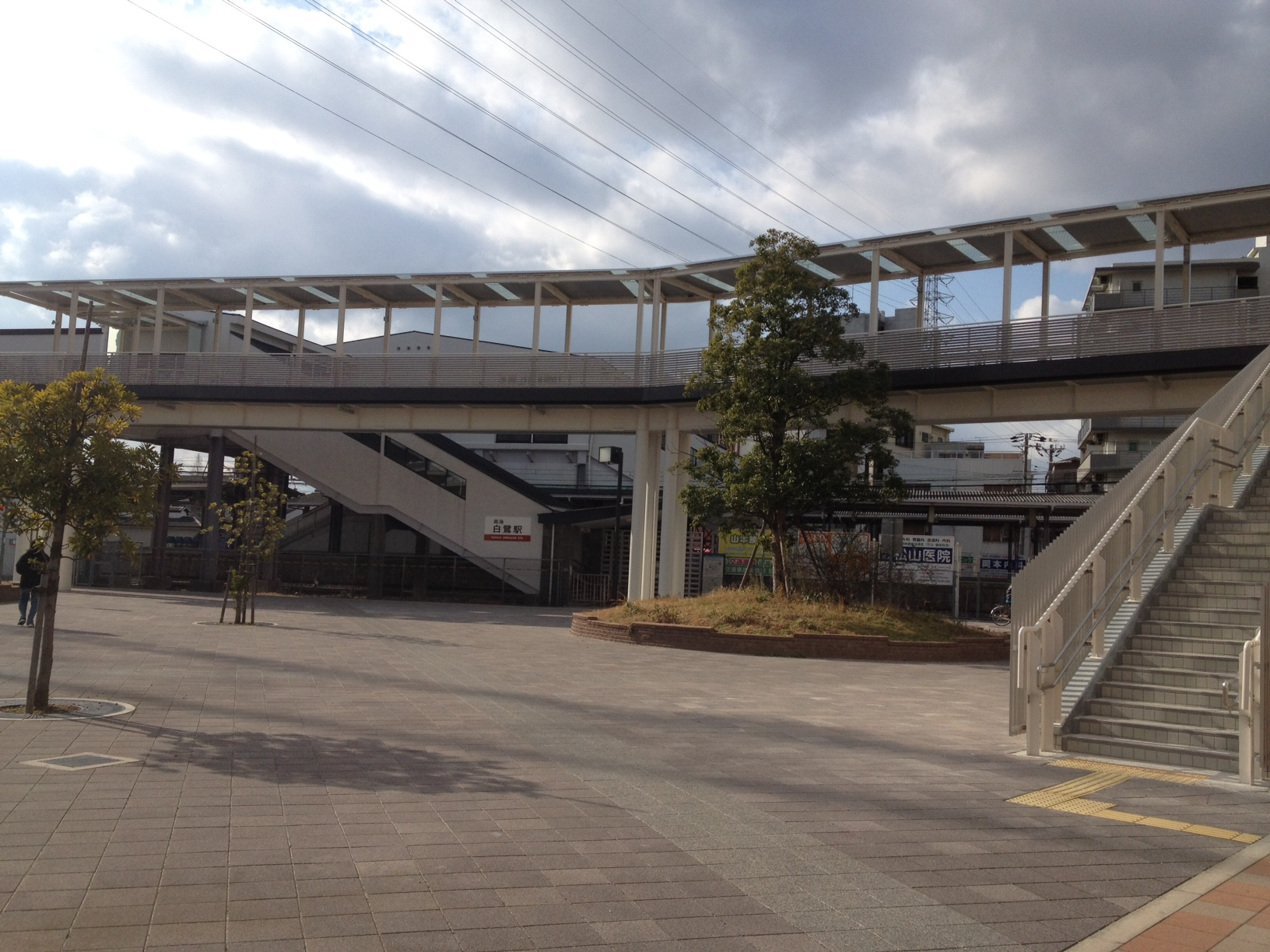
Pedway of north exit

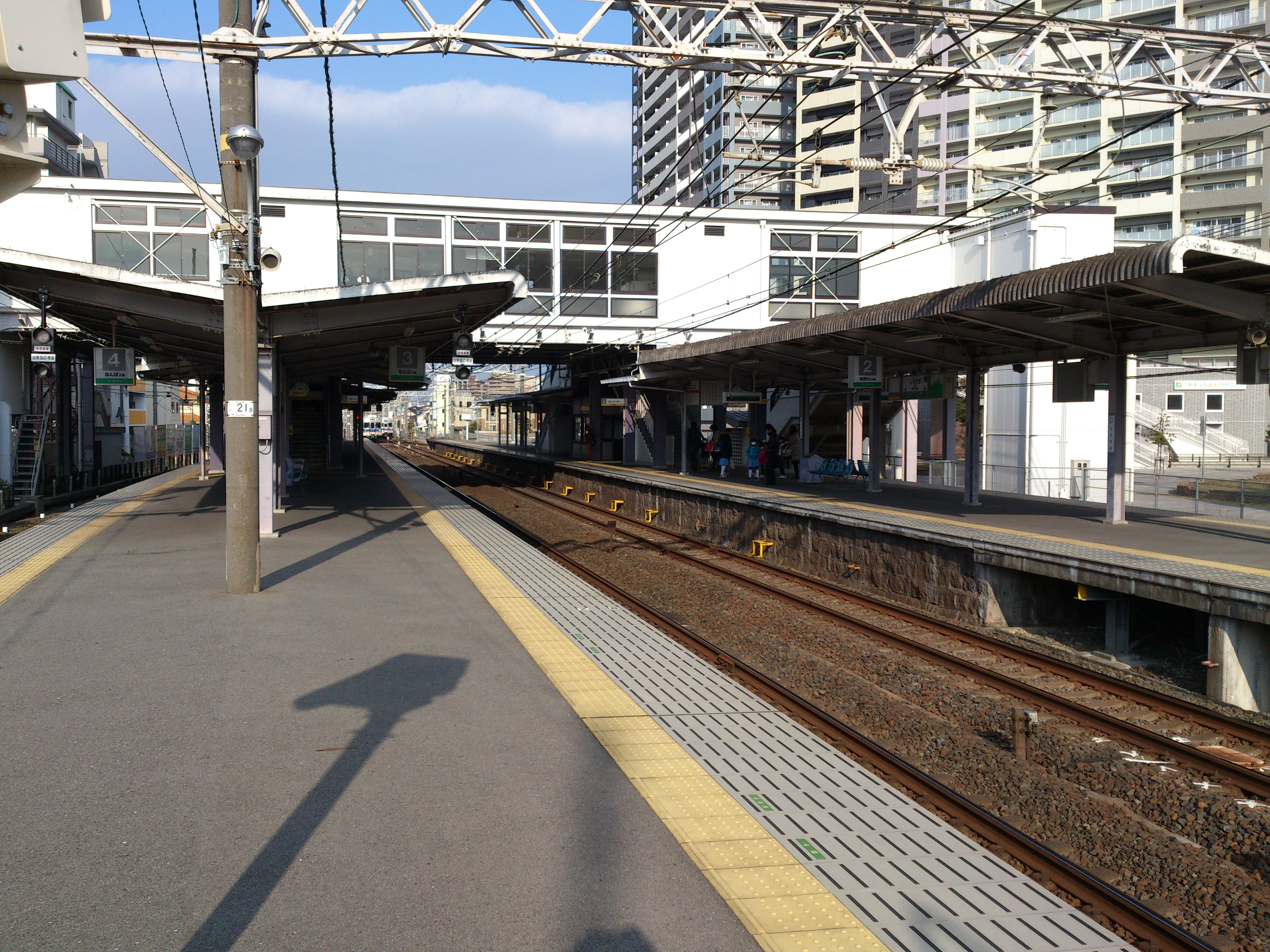
Platform

== Passenger statistics ==
In fiscal 2019, the station was used by an average of 10,676 passengers daily.

== Surrounding area ==
- Osaka Prefecture University
- Osaka Prefectural Higashi Mozu High School
- Sakai City Nakamozu Junior High School
- Sakai City Higashimozu Junior High School

== See also ==
- List of railway stations in Japan
