= Uenoshiba Station =

Railway station in Sakai, Japan

Uenoshiba Station 上野芝駅
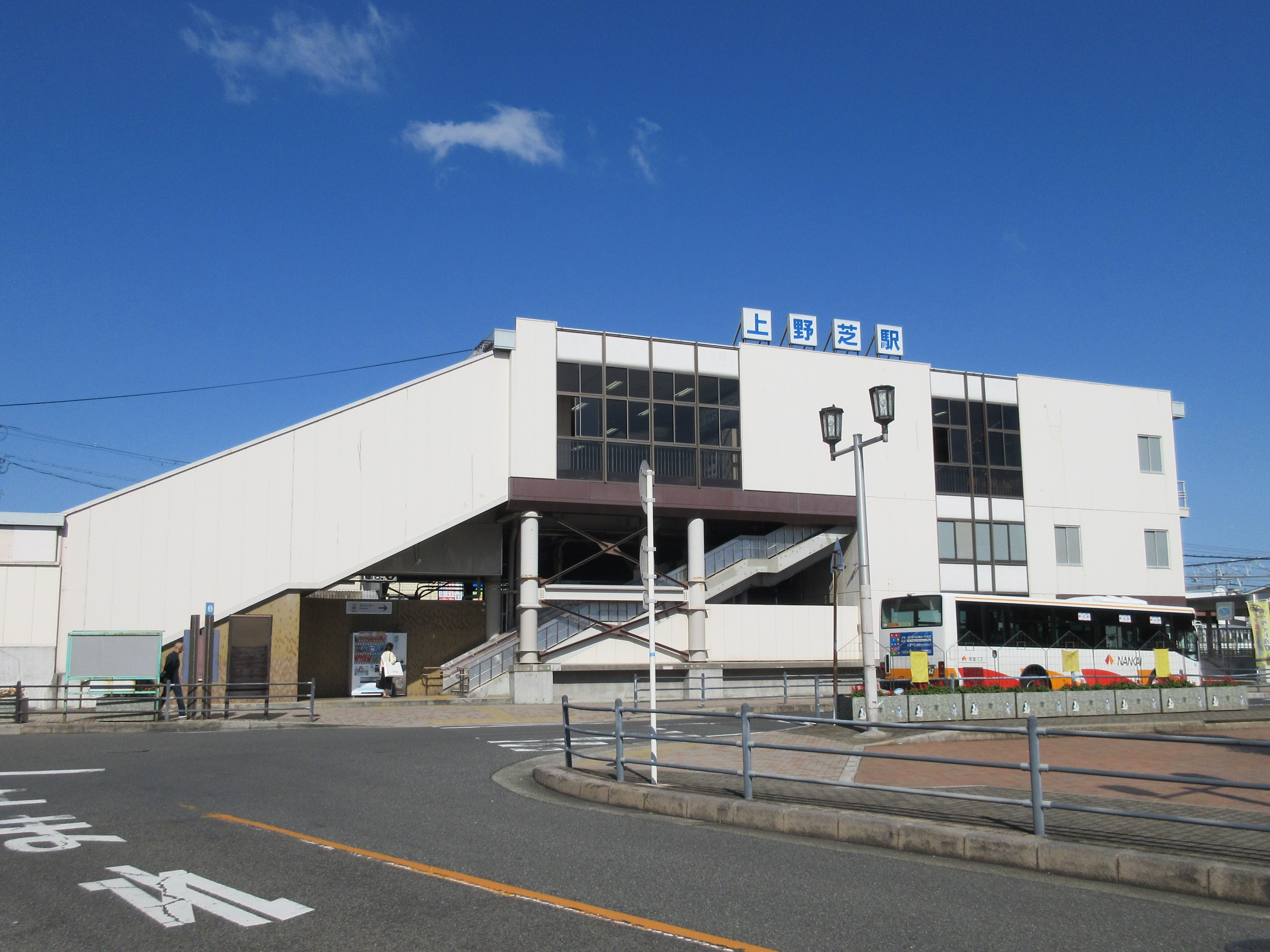
- Uenoshiba Station East gate, October 2018

General information
- Location: 1-1 Uenoshiba-cho-3chome, Nishi-ku, Sakai-shi, Osaka-fu 593-8301; Japan
- Coordinates: 34°32′59.45″N 135°28′42.74″E
- Owner: West Japan Railway Company
- Operator: West Japan Railway Company
- Line: R Hanwa Line
- Distance: 12.4 km (7.7 miles) from Tennōji
- Platforms: 2 side platforms
- Connections: Bus stop

Other information
- Status: Staffed
- Station code: JR-R31
- Website: Official website

History
- Opened: 18 July 1929

Passengers
- FY2019: 8759 daily

Services
Preceding station	JR West	Following station
Tsukuno towards Wakayama	Hanwa Line Local	Mozu towards Tennoji
Location
- Location within Osaka Prefecture Location within Japan

Uenoshiba Station (上野芝駅, Uenoshiba-eki) is a passenger railway station in located in Nishi-ku, Sakai, Osaka Prefecture, Japan, operated by West Japan Railway Company (JR West).

== Lines ==
Uenoshiba Station is served by the Hanwa Line, and is located 12.4 kilometres (7.7 miles) from the northern terminus of the line at Tennōji.

== Station layout ==
The station consists of two opposed side platforms connected by an elevated station building. The station is staffed.

=== Platforms ===
1	■ Hanwa Line	for Ōtori, Hineno and Wakayama
2	■ Hanwa Line	for Tennōji

== History ==
Uenoshiba Station opened on 18 July 1929. With the privatization of the Japan National Railways (JNR) on 1 April 1987, the station came under the aegis of the West Japan Railway Company.

Station numbering was introduced in March 2018 with Uenoshiba being assigned station number JR-R31.

== Passenger statistics ==
In fiscal 2019, the station was used by an average of 8701 passengers daily (boarding passengers only).

== Surrounding area ==
- Mozu Tombs
- Sakai City Uenoshiba Elementary School
- Osaka Prefectural Sakai Support School
- Osaka Prefectural Sakai Hearing Support School

== See also ==
- List of railway stations in Japan
