= Sumiyoshi Park =

Park in Osaka, Japan

Coordinates: 34.61240°N 135.48848°E

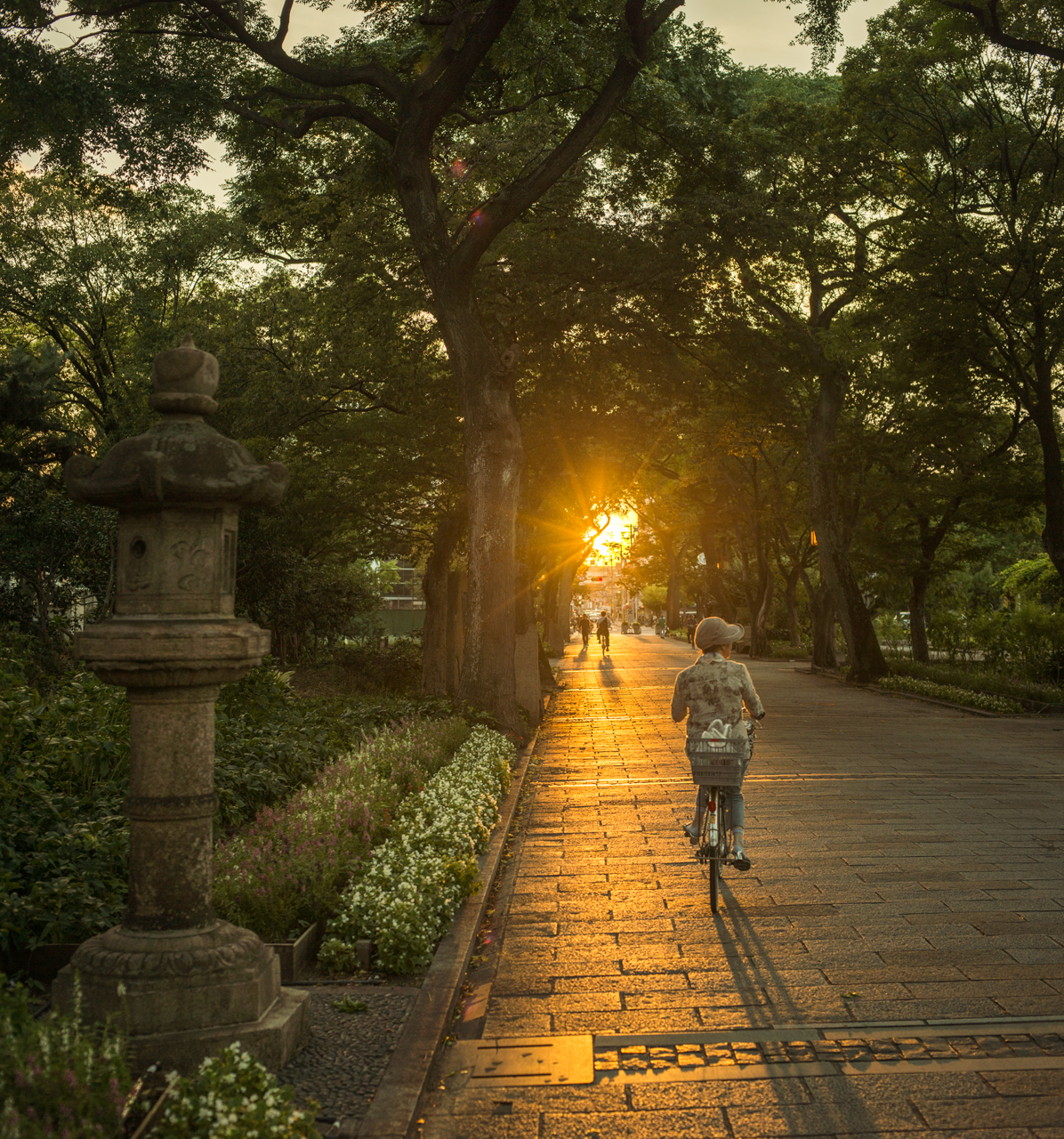
Sumiyoshi Park

Sumiyoshi Park (住吉公園 Sumiyoshi Kōen) is an Osaka prefectural park in Hamaguchi-higashi Itchome, Suminoe-ku, Osaka, Japan.

It was registered by Osaka Prefecture in 1873 with Hamadera Park in Nishi-ku, Sakai, and is the oldest park in Osaka.

== Access ==
- Nankai Railway Nankai Line: Sumiyoshitaisha Station
- Hankai Tramway Uemachi Line: Sumiyoshikoen Station
- Hankai Tramway Hankai Line: Sumiyoshi-toriimae Station
