= Abeno =

Abeno (written: 阿倍野 or 阿部野) may refer to:

- Abeno Harukas (あべのハルカス), Japanese commercial facility
- Abeno-ku, Osaka (阿倍野区), ward of Osaka, Japan
- Abeno Plain (阿倍野 or 阿部野), ancient name for a landform in Osaka Prefecture, Japan
- Abeno Station (阿倍野駅, Abeno-eki), railway station in Osaka, Japan

== People with the surname ==
- Chako Abeno (阿倍野 ちゃこ), Japanese manga artist
