= Sumiyoshi Station =

Sumiyoshi Station (住吉駅, Sumiyoshi-eki) refers to the following railway stations in Japan:

- Sumiyoshi Station (Hanshin) (ja:住吉駅 (阪神)) in Higashinada-ku, Kobe on the Hanshin Electric Railway Main Line
- Sumiyoshi Station (JR West) (ja:住吉駅 (JR西日本)) in Higashinada-ku, Kobe on the JR West Tokaido Main Line (JR Kobe Line) and the Kobe New Transit Rokko Island Line
- Sumiyoshi Station (Kumamoto) (ja:住吉駅 (熊本県)) in Uto, Kumamoto, on the JR Kyushu Misumi Line
- Sumiyoshi Station (Nagasaki) (ja:住吉駅 (長崎県)) in Nagasaki on the Nagasaki Electric Tramway
- Sumiyoshi Station (Osaka) (ja:住吉駅 (大阪府)) in Sumiyoshi-ku, Osaka on the Hankai Tramway Hankai Line and Uemachi Line.
- Sumiyoshi Station (Tokyo) (ja:住吉駅 (東京都)) in Kōtō-ku, Tokyo on the Toei Shinjuku Line and the Tokyo Metro Hanzomon Line

== See also ==
- Motosumiyoshi Station
