= Sumiyoshi =

Sumiyoshi (Japanese: 住吉) may refer to:

- Sumiyoshi (name)
- Sumiyoshi taisha (住吉大社), Shinto shrine in Osaka, Japan
- Sumiyoshi-ku, Osaka (住吉区), ward of Osaka, Japan
- Sumiyoshi Park (住吉公園), prefectural park in Osaka, Japan
- Sumiyoshi Station (disambiguation) (住吉駅, Sumiyoshi-eki), multiple train stations in Japan
- Sumiyoshi sanjin, generic name for three Shinto gods of the sea
- Sumiyoshi-zukuri, Shinto architectural style
