= Higashi-Tengachaya Station =

Tram station in Osaka, Japan

Higashi-Tengachaya Station 東天下茶屋駅
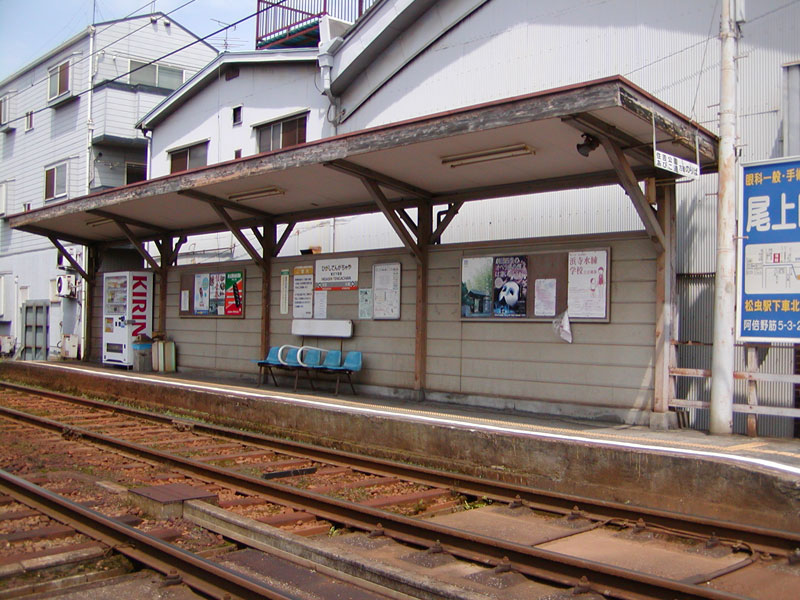

General information
- Location: 3, Abeno-motomachi; 12, Seimei-dōri; Abeno, Osaka, Osaka （大阪市阿倍野区阿倍野元町3・晴明通12） Japan
- Coordinates: 34°37′57.5″N 135°30′30.48″E
- Operator: Hankai Tramway
- Line: Uemachi Line

Other information
- Station code: HN04

History
- Opened: 1900
Location

Higashi-Tengachaya Station (東天下茶屋駅, Higashi-Tengachaya Eki; station number: HN04) is a tramway stop in Abeno-ku, Osaka, Japan on the Hankai Tramway Uemachi Line.

== Layout ==
A side platform is located on each track, before passing the tramway crossing (Seimei-dōri).

northbound	■ Uemachi Line	for Tennōji-ekimae
southbound	■ Uemachi Line	for Sumiyoshi and Sumiyoshikōen (Hankai Line) for Sumiyoshi, Abikomichi, and Hamadera-ekimae

== Adjacent stations ==
«	Service	»
Uemachi Line (HN04)
Matsumushi (HN03)	-	Kitabatake (HN05)
