= Higashi-Kohama Station =

Tram station in Osaka, Japan

Coordinates: 34°37′6.1″N 135°29′33.6″E

Higashi-Kohama Station 東粉浜駅
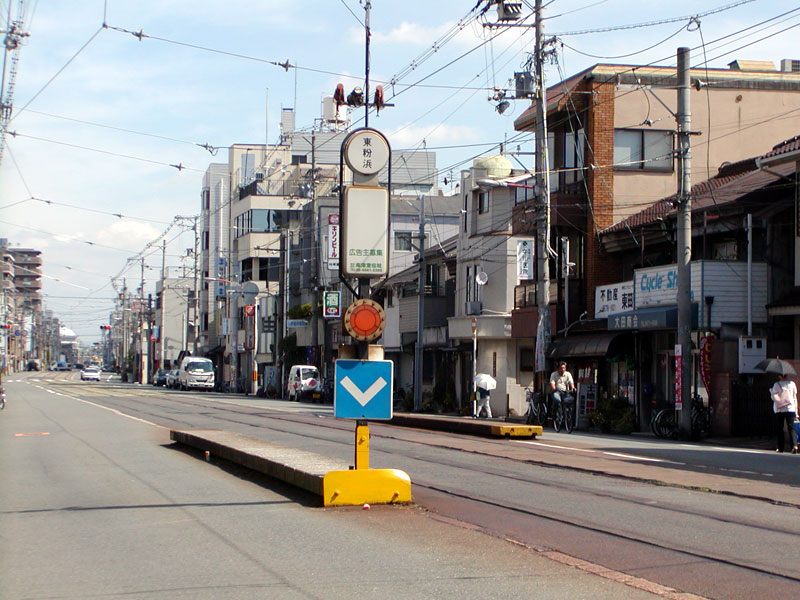

General information
- Location: Sumiyoshi, Osaka, Osaka; Japan
- Operator: Hankai Tramway
- Line: Hankai Line

History
- Opened: 1911-12-01
Location

Higashi-Kohama Station (東粉浜駅, Higashi-Kohama Eki) is a tram stop in Sumiyoshi-ku, Osaka, Japan on the Hankai Tramway Hankai Line. The station is about 10m east from Kohama Station on the Nankai Main Line.

== History ==
- 1911-12-01: Higashi-Kohama Station opens with the opening of the Hankai Tramway
- 1915-06-21: Hankai Tramway merges with Nankai Railway, and Higashi-Kohama Station becomes a station of the merged company
- 1944-06-01: After another company merger, Higashi-Kohama Station becomes a station of Kinki Nippon Railway
- 1947-06-01: The line (along with the station) is transferred to Nankai Electric Railway
- 1980-12-01: The line (along with the station) is transferred to Hankai Tramway

== Station and platforms ==
In order to handle two trains simultaneously, Higashi-Kohama Station is a single island platform with a track on each side.

=== Environs ===
The Sumiyoshi Higashi-Kohama Post Office is located about 100m southwest of Higashi-Kohama Station. Osaka Municipal Higashi-Kohama Elementary School is about 200m northeast of the station, with Sumiyoshi Junior High School and Sumiyoshi Elementary School just beyond that. Japan National Route 26 is accessible about 300m west of the station, and Osaka Prefectural Route 5 (Osakakō-Yao Route) is about 550m north.

== Adjacent stations ==
←	Service	→
Tsukanishi Station	Hankai Line	Sumiyoshi Station
