= Sumiyoshitaisha Station =

Railway station in Osaka, Japan

Sumiyoshitaisha Station 住吉大社駅
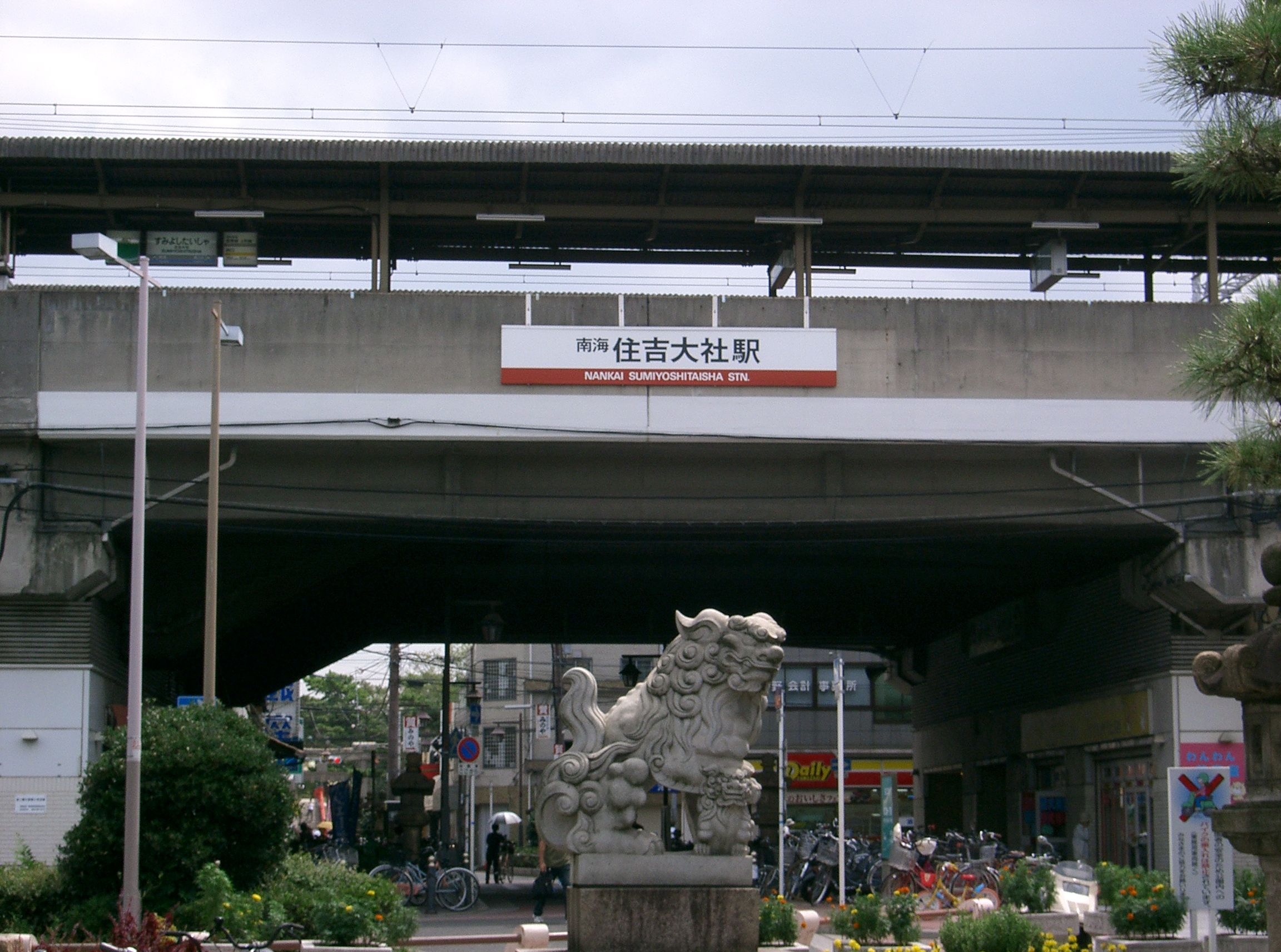
- Sumiyoshitaisha Station in September 2007

General information
- Location: Nagaochō, Sumiyoshi, Osaka （大阪市住吉区長峡町） Osaka Prefecture; Japan
- Coordinates: 34°36′46.05″N 135°29′24.72″E
- System: Train station
- Operator: Nankai Electric Railway
- Line: Nankai Main Line
- Platforms: 2 island platforms
- Connections: Bus stop

Construction
- Structure type: Elevated

Other information
- Station code: NK08
- Website: Official website

History
- Opened: December 1885; 140 years ago
- Former names: Sumiyoshikōen (until 1979)

Passengers
- 2019: 9,020 daily
Location
- Location within Japan

Sumiyoshitaisha Station (住吉大社駅, Sumiyoshitaisha-eki) is a train station on the Nankai Main Line in Nagaochō, Sumiyoshi-ku, Osaka, Osaka Prefecture, Japan, currently operated by the private railway operator Nankai Electric Railway.

The station opened in 1885 as Sumiyoshi Station, operated by Hankai Railway. The name was later changed to Sumiyoshikoen, and finally to its current name in 1979. From 1913 to 2016 the station was also home to the terminus on the Hankai Uemachi Line.

== Lines ==
Sumiyoshitaisha Station is served by the Nankai Main Line, and has the station number "NK08".

== Layout ==
=== Sumiyoshitaisha Station ===
Sumiyoshitaisha Station has two island platforms serving two tracks each on the third level. Tracks 2 and 4 are used for sub express trains and airport express trains from January 1 till 3 every year. During the period, station staff tell passengers that trains approaching to Tracks 2 and 4, as automatic announcement system is installed for Tracks 1 and 3 only.

1	■ Nankai Line	for Wakayamashi and Kansai Airport
2	■ Nankai Line	extra (on off-peak hours from January 1 till 3 every year)
3	■ Nankai Line	for Namba
4	■ Nankai Line	extra (on off-peak hours from January 1 till 3 every year)

=== Sumiyoshikōen Station (closed) ===
Sumiyoshikoen Station 住吉公園駅
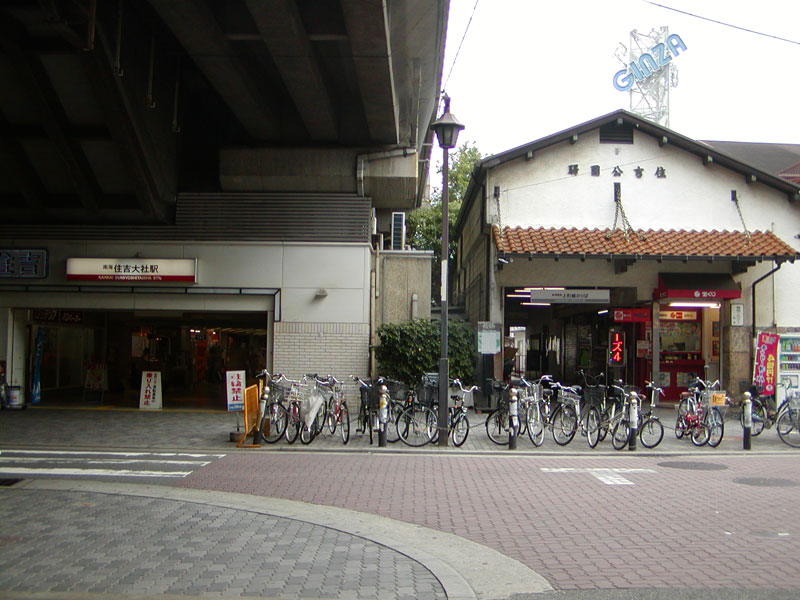
- Sumiyoshikōen Station (right) and entrance of Sumiyoshitaisha Station (left)

General information
- Location: Nagaochō, Sumiyoshi-ku, Osaka （大阪市住吉区長峡町） Osaka Prefecture; Japan
- Coordinates: 34°36′47.08″N 135°29′26.03″E
- System: Tram stop
- Operator: Hankai Tramway
- Line: ■ Uemachi Line
- Platforms: 2 side platforms

Other information
- Station code: HN11

History
- Opened: 1913
- Closed: 31 January 2016
Location

Previously there was a connection to Sumiyoshikōen Station (住吉公園駅, Sumiyoshikōen-eki) on the Hankai Tramway Uemachi Line. That station (which had two dead-end platforms serving two tracks at ground level) was closed in 2016.

1, 2	■ Uemachi Line	for Abeno and Tennoji-ekimae

When it opened in 1913, Sumiyoshikōen Station was the terminal of the Uemachi Line. There were approximately 200 trams departing from the station in its peak in circa 1960. Hankai later extended the Uemachi Line, and the Sumiyoshikōen section became a branch. Eventually, the number of departures was reduced to five (four in weekends) at the March 2014 timetable revision, serving 70 to 100 passengers per day. The station, as well as the 200-meter branch line between Sumiyoshi and Sumiyoshikōen, was closed from 31 January 2016.

The Uemachi Line is still in service, with a street platform (Sumiyoshitoriimae) approximately 70 meters to the east of the former Sumiyoshikōen Station.

- Hankai Tramway (HN11)
  - Uemachi Line

== Adjacent stations ==
«	Service	»
Nankai Railway Nankai Main Line (NK08: Sumiyoshitaisha)
Kohama (NK07)	Local (普通車)	Suminoe (NK09)
Semi-Express (only running for Namba on weekday mornings): Does not stop at this station
Sub. Express: Does not stop at this station
Airport Express: Does not stop at this station
Express: Does not stop at this station
Limited Express ("rapi:t", "Southern"): Does not stop at this station
Hankai Tramway Uemachi Line (HN11: Sumiyoshikōen)
Sumiyoshi (HN10)	-	Terminus

== Surrounding area ==
- Sumiyoshi Taisha
- Osaka Prefectural Sumiyoshi Park
- Sumiyoshi-toriimae Station (HN12, Hankai Tramway Hankai Line)

== See also ==
- List of railway stations in Japan
