= Abeno-ku =

Ward of Osaka, Japan

Coordinates: 34°38′20.3″N 135°31′6.57″E

Abeno-ku in Osaka

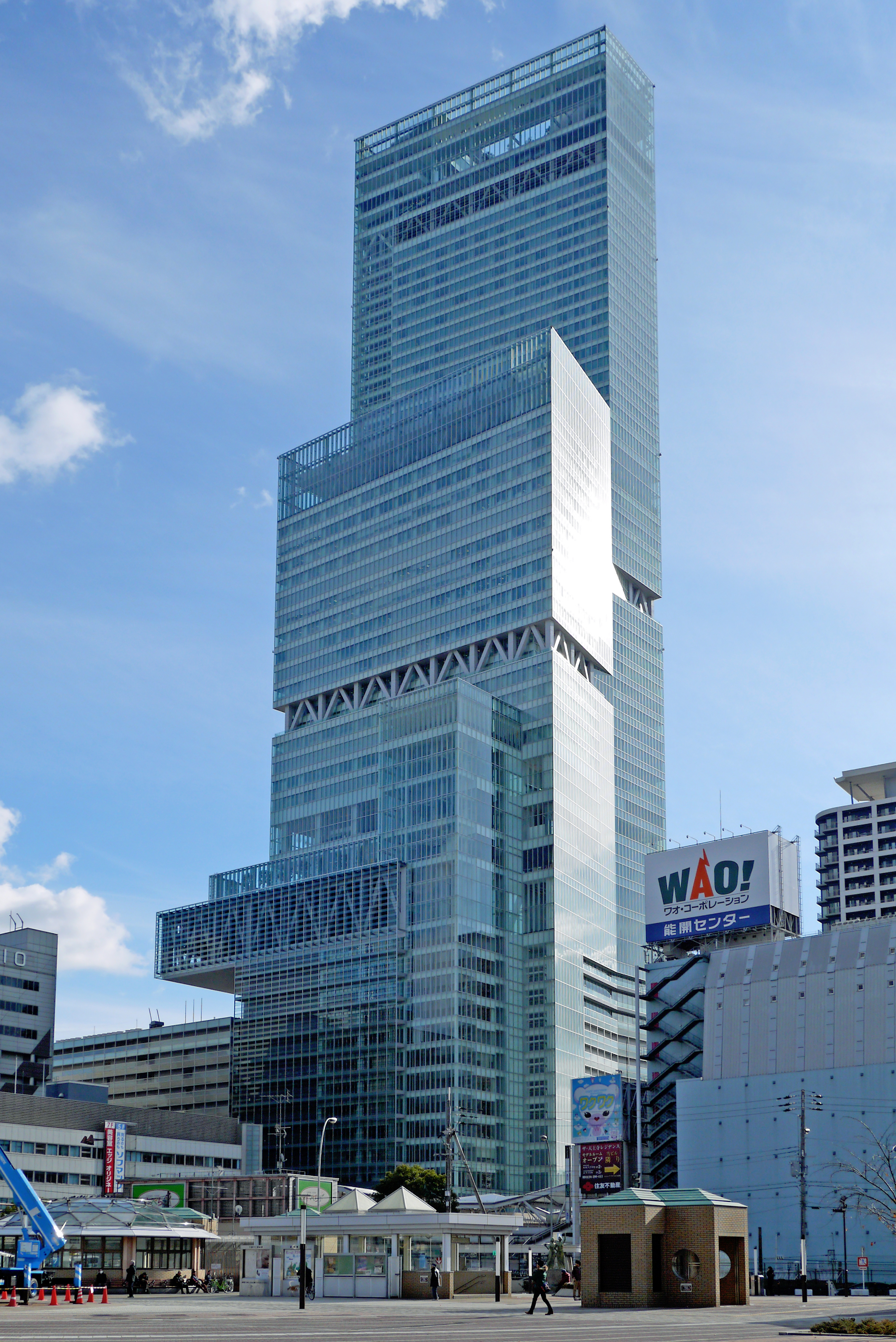
Abeno Harukas

Abeno-ku (阿倍野区) is one of 24 wards of Osaka, Japan. It is located in southern Osaka city and has a population of over 107,000. In the northern part of Abeno, Abenobashi, there is the Kintetsu Minami Osaka Line which terminates at Abenobashi Station, the Midōsuji Line and Tanimachi Line of the Osaka Municipal Subway at Tennoji Station, and the Hankai Tramway's Uemachi Line which terminates at Tennoji-eki-mae Station. The Abenobashi area of Abeno is a commercial area where department stores and movie theatres are located. Abeno is a home for Sharp Corporation (Nagaike-cho).

== History ==
When Osaka city increased its number of wards from 15 to 22 on April 1, 1943, Sumiyoshi ward was divided into three "new" wards, one of which was Abeno, the others being the Higashi-Sumiyoshi and Sumiyoshi wards. There are varying theories as to the origin of the name "Abeno". One is that it was the name of a powerful family-clan in ancient Japan, Abe; another suggests it might come from one of Yamabe no Akahito's songs in the Man'yōshū, and another theory suggests it might come from the "amabe" in Higashi-narigun-amabe-gou, an ancient place name. The theory of the powerful family-clan name holds strongest.

== Train stations located in Abeno-ku ==
- West Japan Railway Company (JR West)
  - Hanwa Line: Bishoen Station - Minami-Tanabe Station - Tsurugaoka Station
- Kintetsu Railway
  - Minami Osaka Line: Osaka Abenobashi Station - Koboreguchi Station
- Hankai Tramway
  - Uemachi Line: Tennoji-eki-mae Station - Abeno Station - Matsumushi Station - Higashi-Tengachaya Station - Kitabatake Station - Himematsu Station
- Osaka Metro
  - Midōsuji Line: Tennoji Station - Showacho Station - Nishitanabe Station
  - Tanimachi Line: Abeno Station - Fuminosato Station

== Education ==
College

- Osaka Christian College
- Osaka City University College of Nursing
- Osaka Municipal College of Design
- St. Andrew's University (Momoyama Gakuin University) Abeno Campus
- Osaka Metropolitan University Abeno Campus
- Osaka University of Arts Sky Campus
- Aino University Junior College Abeno Campus

Private schools

- Abeno Shogaku High School (formerly Osaka Girls' Senior High School)
- Ohtani Junior and Senior High School

== See also ==
- Abeno Shrine
