= Hamaderakōen Station =

Railway station in Sakai, Japan

Hamaderakōen Station 浜寺公園駅
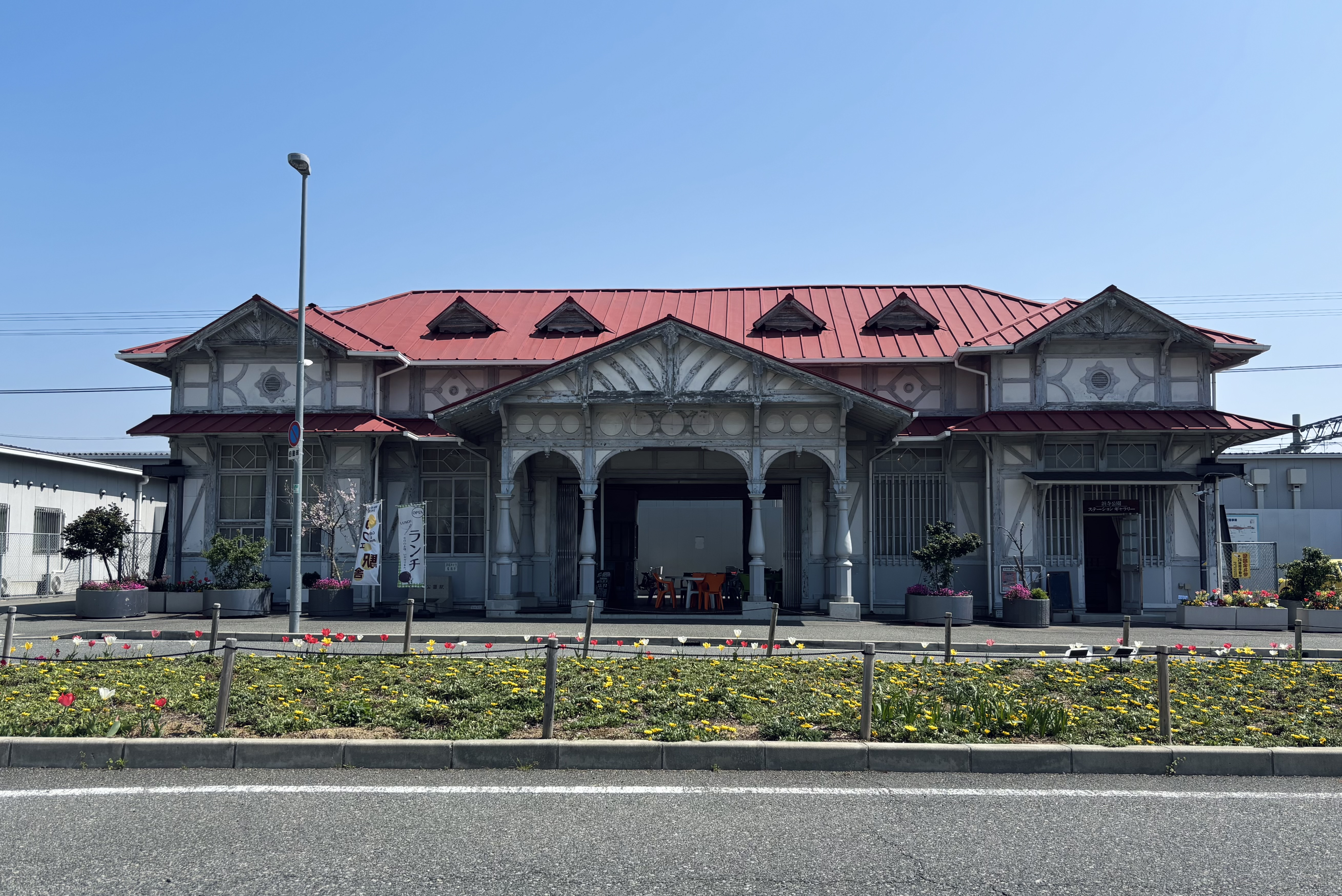
- Hamaderakōen Station old building in April 2026

General information
- Location: 188, Hamaderakōen-cho 2-cho, Nishi-ku, Sakai-shi, Osaka-fu 592-8346; Japan
- Coordinates: 34°32′27″N 135°26′40″E
- Operator: Nankai Electric Railway
- Line: Nankai Main Line
- Platforms: 1 island + 2 side platforms

Other information
- Station code: NK15
- Website: Official website

History
- Opened: 1 October 1897; 128 years ago
- Rebuilt: 1907; 119 years ago
- Former names: Hamadera (until 1907)

Passengers
- 2019: 4274 daily
Location
- Location within Osaka Prefecture Location within Japan

Hamaderakōen Station (浜寺公園駅, Hamaderakōen-eki) is a passenger railway station located in Nishi-ku, Sakai, Osaka, Japan, operated by the private railway operator Nankai Electric Railway. It has the station number "NK15".

== Lines ==
Hamaderakōen Station is served by the Nankai Main Line, and is 14.8 kilometers from the terminus of the line at Nanba.

== Layout ==
The station consists of an island platform for Wakayamashi and Kansai Airport serving two tracks, and a side platform for Namba serving two tracks which Track 4 was used for the trains returning at this station to Namba.The station building was rebuilt by Kingo Tatsuno in 1907 and is a Registered Tangible Cultural Property.

=== Platforms ===
| 1, 2 | ■ Nankai Line | for Wakayamashi and (■ Airport Line) Kansai Airport |
| 3 | ■ Nankai Line | for Namba (south of the side platform, usually used) |
| 4 | ■ Nankai Line | for Namba (north of the side platform, used during rush hour) |

== Adjacent stations ==
| « | Service | » |
Nankai Main Line (NK15)
| Suwanomori (NK14) | Local (普通車) | Hagoromo (NK16) |
| Suwanomori (NK14) | Semi-Express (only running for Namba on weekday mornings) | Hagoromo (NK16) |
Sub. Express: Does not stop at this station
Airport Express: Does not stop at this station
Express: Does not stop at this station
Limited Express "Rapi:t α" (only running for Kansai Airport on weekdays): Does not stop at this station
Limited Express "Rapi:t β": Does not stop at this station
Limited Express "Southern": Does not stop at this station

== History ==
Hamaderakōen Station opened on 1 October 1897 as Hamadera Station (浜寺駅). It was rebuilt and renamed to its present name on 20 August 1907

== Passenger statistics ==
In fiscal 2019, the station was used by an average of 4274 passengers daily.

== Connections ==
- Hankai Tramway Hankai Line (HN31: Hamadera-ekimae Station, for Abikomichi, Ebisucho and Tennoji-ekimae) - 150 m west from Hamaderakōen Station

== Surrounding area ==
- Hamadera Park
- Fukueido
- Hamadera Central Hospital

== See also ==
- List of railway stations in Japan
