= Suminoe Station =

Railway station in Osaka, Japan

Suminoe Station 住ノ江駅
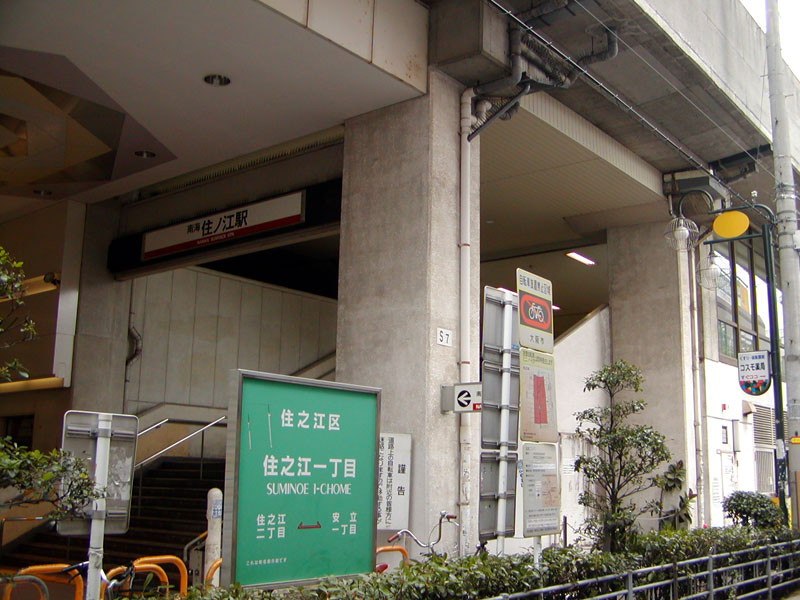
- Suminoe Station entrance in 2008

General information
- Location: 1-1-41, Nishi-Suminoe, Suminoe, Osaka （大阪市住之江区西住之江1丁目1番41号） Osaka Prefecture; Japan
- Coordinates: 34°36′18.77″N 135°29′13.1″E
- Operator: Nankai Electric Railway
- Line: Nankai Main Line
- Platforms: 2 island platforms
- Connections: Bus stop

Construction
- Structure type: Elevated

Other information
- Station code: NK09
- Website: Official website

History
- Opened: August 1907; 119 years ago
- Electrified: Yes

Passengers
- FY2023: 10,947 daily
Location
- Location within Japan

Suminoe Station (住ノ江駅, Suminoe-eki) is a train station on the Nankai Main Line in Suminoe-ku, Osaka, Osaka Prefecture, Japan, operated by the private railway operator Nankai Electric Railway.

== Lines ==
Suminoe Station is served by the Nankai Main Line, and has the station number "NK09".

== Layout ==
The station has two elevated island platforms serving two tracks each. Suminoe Depot is located in the west of the station.

1	■ Nankai Line	for Wakayamashi and Kansai Airport
2	■ Nankai Line	for Wakayamashi and Kansai Airport (passing trains only)
3	■ Nankai Line	for Namba
4	■ Nankai Line	for Namba (regularly for passing trains, part of local trains depart there)

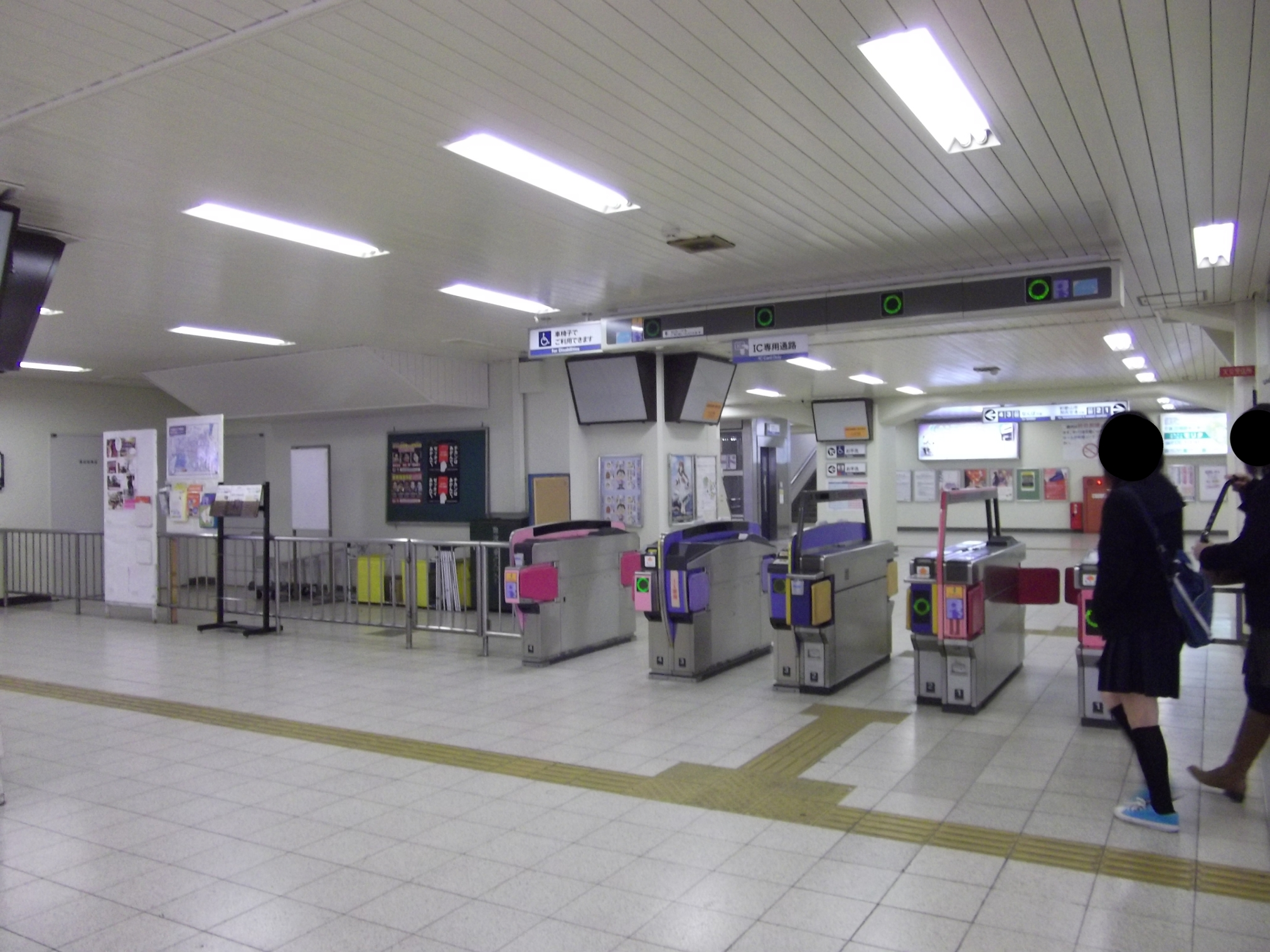
Ticket gates

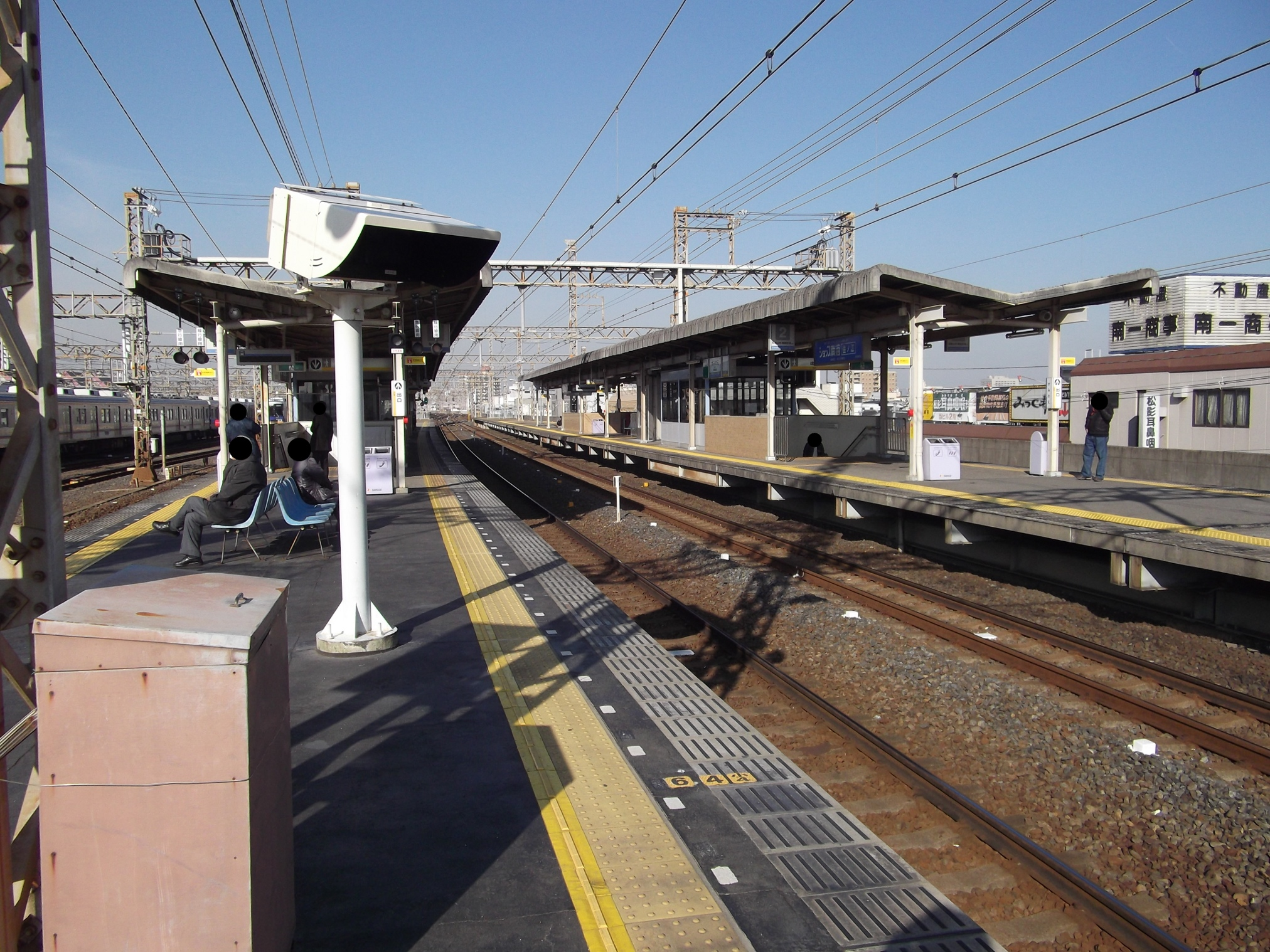
Platforms

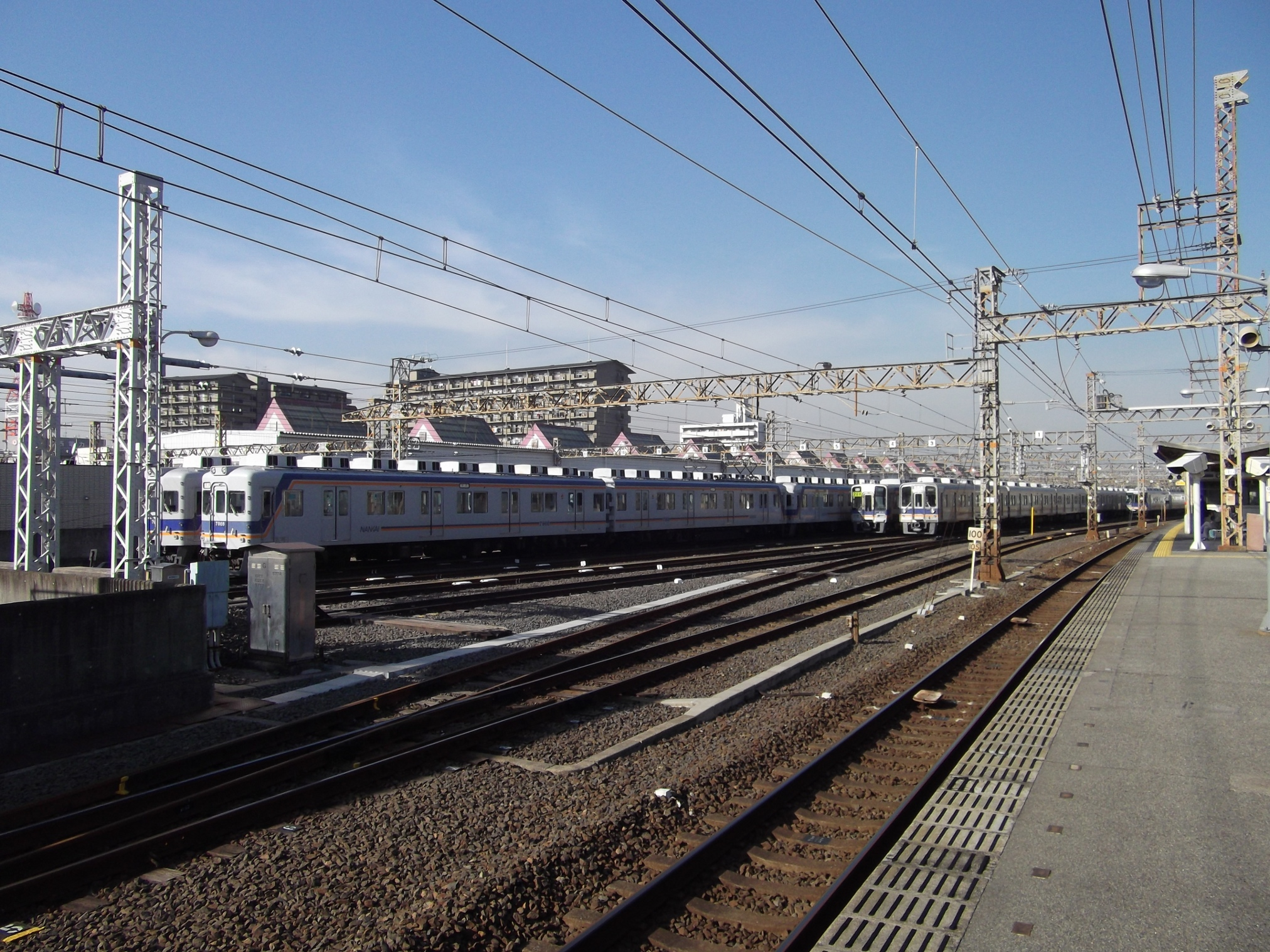
Inspection Depot

== Surrounding area ==
The district on the east side of the station is named "Anryu" (安立), and Anryumachi Station (HN14) on the Hankai Tramway Hankai Line is 300 m (980 ft) in the east from Suminoe Station. The district in the west of the station is "Suminoe" (住之江) and "Nishisuminoe" (西住之江).

=== Osaka City Bus ===
Buses are operated by Osaka Municipal Transportation Bureau.

Suminoe-ekisuji (on Route 26, 200 m (660 ft) west from Suminoe Station)
- Route 3 for Deto Bus Terminal via Harimacho / for Subway Suminoekoen
- Route 25 (no operation on Sundays and holidays) for Sumiyoshi Shako-mae via Harimacho and Furitsu Sogo Iryo Center / for Subway Suminoekoen

== Adjacent stations ==
«	Service	»
Nankai Main Line (NK09)
Sumiyoshitaisha (NK08)	Local (普通車)	Shichidō (NK10)
Semi-Express (only running for Namba on weekday mornings): Does not stop at this station
Sub. Express: Does not stop at this station
Airport Express: Does not stop at this station
Express: Does not stop at this station
Limited Express "Rapi:t", "Southern": Does not stop at this station

== See also ==
- List of railway stations in Japan
