= Hankai Line =

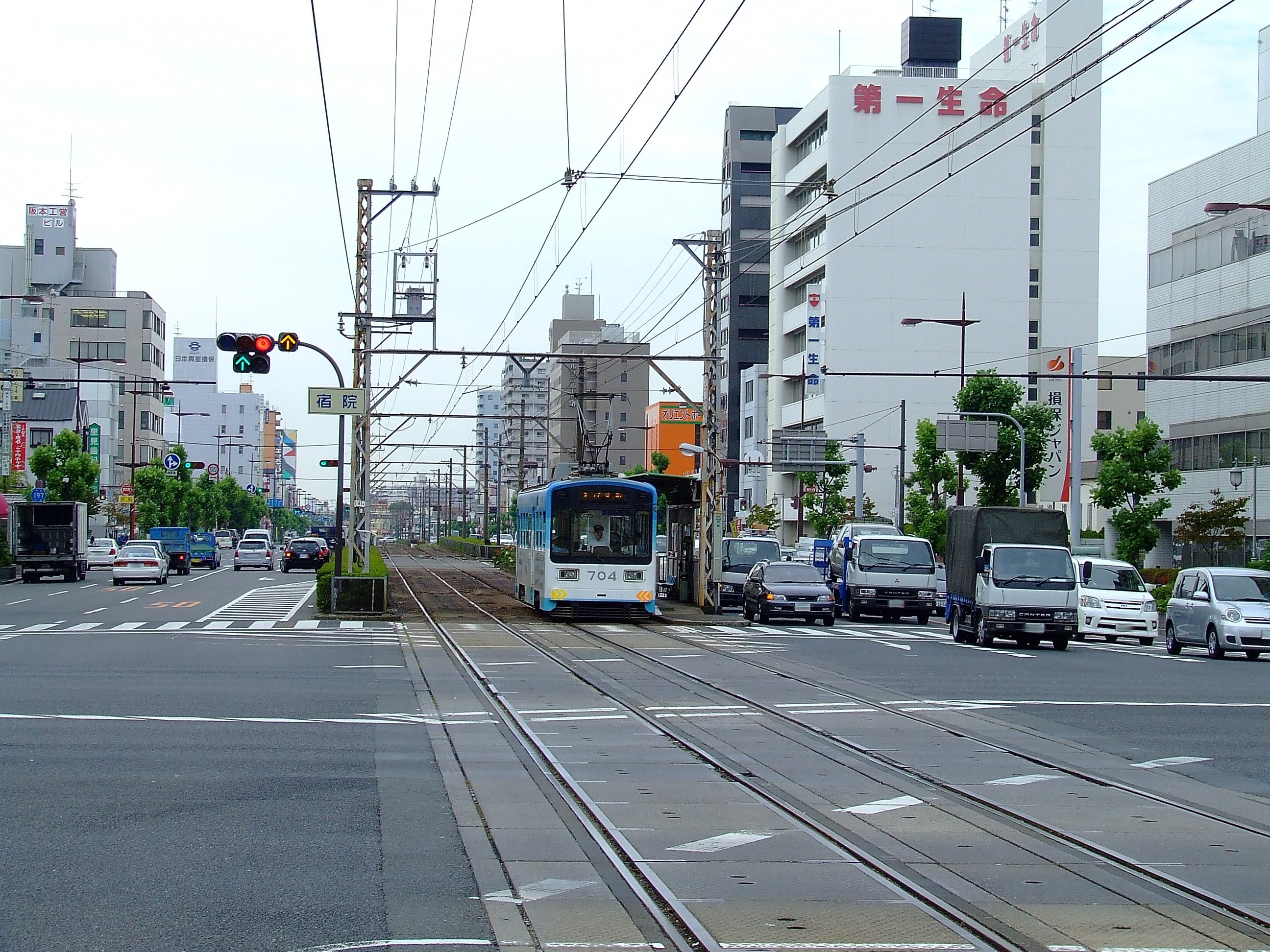
- Hankai Line near Shukuin Station in Sakai, October 2007

Overview
- Native name: 阪堺電車阪堺線
- Status: Open
- Owner: Hankai Tramway Co., Ltd.
- Termini: Ebisuchō; Hamadera eki-mae
- Stations: 31
- Website: www.hankai.co.jp

Service
- Type: Tram

The Hankai Line (阪堺電車阪堺線, Hankai Densha Hankai-sen) is a tramway in the cities of Osaka and Sakai, Osaka Prefecture, Japan. Hankai Tramway Co., Ltd. owns and operates the line.

The line's name comes from Osaka (大阪) (the kanji character for saka is also pronounced han) and Sakai (堺) (whose kanji contributed the kai).

== Services ==
While the Hankai Line is officially Ebisucho–Sumiyoshi–Abikomichi–Hamadera-Ekimae, all trams from Ebisucho operate only as far as Abikomichi, while Uemachi Line trams from Tennoji-ekimae operate through to Hamadera-ekimae.

== Stations ==
Station numbering was introduced in March 2012.

All trams from Ebisucho operate only as far as Abikomichi, with the section of line between Abikomichi and Hamadera eki-mae being serviced by Uemachi Line trams operating from Tennoji-ekimae.

No.	Station	Japanese	Distance (km)		Transfers	Location	
No.	Station	Japanese	Between stations	Total	Transfers	Location	
HN51	Ebisuchō	恵美須町	-	0.0	Osaka Metro: Sakaisuji Line (Ebisuchō: K18)	Osaka	Naniwa
HN52	Shin-Imamiya-Ekimae	新今宮駅前	0.6	0.6	JR West: Osaka Loop Line・Kansai Main Line (Yamatoji Line) (Shin-Imamiya); Nankai Electric Railway: Nankai Main Line ・Kōya Line (Shin-Imamiya); Osaka Metro: Sakaisuji Line (Dōbutsuen-mae, K19); Midosuji Line (Dōbutsuen-mae, M22)	Osaka	Nishinari
HN53	Imaike	今池	0.4	1.0	Nankai Electric Railway: Kōya Line (Haginochaya)	Osaka	Nishinari
HN54	Imafune	今船	0.3	1.3	Osaka Metro: Yotsubashi Line (Hanazonochō: K17)	Osaka	Nishinari
HN55	Matsudachō	松田町	0.4	1.7		Osaka	Nishinari
HN56	Kita-Tengachaya	北天下茶屋	0.3	2.0	Nankai Electric Railway: Nankai Main Line・Kōya Line (Tengachaya); Osaka Metro: Sakaisuji Line (Tengachaya: K20)	Osaka	Nishinari
HN57	Shōtensaka	聖天坂	0.4	2.4		Osaka	Nishinari
HN58	Tenjinnomori	天神ノ森	0.4	2.8	Nankai Electric Railway: Nankai Main Line ・Kōya Line (Kishinosato-Tamade)	Osaka	Nishinari
HN59	Higashi-Tamade	東玉出	0.4	3.2	Nankai Electric Railway: Nankai Main Line ・Kōya Line (Kishinosato-Tamade)	Osaka	Nishinari
HN60	Tsukanishi	塚西	0.4	3.6		Osaka	Nishinari
HN61	Higashi-Kohama	東粉浜	0.6	4.2	Nankai Electric Railway: Nankai Main Line (Kohama)	Osaka	Sumiyoshi
HN10	Sumiyoshi	住吉	0.4	4.6	Hankai Tramway: Uemachi Line	Osaka	Sumiyoshi
HN12	Sumiyoshi-toriimae	住吉鳥居前	0.2	4.8	Nankai Electric Railway: Nankai Main Line (Sumiyoshitaisha)	Osaka	Sumiyoshi
HN13	Hosoigawa	細井川	0.3	5.1		Osaka	Sumiyoshi
HN14	Anryumachi	安立町	0.5	5.6	Nankai Electric Railway: Nankai Main Line (Suminoe)	Osaka	Sumiyoshi
HN15	Abikomichi	我孫子道	0.6	6.2		Osaka	Sumiyoshi
HN16	Yamatogawa	大和川	0.6	6.8		Sakai	Sakai
HN17	Takasu-jinsha	高須神社	0.5	7.3		Sakai	Sakai
HN18	Ayanocho	綾ノ町	0.4	7.7		Sakai	Sakai
HN19	Shimmeicho	神明町	0.4	8.1		Sakai	Sakai
HN20	Myokokuji-mae	妙国寺前	0.3	8.4		Sakai	Sakai
HN21	Hanataguchi	花田口	0.3	8.7		Sakai	Sakai
HN22	Oshoji	大小路	0.3	9.0		Sakai	Sakai
HN23	Shukuin	宿院	0.4	9.4		Sakai	Sakai
HN24	Terajicho	寺地町	0.4	9.8		Sakai	Sakai
HN25	Goryomae	御陵前	0.4	10.2		Sakai	Sakai
HN26	Higashi-Minato	東湊	0.7	10.9		Sakai	Sakai
HN27	Ishizu-Kita	石津北	0.7	11.6		Sakai	Nishi
HN28	Ishizu	石津	0.6	12.2		Sakai	Nishi
HN29	Funao	船尾	0.7	12.9	Nankai Electric Railway: Nankai Main Line (Suwanomori)	Sakai	Nishi
HN31	Hamadera eki-mae	浜寺駅前	1.2	14.1	Nankai Electric Railway: Nankai Main Line (Hamaderakōen)	Sakai	Nishi

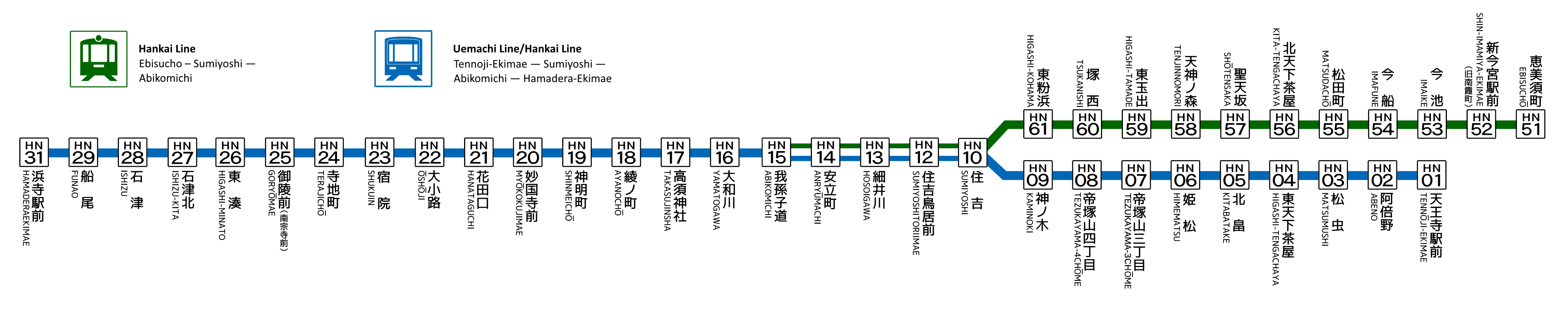
Hankai Tramway Route Map 2026

== History ==
The Hankai Line has its origin in the Hankai Tramway Co., Ltd., founded in 1910. In 1915 the company merged with the Nankai Railway which runs north and south in Osaka. The city's overall tram network was once extensive. As motorization developed as an alternative form of transportation along with the construction of subway lines underneath major routes, the trams lost their passengers, causing Osaka's once-extensive tram network to shrink, with only the Hankai and Uemachi tram lines remaining. By 1980, Hankai Tramway split from Nankai.

== See also ==
- Hankai Uemachi Line - the sister line of Hankai Line
