= Sumiyoshikoen Station =

Rail station

Sumiyoshikoen Station 住吉公園駅
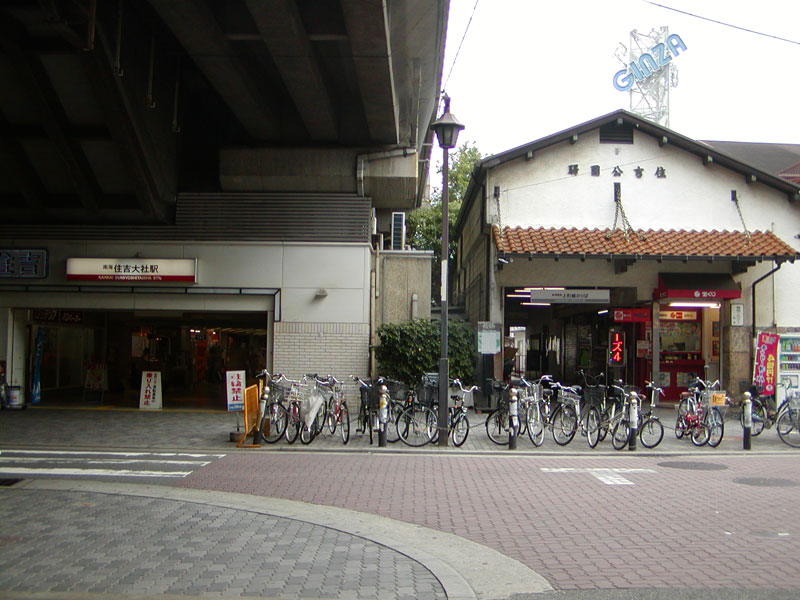
- Sumiyoshikōen Station (right) and entrance of Sumiyoshitaisha Station (left)

General information
- Location: Nagaochō, Sumiyoshi-ku, Osaka （大阪市住吉区長峡町） Osaka Prefecture; Japan
- Coordinates: 34°36′47.08″N 135°29′26.03″E
- System: Tram stop
- Operator: Hankai Tramway
- Line: ■ Uemachi Line
- Platforms: 2 side platforms

Other information
- Station code: HN11

History
- Opened: 1913
- Closed: 31 January 2016
Location

Sumiyoshikōen Station (住吉公園駅, Sumiyoshikōen-eki) was the former name of what is now Sumiyoshitaisha Station on the Nankai Main Line, and also the name of the adjoining tram station on the Hankai Tramway Uemachi Line.

The Nankai Main Line station still exists under the new name, while the tram station closed in 2016.

== Layout (Hankai Tram Line) ==
1, 2	■ Uemachi Line	for Abeno and Tennoji-ekimae

== History ==
Sumiyoshikōen Station opened in 1885 as part of the Hankai Railway (now Nankai Electric Railway) between Sakai and Namba. In 1913, the station added an additional street level tram platform, which was the terminus of the Uemachi Line.

The Uemachi Tram Line was later extended, and the Sumiyoshikōen section became a branch, with the main tram line located 70 meters to the east, and continuing through to Sakai. There were approximately 200 trams departing from the station in its peak in circa 1960. Eventually, the number of departures on the branch line was reduced to five (four in weekends) at the March 2014 timetable revision, serving 70 to 100 passengers per day.

In 1979, the station on the Nankai Main Line changed its name to Sumiyoshitaisha. The following year, ownership of the tram line was transferred to Hankai Tramway, and the tram terminus maintained the original Sumiyoshikōen Station name. The station, as well as the 200-meter branch line between Sumiyoshi and Sumiyoshikōen, was closed from 31 January 2016.

The Hankai Tramway Uemachi Line is still in service, with a street platform (Sumiyoshitoriimae) approximately 70 meters to the east of the former Sumiyoshikōen Station.
