= Abeno Shogaku High School =

School in Osaka, Japan

Coordinates: 34.6424°N 135.5253°E

Abeno Shogaku High School (あべの翔学高等学校, Abeno Shōgaku Kōtōgakkō) is a private coeducational senior high school in Abeno-ku, Osaka, Japan.

It was formerly Osaka Girls' Senior High School (大阪女子高等学校, Ōsaka Joshi Kōtōgakkō; OGSHS) but later became coeducational.
