= Osaka City University College of Nursing =

- 大阪市立大学看護短期大学部
- Type: Public
- Active: 1998–2007
- Location: Abeno-ku, Osaka, Japan
- Website: https://www.osaka-cu.ac.jp/en/academics/faculty/nursing

Osaka City University College of Nursing (大阪市立大学看護短期大学部, Osaka Shiritsu Daigaku Kango Tanki Daigakubu) was a public junior college in Abeno-ku, Osaka, Japan.

== History ==
- 1949 The predecessor of the school was founded.
- 1998 Junior College was set up at Abeno-ku, Osaka.
- 2003 The last student was registered.
- 2007 Closed.

== Academic departments ==
- Nursing

== See also ==
- Osaka City University
