= Ohtani Junior and Senior High School (Osaka) =

- 大谷中学校・高等学校
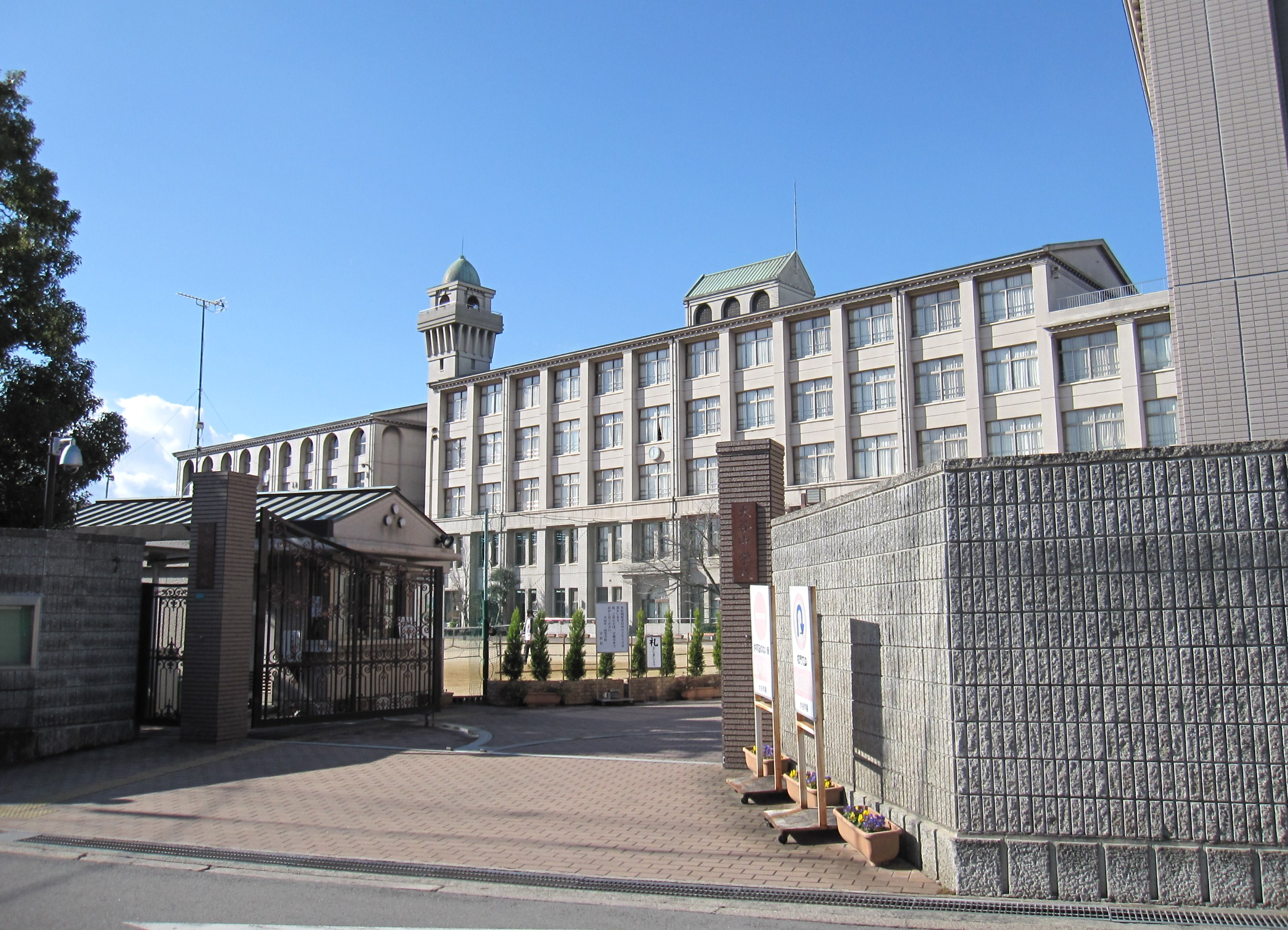
- Main Gate

Location
- Abeno-ku, Osaka; Japan
- Coordinates: 34.6389°N 135.5056°E

Information
- Former name: Ohtani Girls High School
- Type: Private
- Motto: 朝に礼拝 夕に感謝
- Religious affiliations: Ōtani-ha, Buddhism
- Established: 1909
- Gender: Girls
- Website: www.osk-ohtani.ed.jp

Ohtani Junior and Senior High School (大谷中学校・高等学校, Ōtani Chūgakkō Kōtōgakkō) is a private Buddhist girls' secondary school in Abeno-ku, Osaka.

In 1909 the school was first established. As of 2019 it had 1,406 students. It is a member of the Alliance of Girls' Schools Australasia.
