= Shichidō Station =

Railway station in Sakai, Japan

Shichidō Station 七道駅
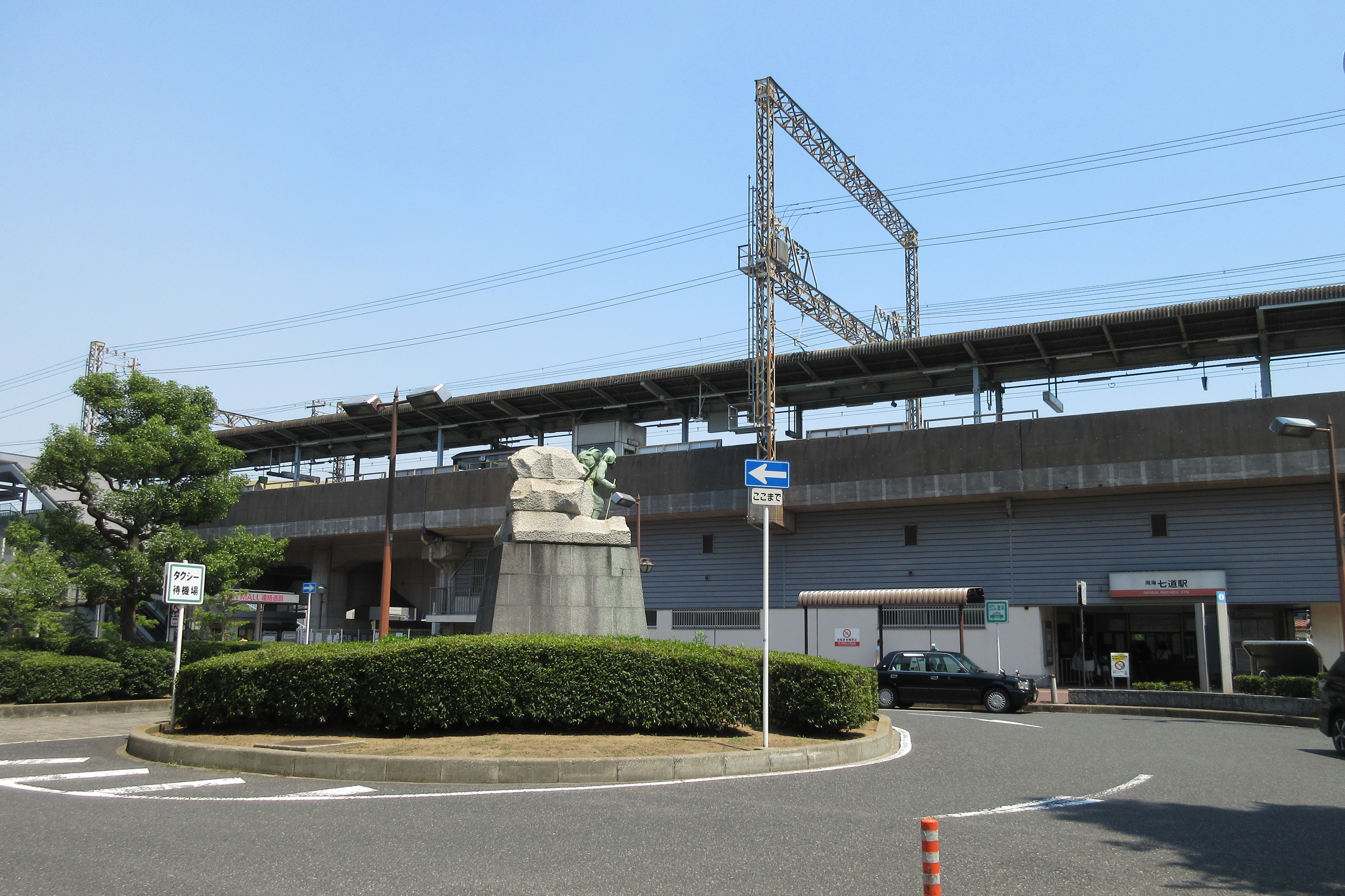
- Shichidō Station Entrance in July 2018

General information
- Location: 1-22, Teppōchō, Sakai-ku, Sakai-shi, Osaka-fu 590-0906; Japan
- Coordinates: 34°35′32″N 135°28′50″E
- Operator: Nankai Electric Railway
- Line: Nankai Main Line
- Distance: 8.2 km from Namba
- Platforms: 1 island platform

Other information
- Station code: NK10
- Website: Official website

History
- Opened: 21 April 1917; 109 years ago

Passengers
- 2019: 11,402 daily

Services
Preceding station	Nankai Electric Railway	Following station
Suminoe towards Namba	Nankai Main Line Local	Sakai towards Wakayamashi
Location
- Location within Osaka Prefecture Location within Japan

Shichidō Station (七道駅, Shichidō-eki) is a passenger railway station located in Sakai-ku, Sakai, Osaka Prefecture, Japan, operated by the private railway operator Nankai Electric Railway. It has the station number "NK10".

== Lines ==
Shichidō Station is served by the Nankai Main Line, and is 8.2 kilometers (5.1 mi) from the terminus of the line at Nanba.

== Layout ==
The station consists of one elevated island platform with the station building underneath.

=== Platforms ===
1	■ Nankai Main Line	for Wakayamashi and Kansai Airport
2	■ Nankai Main Line	for Namba

== History ==
Shichidō Station opened on 21 April 1917.

== Passenger statistics ==
In fiscal 2019, the station was used by an average of 11,402 passengers daily.

== Surrounding area ==
- AEON MALL Sakai Teppocho.
- Shutaku-ji Temple
- Somi-ji Temple
- Kawaguchi Ekai Birthplace site

== See also ==
- List of railway stations in Japan
