= Suwanomori Station =

Railway station in Sakai, Japan

Suwanomori Station 諏訪ノ森駅
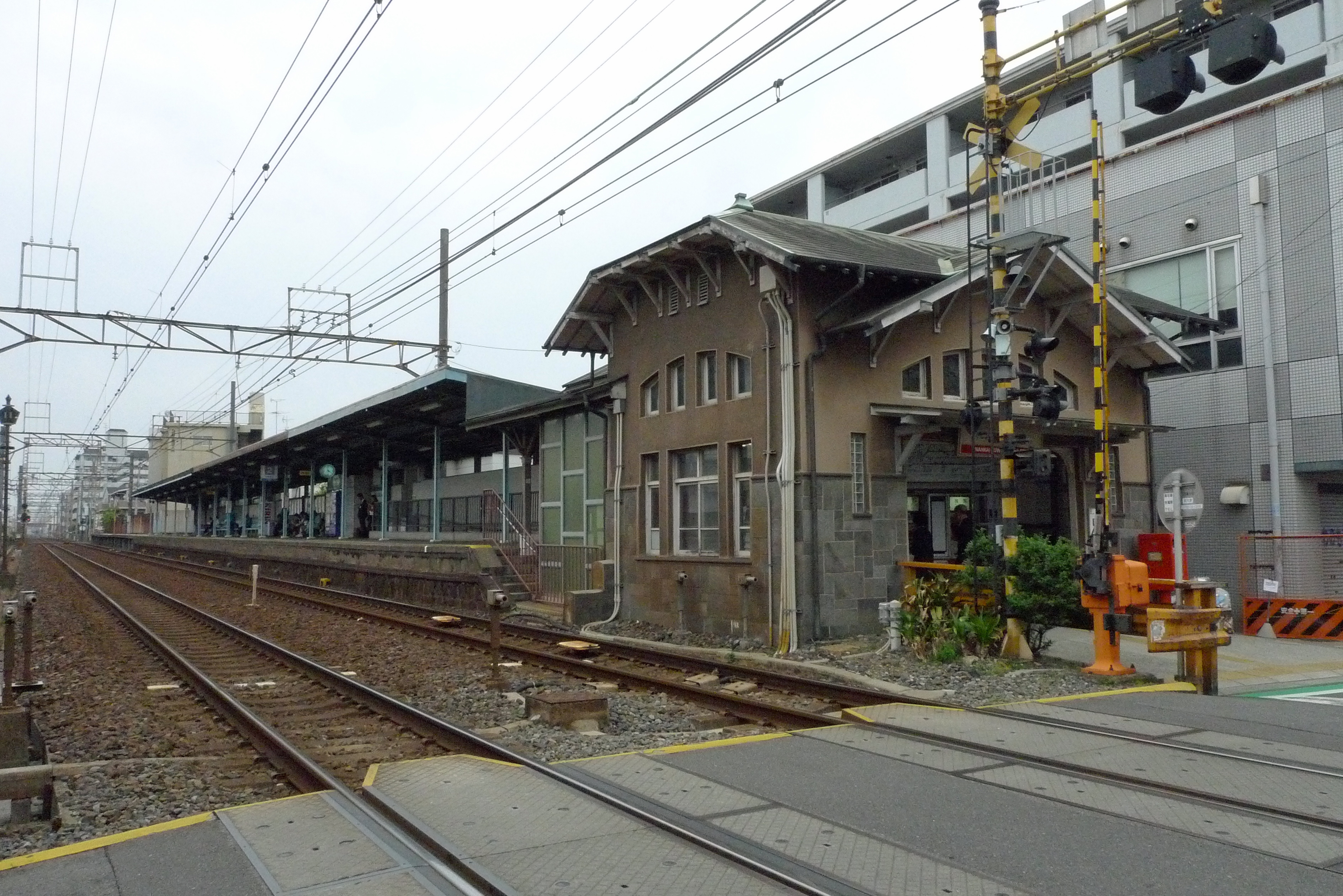
- Suwanomori Station in April 2012

General information
- Location: 78, Hamadera Suwanomori-cho Nishi 2-cho, Nishi-ku, Sakai-shi, Osaka-fu 592-8347; Japan
- Coordinates: 34°33′07″N 135°26′57″E
- Operator: Nankai Electric Railway
- Line: Nankai Main Line
- Distance: 13.8 km from Namba
- Platforms: 2 side platforms

Other information
- Station code: NK14
- Website: Official website

History
- Opened: 20 December 1907; 118 years ago
- Former names: Kitahamadera (to 1908)

Passengers
- 2019: 7749 daily
Location
- Location within Osaka Prefecture Location within Japan

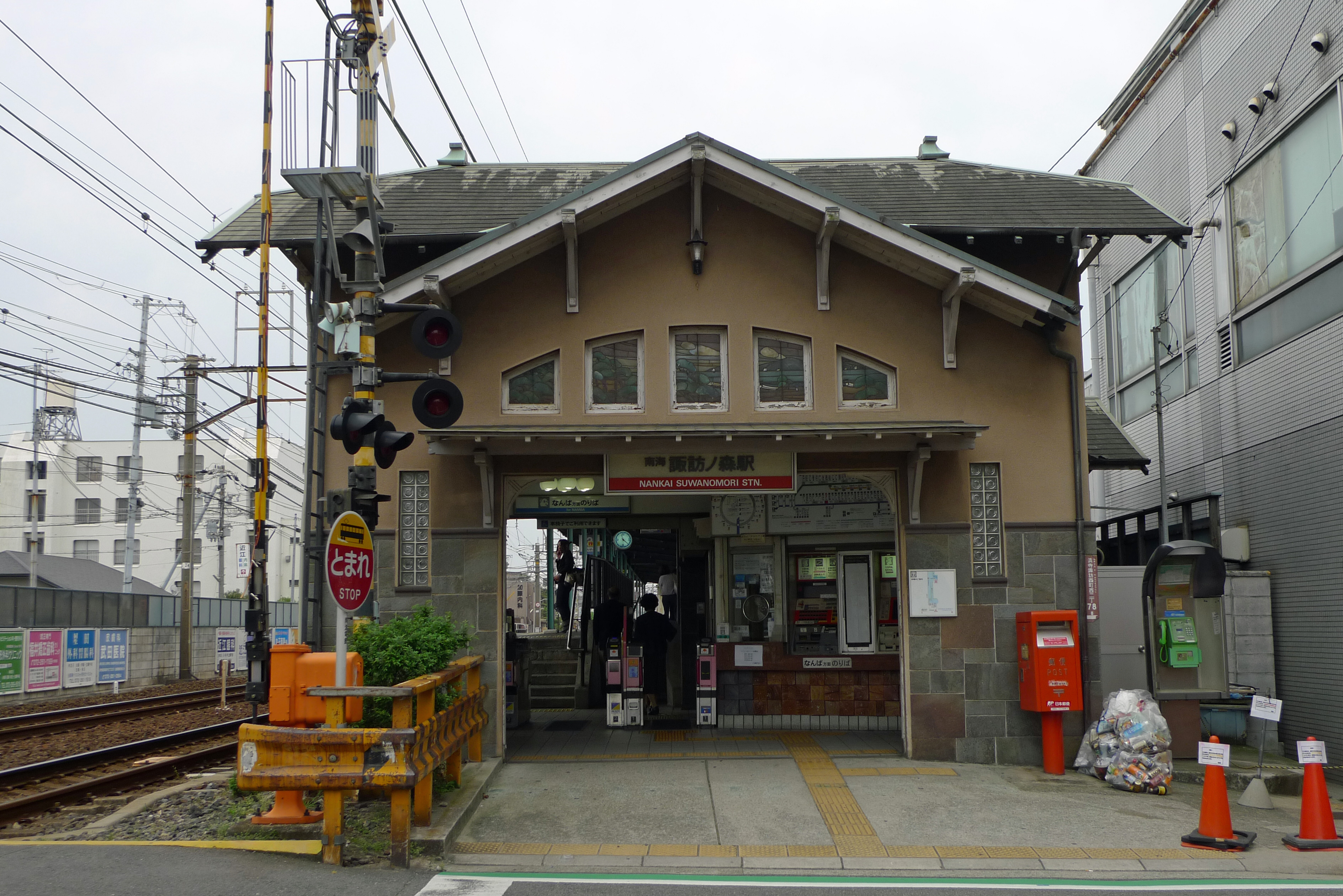
station building

Suwanomori Station (諏訪ノ森駅, Suwanomori-eki) is a passenger railway station located in Nishi-ku, Sakai, Osaka Prefecture, Japan, operated by the private railway operator Nankai Electric Railway. It has the station number "NK14".

== Lines ==
Suwanomori Station is served by the Nankai Main Line, and is 13.8 kilometers (8.6 mi) from the terminus of the line at Nanba.

== Layout ==
The station consists of two opposed side platforms. The platforms are not interconnected, and passengers wishing to change platforms must exit the station, cross via a level crossing, and re-enter the station.

=== Platforms ===
1	■ Nankai Main Line	for Wakayamashi and Kansai Airport
2	■ Nankai Main Line	for Namba

== Adjacent stations ==
«	Service	»
Nankai Main Line
Limited Express "rapi:t α" for Kansai Airport (特急ラピートα): Does not stop at this station
Limited Express "rapi:t β" (特急ラピートβ): Does not stop at this station
Limited Express "Southern" (特急サザン): Does not stop at this station
Limited Express without seat reservations (自由席特急): Does not stop at this station
Express (急行): Does not stop at this station
Airport Express (空港急行): Does not stop at this station
Sub. Express (区間急行): Does not stop at this station
Ishizugawa	Semi-Express for Namba (準急, in the morning on weekdays)	Hamaderakōen
Ishizugawa	Local (普通車)	Hamaderakōen

== History ==
Suwanomori Station opened on 20 December 1907 as Kitahamadera Station (北浜寺). It was renamed it its present name on 1 December 1908.

== Passenger statistics ==
In fiscal 2019, the station was used by an average of 7749 passengers daily.

== Surrounding area ==
- Suwa no Morimoto Shopping Street.
- Suwa Shrine
- Sakai City Hamadera Elementary School
- Sakai City Hamaderahigashi Elementary School
- Senshu School of Nursing

== See also ==
- List of railway stations in Japan
