= Abeno Station =

Metro station in Osaka, Japan

Abeno Station 阿倍野駅
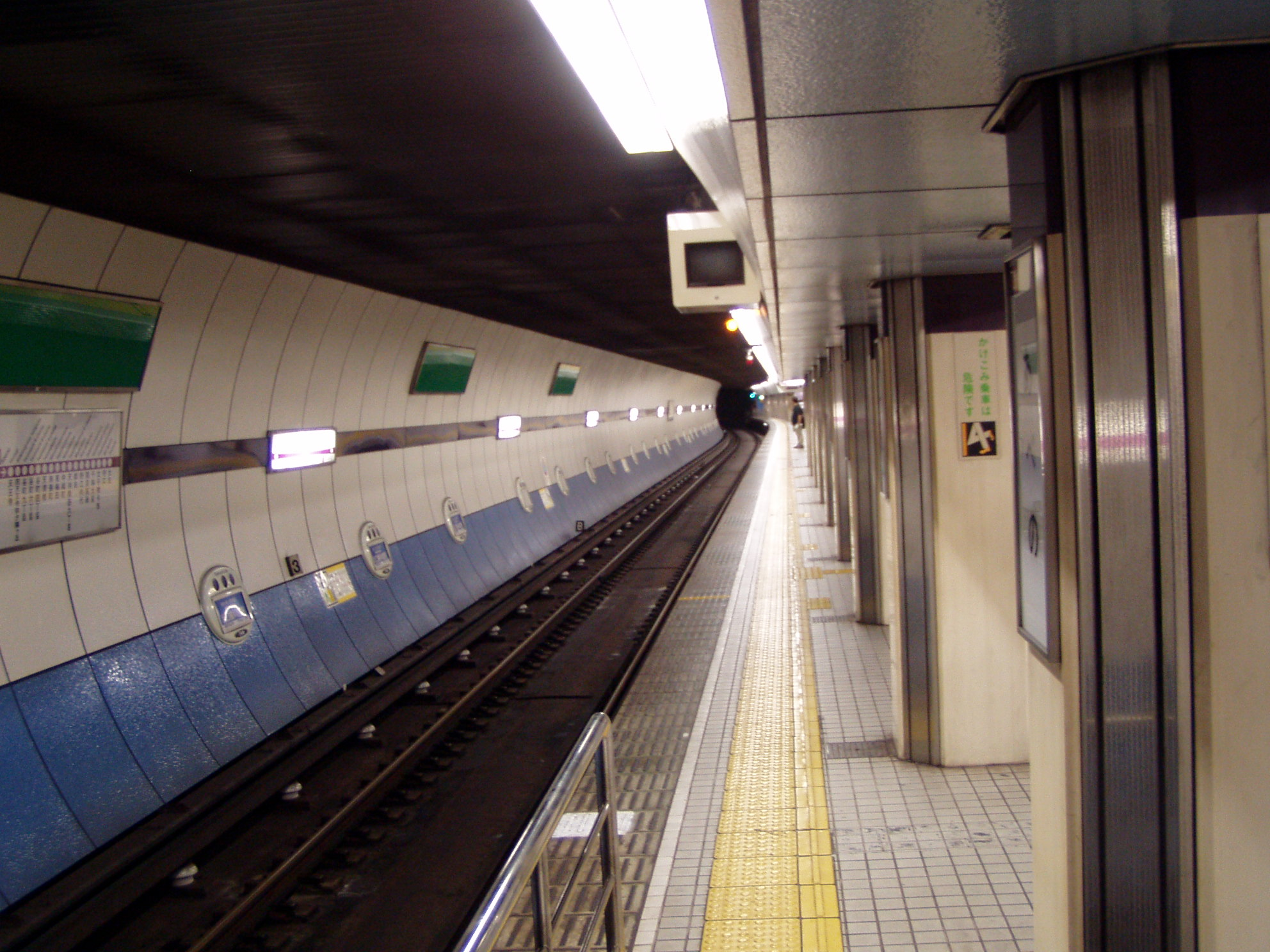
- Subway station platform

General information
- Location: Abeno-ku, Osaka; Japan
- Coordinates: 34°38′34.76″N 135°30′43.9″E
- System: Osaka Metro/Hankai Tramway station
- Operator: Osaka Metro; Hankai Tramway
- Lines: Tanimachi Line; Hankai Uemachi Line
- Platforms: 1 island platform (Tanimachi Line); 2 side platforms (Umeachi Line)
- Tracks: 4 (2 for each line)

Construction
- Structure type: Underground

Other information
- Station code: T 28; HN02 (Hankai Uemachi Line)

History
- Opened: 1910 (Hankai Tramway); 1980 (Osaka Metro)

Services
Preceding station	Osaka Metro	Following station
Tennōji T 27 towards Dainichi	Tanimachi Line	Fuminosato T 29 towards Yaominami
Location
- Location within Osaka Prefecture Location within Japan

Abeno Station (阿倍野駅, Abeno-eki) is a metro station on the Tanimachi Line of the Osaka Metro and a tram stop on the Hankai Uemachi Line in Abeno-ku, Osaka, Japan.

== Station layout ==
Osaka Metro Tanimachi Line (T28)

- an island platform serving two tracks under Abeno-suji.

1	■ Tanimachi Line	for Fuminosato and Yaominami
2	■ Tanimachi Line	for Tennoji, Higashi-Umeda and Dainichi

Hankai Uemachi Line (HN02)

- two side platforms serving a track each on Abeno-suji.

1	■ Uemachi Line	Tennoji-ekimae
2	■ Uemachi Line	for Sumiyoshi and Sumiyoshikoen for Sumiyoshi, Abikomichi and Hamadera-ekimae

== Surroundings ==
=== Public ===
- Osaka City Abeno Life Safety Learning Center
- Abeno Kumin Center
  - Osaka Municipal Abeno Library
- Kansai Electric Power Company, Inc. Abeno Substation

=== Market ===
- Abeno BELTA
  - Kansai Super
- abeno CUES TOWN
- Abeno Marche
- Kintetsu Department Store

=== Others ===
- Tsuji Group (cooking school)
- Magata Shōten (Tonkatsu KYK, Curry San Marco)
- Tobita Shinchi

== Stations next to Abeno ==
«	Service	»
Hankai Tramway Uemachi Line (HN02)
Tennoji-ekimae (HN01)	-	Matsumushi (HN03)
Nankai Railway Hirano Line (abandoned)
Tobita; Tennoji-ekimae (Uemachi Line)	-	Nawashiroda
