= Abeno Plain =

Coordinates: 34.644°N 135.508°E

Abeno (阿倍野 or 阿部野) is an ancient name of a plain in the Settsu Province of Japan, presently in Osaka Prefecture, south of Yodo River and west of Uemachi Plateau (上町台地, Uemachi daichi). It was the scene of several battles during the Sengoku period.
