= Osaka Municipal College of Design =

Public art school in Osaka, Japan

Coordinates: 34°38′16″N 135°31′07″E

Osaka Municipal College of Design (大阪市立デザイン教育研究所, Ōsaka Shiritsu Dezain Kyōiku Kenkyūsho) is a public art college run by the city of Osaka. It is called OMCD for short. OMCD was founded in 1988 as an institution of continuous vocational education and is a sister institution to the Osaka City Kogei High School.
