= Sumiyoshi (name) =

Sumiyoshi (written: 住吉) is a Japanese surname. Notable people with the surname include:

Surname:

- Jelani Reshaun Sumiyoshi, Japanese-Americans footballer
- Miki Sumiyoshi (住吉 美紀, born 1973), Japanese television personality
- Miyako Sumiyoshi (住吉 都, 1987–2018), Japanese speed skater
- Tadashi Sumiyoshi (住吉 正, 1893–1976), Japanese general
- Yukiko Sumiyoshi (住吉 文子, born 1982), Japanese manga artist

Sumiyoshi (written: 純義) is also a masculine Japanese given name. Notable people with the name include:

- Kawamura Sumiyoshi (川村 純義, 1836–1904), Imperial Japanese Navy admiral
