= Kohama Station =

Railway station in Osaka, Japan

Kohama Station 粉浜駅
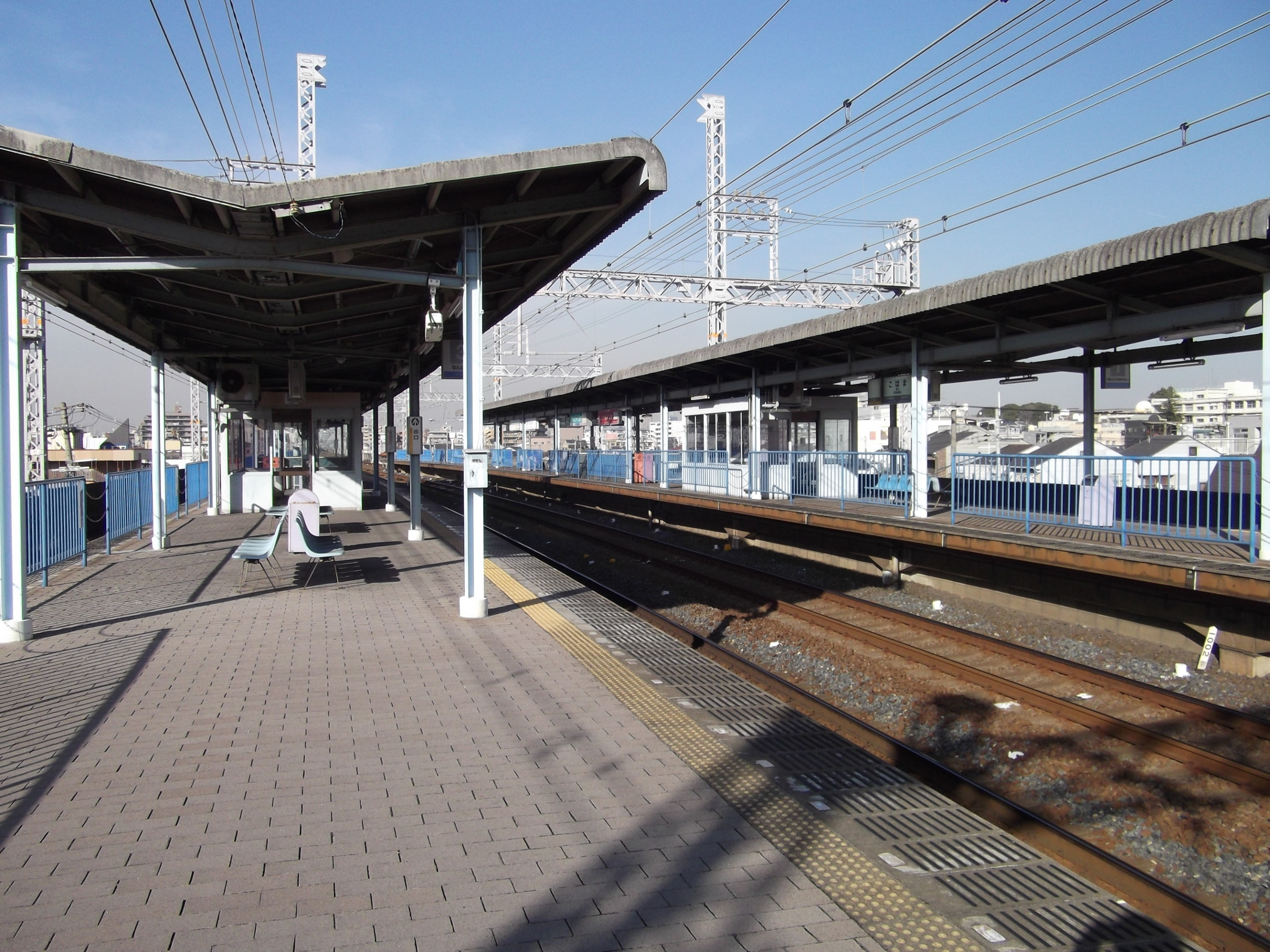
- Kohama Station platforms in February 2011

General information
- Location: 3-23-25, Higashi-Kohama, Sumiyoshi, Osaka （大阪市住吉区東粉浜3丁目23番25号） Osaka Prefecture; Japan
- Coordinates: 34°37′5.55″N 135°29′30.67″E
- Operator: Nankai Electric Railway
- Line: Nankai Main Line
- Platforms: 2 island platforms

Construction
- Structure type: Elevated

Other information
- Station code: NK07
- Website: Official website

History
- Opened: April 1917; 109 years ago
- Rebuilt: August 1979; 47 years ago

Passengers
- 4,695 daily
Location
- Location within Japan

Kohama Station (粉浜駅, Kohama-eki) is a railway station in Sumiyoshi-ku, Osaka, Osaka Prefecture, Japan, operated by the private railway operator Nankai Electric Railway.

== Lines ==
Kohama Station is served by the Nankai Main Line, and has the station number "NK07".

== Layout ==
The station has two island platforms serving two tracks each. Tracks 2 and 4 are fenced and are not in use.

=== Tracks ===
1	■ Nankai Line	for Wakayamashi and (■ Airport Line) Kansai Airport
2	■ Nankai Line	not in use

3	■ Nankai Line	for Namba
4	■ Nankai Line	not in use

== Adjacent stations ==
«	Service	»
Nankai Main Line
Limited Express (including "rapi:t" and "Southern"): Does not stop at this station
Express: Does not stop at this station
Airport Express: Does not stop at this station
Sub. Express: Does not stop at this station
Semi-Express for Namba (only in the morning on weekdays): Does not stop at this station
Kishinosato-Tamade	Local (普通車)	Sumiyoshitaisha

== See also ==
- List of railway stations in Japan
