= Sumiyoshi Station (Osaka) =

Tram station in Osaka, Japan

Sumiyoshi Station 住吉駅
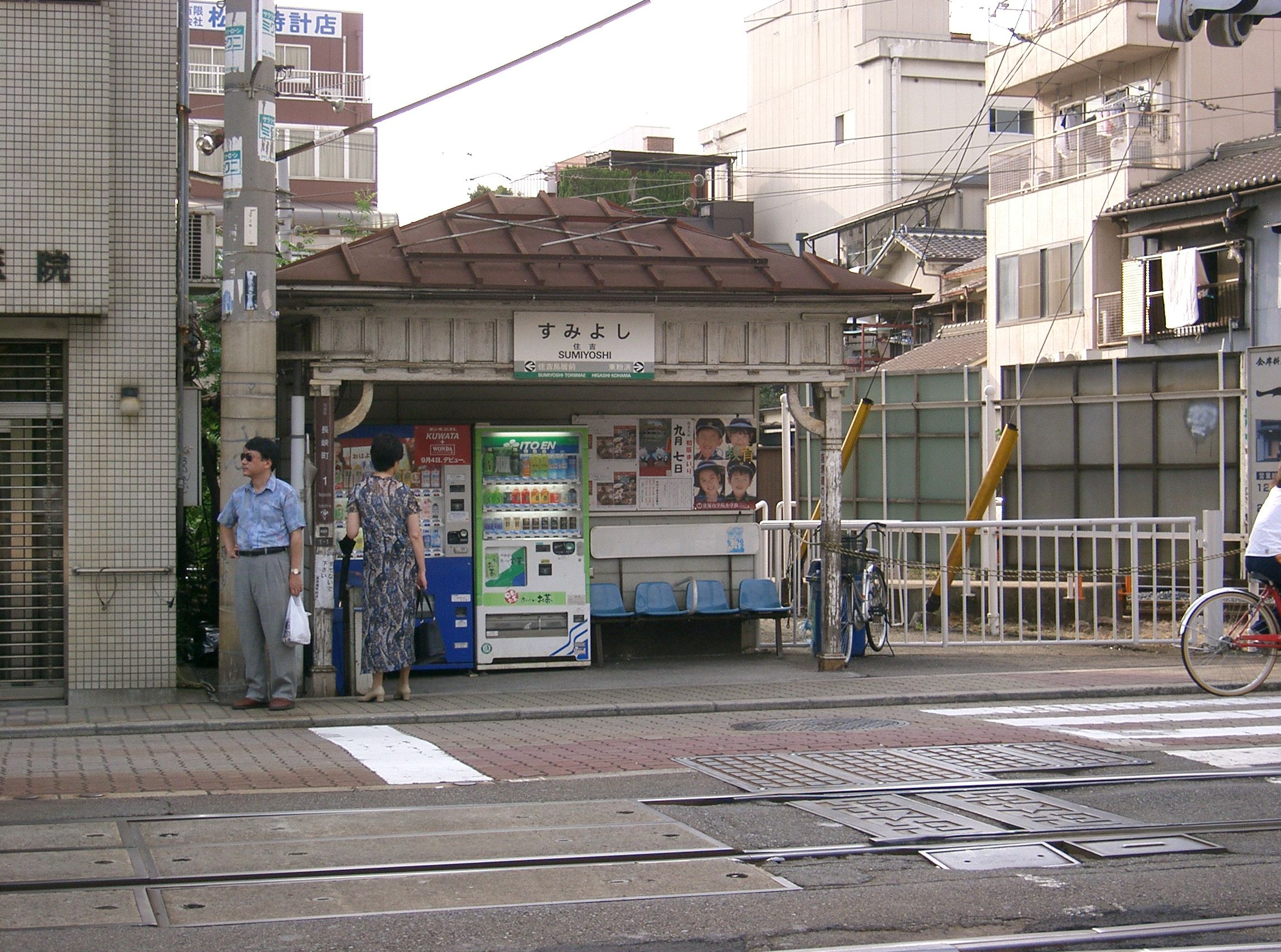

General information
- Location: Sumiyoshi Nichome, Sumiyoshi, Osaka, Osaka （大阪市住吉区住吉二丁目） Japan
- Coordinates: 34°36′51.9″N 135°29′30.7″E
- Operator: Hankai Tramway
- Lines: Uemachi Line, Hankai Line

Other information
- Station code: HN10

History
- Opened: 1910
Location

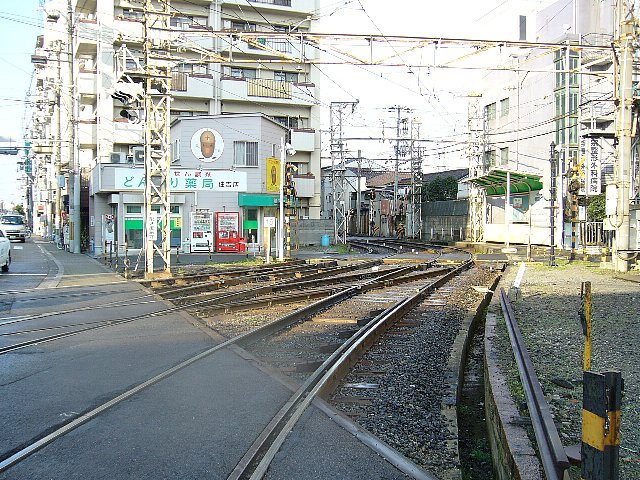

Sumiyoshi Station (住吉駅, Sumiyoshi eki) is a tramway stop in Sumiyoshi-ku, Osaka, Japan, operated by Hankai Tramway Co., Ltd.

== Lines ==
Hankai Tramway (HN10)
- Hankai Line
- Uemachi Line

== Structure ==
- A side platform is located each side of Sumiyoshi Junction.

1	■ Hankai Line	from Ebisucho for Abikomichi
2	■ Hankai Line	from Abikomichi for Ebisucho
2	■ Uemachi Line	from Abikomichi for Tennoji-ekimae
3	■ Hankai Line	from Tennoji-ekimae for Abikomichi and Hamadera-ekimae
4	■ Closed	

1. North side of Sumiyoshi Junction
2. South side of Sumiyoshi Junction
3. East side of Sumiyoshi Junction
4. West side of Sumiyoshi Junction

== Adjacent stations ==
«	Service	»
Hankai Line
Higashi-Kohama (HN61); Kaminoki (HN09, Uemachi Line)	-	Sumiyoshi-Toriimae (HN12)
Uemachi Line
Kaminoki (HN09)	-	Sumiyoshi-Toriimae (HN12, Hankai Line)
Uemachi Line abandoned route
Terminus	-	Sumiyoshikoen (HN11)
