= Hankai Uemachi Line =

Uemachi Line
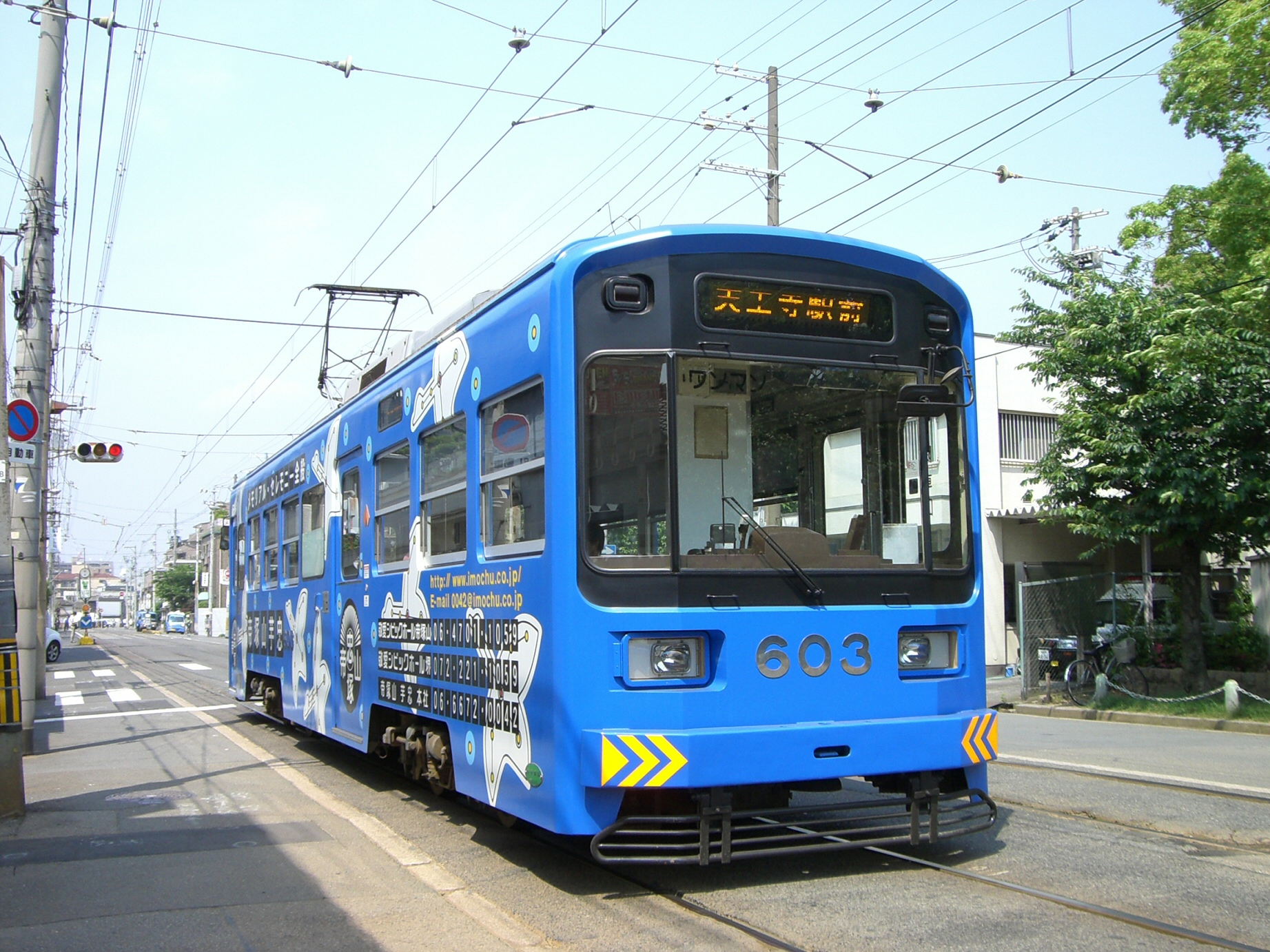
- Uemachi Line tram

Overview
- Locale: Osaka
- Termini: Tennoji-ekimae; Sumiyoshi
- Stations: 10

Service
- Type: Tram
- Operator(s): Hankai Tramway, Co., Ltd.
- Depot: Abikomichi

History
- Opened: September 20, 1900

Technical
- Line length: 4.4 km (2.7 mi)
- Track length: 4.4 km (2.7 mi)
- Number of tracks: 2
- Track gauge: 1,435 mm (4 ft 8 1/2 in) standard gauge (1910–)
- Old gauge: 1,067 mm (3 ft 6 in) (–1908)
- Electrification: 600 V, DC, overhead lines
- Operating speed: 30 km/h (19 mph) (Kitabatake–Tezukayama Yonchome); 40 km/h (25 mph) (other)

The Uemachi Line (上町線, Uemachi-sen) is a tramway line of Hankai Tramway Co., Ltd. in Osaka, Japan. The line has 10 stations between Tennoji-ekimae (HN01) and Sumiyoshi (HN10).

== Services ==
All trams continue past Sumiyoshi (HN10) onto the Hankai Line to terminate at either Abikomichi (HN15) or Hamadera-ekimae (HN31).

== Stations ==
Station numbers are in parentheses.

Current section
Tennoji-ekimae (HN01) - ~~Tokiwadōri~~ - Abeno (HN02) - ~~Nakamichi~~ - Matsumushi (HN03) - Higashi-Tengachaya (HN04) - Kitabatake (HN05) - Himematsu (HN06) - Tezukayama-sanchōme (HN07) - Tezukayama-yonchōme (HN08) - Kaminoki (HN09) - Sumiyoshi (HN10)
Through section on the Hankai Line
Sumiyoshi (HN10) - Sumiyoshi-toriimae (HN12) - Hosoigawa (HN13) - Anryumachi (HN14) - Abikomichi (HN15) - Yamatogawa (HN16) - Takasu-jinsha (HN17) - Ayanocho (HN18) - Shimmeicho (HN19) - Myokokuji-mae (HN20) - Hanataguchi (HN21) - Oshoji (HN22) - Shukuin (HN23) - Terajicho (HN24) - Goryomae (HN25) - Higashi-Minato (HN26) - Ishizu-Kita (HN27) - Ishizu (HN28) - Funao (HN29) - Hamadera-ekimae (HN31)
Dealt section to Osaka City (later abandoned)
Tennōji (near Shitennō-ji) - Chausuyama - Kōen-higashimon
Abandoned section
Kōen-higashimon - Tennoji-eki-mae
Sumiyoshi (HN10) - Sumiyoshikōen (HN11)

=== Connections ===
Tennoji-ekimae	Tennoji Station: West Japan Railway Company (JR-West) Yamatoji Line, JR-West Hanwa Line, JR-West Osaka Loop Line, Osaka Municipal Subway Midosuji Line, Osaka Municipal Subway Tanimachi Line; Osaka Abenobashi Station: Kintetsu Minami Osaka Line
Abeno	Osaka Municipal Subway Tanimachi Line
Tezukayama-sanchome	Tezukayama Station: Nankai Railway Koya Line
Kaminoki	Sumiyoshihigashi Station: Nankai Railway Koya Line
Sumiyoshi	Hankai Line

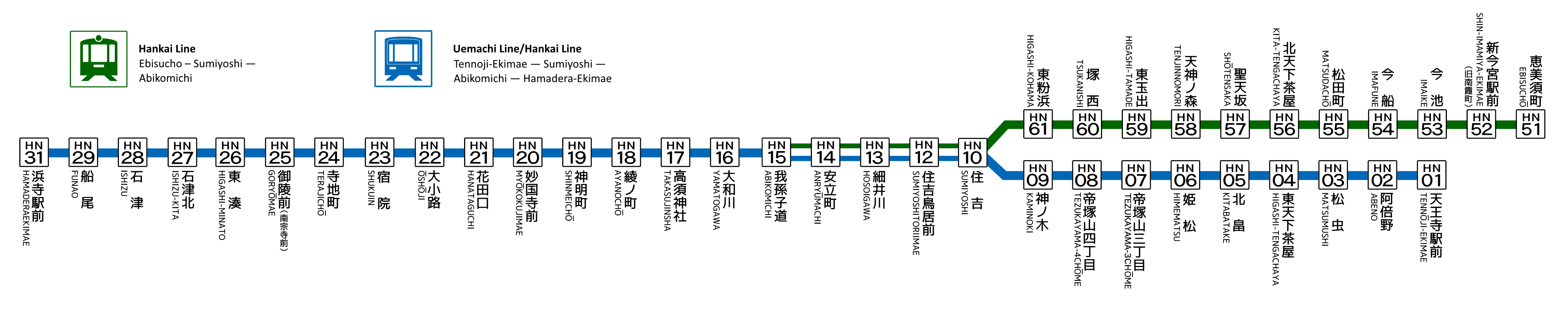
Hankai Tramway Route Map 2026

== History ==
- September 20, 1900 – Osaka Horse Rail Co. (大阪馬車鉄道, Osaka Basha Tetsudo) from Tennoji-nishimon-mae to Higashi-Tengachaya was opened, with 1,067 mm (3 ft 6 in) gauge rails.
- November 29, 1900 – The line was extended from Higashi-Tengachaya to Kamisumiyoshi (Present: Kaminoki).
- December 27, 1902 – The line was extended from Kamisumiyoshi to Shimosumiyoshi (Later: Sumiyoshijinja-mae, Present: Sumiyoshi).
- 1907 – Renamed "Osaka Densha Rail Co." (大阪電車鉄道), then "Naniwa Densha Tram Co." (浪速電車軌道).
- February 1, 1908 – The line was abandoned for the gauge conversion to standard gauge and electrification.
- December 24, 1909 – Nankai Railway consolidated Naniwa Densha Tram, then became the Uemachi Line.
- October 1, 1910 – The Uemachi Line was reopened after the completion of the gauge conversion and electrification. Tram operations were restarted between Tennoji-nishimon-mae and Sumiyoshijinja-mae.
- January 19, 1911 – Through operation to Osaka Municipal Tram started.
- January 12, 1912 – Through operation to Osaka Municipal Tram ended.
- July 12, 1913 – The Uemachi Line is extended from Sumiyoshijinja-mae to Sumiyoshikoen.
- December 24, 1921 – The Uemachi Line from Tennoji-nishimon to Tennoji-ekimae became the line of Osaka Municipal Tram.
- June 1, 1944 – Kansai Kyuko Railway Co. and Nankai Railway Co. were consolidated and became Kinki Nippon Railway Co., Ltd. (present: Kintetsu Railway).
- June 1, 1947 – Kinki Nippon divided rails of the former Nankai Lines to Nankai Electric Railway Co., Ltd., and the Uemachi Line became one of the lines of the Osaka Tram Line, as well as the Hankai Line and the Hirano Line.
- 1980 – After the final operation of the Hirano Line on November 27, the Uemachi Line and the Hankai Line were transferred to Hankai Tramway Co., Ltd. on December 1.
- July 4, 2009 – Through operation between Tennoji-ekimae and Hamadera-ekimae restarted.
- February 2, 2013 – Tennoji-ekimae Station became the only station from which trams go to Hamadera-ekimae.
- January 31, 2016 – The Uemachi Line is closed from Sumiyoshi to Sumiyoshikoen.
