= Nishi-ku, Sakai =

Ward of the City of Sakai, Japan

Coordinates: 34°32′5.99″N 135°27′50.31″E

Map

Nishi-ku in the city

Nishi-ku (西区) is a ward of the city of Sakai in Osaka Prefecture, Japan. The ward has an area of 28.62 km^{2} (11.05 sq mi) and a population of 133,583. The population density is 4,667 per square kilometer. The name means "West Ward."

The wards of Sakai were established when Sakai became a city designated by government ordinance on April 1, 2006.
