= Hankai Tramway =

Japanese tramway operation company

Hankai Tramway Co., Ltd.

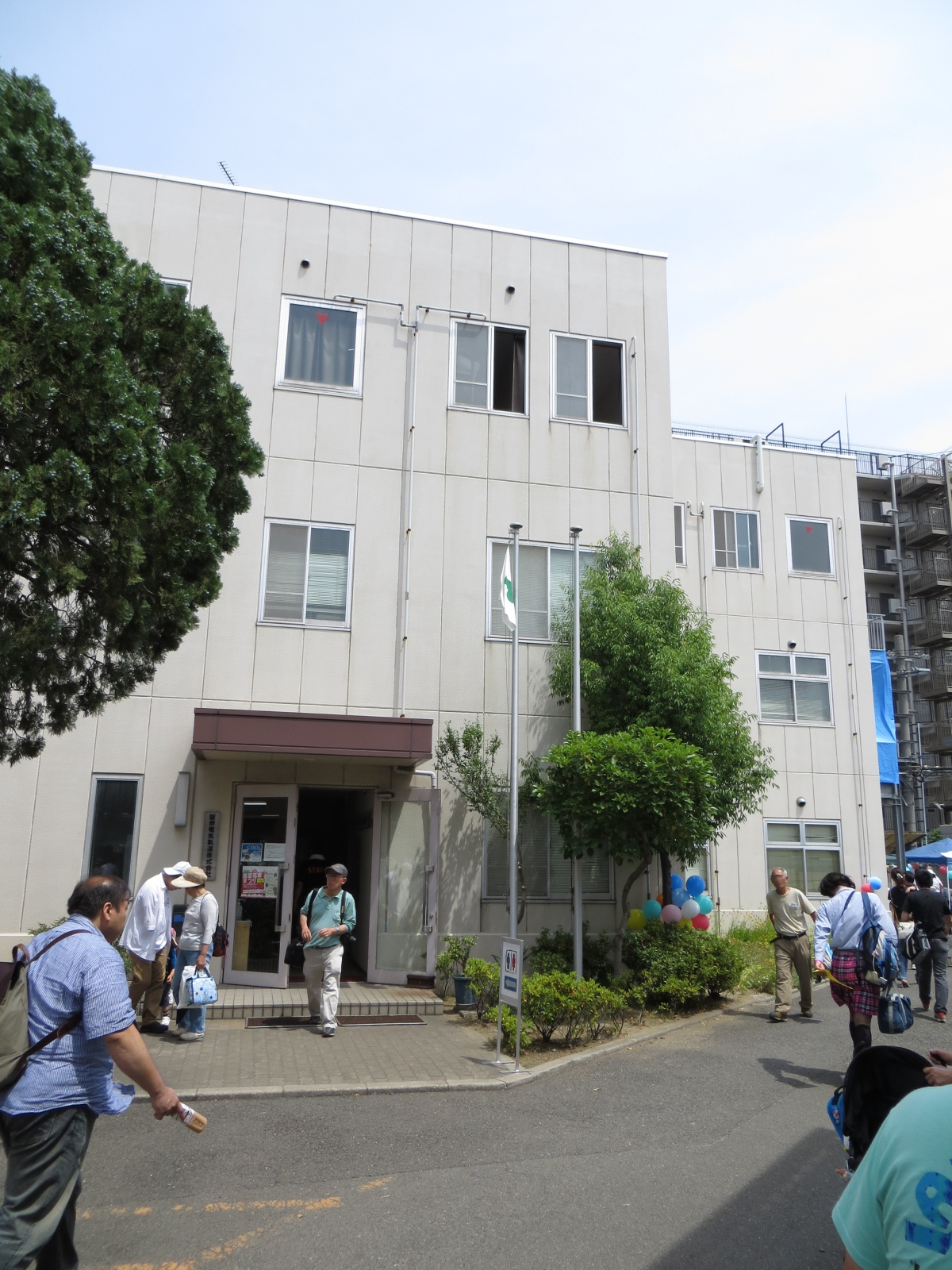
- Headquarters of Hankai Tramway
- Native name: 阪堺電気軌道株式会社
- Romanized name: Hankai Denki Kidō Kabushiki Gaisha
- Type: Public-private KK
- Industry: Transportation
- Founded: 7 July 1980
- Website: www.hankai.co.jp

Hankai Tramway Co., Ltd. (阪堺電気軌道株式会社, Hankai Denki Kidō Kabushiki-gaisha) is private railway company which operates two tram lines in Osaka Prefecture, Japan, in the cities of Osaka and Sakai. It is a wholly-owned subsidiary of Nankai Electric Railway.

== Lines ==
Hankai Tramway operates two officially designated lines:

Line	Route	Stops	Length
Hankai Line	Ebisucho — Sumiyoshi — Abikomichi — Hamadera-eki-mae	31	14.0 km (8.7 mi)
Uemachi Line	Tennoji-eki-mae — Sumiyoshi	10	4.3 km (2.7 mi)
Total:			18.3 km (11.4 mi)

The lines use standard gauge tracks and are electrified at 600 Volts via catenary.

== Services ==
As is often the case with Japanese tramway operators, the operated services differ from the official line definitions.

Two routes are in operation (no route number is displayed):

Route	Major stations	Stops	Length
Hankai Line	Ebisucho — Sumiyoshi — Abikomichi	16	6.1 km (3.8 mi)
Uemachi Line/Hankai Line	Tennoji-eki-mae — Sumiyoshi — Abikomichi — Hamadera-eki-mae	29	13.8 km (8.6 mi)

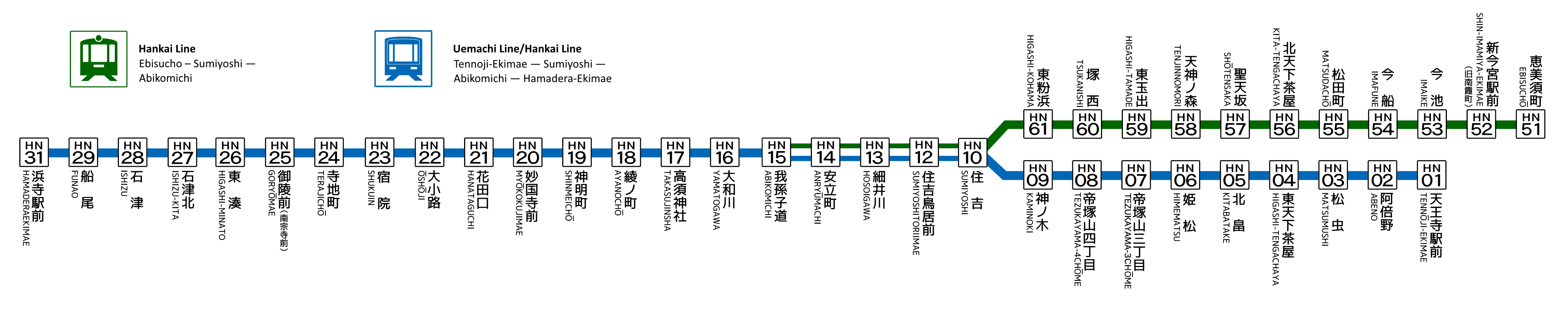
Hankai Tramway Route Map 2026

Sumiyoshi and Abikomichi act as designated transfer stations; alighting and re-boarding a second tram at these locations (without doubling back) will result in the second fare being free.

Services operate at the following approximate frequencies:

	Uemachi Line/Hankai Line		Hankai Line
Time Period	Tennoji-eki-mae ↔ Abikomichi	Tennoji-eki-mae ↔ Hamadera-eki-mae	Ebisucho ↔ Abikomichi
Morning peak hours	3–4 minutes	12–15 minutes	15-30 minutes
Evening peak hours	5 minutes	10 minutes	25-30 minutes
Daytime & all-day weekends/holidays	6–8 minutes	12–14 minutes	25-30 minutes
Early morning & night	12–15 minutes	20–30 minutes	30-60 minutes

== Rolling stock ==
=== Current ===
- 161 series
- 351 series
- 501 series
- 601 series
- 701 series
- 1001 series
- 1101 series
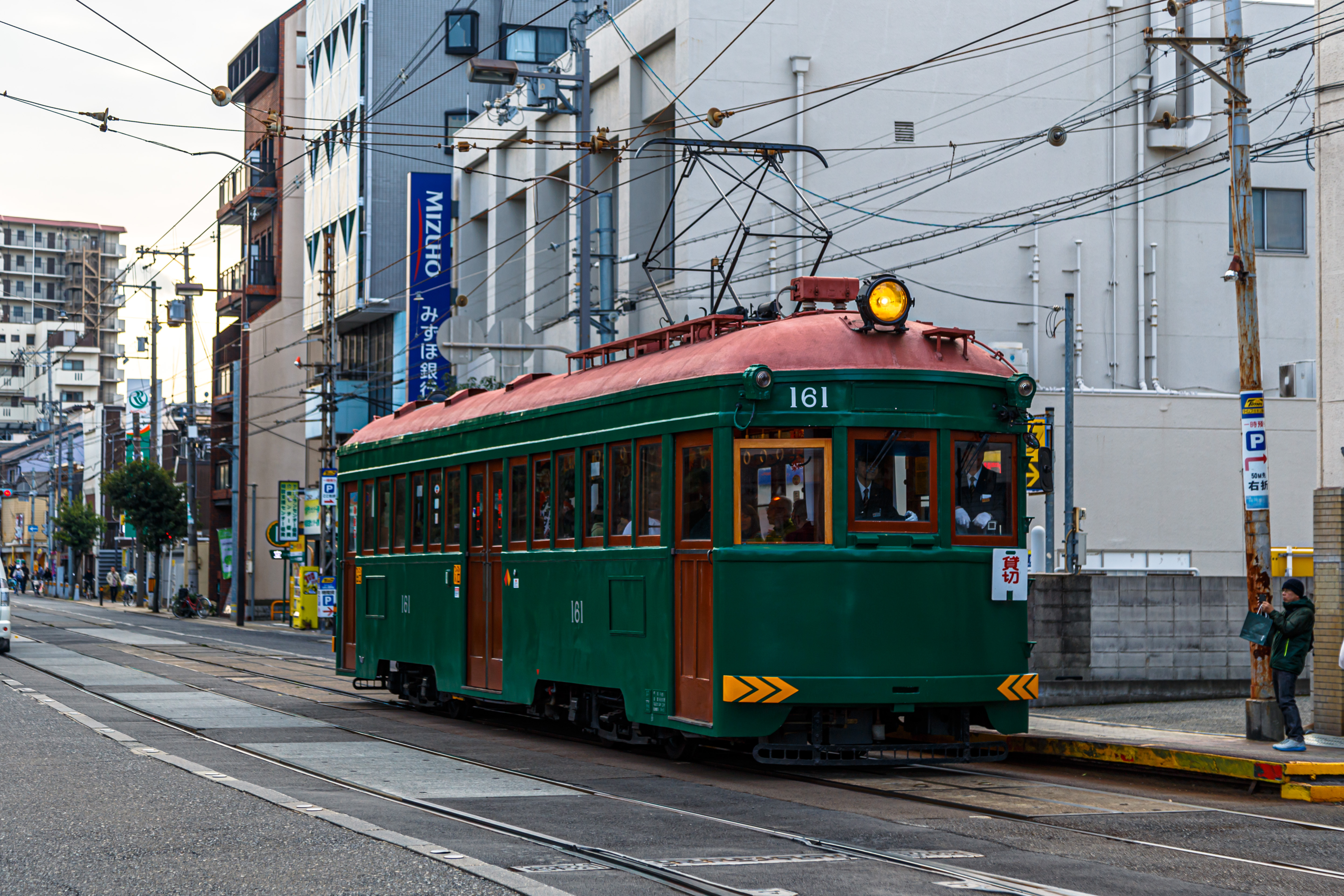
161 series

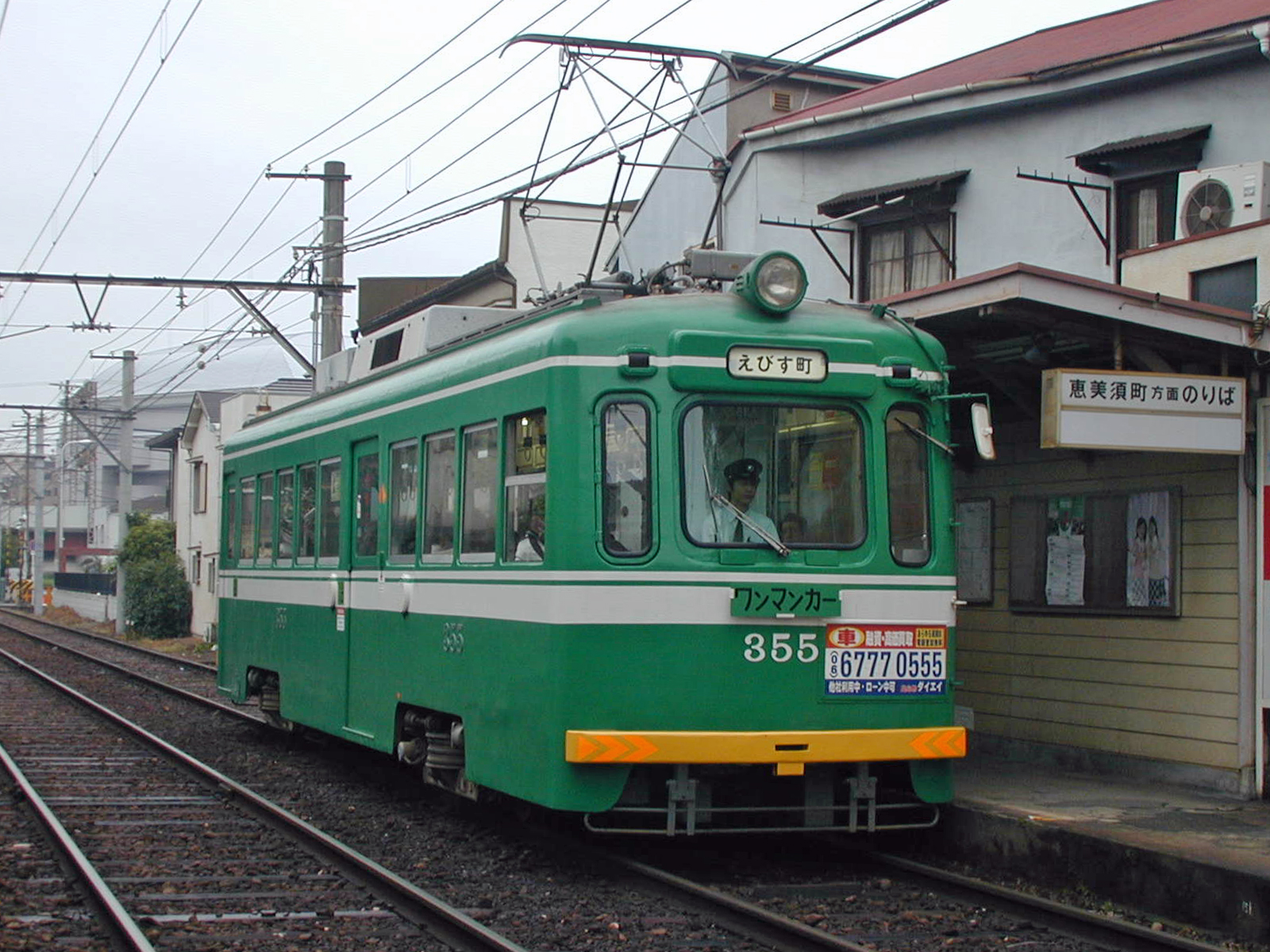
351 series

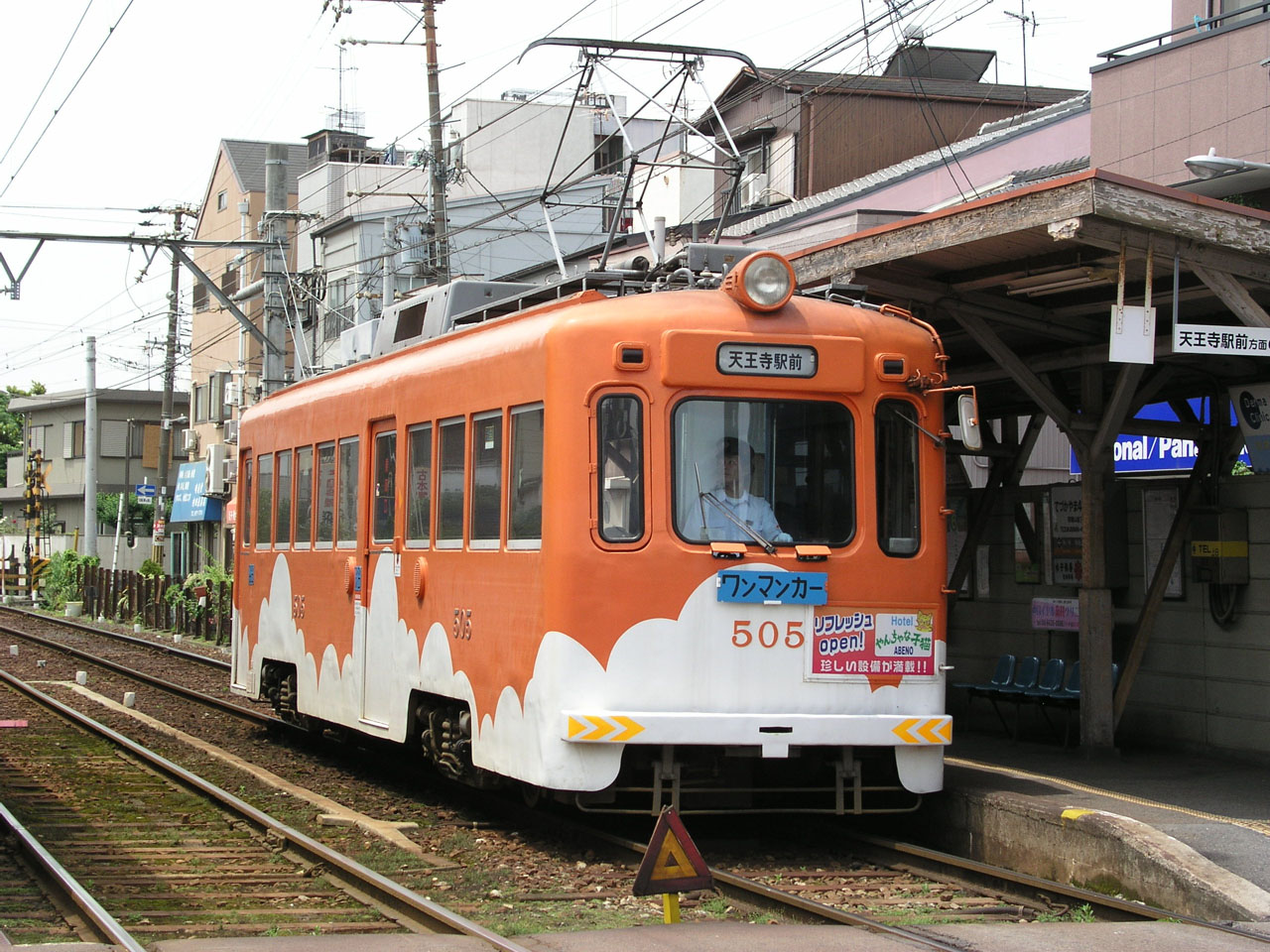
501 series

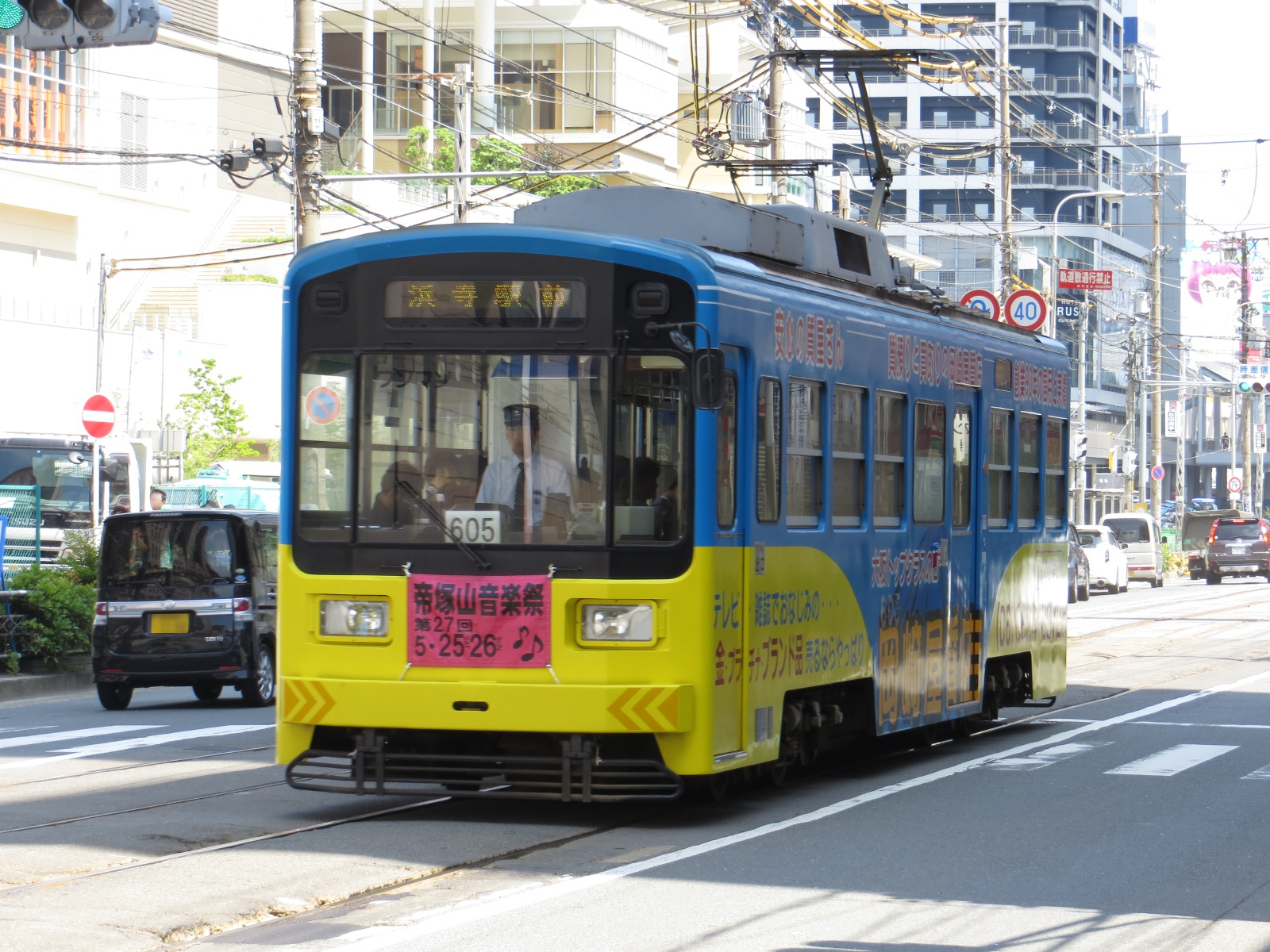
601 series

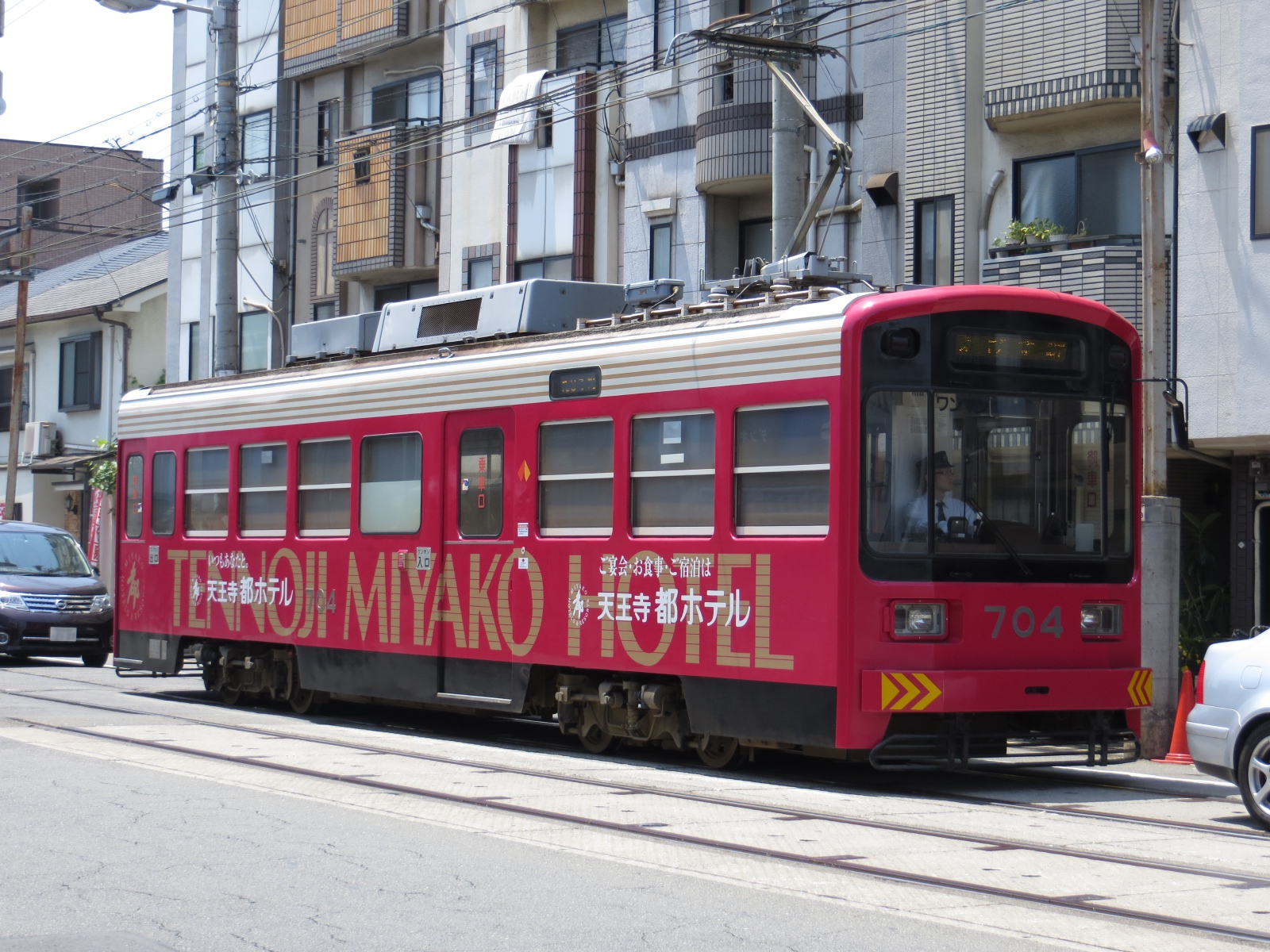
701 series

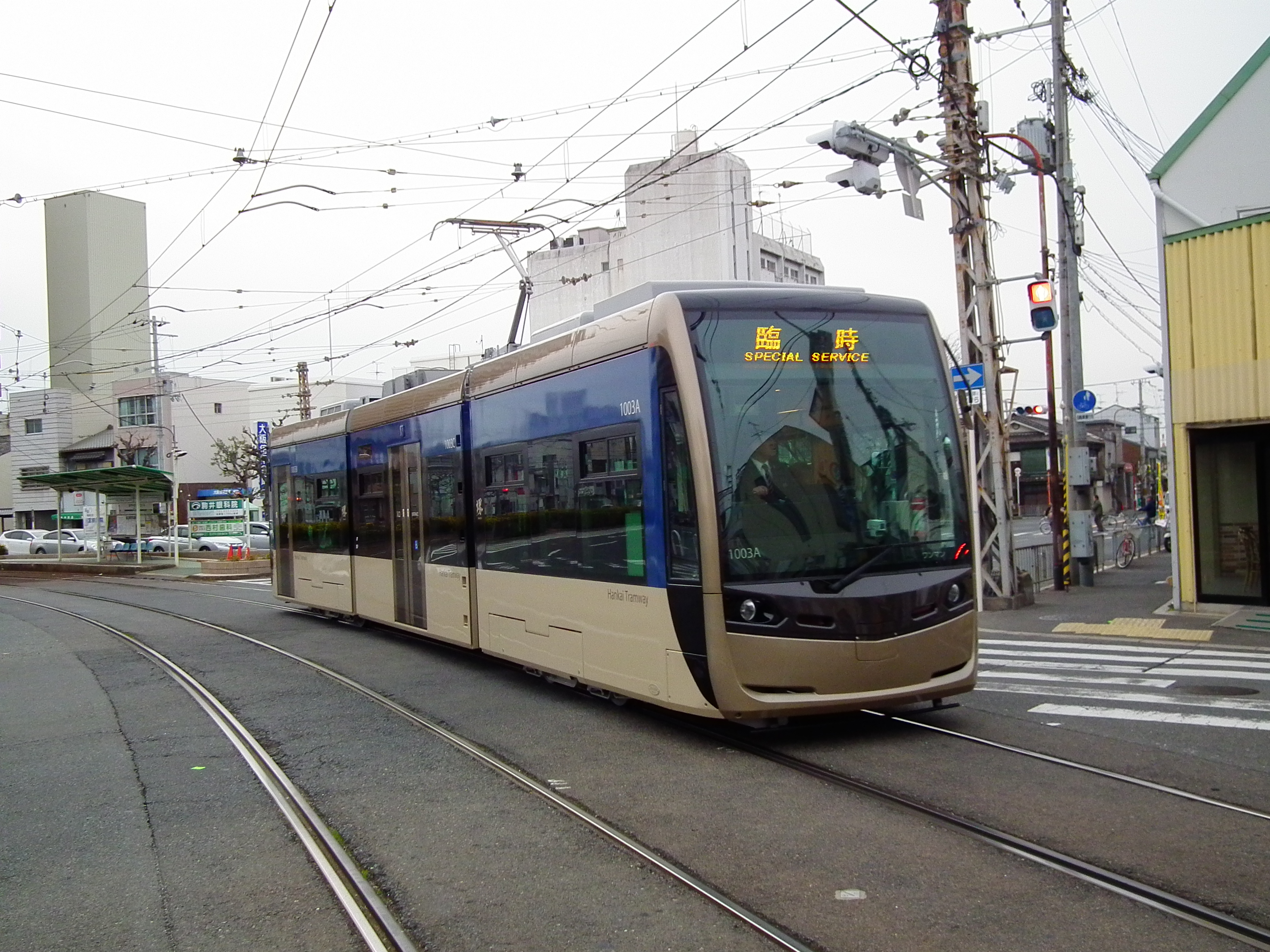
1001 series

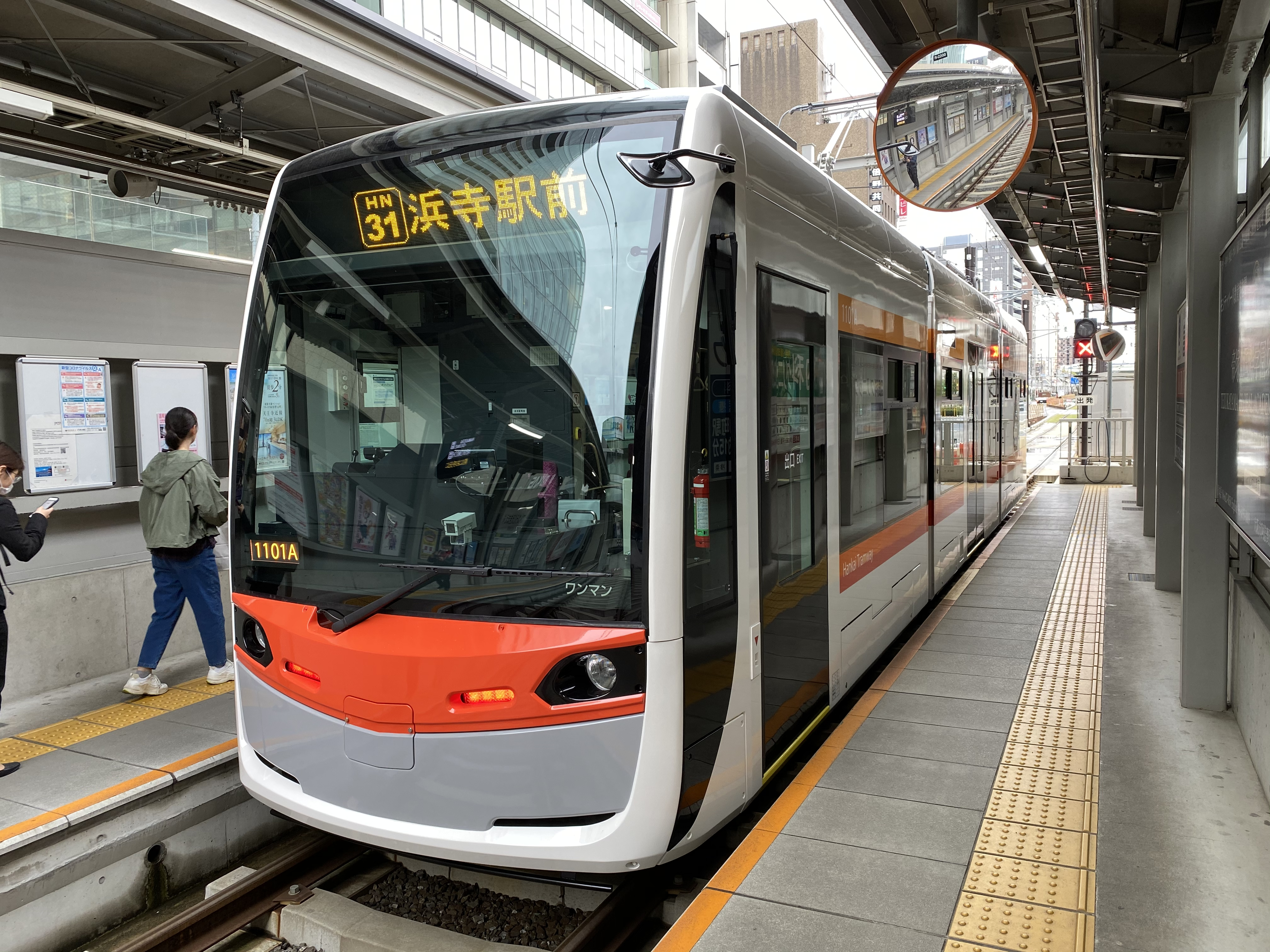
1101 series

== Former lines when owned by Nankai Railway ==
Line	Route	Length
Hirano Line	Imaike — Hirano	5.9 km (3.7 mi)
Ohama Branch Line	Shukuin — Ohama-kaigan	1.4 km (0.87 mi)

== History ==
Hankai Tramway Co., Ltd. was founded in 1910. In 1915, the company merged with the Nankai Railway which runs both north and south in Osaka. The city's overall tram network was once extensive. As motorization developed as an alternative form of transportation along with the construction of subway lines underneath major routes, the trams lost their passengers, causing Osaka's once-extensive tram network to shrink, with only the Hankai and Uemachi tram lines remaining. By 1980, the company split from Nankai and became an independent company, with Nankai holding 100% of the Hankai stock. Therefore, Hankai still uses the Nankai symbol as its logo.

On January 31, 2016, the stop at Sumiyoshikoen was removed and the Uemachi line terminus was moved to Sumiyoshi, reducing the Uemachi line's length by 200 m (660 ft) to 4.4 km (2.7 mi).

On February 1, 2020, the stop at Ebisucho was relocated 100m south to provide 100% barrier-free access, reducing the Hankai line's length from 14.1 km (8.8 mi) to 14.0 km (8.7 mi).
