= Abikochō Station =

Railway station in Osaka, Japan

Abikochō Station 我孫子町駅
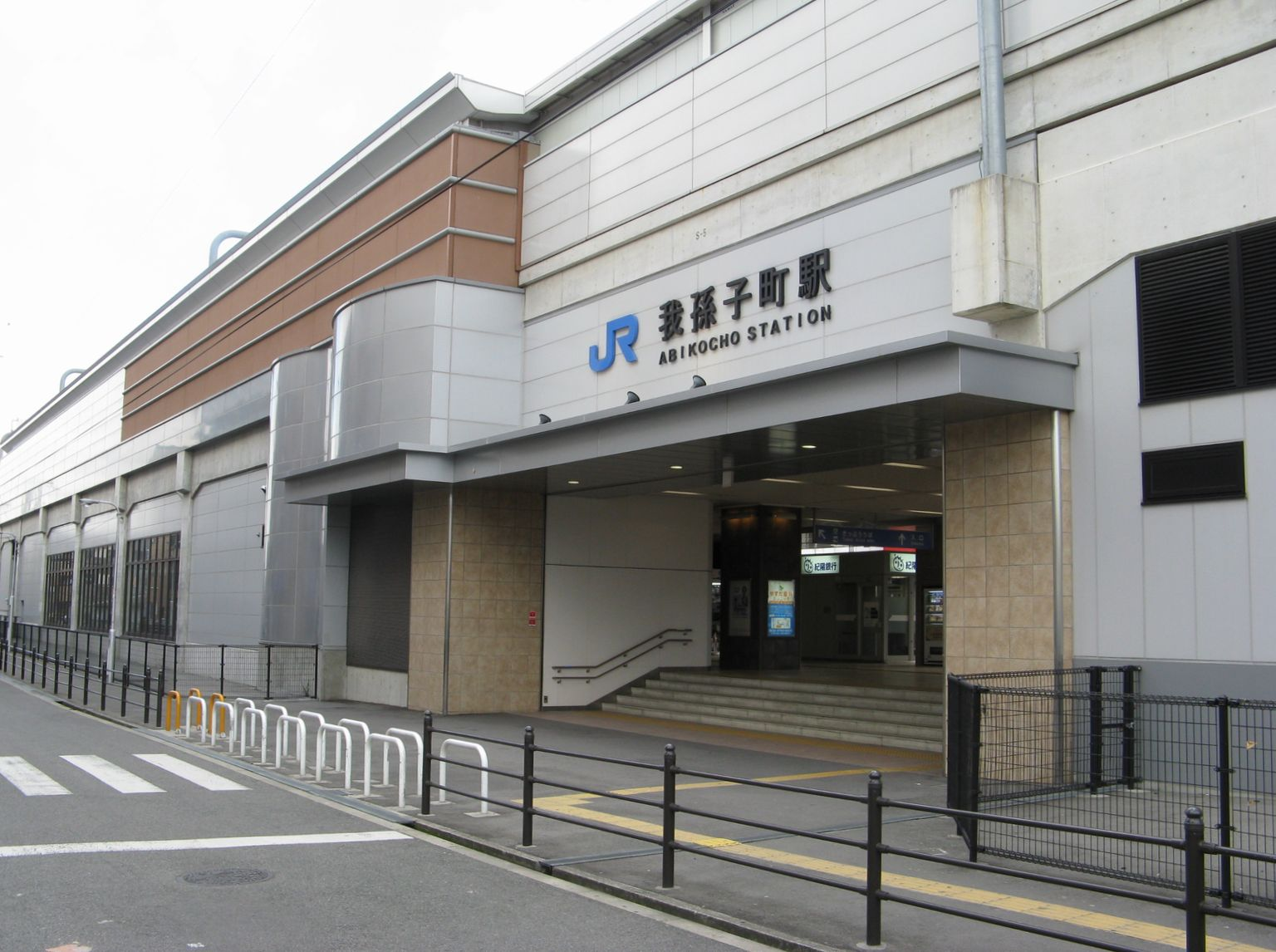
- Abikochō Station, 2008

General information
- Location: 3-14-18 Abiko, Sumiyoshi, Osaka, Osaka （大阪市住吉区杉本三丁目2-73） Japan
- Coordinates: 34.6021°N 135.5066°E
- Operator: West Japan Railway Company
- Line: Hanwa Line
- Connections: Bus stop

Other information
- Station code: JR-R25

History
- Opened: 1929

Services
Preceding station	JR West	Following station
Sugimotocho towards Wakayama	Hanwa Line Local	Nagai towards Tennoji
Location

Abikochō Station (我孫子町駅, Abikochō-eki) is a railway station on the West Japan Railway Company Hanwa Line in Sumiyoshi-ku, Osaka, Osaka Prefecture, Japan.

== Layout ==
This station has two elevated side platforms serving a track each. The northbound platform was elevated in 2004 and the southbound one in 2006.

1	■ Hanwa Line	for Ōtori, Hineno and Wakayama
2	■ Hanwa Line	for Tennōji

== History ==
- March 2018 - Station numbering was introduced with Abikochō being assigned station number JR-R25.
