= Minami-Tanabe Station =

Railway station in Osaka, Japan

Minami-Tanabe Station 南田辺駅
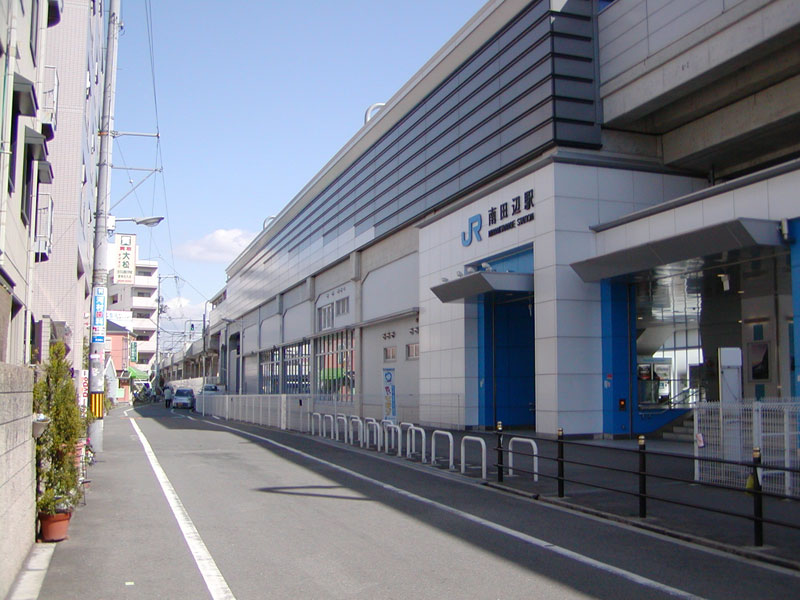
- Minami-Tanabe Station

General information
- Location: 4-10, Nagaikechō, Abeno, Osaka, Osaka （大阪市阿倍野区長池町4-10） Japan
- Coordinates: 34°37′32.42″N 135°31′14.32″E
- Operator: JR West
- Line: Hanwa Line
- Platforms: 2 side platforms
- Tracks: 2

Construction
- Structure type: Elevated
- Cycle facilities: Bicycle parking
- Accessible: Yes

Other information
- Station code: JR-R22

History
- Opened: 1929

Services
Preceding station	JR West	Following station
Tsurugaoka towards Wakayama	Hanwa Line Local	Bishoen towards Tennoji
Location

Minami-Tanabe Station (南田辺駅, Minami-tanabe-eki) is a railway station on the West Japan Railway Company Hanwa Line in Abeno-ku, Osaka, Osaka Prefecture, Japan. The station opened on July 18, 1929. When the platforms and the tracks were located on the ground, the station was located in Yamasaka Nichome, Higashisumiyoshi-ku.

== History ==
- 18 July 1929 - Station opens
- March 2018 - Station numbering was introduced with Minami-Tanabe being assigned station number JR-R22.

== Layout ==
Minami-Tanabe Station has two elevated side platforms serving a track each.

=== Platforms ===
1	■ Hanwa Line	for Ōtori, Hineno and Wakayama
2	■ Hanwa Line	for Tennōji
