= Sugimotochō Station =

Railway station in Osaka, Japan

Sugimotochō Station 杉本町駅
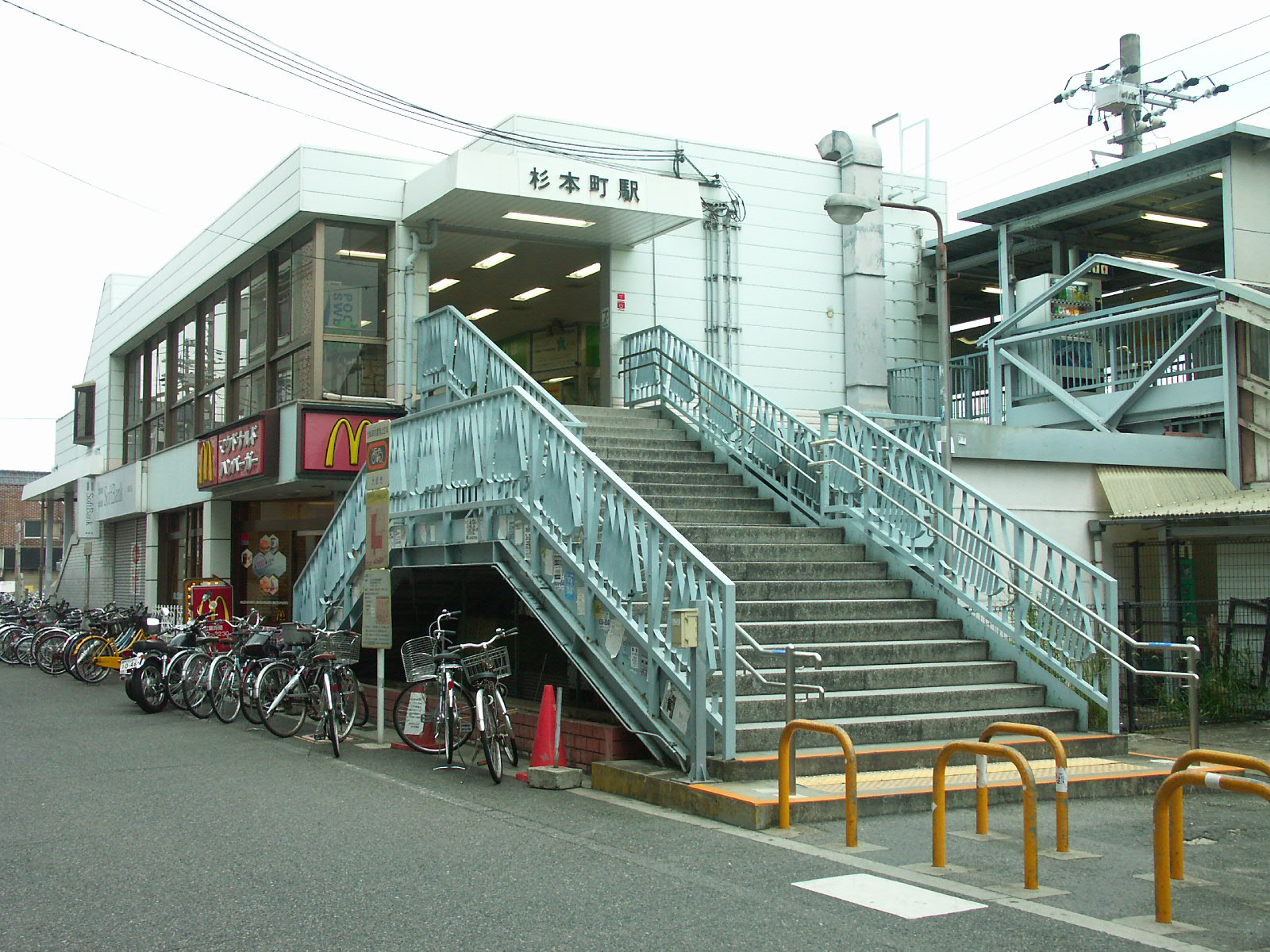
- Sugimotochō station, October 2007

General information
- Location: 2-73, Sugimoto Sanchome, Sumiyoshi, Osaka, Osaka （大阪市住吉区杉本三丁目2-73） Japan
- Coordinates: 34.5931°N 135.5032°E
- Operator: West Japan Railway Company
- Line: Hanwa Line
- Platforms: 2 Island platforms
- Connections: Bus stop

Construction
- Structure type: Ground level

Other information
- Station code: JR-R26

History
- Opened: 1929

Services
Preceding station	JR West	Following station
Asaka towards Wakayama	Hanwa Line Local	Abikocho towards Tennoji
Location

Sugimotochō Station (杉本町駅, Sugimotochō-eki) is a railway station on the West Japan Railway Company Hanwa Line in Sugimoto Sanchome, Sumiyoshi-ku, Osaka, Osaka Prefecture, Japan.

== Layout ==
- There are two island platforms with four tracks; however, Tracks 1 and 3 are fenced as trains on these tracks pass through the station without stopping.

1	■ Hanwa Line	passing trains
2	■ Hanwa Line	for Tennoji
3	■ Hanwa Line	passing trains
4	■ Hanwa Line	for Otori, Hineno and Wakayama

== History ==
- 1929 - Station opened
- March 2018 - Station numbering was introduced with Sugimotochō being assigned station number JR-R26.

== Former adjacent stations ==
«	Service	»
JR West
Kansai Main Line Freight Branch (Hanwa Freight Line)
Yao	-	Terminus
