= Tsukuno Station =

Railway station in Sakai, Japan

Tsukuno Station 津久野駅
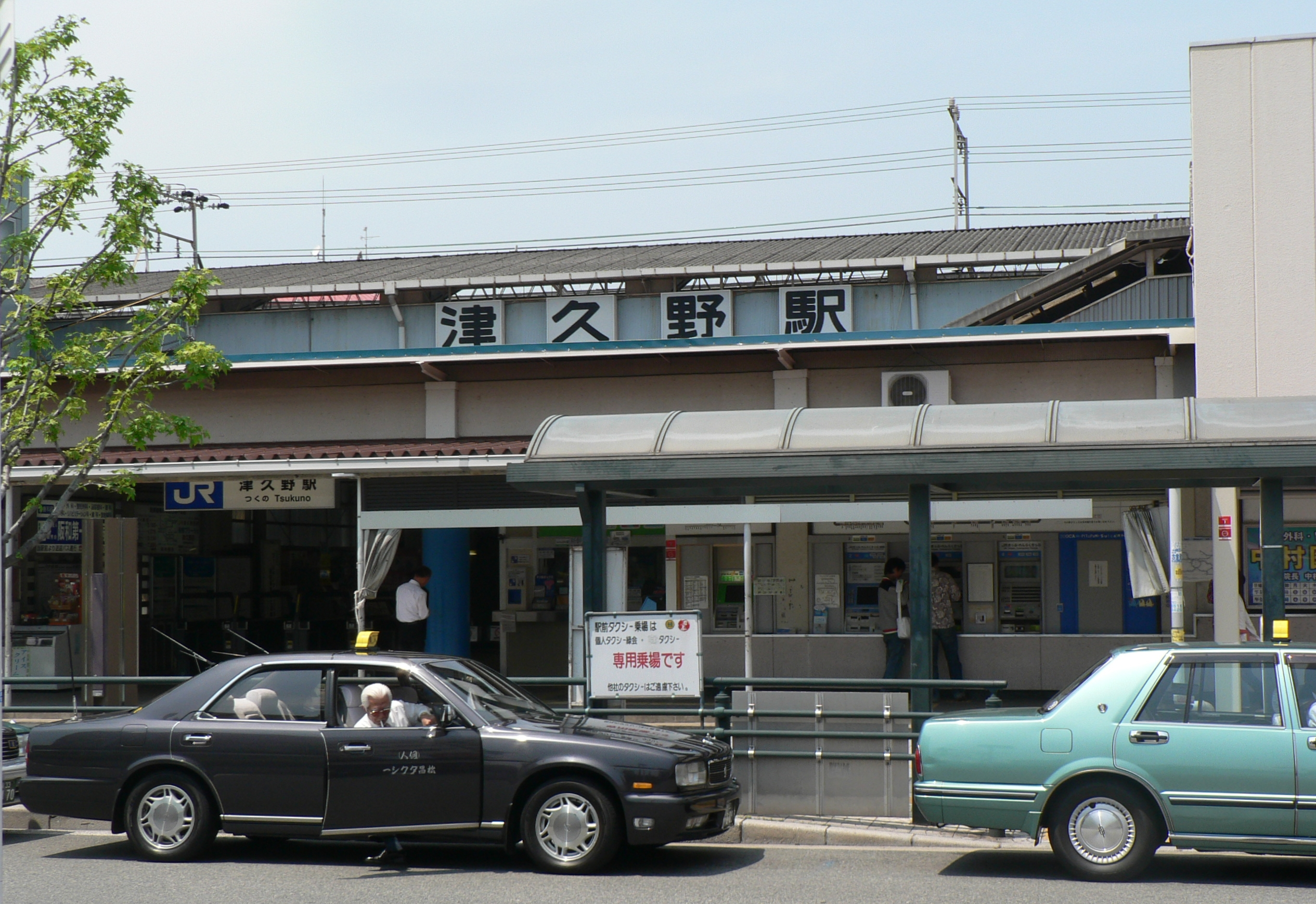
- Tsukuno Station, May 2007

General information
- Location: 2-1 Tsukuno-cho, Nishi-ku, Sakai-shi, Osaka 593-8322; Japan
- Coordinates: 34.5423°N 135.4682°E
- Owner: West Japan Railway Company
- Operator: West Japan Railway Company
- Line: R Hanwa Line
- Distance: 13.7 km (8.5 miles) from Tennōji
- Platforms: 2 side platforms
- Connections: Bus stop

Other information
- Status: Staffed
- Station code: JR-R32
- Website: Official website

History
- Opened: 1 September 1960

Passengers
- FY2019: 8325 daily
Location
- Location within Osaka Prefecture Location within Japan

Tsukuno Station (津久野駅, Tsukuno-eki) is a passenger railway station in located in Nishi-ku, Sakai, Osaka Prefecture, Japan, operated by West Japan Railway Company (JR West).

== Lines ==
Tsukuno Station is served by the Hanwa Line, and is located 13.7 kilometers from the northern terminus of the line at Tennōji.

== Station layout ==
The station consists of two opposed elevated side platforms with the station building underneath. The station is staffed.

=== Platforms ===
1	■ Hanwa Line	for Ōtori, Hineno, and Wakayama
2	■ Hanwa Line	for Tennōji

== Adjacent stations ==
«	Service	»
Hanwa Line
Regional Rapid: Does not stop at this station
Direct Rapid: Does not stop at this station
Rapid Service: Does not stop at this station
Kansai Airport Rapid: Does not stop at this station
Kishuji Rapid: Does not stop at this station
Limited Express Kuroshio: Does not stop at this station
Limited Express Haruka: Does not stop at this station
Uenoshiba	Local	Ōtori

== History ==
Tsukuno Station opened on 1 September 1960.

Station numbering was introduced in March 2018 with Tsukuno being assigned station number JR-R32.

== Passenger statistics ==
In fiscal 2019, the station was used by an average of 2223 passengers daily (boarding passengers only).

== Surrounding Area ==
- Yamato River
- Sakai Women's Junior College
- Kaorigaoka Liberte High School
- Sakai Liberal Junior and Senior High School
- Sakai City Asakayama Junior High School

== History ==
Tsukuno Station opened on 1 September 1960. With the privatization of the Japan National Railways (JNR) on 1 April 1987, the station came under the aegis of the West Japan Railway Company.

== Passenger statistics ==
In fiscal 2019, the station was used by an average of 8325 passengers daily (boarding passengers only).

== Surrounding Area ==
- Sakai City Medical Center
- Sakai City Tsukuno Elementary School
- Sakai City Tsukuno Junior High School
- Sakai City Hamadera Junior High School

== See also ==
- List of railway stations in Japan
