= Shinge Station =

Railway station in Sennan, Osaka Prefecture, Japan

Shinge Station 新家駅
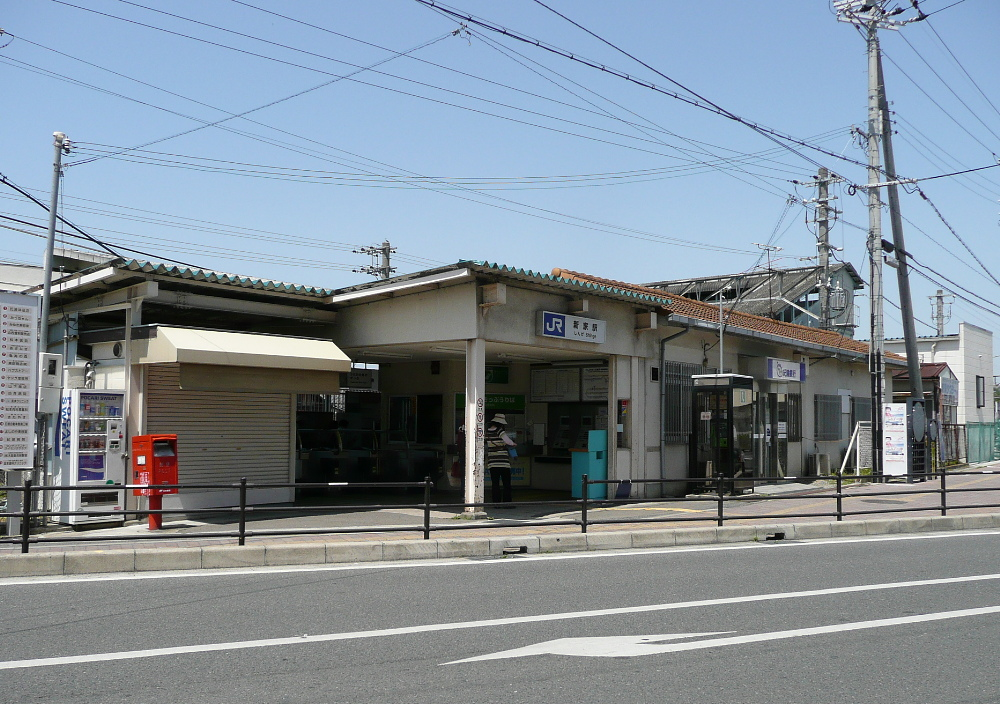
- Shinge Station, May 2008

General information
- Location: 2959-3 Shinge, Sennan-shi, Osaka-fu 590-0522; Japan
- Coordinates: 34.360767°N 135.281686°E
- System: JR-West commuter rail station
- Owner: West Japan Railway Company
- Operator: West Japan Railway Company
- Line: R Hanwa Line
- Distance: 38.6 km (24.0 miles) from Tennōji
- Platforms: 2 side platforms
- Tracks: 2
- Train operators: West Japan Railway Company

Other information
- Status: Staffed
- Station code: JR-R47
- Website: Official website

History
- Opened: 16 June 1930

Passengers
- FY2019: 2706 daily
Services
Preceding station	JR-West	Following station
Hanwa Line
Nagataki	Local	Izumi-Sunagawa
Nagataki	Regional Rapid Service (southbound only)	Izumi-Sunagawa
Nagataki	Kishuji Rapid Service (except part of trains in the morning)	Izumi-Sunagawa
Direct Rapid Service: Does not stop at this station
Rapid Service: Does not stop at this station
Limited Express Kuroshio: Does not stop at this station
Location
- Location within Osaka Prefecture Location within Japan

Shinge Station (新家駅, Shinge-eki) is a passenger railway station in located in the city of Sennan, Osaka Prefecture, Japan, operated by West Japan Railway Company (JR West).

== Lines ==
Shinge Station is served by the Hanwa Line, and is located 38.6 kilometers from the northern terminus of the line at Tennōji.

== Station layout ==
The station consists of two opposed side platforms connected to the station building by a footbridge. The station is staffed.

=== Platforms ===
1	■ Hanwa Line	for Kii and Wakayama
2	■ Hanwa Line	for Hineno and Tennoji

== History ==
Shinge Station opened on 16 June 1930, as a provisional station and was officially opened as a full passenger station on 3 March 1931. With the privatization of the Japan National Railways (JNR) on 1 April 1987, the station came under the aegis of the West Japan Railway Company.

Station numbering was introduced in March 2018 with Shinge being assigned station number JR-R47.

== Passenger statistics ==
In fiscal 2019, the station was used by an average of 2706 passengers daily (boarding passengers only).

== Surrounding Area ==
- Former Sennan City Shinge Kindergarten
- Japan Post Sennan Shinge Post Office

== See also ==
- List of railway stations in Japan
