= Bishōen Station =

Railway station in Osaka, Japan

Bishōen Station 美章園駅
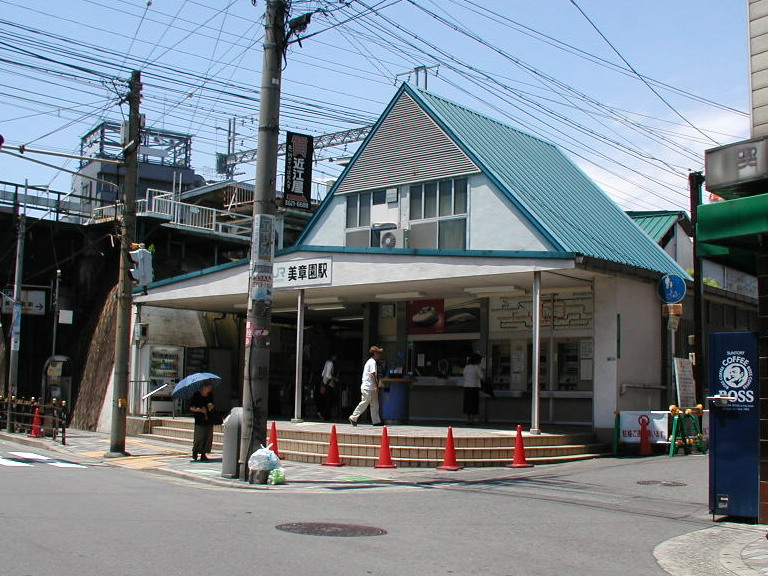
- Bishōen Station

General information
- Location: 18, Bishōen 1-chōme, Abeno, Osaka, Osaka （大阪市阿倍野区美章園一丁目18） Japan
- Coordinates: 34°38′17.04″N 135°31′26.27″E
- Owner: West Japan Railway Company
- Operator: West Japan Railway Company
- Line: R Hanwa Line
- Platforms: 2 side platforms
- Tracks: 2
- Connections: Bus stop

Other information
- Status: Staffed
- Station code: JR-R21

History
- Opened: 3 June 1931

Services
Preceding station	JR West	Following station
Minami-Tanabe towards Wakayama	Hanwa Line Local	Tennoji Terminus
Location

Bishōen Station (美章園駅, Bishōen-eki) is a railway station on the West Japan Railway Company Hanwa Line in Abeno-ku, Osaka, Osaka Prefecture, Japan. The station opened on 3 June 1931.

== Layout ==
This station has two elevated side platforms serving a track each.

1	■ Hanwa Line	for Ōtori and Wakayama
2	■ Hanwa Line	to Tennōji

== Surroundings ==
- Koboreguchi Station (Kintetsu Minami Osaka Line)
- Super-Sanko Bishoen
- Meijo Gakuin High School
- Osaka Girl's Senior High School
- Osaka Prefectural Tennoji High School
- Osaka City Kogei Senior High School
- Osaka College of Art (The Group of Osaka University of Arts)

=== Bus route ===
Osaka Municipal Transportation Bureau (Bishoen)
Route 6 for Abenobashi / for Sunjiyata via Shirasagi Koen-mae

== History ==
- 3 June 1931 - Bishoen Station opened on the Hanwa Railway Line between Hanwa Tennoji and Minami-Tanabe stations.
- 1 December 1940 - Hanwa Railway was consolidated by Nankai Railway and Bishoen Station became a train station on the Nankai Railway Yamate Line.
- 1 May 1944 - The Nankai Railway Yamate Line was nationalized and Bishoen Station became a train station on the Japanese National Railways Hanwa Line.
- 14 February 1945 - The station was closed after Abeno-ku was bombed by Boeing B-29 of the US Forces.
- 15 April 1947 - The station was reopened.
- 1958 - The renovation of the station was started.
- 13 May 1958 - The renovation of the station was completed.
- August 1969 - The west gate was situated.
- 1 April 1987 - JNR was privatized and Bishoen Station became a train station operated by West Japan Railway Company.
- March 2018 - Station numbering was introduced with Bishōen being assigned station number JR-R21.
