= Shinodayama Station =

Railway station in Izumi, Osaka Prefecture, Japan

Shinodayama Station 信太山駅
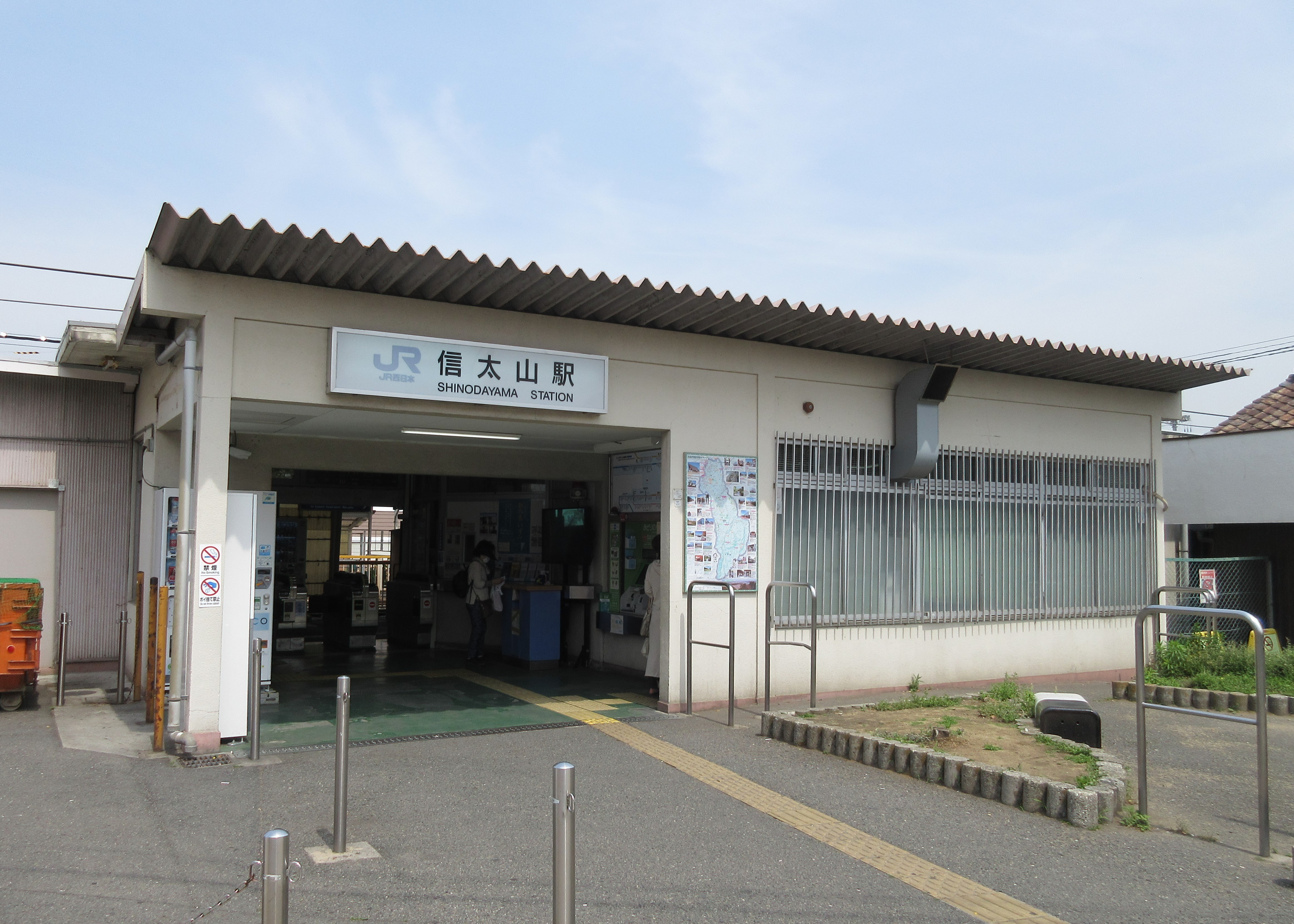
- Shinodayama Station, May 2019

General information
- Location: 6-17 Ikegamicho 1chome, Izumi-shi, Osaka-fu 594-0083; Japan
- Coordinates: 34°29′58.96″N 135°25′57.79″E
- Owner: West Japan Railway Company
- Operator: West Japan Railway Company
- Line: R Hanwa Line
- Distance: 19.4 km (12.1 miles) from Tennōji
- Platforms: 2 side platforms
- Connections: Bus stop

Other information
- Status: Staffed
- Station code: JR-R36
- Website: Official website

History
- Opened: 18 July 1929

Passengers
- FY2019: 3,930 daily
Location
- Location within Osaka Prefecture Location within Japan

Shinodayama Station (信太山駅, Shinodayama-eki) is a passenger railway station in located in the city of Izumi, Osaka Prefecture, Japan, operated by West Japan Railway Company (JR West).

== Lines ==
Shinodayama Station is served by the Hanwa Line, and is located 19.4 kilometres (12.1 miles) from the northern terminus of the line at Tennōji.

== Station layout ==
The station consists of two opposed side platforms connected by an underground passage. The station is staffed.

=== Platforms ===
1	■ R Hanwa Line	for Kansai Airport and Wakayama
2	■ R Hanwa Line	for Tennōji

== Adjacent stations ==
«	Service	»
JR West
Hanwa Line
Kita-Shinoda	Local	Izumi-Fuchū
Kita-Shinoda	Regional Rapid Service	Izumi-Fuchū
Direct Rapid Service: Does not stop at this station
Rapid Service: Does not stop at this station
Kansai Airport Rapid Service: Does not stop at this station
Kishuji Rapid Service: Does not stop at this station
Limited Express Kuroshio: Does not stop at this station
Limited Express Haruka: Does not stop at this station

== History ==
Shinodayama Station opened on 18 July 1929. With the privatization of the Japan National Railways (JNR) on 1 April 1987, the station came under the aegis of the West Japan Railway Company.

Station numbering was introduced in March 2018 with Shinodayama being assigned station number JR-R36.

== Passenger statistics ==
In fiscal 2019, the station was used by an average of 3,930 passengers daily (boarding passengers only).

== Surrounding area ==
- Ikegami-Sone site
- Osaka Prefectural Museum of Yayoi Culture
- Hakata jin'ya site
- Osaka Prefectural Izumi Comprehensive High School
- Osaka Prefectural Hakata High School
- Izumi City Hakata Elementary School

== See also ==
- List of railway stations in Japan
