= Kita-Shinoda Station =

Railway station in Izumi, Osaka Prefecture, Japan

Kita-Shinoda Station 北信太駅
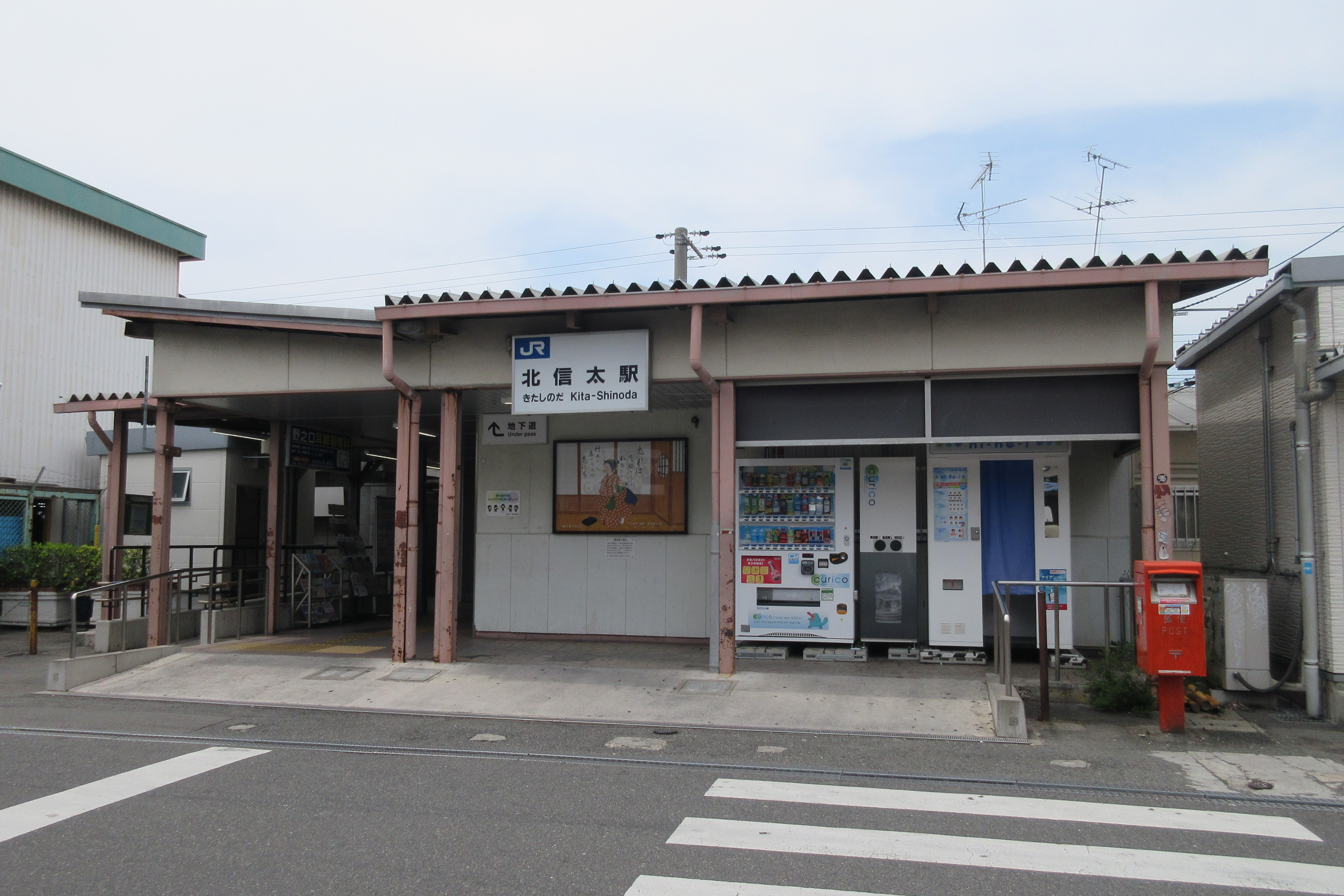
- Kita-Shinoda Station, May 2019

General information
- Location: 61-29 Taicho, Izumi-shi, Osaka-fu 594-0003; Japan
- Coordinates: 34°30′35.91″N 135°26′28.15″E
- Owner: West Japan Railway Company
- Operator: West Japan Railway Company
- Line: R Hanwa Line
- Distance: 18.0 km (11.2 miles) from Tennōji
- Platforms: 2 side platforms

Other information
- Status: Staffed
- Station code: JR-R35
- Website: Official website

History
- Opened: 2 February 1929

Passengers
- FY2019: 6150 daily
Location
- Location within Osaka Prefecture Location within Japan

Kita-Shinoda Station (北信太駅, Kita-Shinoda-eki) is a passenger railway station in located in the city of Izumi, Osaka Prefecture, Japan, operated by West Japan Railway Company (JR West).

== Lines ==
Kita-Shinoda Station is served by the Hanwa Line, and is located 18.0 kilometers from the northern terminus of the line at Tennōji.

== Station layout ==
The station consists of two opposed side platforms connected by an underground passage. The station is staffed.

=== Platforms ===
1	■ R Hanwa Line	for Kansai Airport and Wakayama
2	■ R Hanwa Line	for Tennōji

== Adjacent stations ==
«	Service	»
JR West
Hanwa Line
Tonoki	Local	Shinodayama
Tonoki	Regional Rapid Service	Shinodayama
Direct Rapid Service: Does not stop at this station
Rapid Service: Does not stop at this station
Kansai Airport Rapid Service: Does not stop at this station
Kishuji Rapid Service: Does not stop at this station
Limited Express Kuroshio: Does not stop at this station
Limited Express Haruka: Does not stop at this station

== History ==
Kita-Shinoda Station opened on 2 February 1929 as Kuzunoha Inari Stop (葛葉稲荷停留場, Kuzunoha Inari-teishajo). It was elevated to a full station on 1 May 1944 and renamed to its present name. With the privatization of the Japan National Railways (JNR) on 1 April 1987, the station came under the aegis of the West Japan Railway Company.

Station numbering was introduced in March 2018 with Kita-Shinoda being assigned station number JR-R35.

== Passenger statistics ==
In fiscal 2019, the station was used by an average of 6150 passengers daily (boarding passengers only).

== Surrounding area ==
- Shinodanomori Kuzuha Inari Shrine.
- Shinoda no Mori no Kagamiike Historic Site Park
- Shinta Kaibukiyama Kofun
- Kita-Shinoda Ekimae-dori Shopping Street
- Osaka Prefectural Shinoda High School
- Izumi City Shinoda Junior High School

== See also ==
- List of railway stations in Japan
