= Nagataki Station =

Railway station in Izumisano, Osaka Prefecture, Japan

Nagataki Station 長滝駅
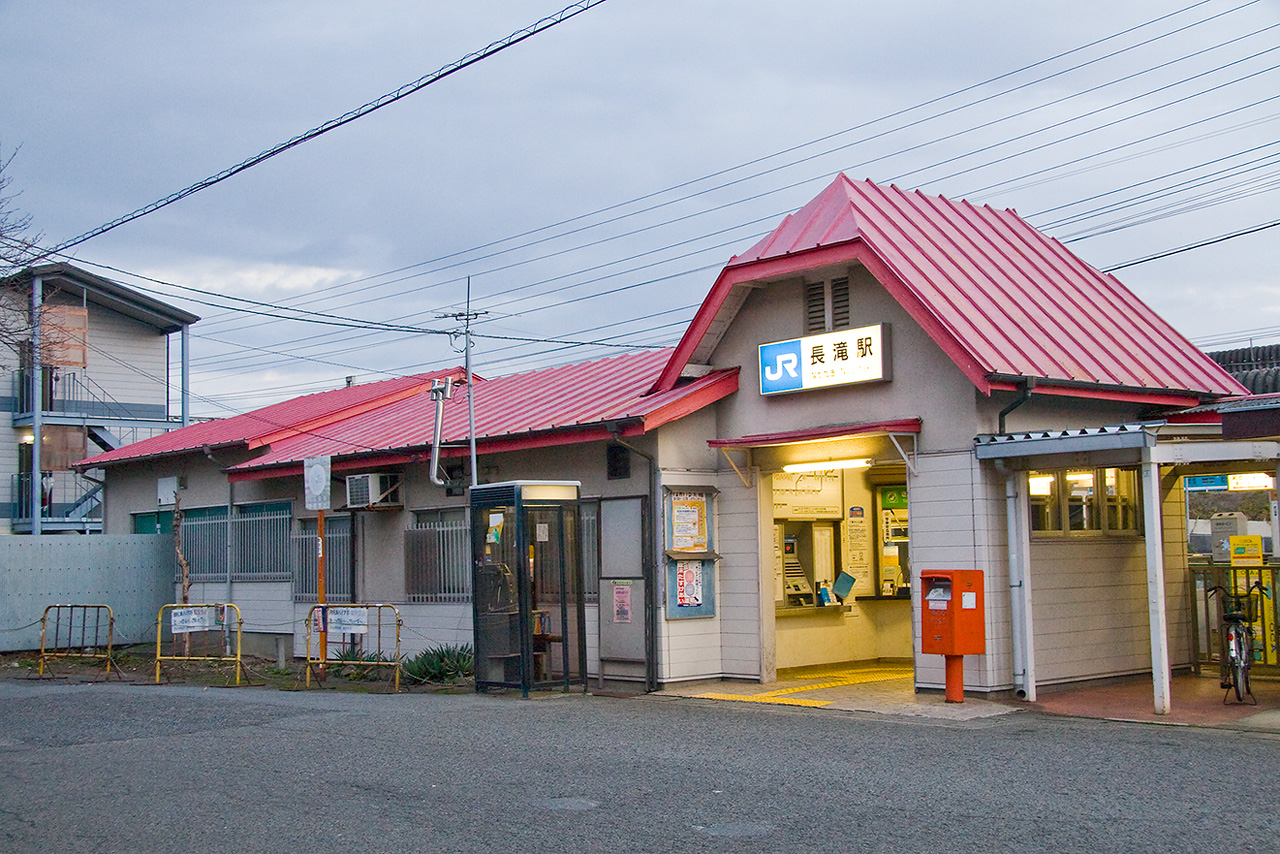
- Nagataki Station, December 2007

General information
- Location: 1141 Nagataki, Izumisano-shi, Osaka-fu 598-0034; Japan
- Coordinates: 34.3817°N 135.3194°E
- System: JR-West commuter rail station
- Owner: West Japan Railway Company
- Operator: West Japan Railway Company
- Line: R Hanwa Line
- Distance: 36.3 km (22.6 miles) from Tennōji
- Platforms: 1 island platform
- Tracks: 2
- Train operators: West Japan Railway Company

Construction
- Structure type: At grade

Other information
- Status: Unstaffed
- Station code: JR-R46
- Website: Official website

History
- Opened: 16 June 1930

Passengers
- FY2019: 942 daily
Services
Preceding station	JR-West	Following station
Hanwa Line
Hineno	Local	Shinge
Hineno	Regional Rapid Service (southbound only)	Shinge
Hineno	Kishuji Rapid Service (except part of trains in the morning)	Shinge
Direct Rapid Service: Does not stop at this station
Rapid Service: Does not stop at this station
Limited Express Kuroshio: Does not stop at this station
Location
- Location within Osaka Prefecture Location within Japan

Nagataki Station (長滝駅, Nagataki-eki) is a passenger railway station in located in the city of Izumisano, Osaka Prefecture, Japan, operated by West Japan Railway Company (JR West).

== Lines ==
Nagataki Station is served by the Hanwa Line, and is located 36.3 kilometers from the northern terminus of the line at Tennōji.

== Station layout ==
The station consists of one island platform connected to the station building by a footbridge. The station is unattended.

=== Platforms ===
1	■ R Hanwa Line	for Hineno and Tennōji
2	■ R Hanwa Line	for Wakayama

== History ==
Nagataki Station opened on 16 June 1930. With the privatization of the Japan National Railways (JNR) on 1 April 1987, the station came under the aegis of the West Japan Railway Company.

Station numbering was introduced in March 2018 with Nagataki being assigned station number JR-R46.

== Passenger statistics ==
In fiscal 2019, the station was used by an average of 942 passengers daily (boarding passengers only).

== Surrounding Area ==
- Izumisano City Haruka Kindergarten
- Aritoshi Shrine
- Ogami Shrine

== See also ==
- List of railway stations in Japan
