= Izumi-Sunagawa Station =

Railway station in Sennan, Osaka Prefecture, Japan

Izumi-Sunagawa Station 和泉砂川駅
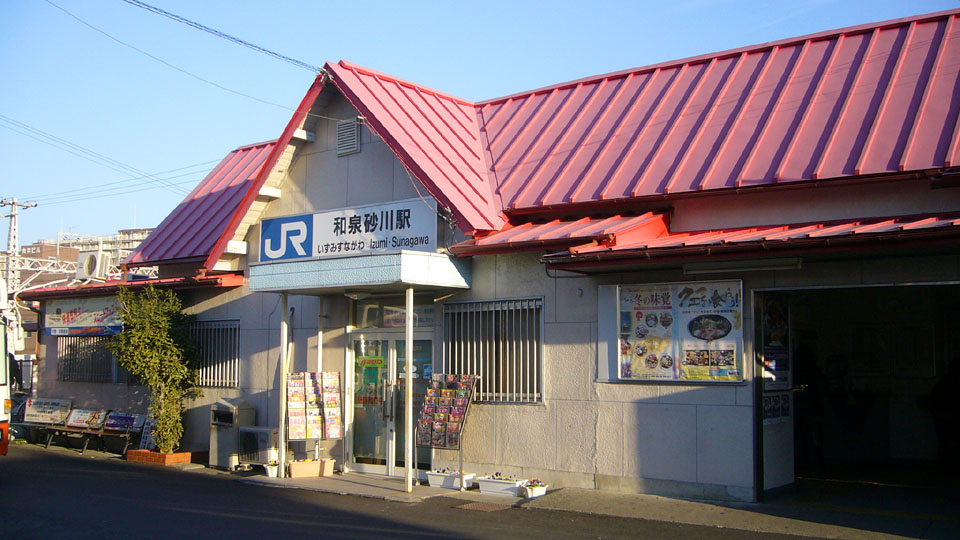
- Izumi-Sunagawa Station west exit, December 2005

General information
- Location: 165-2 Shindachimakino, Sennan-shi, Osaka-fu 590-0522; Japan
- Coordinates: 34.360767°N 135.281686°E
- System: JR-West commuter rail station
- Owner: West Japan Railway Company
- Operator: West Japan Railway Company
- Line: R Hanwa Line
- Distance: 40.5 km (25.2 miles) from Tennōji
- Platforms: 2 island platforms
- Tracks: 4
- Train operators: West Japan Railway Company

Other information
- Status: Staffed ( Midori no Madoguchi )
- Station code: JR-R48
- Website: Official website

History
- Opened: 16 June 1930
- Former names: Shindachi (to 1932), Hanwa-Sunagawa (to 1941), Sunagawaen (to 1944)

Passengers
- FY2019: 4166 daily
Services
Preceding station	JR-West	Following station
Hanwa Line
Shinge	Local	Izumi-Tottori
Shinge	Regional Rapid Service (southbound only)	Izumi-Tottori
Shinge	Kishuji Rapid Service	Izumi-Tottori
Hineno	Kishuji Rapid Service (part of trains in the morning)	Kii
Hineno	Direct Rapid Service	Kii
Hineno	Rapid Service	Kii
Hineno	Limited Express Kuroshio	Wakayama
Location
- Location within Osaka Prefecture Location within Japan

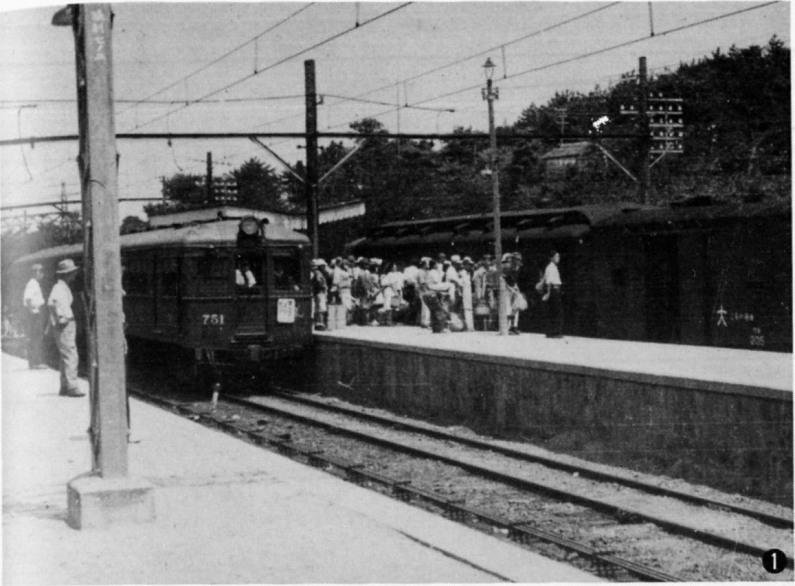
Izumi-Sunagawa Station in 1946

Izumi-Sunagawa Station (和泉砂川駅, Izumi-Sunagawa-eki) is a passenger railway station in located in the city of Sennan, Osaka Prefecture, Japan, operated by West Japan Railway Company (JR West).

== Lines ==
Izumi-Sunagawa is served by the Hanwa Line, and is located 40.5 kilometers from the northern terminus of the line at Tennōji.

== Station layout ==
The station consists of two island platforms connected to the station building by a footbridge. The station has a Midori no Madoguchi staffed ticket office.

=== Platforms ===
1, 2	■ Hanwa Line	for Hineno and Tennoji
3, 4	■ Hanwa Line	for Kii and Wakayama

== History ==
Izumi-Sunagawa Station opened on 16 June 1930 as Shindachi Station (達駅). It was renamed Hanwa-Sunagawa Station (阪和砂川) in 1932 and then Sunagawaen Station (砂川園駅) on 1 August 1941. On 1 May 1944 it became Izumi-Sunagawa Station. With the privatization of the Japan National Railways (JNR) on 1 April 1987, the station came under the aegis of the West Japan Railway Company.

Station numbering was introduced in March 2018 with Izumi-Sunagawa being assigned station number JR-R48.

The area surrounding the station has many religious facilities belonging to Honmichi, a Japanese new religion derived from Tenrikyo. Honmichi's largest building, the Sennan Temple (泉南神殿, Sennan Shinden), is located in Sennan. Many of the residents in the area are followers of Honmichi.

== Passenger statistics ==
In fiscal 2019, the station was used by an average of 4166 passengers daily (boarding passengers only).

== Surrounding area ==
- Kaieji temple ruins
- Osaka Prefectural Sennan Support School
- Museum of Ancient History
- Chokei-ji Temple
- Honmichi Sennan Temple

== See also ==
- List of railway stations in Japan
