= Higashi-Hagoromo Station =

Railway station in Takaishi, Osaka Prefecture, Japan

Coordinates: 34°32′07″N 135°26′34″E

Higashi-Hagoromo Station 東羽衣駅
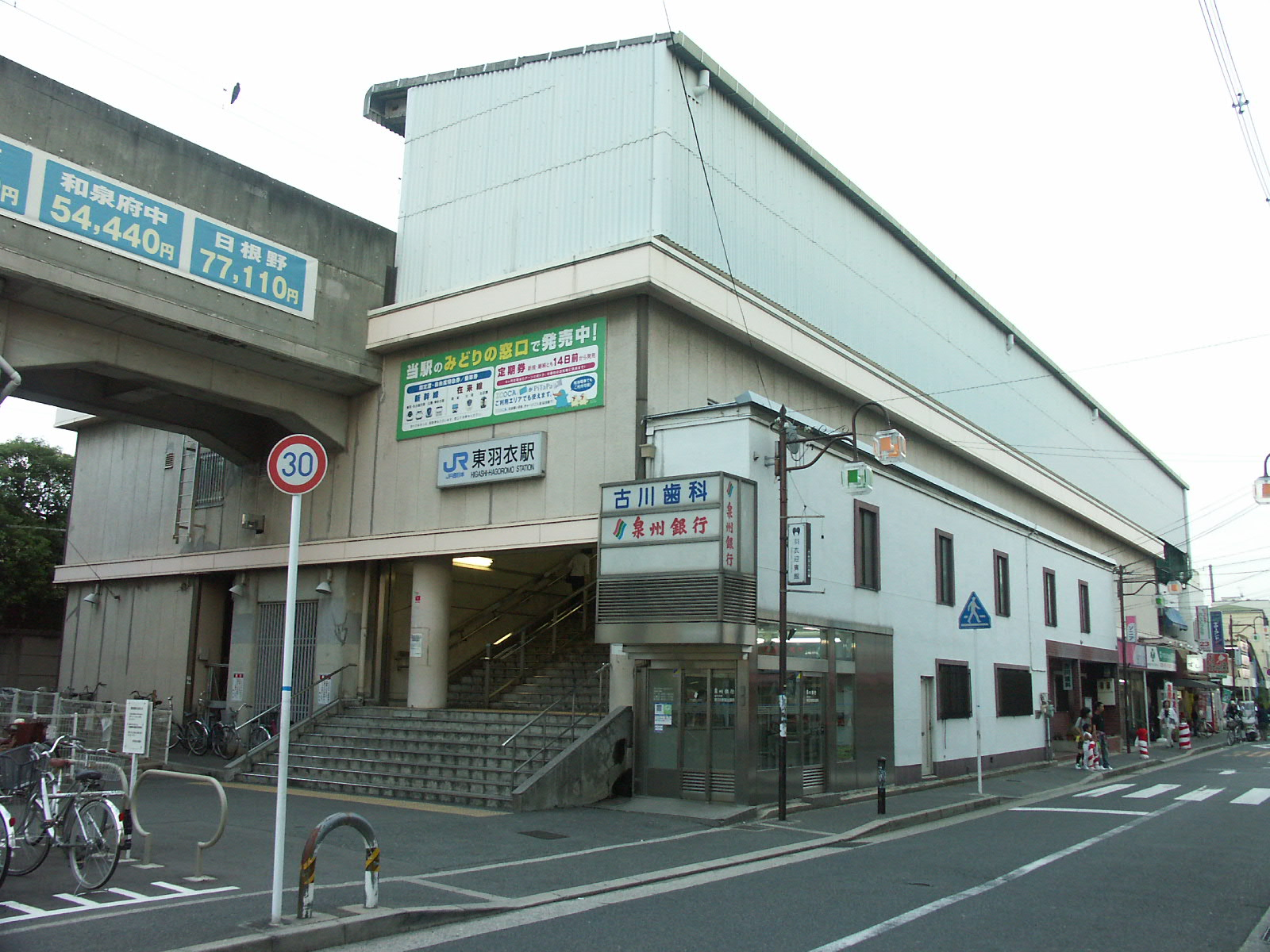
- Higashi-Hagoromo Station

General information
- Location: 18-49, Higashi-Hagoromo 1-chōme, Takaishi-shi, Osaka-fu 592-0003; Japan
- Owner: West Japan Railway Company
- Operator: West Japan Railway Company
- Line: R Hanwa Line (Hagoromo Branch)
- Platforms: 1 side platform
- Connections

Other information
- Status: Staffed
- Website: Official website

History
- Opened: 18 July 1929
- Former names: Hanwa-Hamadera (to 1941); Yamate-Hagoromo (to 1944)

Passengers
- FY2019: 5281 daily
Location
- Location within Osaka Prefecture Location within Japan

Higashi-Hagoromo Station (東羽衣駅, Higashi-Hagoromo-eki) is a passenger railway station in located in the city of Takaishi, Osaka Prefecture, Japan, operated by West Japan Railway Company (JR West).

== Lines ==
Higashi-Hagoromo Station is served by a spur line of the Hanwa Line, and is located 1.7 kilometers from the terminus of the spur at Ōtori.

== Station layout ==
The station consists of one elevated side platform with the station building underneath. The station is staffed.

== Adjacent stations ==
«	Service	»
JR West
Hanwa Line Higashi-Hagoromo Branch (Hagoromo Line)
Ōtori	-	Terminus

== History ==
Higashi-Hagoromo Station opened on July 18, 1929 as the Hanwa-Hamadera Station (和浜寺駅, Hanwa-Asaka eki). It was renamed Yamate-Hagoromo Station (山手羽衣駅, Yamate-Hagoromo eki) on August 1, 1941 and to its present name on May 1, 1944. With the privatization of the Japan National Railways (JNR) on April 1, 1987, the station came under the aegis of the West Japan Railway Company.

== Passenger statistics ==
In fiscal 2019, the station was used by an average of 5281 passengers daily (boarding passengers only).

== Surrounding area ==
The station is connected with Hagoromo Station operated by Nankai Railway.

- Hamadera Park
- Hagoromo University of International Studies
- Hagoromo Gakuen Junior and Senior High School

== See also ==
- List of railway stations in Japan
