= Izumi-Fuchū Station =

Railway station in Izumi, Osaka Prefecture, Japan

Izumi-Fuchū Station 和泉府中駅
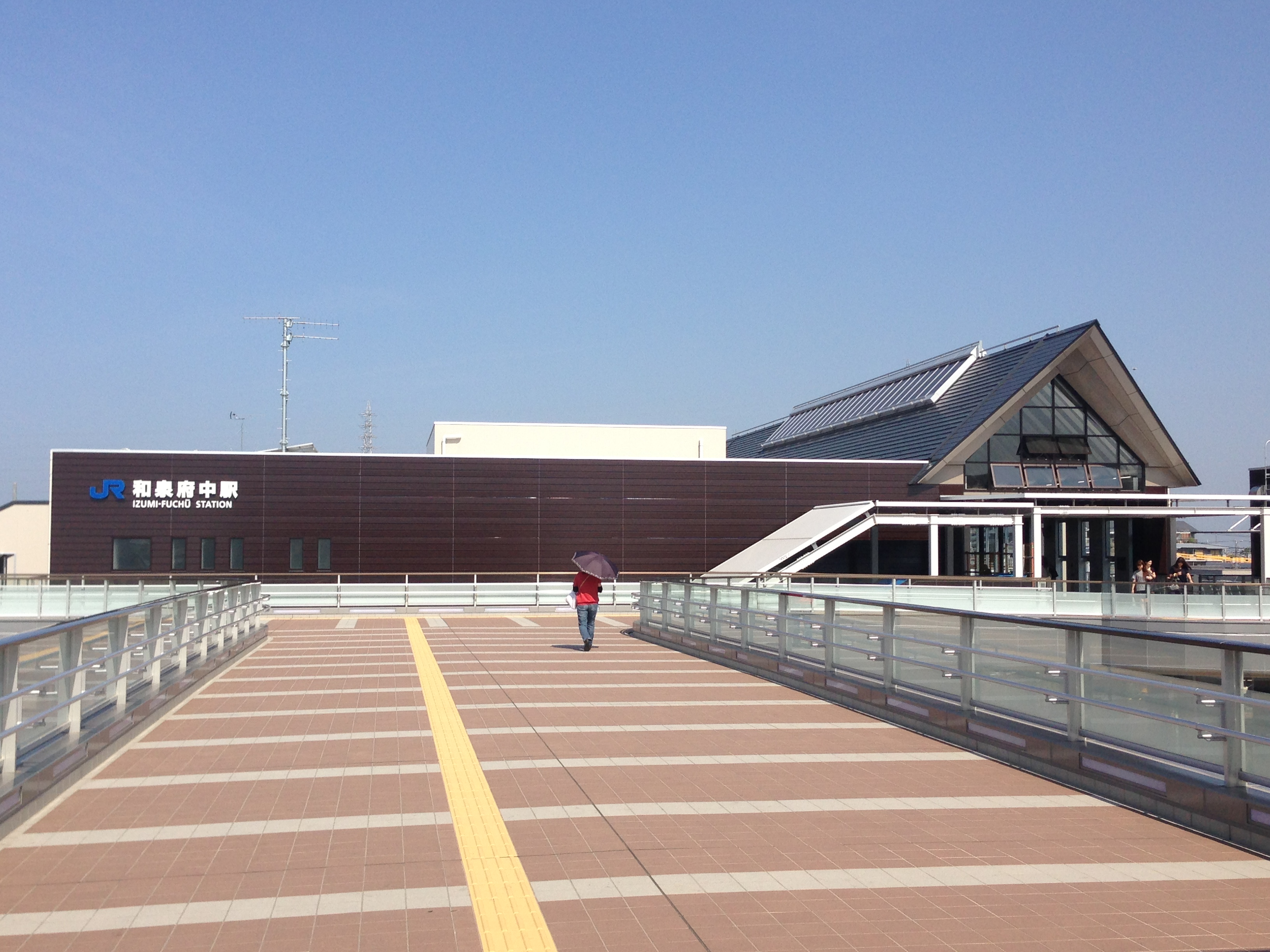
- Izumi-Fuchū Station, August 2013

General information
- Location: 10-1, Fuchucho 1-chōme, Izumi-shi, Osaka-fu 594-0071; Japan
- Coordinates: 34°29′18.55″N 135°25′28.25″E
- Owner: West Japan Railway Company
- Operator: West Japan Railway Company
- Line: R Hanwa Line
- Distance: 20.9 km (13.0 miles) from Tennōji
- Platforms: 2 island platforms
- Connections: Bus stop

Other information
- Status: Staffed (Midori no Madoguchi)
- Station code: JR-R37
- Website: Official website

History
- Opened: 18 July 1929

Passengers
- FY2019: 17,521 daily
Location
- Location within Osaka Prefecture Location within Japan

Izumi-Fuchū Station (和泉府中駅, Izumi-Fuchū-eki) is a passenger railway station in located in the city of Izumi, Osaka Prefecture, Japan, operated by West Japan Railway Company (JR West).

== Lines ==
Izumi-Fuchū Station is served by the Hanwa Line, and is located 20.9 kilometres (13.0 miles) from the northern terminus of the line at Tennōji.

== Station layout ==
The station consists of two island platforms connected by an elevated station building. The station has a Midori no Madoguchi staffed ticket office.

=== Platforms ===
1, 2	■ R Hanwa Line	for Kansai Airport and Wakayama
3, 4	■ R Hanwa Line	for Tennōji

== Adjacent stations ==
«	Service	»
JR West
Hanwa Line
Shinodayama	Local	Kumeda
Shinodayama	Regional Rapid Service	Kumeda
Ōtori	Direct Rapid Service	Higashi-Kishiwada
Ōtori	Rapid Service	Higashi-Kishiwada
Ōtori	Kansai Airport Rapid Service; Kishuji Rapid Service	Higashi-Kishiwada
Tennoji	Limited Express Kuroshio (some trains only)	Hineno
Tennoji	Kansai Airport Limited Express Haruka (some trains only)	Hineno

== History ==
Izumi-Fuchū Station opened on 18 July 1929. With the privatization of the Japan National Railways (JNR) on 1 April 1987, the station came under the aegis of the West Japan Railway Company.

Station numbering was introduced in March 2018 with Izumi-Fuchū being assigned station number JR-R37.

== Passenger statistics ==
In fiscal 2019, the station was used by an average of 17,521 passengers daily (boarding passengers only).

== Surrounding area ==
The east exit is connected via a pedestrian deck to Fuchuru Izumi and the Road-in Izumi shopping street. Near the west exit are Aeon and Izumiya.

Public facilities

- Izumi City Hall
- Izumi Municipal Izumi Library
- Osaka prefecture Izumi Health Center
- Izumi Police Station

Medical facilities

- Izumi City General Medical Center

Accommodation

- Hotel Route-Inn Osaka Izumi-Fuchu

Schools

- Izumi Municipal Kokufu Elementary School
- Izumi Municipal Izumi Junior High School

== See also ==
- List of railway stations in Japan
