= Hanwa Line =

Railway line in Osaka, Japan

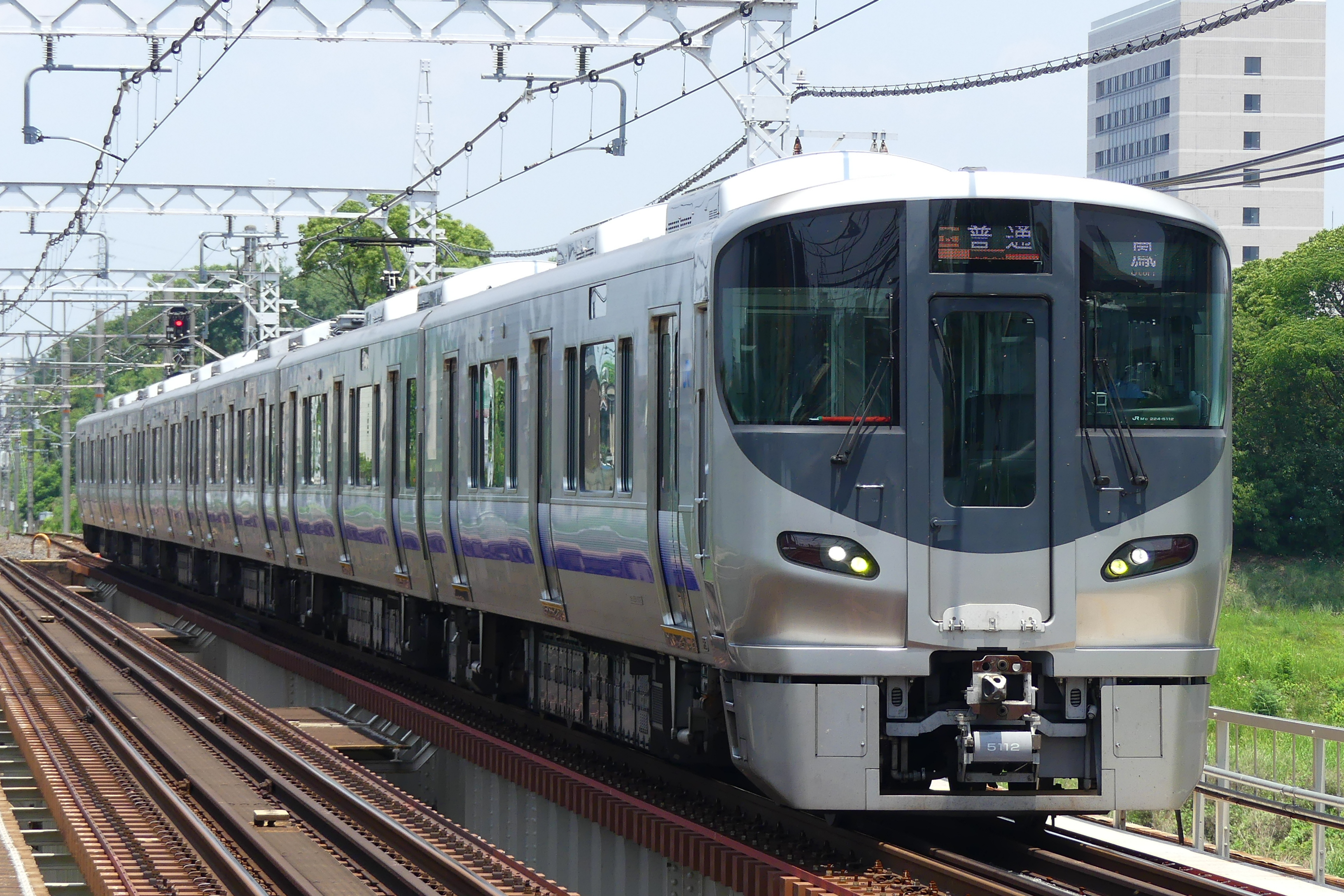
- Local train (225-5100 series EMU)

Overview
- Owner: JR West
- Locale: Osaka Prefecture; Wakayama Prefecture
- Termini: Tennōji, Ōtori; Wakayama, Higashi-Hagoromo
- Stations: 36 (including branch)

Service
- Type: Heavy rail, Commuter rail
- System: Urban Network
- Depot(s): Hineno, Suita

History
- Opened: 18 September 1929; 96 years ago

Technical
- Line length: 61.3 km (38.1 mi) (Tennoji - Wakayama); 1.7 km (1.1 mi) (Otori - Higashi-Hagoromo)
- Number of tracks: Double (Tennōji - Wakayama); Single (Ōtori - Higashi-Hagoromo)
- Track gauge: 1,067 mm (3 ft 6 in)
- Electrification: 1,500 V DC (overhead lines)
- Operating speed: 120 km/h (75 mph)

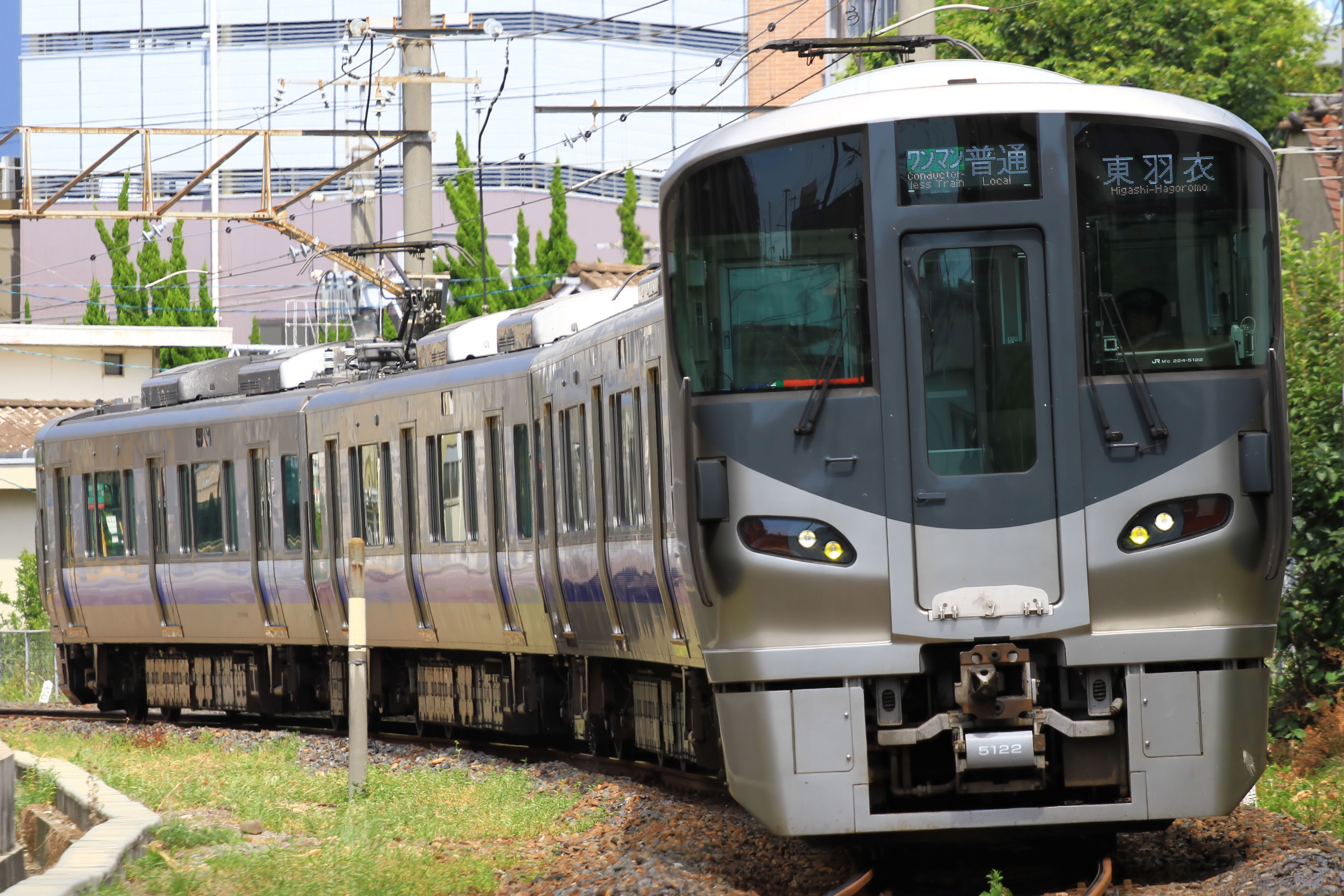
Hagoromo Branch Line 225–5100 series

The Hanwa Line (阪和線, Hanwa-sen) is a commuter rail line in the Osaka-Kobe-Kyoto Metropolitan Area, owned and operated by West Japan Railway Company (JR West). The 61.3 km (38.1 mi) line runs between Osaka and Wakayama, Japan and has a 1.7 km branchline in a southern Osaka suburb. The name is taken from the second syllable of Osaka and the first syllable of Wakayama.

== Services ==
The terminus of the line in Osaka is Tennōji Station in Tennōji-ku where most of the commuter trains on the line originate and terminate. However, many intercity limited express and rapid trains extend to the Osaka Loop Line beyond Tennōji.

The terminus in Wakayama is Wakayama Station. Some trains from Osaka terminate before Wakayama and some spur off to Kansai Airport Station on the Kansai Airport Line from Hineno Station. Tracks are connected to the Kisei Main Line and some trains continue on from there.

The Hagoromo Branch Line (羽衣支線, Hagoromo-shisen), also called the Hagoromo Line (羽衣線, Hagoromo-sen) or the Higashi-Hagoromo Branch Line (東羽衣支線, Higashi-Hagoromo-shisen), between Ōtori Station and Higashi-Hagoromo Station, is officially a part of the Hanwa Line. On the 1.7 km branch, only local shuttle trains operate.

=== Limited express services ===
Hanwa Line segment in bold. Stations in brackets are only served by some services.

- Haruka: Yasu/Kyoto/Shin-Osaka - **Tennoji - (Izumi-Fuchu) - (Hineno)** - Kansai Airport
- Kuroshio: Kyoto/Shin-Osaka - **Tennoji - (Izumi-Fuchu) - Hineno - (Izumi-Sunagawa) - Wakayama** ~ Shirahama/Shingu

=== Commuter services ===
- Local: Tennoji - Wakayama

Trains stop at every station on the line, and they are operated between Tennoji and Otori in the non-rush hour.

- Kishuji Rapid Service: Osaka Loop Line/Tennoji - Wakayama

Trains run on the Osaka Loop Line before entering Hanwa Line at Tennoji with stopping at every station between Tennoji and Fukushima via Tsuruhashi, Kyobashi, and Osaka, then Nishikujo, Bentencho, Taisho and Shin-Imamiya stations (part of trains originate and terminate at Kyobashi). They make rapid service stops throughout the Hanwa Line and stop at every station between Hineno and Wakayama except in the morning and night.

- Kansai Airport Rapid Service: Osaka Loop Line/Tennoji - Hineno - Kansai Airport

Trains usually run in tandem with Kishuji Rapid between the Osaka Loop Line and Hineno before splitting off and making every stop on the Kansai Airport Line. They go loop with stops at every station between Tennoji and Fukushima via Tsuruhashi, Kyobashi, and Osaka, then Nishikujo, Bentencho, Taisho and Shin-Imamiya (part of trains originate and terminate at Kyobashi).

- Direct Rapid Service: Osaka Loop Line ← Tennoji ← Wakayama/Kansai Airport

Trains run on weekday mornings, and make rapid service stops throughout its route and every stop on the Osaka Loop Line.

- Rapid Service: Tennoji - Wakayama

Trains run entirely on the Hanwa Line with extended service to the Kisei Main Line except the non-rush hour.
Stations on the Hanwa Line where trains stop: at Tennōji, Sakaishi, Mikunigaoka, Ōtori, Izumi-Fuchū, Higashi-Kishiwada, Kumatori, Hineno, Izumi-Sunagawa, Kii, Musota and Wakayama

- Regional Rapid Service: Tennoji - Hineno/Wakayama

Trains make rapid service stops from Tennoji to Otori, then local stops to Wakayama. They mainly run between Tennoji and Hineno in the non-rush hour, and also in the morning and as the last train for Hineno.

- B-Rapid Service (Discontinued): Tennoji - Wakayama

Trains ran in early mornings and between the mornings and non-rush hours, with rapid service stops from Tennoji to Kumatori, then local stops to Wakayama.
The first train of the service from Wakayama ran to Shin-Osaka via the Osaka Loop Line and the Umeda Freight Line.

== Stations ==
=== Hanwa Line ===
Legend:

- ● : All trains stop
- ｜: All trains pass
- ○ : Some trains stop
- ↑ : Pass, northbound services only
- ▲: Stop, northbound services only
- ▼: Stop, southbound services only

Local trains stop at all stations.

For limited expresses Haruka and Kuroshio, please see their respective articles.

No.	Station		Regional Rapid	Kansai Airport Rapid	Kishuji Rapid	Rapid	Direct Rapid	Transfers	Location	
Through trains from Kyobashi and Osaka via Osaka Loop Line (see below)
Within Osaka Loop Line:			No through service	Rapid (Passes Imamiya, Ashiharabashi and Noda)			Local			
JR-R20	Tennoji	天王寺	●	●	●	●	▲	Osaka Loop Line, Kansai Main Line (Yamatoji Line); Osaka Metro: Midosuji Line (M23), Tanimachi Line (T27); Kintetsu: F Minami Osaka Line (F01: Osaka Abenobashi Station); Hankai Tramway: Uemachi Line (HN01: Tennoji-ekimae Station)	Tennoji-ku, Osaka	Osaka; Prefecture
JR-R21	Bishōen	美章園	｜	｜	｜	｜	↑		Abeno-ku, Osaka	Osaka; Prefecture
JR-R22	Minami-Tanabe	南田辺	｜	｜	｜	｜	↑		Abeno-ku, Osaka	Osaka; Prefecture
JR-R23	Tsurugaoka	鶴ヶ丘	｜	｜	｜	｜	↑		Abeno-ku, Osaka	Osaka; Prefecture
JR-R24	Nagai	長居	｜	｜	｜	｜	↑	Osaka Metro: Midosuji Line (M26)	Sumiyoshi-ku, Osaka	Osaka; Prefecture
JR-R25	Abikochō	我孫子町	｜	｜	｜	｜	↑		Sumiyoshi-ku, Osaka	Osaka; Prefecture
JR-R26	Sugimotochō	杉本町	｜	｜	｜	｜	↑		Sumiyoshi-ku, Osaka	Osaka; Prefecture
JR-R27	Asaka	浅香	｜	｜	｜	｜	↑		Sakai-ku, Sakai	Osaka; Prefecture
JR-R28	Sakaishi	堺市	●	●	●	●	▲		Sakai-ku, Sakai	Osaka; Prefecture
JR-R29	Mikunigaoka	三国ヶ丘	●	●	●	●	▲	Nankai: Kōya Line (NK57)	Sakai-ku, Sakai	Osaka; Prefecture
JR-R30	Mozu	百舌鳥	｜	｜	｜	｜	↑		Sakai-ku, Sakai	Osaka; Prefecture
JR-R31	Uenoshiba	上野芝	｜	｜	｜	｜	↑		Nishi-ku, Sakai	Osaka; Prefecture
JR-R32	Tsukuno	津久野	｜	｜	｜	｜	↑		Nishi-ku, Sakai	Osaka; Prefecture
JR-R33	Ōtori	鳳	●	●	●	●	▲	Hagoromo Branch Line (see below)	Nishi-ku, Sakai	Osaka; Prefecture
JR-R34	Tonoki	富木	●	｜	｜	｜	↑		Takaishi	Osaka; Prefecture
JR-R35	Kita-Shinoda	北信太	●	｜	｜	｜	↑		Izumi	Osaka; Prefecture
JR-R36	Shinodayama	信太山	●	｜	｜	｜	↑		Izumi	Osaka; Prefecture
JR-R37	Izumi-Fuchū	和泉府中	●	●	●	●	▲		Izumi	Osaka; Prefecture
JR-R38	Kumeda	久米田	●	｜	｜	｜	↑		Kishiwada	Osaka; Prefecture
JR-R39	Shimomatsu	下松	●	｜	｜	｜	↑		Kishiwada	Osaka; Prefecture
JR-R40	Higashi-Kishiwada	東岸和田	●	●	●	●	▲		Kishiwada	Osaka; Prefecture
JR-R41	Higashi-Kaizuka	東貝塚	●	｜	｜	｜	↑		Kaizuka	Osaka; Prefecture
JR-R42	Izumi-Hashimoto	和泉橋本	●	｜	｜	｜	↑		Kaizuka	Osaka; Prefecture
JR-R43	Higashi-Sano	東佐野	●	｜	｜	｜	↑		Izumisano	Osaka; Prefecture
JR-R44	Kumatori	熊取	●	●	●	●	▲		Kumatori	Osaka; Prefecture
JR-R45	Hineno	日根野	●	●	●	●	▲	Kansai Airport Line	Izumisano	Osaka; Prefecture
Haruka, Kansai Airport Rapid & Direct Rapid (Some): Through service to Kansai Airport via Kansai Airport Line
JR-R46	Nagataki	長滝	▼		○	｜	↑		Izumisano	Osaka; Prefecture
JR-R47	Shinge	新家	▼		○	｜	↑		Sennan	Osaka; Prefecture
JR-R48	Izumi-Sunagawa	和泉砂川	▼		●	●	▲		Sennan	Osaka; Prefecture
JR-R49	Izumi-Tottori	和泉鳥取	▼		○	｜	↑		Hannan	Osaka; Prefecture
JR-R50	Yamanakadani	山中渓	▼		○	｜	↑		Hannan	Osaka; Prefecture
JR-R51	Kii	紀伊	▼		●	●	▲		Wakayama	Wakayama Prefecture
JR-R52	Musota	六十谷	▼		●	●	▲		Wakayama	Wakayama Prefecture
JR-R53	Kii-Nakanoshima	紀伊中ノ島	▼		○	｜	↑		Wakayama	Wakayama Prefecture
JR-R54	Wakayama	和歌山	▼		●	●	▲	Kisei Main Line, Wakayama Line; Kishigawa Line	Wakayama	Wakayama Prefecture
Line continues as Kisei Main Line

=== Higashi-Hagoromo Branch Line (Hagoromo Line) ===
Station		Transfers	Location	
Ōtori	鳳	Hanwa Line (see above)	Sakai	Osaka; Prefecture
Higashi-Hagoromo	東羽衣	Nankai: Main Line, Takashinohama Line (NK16: Hagoromo Station)	Takaishi	Osaka; Prefecture

== Rolling stock ==
All trains are based at Hineno and Suita Depots.

=== Commuter ===
- 223-0/2500 series
- 225-5000/5100 series

=== Limited Express ===
- 271 series (Haruka service, from Spring 2020)
- 281 series (Haruka service)
- 283 series (Kuroshio service)
- 287 series (Kuroshio service)
- 289 series (Kuroshio service)

=== Former ===
==== Passenger ====
===== JNR, JR West =====
- 51 series
- 52 series
- 70 series
- 72 series
- 103 series (until 16 March 2018)
- 113 series (until March 2012)
- 117 series
- 123 series
- 165 series
- 205-0 series (until 16 March 2018)
- 205-1000 series (until 16 March 2018)
- 221 series (until March 2012)
- 381 series (until 30 October 2015)
- 485 series
- KiHa 55 series
- KiHa 58 series
- KiHa 65
- KiHa 81 series
- KiHa 82 series

===== Hanwa Electric Railway, Nankai Railway =====
- MoYo 100
- MoTa 300
- KuYo 500
- KuTa 600
- KuTe 700
- KuTa 750
- KuTa 3000
- KuTa 7000

==== Freight ====
===== JNR =====
- ED16
- EF15

===== Hanwa Electric Railway, Nankai Railway =====
- RoKo 1000 (now ED38)
- RoKo 1100
- MoKa 2000
- ED1151 (now Nankai ED5151)

== History ==
The line was opened as a double-track electrified line by the Hanwa Electric Railway in 1929. In 1940, the company was merged with Nankai Railway (predecessor of Nankai Electric Railway) and became the Yamanote Line of Nankai. The Yamanote Line was then nationalized in 1944 and renamed the Hanwa Line.

When Kansai International Airport opened in 1994, the Hanwa Line became one of the main railway links between the city and the airport (along with the Nankai Main Line).

Station numbering was introduced in March 2018 with the Hanwa line being assigned station numbers between JR-R20 and JR-R54.
