= Kuroshio (train) =

Japanese train service

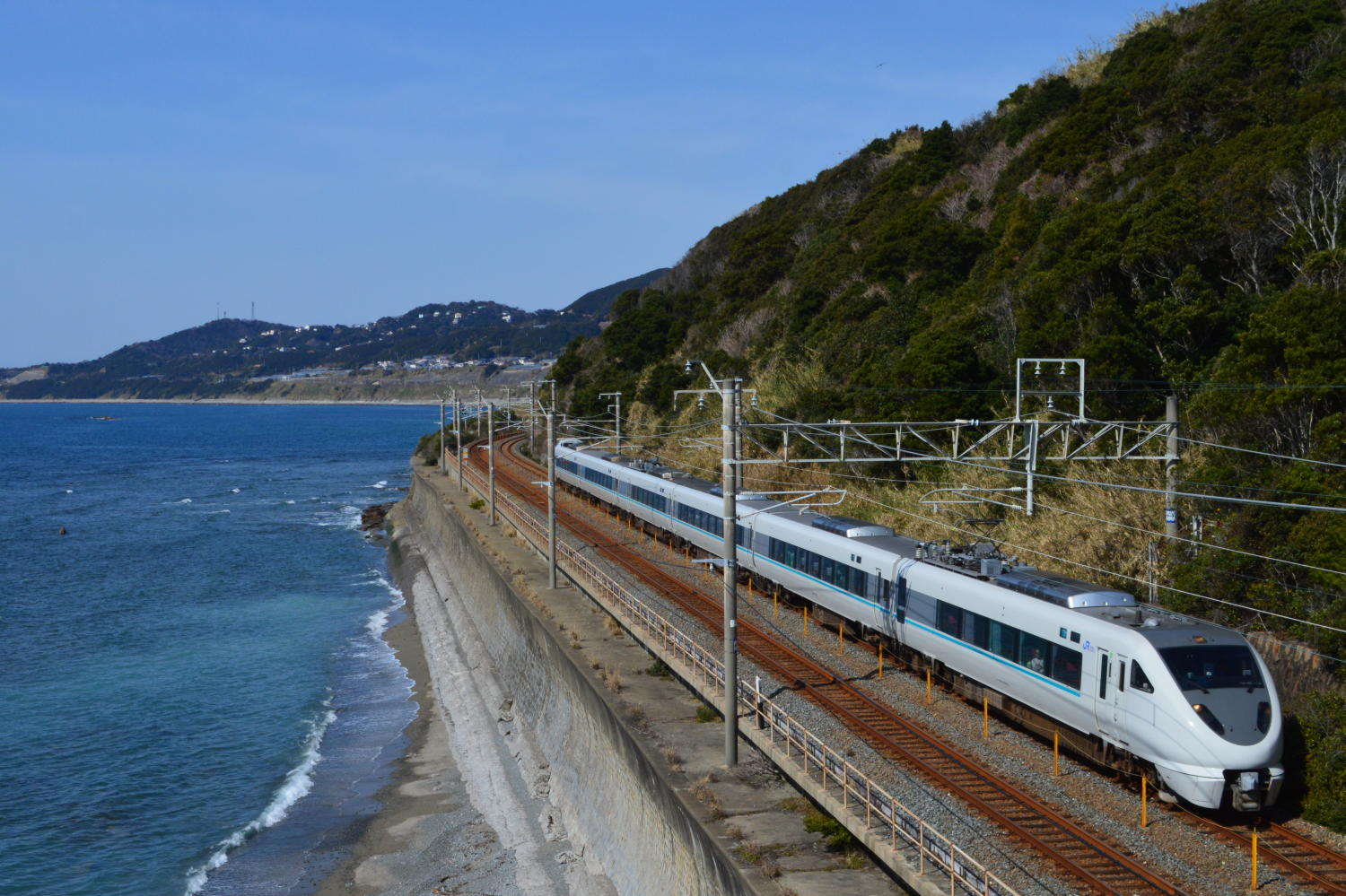
- A 289 series EMU on a Kuroshio service in February 2016

Overview
- Service type: Limited express
- Status: Operational
- First service: 1 March 1965
- Current operator: JR West
- Former operator: JNR

Route
- Termini: Kyoto, Shin-Ōsaka; Wakayama, Kainan, Kii-Tanabe, Shirahama, Shingū
- Stops: 22
- Distance travelled: 315.5 km (196.0 mi) (Kyoto – Shingū)
- Average journey time: 4 hours 15 minutes approx (Shin-Ōsaka – Shingū)
- Service frequency: 16 return workings daily
- Lines used: Tokaido Main Line (JR Kyoto Line), Osaka Loop Line, Hanwa Line, Kisei Line (Kinokuni Line)

On-board services
- Class: Standard + Green
- Disabled access: Yes
- Sleeping arrangements: None
- Catering facilities: None
- Observation facilities: Yes
- Entertainment facilities: None
- Other facilities: Toilets, Woman-only seats

Technical
- Rolling stock: 283 series, 287 series, 289 series
- Track gauge: 1,067 mm (3 ft 6 in)
- Electrification: 1,500 V DC
- Operating speed: 130 km/h (81 mph)
- Track owner: JR West

The Kuroshio (くろしお) is a limited express train service in Japan connecting Kyoto, Shin-Osaka, Tennōji, Wakayama, Kii-Tanabe, Shirahama, and Shingu via the Tokaido Main Line (JR Kyoto Line), Osaka Loop Line, Hanwa Line, and Kisei Line (Kinokuni Line), operated by West Japan Railway Company (JR West). This article also covers the derivative limited express trains, "Super Kuroshio (スーパーくろしお)" and "Ocean Arrow (オーシャンアロー)", the names of which were discontinued from start of the revised timetable on 17 March 2012.

== Stops ==
Trains stop at the following stations:

Kyōto – Shin-Ōsaka – Ōsaka – Tennōji – (Izumi-Fuchu) – Hineno – (Izumi-Sunagawa) – Wakayama – Kainan – (Minoshima) – (Fujinami) – (Yuasa) – Gobō – (Minabe) – Kii-Tanabe – Shirahama – Susami – Kushimoto – Koza – Taiji – Kii-Katsuura – Shingū

- Stations in brackets () are stations where not all trains stop.
- Previously, train services went directly between the Loop Line and Shin-Osaka via the Umeda Freight Line, resulting in no trains going to Osaka Station. This changed on 13 February 2023 when trains started to route through new underground platforms at Osaka Station. The new platforms were opened on 18 March 2023.

== Rolling stock ==
- 283 series EMUs
- 287 series EMUs
- 289 series EMUs (since 31 October 2015)

New 287 series EMUs were introduced on Kuroshio services from start of the revised timetable on 17 March 2012. From the same date, the Super Kuroshio and Ocean Arrow service names were discontinued, with services integrated with Kuroshio services.

New 289 series EMUs converted from former dual-voltage 683 series trainsets were introduced on Kuroshio services from 31 October 2015, replacing the last remaining JNR-era 381 series trains. The 289 series fleet consists of five six-car sets and three three-car sets (39 vehicles in total).

=== Former rolling stock ===
- 381 series EMUs (October 1978 to 30 October 2015)
- KiHa 80 series DMUs (March 1965 to October 1978)
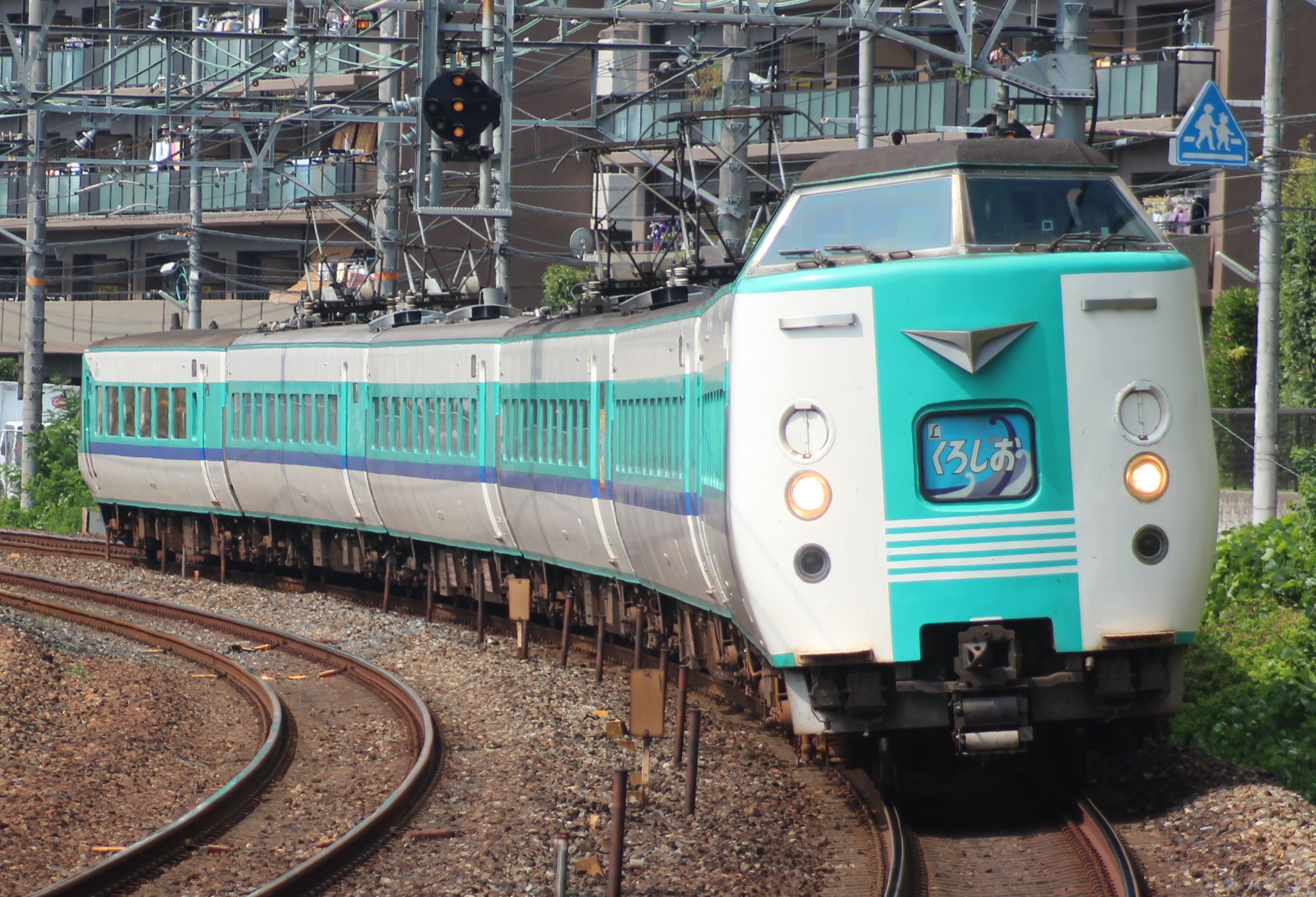
A 381 series EMU on a Kuroshio service in September 2011

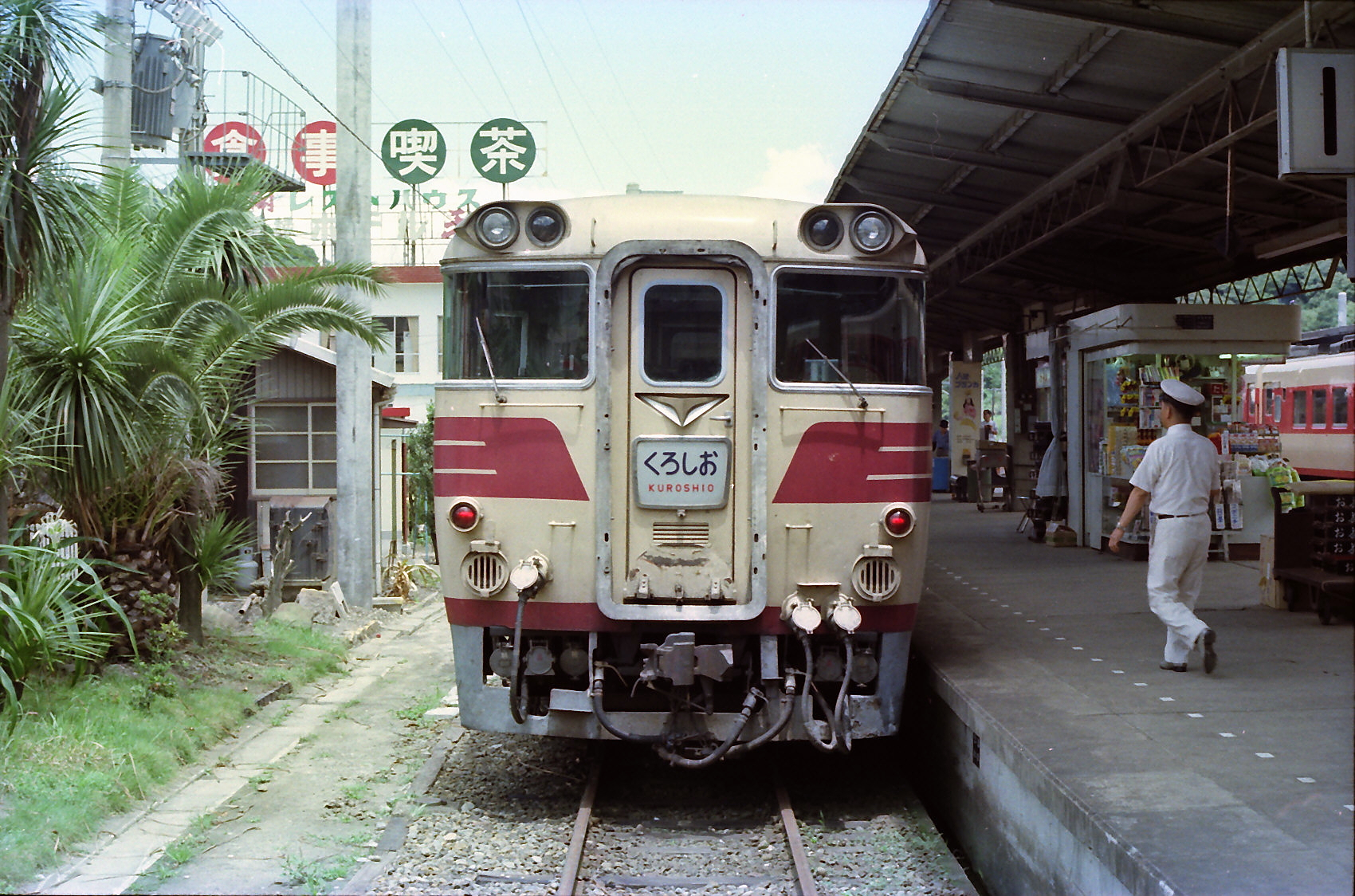
A KiHa 82 on a Kuroshio service stopped at Shirahama in 1976

== Formations ==
- Green: Green car (first class)
- White: Standard car (second class)
- O: Observation car
- G (green car), R (standard car): Reserved seats only
- No smoking available.

Direction
left: Shirahama, Shingū
right: Shin-Osaka, Kyoto

- The services are sometimes operated as 9-car formation between Kyoto and Shirahama.

283 series (Ocean Arrow type)
1	2	3	4	5	6
O, G	R	R	R	R	R

- Women-only seats are available in Car 5.

287/289 series
1		2	3	4	5	6
G	R	R	R	R	R	R

- Women-only seats are available in Car 5.

== See also ==
- List of named passenger trains of Japan
