= Hineno Station =

Railway station in Izumisano, Osaka Prefecture, Japan

Hineno Station 日根野駅
- Hineno Station, May 2026

General information
- Location: 4035 Hineno, Izumisano City, Osaka Prefecture 598-0021; Japan
- Coordinates: 34°23′25″N 135°19′51″E
- Operator: JR West
- Lines: R Hanwa Line; S Kansai Airport Line
- Distance: 34.9 km (21.7 mi) from Tennōji
- Platforms: 2 island platforms
- Tracks: 4

Construction
- Structure type: At grade

Other information
- Status: Staffed (Midori no Madoguchi)
- Station code: JR-R45, JR-S45
- Website: Official website

History
- Opened: 16 June 1930; 96 years ago

Passengers
- FY2019: 8,816 daily

Services
Preceding station	JR West	Following station
Nagataki towards Wakayama	Hanwa Line Local	Kumatori towards Tennoji
Rinkū-town towards Kansai Airport	Kansai Airport Line Local	Terminus
Location
- Location within Osaka Prefecture Location within Kansai region Location within Japan

Hineno Station (日根野駅, Hineno-eki) is a junction passenger railway station located in the city of Izumisano, Osaka Prefecture, Japan, operated by the West Japan Railway Company (JR West)

== Lines ==
Hineno Station is served by the Hanwa Line, and is located 34.9 kilometres (21.7 miles) from the northern terminus of the line at Tennōji. It is also the terminus of the 6.9 km (4.3 mi) Kansai Airport Line.

== Layout ==
This station consists two island platforms with four tracks, connected to the station building by a footbridge. The station has a Midori no Madoguchi staffed ticket office.

=== Platforms ===
1, 2	■ Hanwa Line	for Izumi-Sunagawa and Wakayama returning for Ōtori and Tennōji
1, 2	■ Kansai Airport Line	for Kansai Airport
3	■ Hanwa Line	for Ōtori, Tennōji and Osaka returning for Izumi-Sunagawa and Wakayama
3	■ Kansai Airport Line	returning from Kansai Airport
4	■ Hanwa Line	for Ōtori, Tennōji and Osaka

== Adjacent stations ==
«	Service	»
JR West
Hanwa Line
Kumatori	Local	Nagataki
Kumatori	Regional Rapid Service	Nagataki (Wakayama-bound only)
Kumatori	Kishuji Rapid Service	Nagataki
Kumatori	Kishuji Rapid Service (part of trains in the morning)	Izumi-Sunagawa
Kumatori	Rapid Service	Izumi-Sunagawa
Kumatori	Direct Rapid Service	Izumi-Sunagawa
Izumi-Fuchu or Tennoji	Limited Express Kuroshio	Izumi-Sunagawa or Wakayama
Izumi-Fuchu or Tennoji	Kansai Airport Limited Express Haruka	Kansai Airport
Kansai Airport Line
Terminus	Local (shuttle trains)	Rinkū Town
Kumatori (Hanwa Line)	Kansai Airport Rapid Service	Rinkū Town
Kumatori (Hanwa Line)	Direct Rapid Service	Rinkū Town
Hanwa Line	Kansai Airport Limited Express Haruka	Kansai Airport

== History ==
The station opened on June 16, 1930 as a temporary stop, and upgraded to a full passenger station on March 3, 1931. With the privatization of the Japan National Railways (JNR) on April 1, 1987, the station came under the aegis of the West Japan Railway Company. The Kansai Airport Line began operations on June 15, 1994.

Station numbering was introduced in March 2018 with Hineno being assigned station numbers JR-R45 for the Hanwa Line and JR-S45 for the Kansai Airport Line.

== Passenger statistics ==
In fiscal 2019, the station was used by an average of 8816 passengers daily (boarding passengers only)

== Surrounding area ==
- AEON MALL Hineno
- ABC Housing Izumisano Housing Park
- Osaka University of Tourism
- Osaka Prefectural Hineno High School
- Osaka Prefectural Sano High School

== See also ==
- List of railway stations in Japan
