= Ōtori Station =

Railway station in Sakai, Japan

Ōtori Station 鳳駅
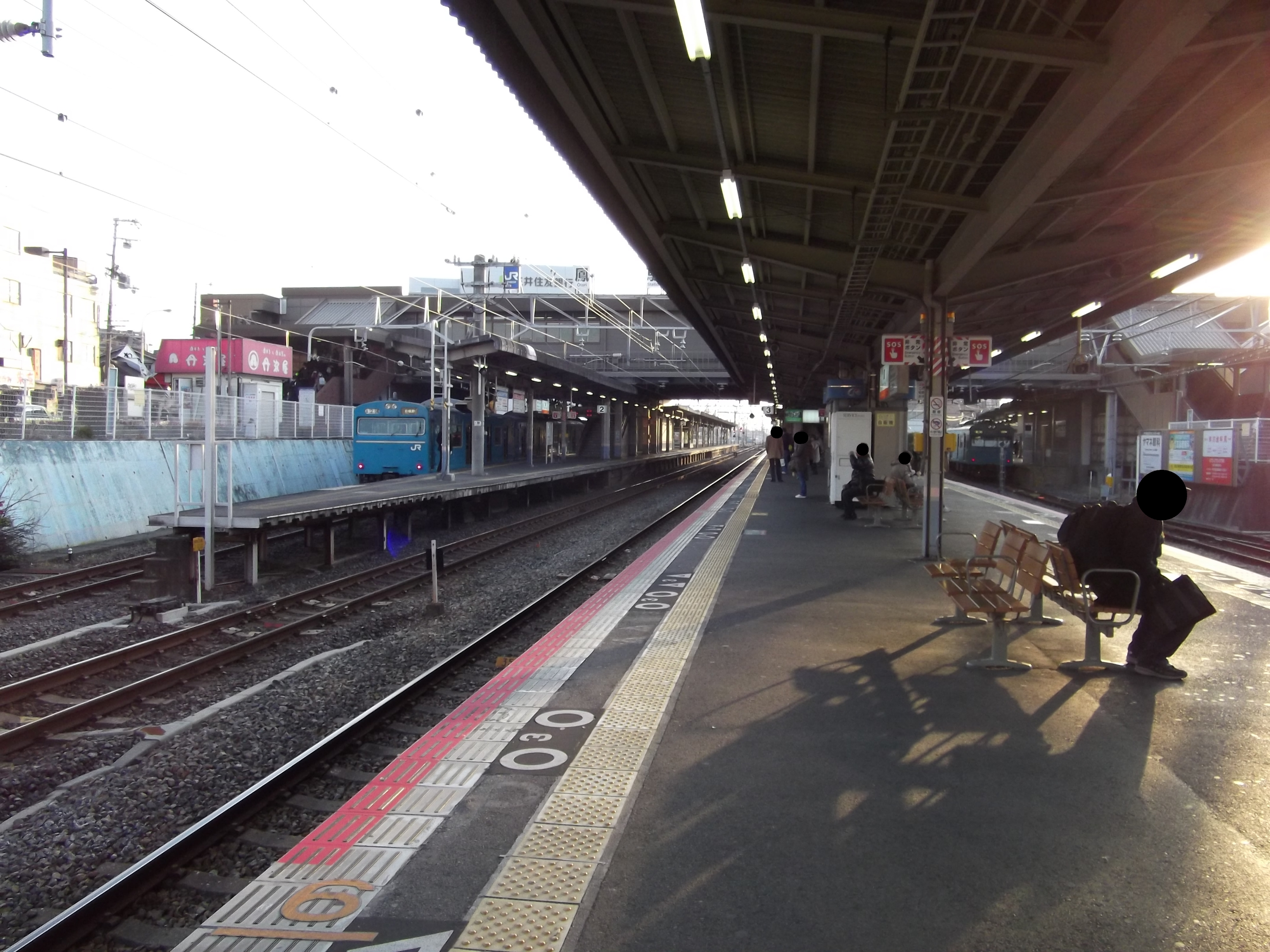
- Ōtori Station platform

General information
- Location: 125, Ōtorihigashi-machi 1-chō, Nishi-ku, Sakai-shi, Osaka-fu 593-8324; Japan
- Coordinates: 34°31′56″N 135°27′32″E
- Owner: West Japan Railway Company
- Operator: West Japan Railway Company
- Lines: R Hanwa Line; ■ Hagoromo Spur Line
- Platforms: 1 side + 2 island platforms
- Connections

Other information
- Status: Staffed (Midori no Madoguchi)
- Station code: JR-R33
- Website: Official website

History
- Opened: 18 July 1929

Passengers
- FY2019: 19,096 daily
Location
- Location within Osaka Prefecture Location within Japan

Ōtori Station (鳳駅, Ōtori-eki) is a passenger railway station located in Nishi-ku, Sakai, Osaka Prefecture, Japan, operated by West Japan Railway Company (JR West).

== Lines ==
Ōtori Station is served by the Hanwa Line, and is located 15.1 kilometers from the northern terminus of the line at Tennōji. It is also the terminus of the Hagoromo Line, a 1.7 kilometer spur line to Higashi-Hagoromo

== Station layout ==
The station consists of one side platform and two island platforms connected by an elevated station building. The station has a Midori no Madoguchi staffed ticket office.

=== Platforms ===
1, 2	■ Hanwa Line	for Kumatori, Wakayama and Kansai Airport
3, 4	■ Hanwa Line	for Tennōji and Osaka
5	■ Hagoromo Line	to Higashi-Hagoromo

== Adjacent stations ==
«	Service	»
JR West
Hanwa Line
Limited Express Kuroshio: Does not stop at this station
Kansai Airport Limited Express Haruka: Does not stop at this station
Tsukuno	Local	Tonoki
Mikunigaoka	Regional Rapid Service	Tonoki
Mikunigaoka	Direct Rapid Service	Izumi-Fuchū
Mikunigaoka	Rapid Service	Izumi-Fuchū
Mikunigaoka	Kansai Airport Rapid Service; Kishuji Rapid Service	Izumi-Fuchū
Hanwa Line Higashi-Hagoromo Branch (Hagoromo Line)
Terminus	-	Higashi-Hagoromo

== History ==
Ōtori Station opened on 18 July 1929. With the privatization of the Japan National Railways (JNR) on 1 April 1987, the station came under the aegis of the West Japan Railway Company.

Station numbering was introduced in March 2018 with Ōtori being assigned station number JR-R33.

== Passenger statistics ==
In fiscal 2019, the station was used by an average of 19,096 passengers daily (boarding passengers only).

== Surrounding area ==
- Sakai City Nishi Ward Office
- Osaka Health and Welfare Junior College (Otori Campus)
- Osaka Prefectural Sakai High School
- Yashima Gakuen High School
- Yamashima Gakuen College of Technology

== See also ==
- List of railway stations in Japan
