= Tennōji Station =

Major railway and metro station in Osaka, Japan

Tennōji Station 天王寺駅
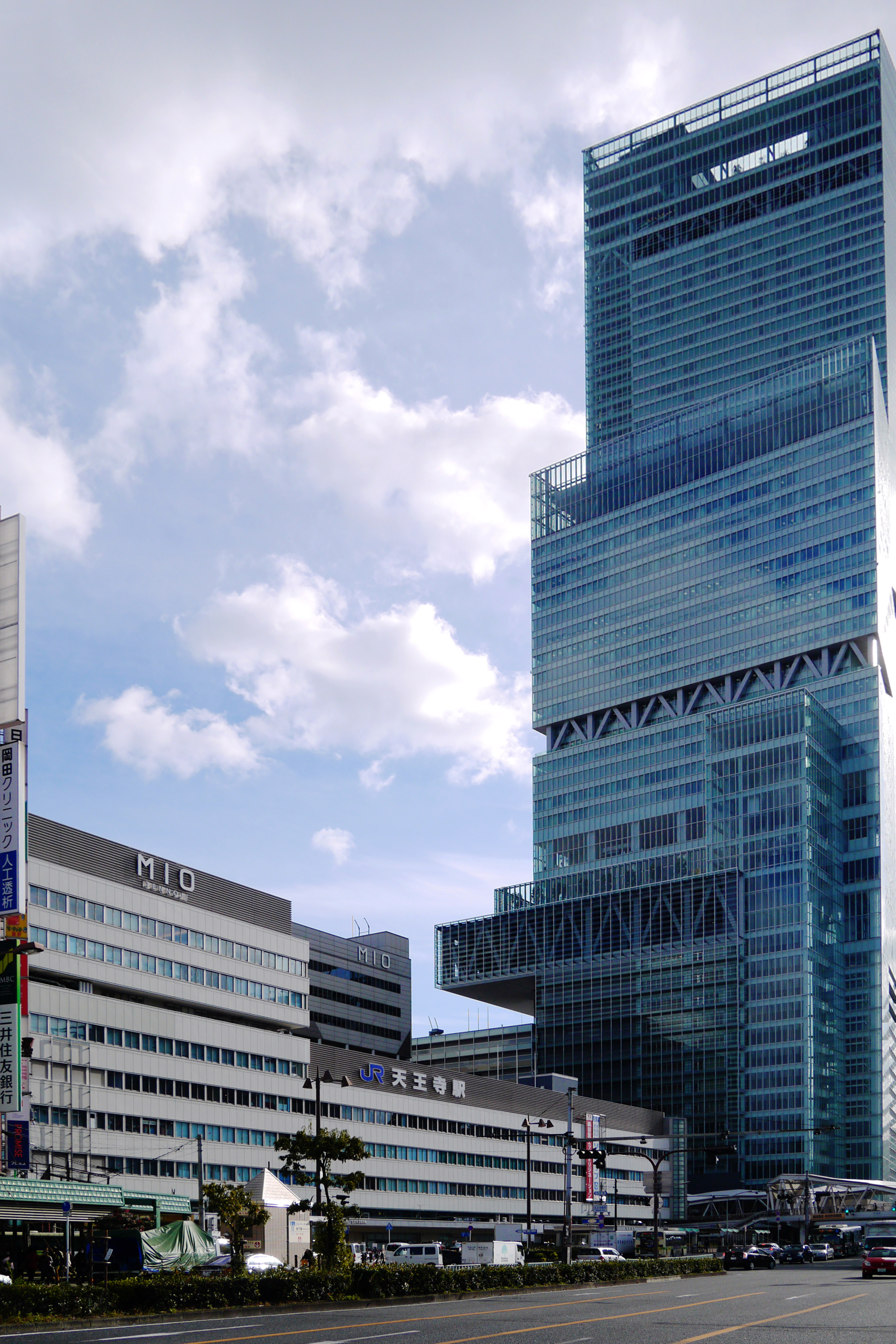
- Tennōji Station

General information
- Location: Tennōji-ku, Abeno-ku, Osaka city, Osaka Prefecture; Japan
- Operator: JR West; Osaka Metro; Hankai Tramway
- Connections: Bus terminal
Location
- Location within Osaka Prefecture Location within Japan

Tennōji Station (天王寺駅, Tennōji-eki) is a major railway station on the JR West Osaka Loop Line, Hanwa Line, Yamatoji Line, Osaka Metro Midōsuji Line, and Tanimachi Line, located in Tennōji-ku and Abeno-ku, Osaka, Japan, and Tennōji-ekimae Station (天王寺駅前駅, Tennōji-eki-mae-eki) is a railway station on the tram Hankai Uemachi Line in Abeno-ku, Osaka, Japan. They are also connected to Ōsaka Abenobashi Station on the Kintetsu Minami Osaka Line. It forms as one of Osaka's main railway terminals to the south for lines operated by West Japan Railway Company (JR West).

== Lines ==
Tennōji Station

- West Japan Railway Company (JR West)
  - Kansai Main Line (Yamatoji Line)
  - Osaka Loop Line
  - Hanwa Line
- Osaka Metro
  - Midōsuji Line (M23)
  - Tanimachi Line (T27)

Tennōji-eki-mae Station

- Hankai Uemachi Line

Connecting station

- Ōsaka Abenobashi Station (F01)
  - Kintetsu Minami Osaka Line

== JR West Tennōji Station ==
Tennōji Station 天王寺駅
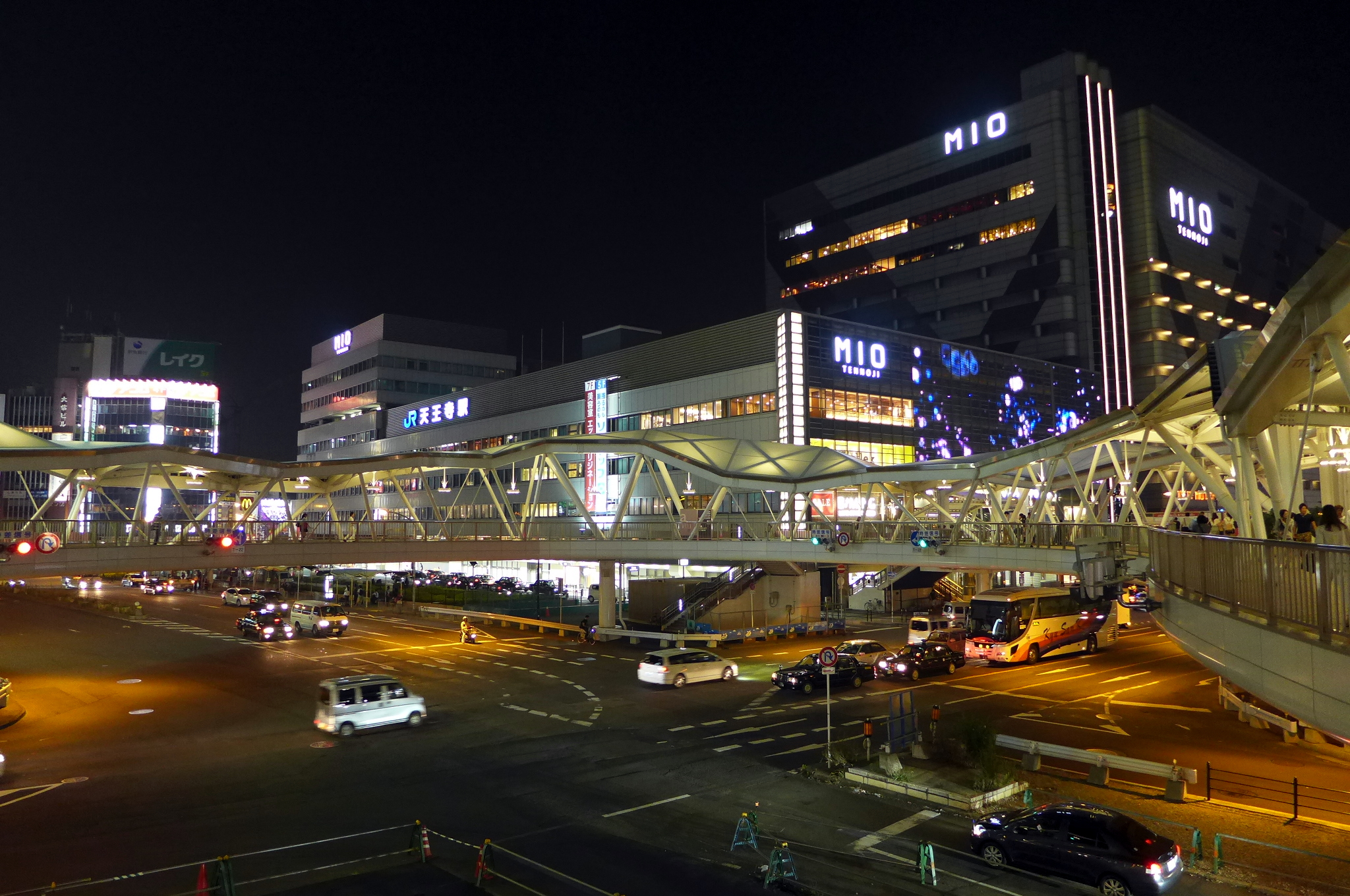

General information
- Location: 10-45, Hiden-inchō, Tennōji Ward, Osaka City, Osaka Prefecture; Japan
- Coordinates: 34°38′50.36″N 135°30′50.18″E
- Operator: JR West
- Lines: Kansai Main Line ( Yamatoji Line); Osaka Loop Line; Hanwa Line
- Platforms: 2 island platforms (Yamatoji Line, Osaka Loop Line), 5 bay platforms (Hanwa Line)

Other information
- Station code: JR-Q20 (Yamatoji Line); JR-O01 (Osaka Loop Line); JR-R20 (Hanwa Line)

History
- Opened: 14 May 1889; 137 years ago
Location
- Location within Japan

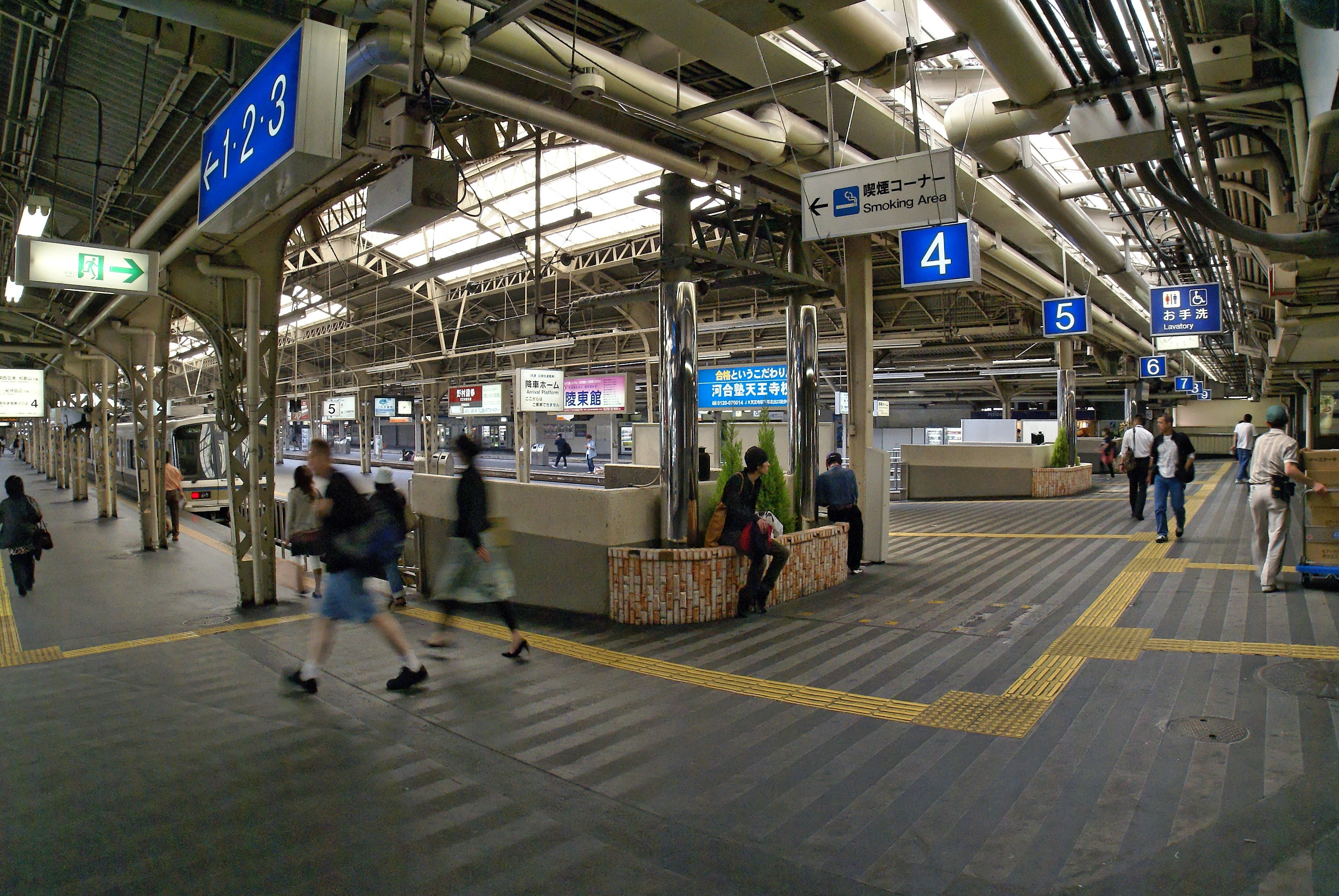
Platforms of Hanwa Line

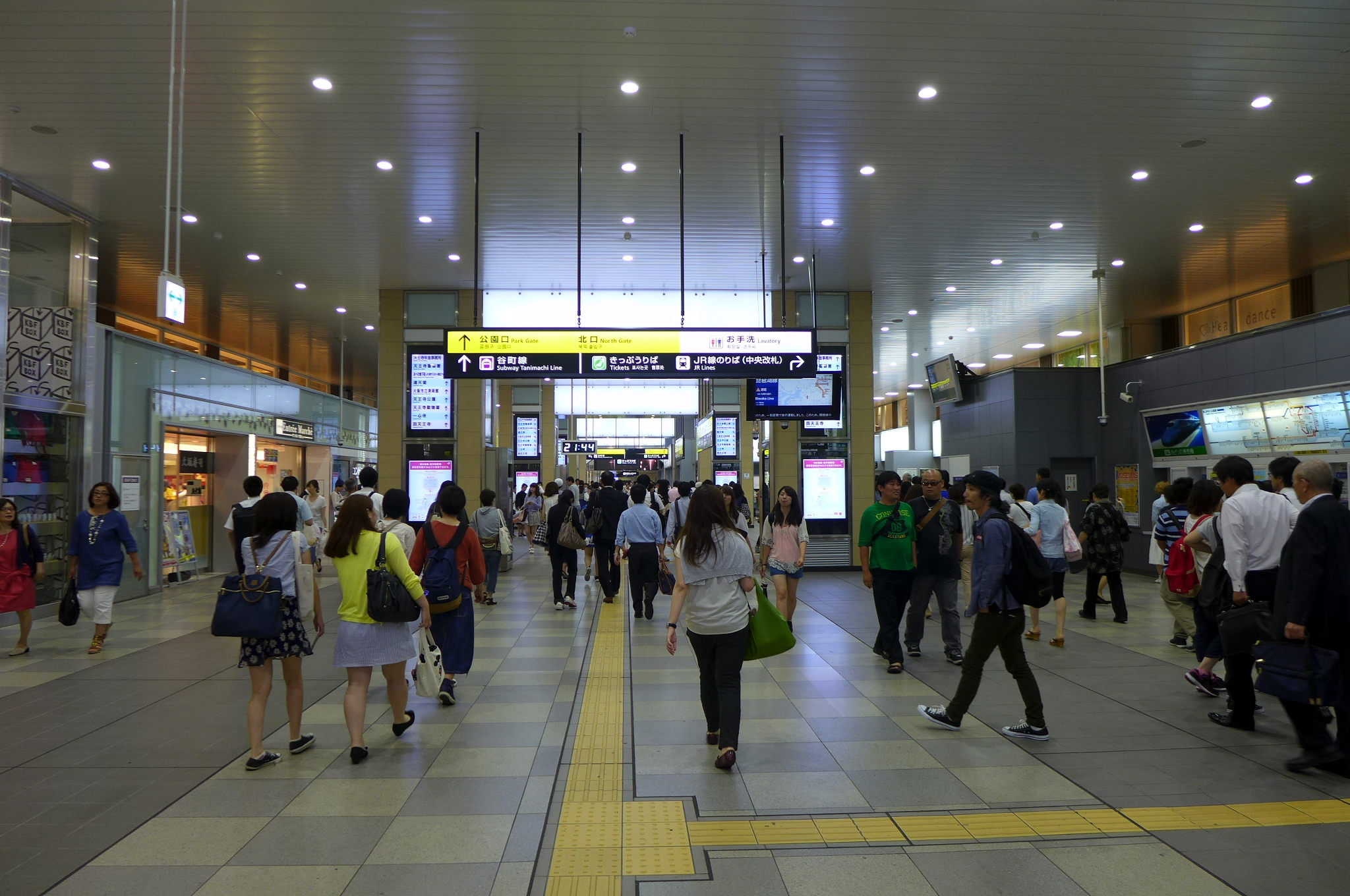
Concourse of JR Tennōji Station after renovation in 2013

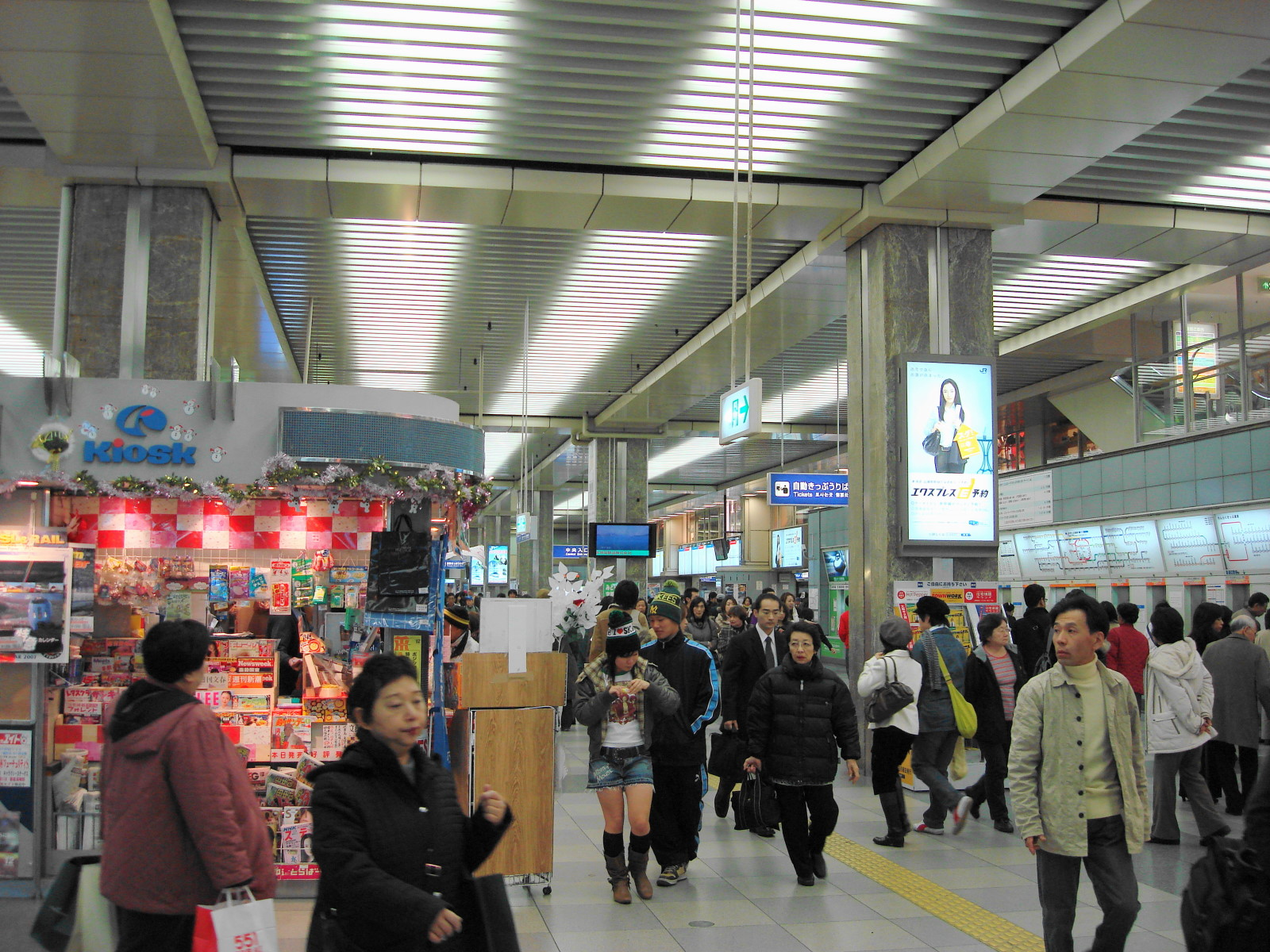
Concourse of JR Tennōji Station before renovation

=== Layout ===
- Hanwa Line - 5 bay platforms serving 5 tracks on the ground.

1	■ Hanwa Line; Kinokuni Line	only for disembarking passengers in the morning Extra limited express train "Kuroshio 81"
2	■ only for disembarking passengers	
3, 4	■ Hanwa Line; Kinokuni Line	rapid services and regional rapid services for Otori, Hineno, Wakayama, Gobo and Kii-Tanabe
3, 4	■ Kansai Airport Line	Kansai Airport rapid services starting for Kansai Airport
5, 6	■ only for disembarking passengers	
7	■ Hanwa Line	local trains and regional rapid services for Otori, Hineno and Wakayama
8	■ Hanwa Line	local trains for Otori, Hineno and Wakayama
9	■ only for disembarking passengers	

- Osaka Loop Line - 2 island platforms serving 3 tracks on the lower level than the Hanwa Line

11, 12	■ Osaka Loop Line	counterclockwise for Tsuruhashi, Kyobashi and Osaka
13	■ only for disembarking passengers	
14	■ Osaka Loop Line	clockwise local trains from Tsuruhashi for Bentencho, Nishikujo and Osaka; Change trains at Nishikujo for Universal City

- Yamatoji Line - 2 island platforms serving 4 tracks on the lower level than the Hanwa Line

15	■ Hanwa Line	from the Osaka Loop Line counterclockwise track for Otori and Wakayama
15	■ Kansai Airport Line	Kansai Airport limited express trains "Haruka" for Kansai Airport; Kansai Airport rapid services for Kansai Airport
15	■ Kinokuni Line	limited express trains "Kuroshio" for Shirahama and Shingu (except "Kuroshio 81"); Kishuji rapid service for Yuasa and Gobo
15	■ Yamatoji Line	for Oji, Nara, Kamo and Takada (only in the morning)
16	■ Yamatoji Line	for Oji, Nara, Kamo and Takada
17	■ Yamatoji Line	for JR Namba
17	■ Osaka Loop Line	clockwise trains from the Yamatoji Line for Bentencho, Nishikujo and Osaka; Change trains at Nishikujo for Universal City
18	■ Yamatoji Line	part of trains for JR Namba
18	■ Osaka Loop Line	clockwise trains from the Yamatoji Line and the Hanwa Line for Bentencho, Nishikujo and Osaka; Change trains at Nishikujo for Universal City
18	■ JR Kyoto Line	limited express trains for Shin-Osaka and Kyoto

Track layout of Tennōji Station and vicinity
	Osaka Loop Line to Kyōbashi
Kansai Main Line (Yamatoji Line) to JR Namba
Osaka Loop Line to Nishikujō		Kansai Main Line (Yamatoji Line) to Nara
	Hanwa Line to Wakayama

=== Train services in off-peak hours ===
Yamatoji Line
eastbound trains

4 Yamatoji rapid services from the Osaka Loop Line to Nara (every 15 minutes), of which 2 continue to Kamo (every 30 minutes)
4 local trains from JR Namba to Oji (every 15 minutes)

westbound trains

4 local trains to JR Namba (every 15 minutes)

Osaka Loop Line
counterclockwise trains

12 trains to Osaka via Kyobashi (every 5 minutes)

clockwise trains

4 Yamatoji rapid services to Osaka via Nishikujo (every 15 minutes)
4 Airport/Kishuji rapid services to Osaka via Nishikujo (every 15 minutes)
4 local trains to Osaka via Nishikujo (every 15 minutes)

Hanwa Line
southbound trains

4 Airport rapid services to Kansai Airport, coupling with Kishuji rapid services until Hineno
4 Kishuji rapid services to Wakayama, coupling with Airport rapid services until Hineno
4 regional rapid services to Hineno
4 local trains to Otori

=== Adjacent stations ===
«	Service	»
Yamatoji Line
Shin-Imamiya	Local	Tōbu-shijō-mae
Shin-Imamiya	Regional Rapid	Kyūhōji
Shin-Imamiya	Rapid	Kyūhōji
Shin-Imamiya	Yamatoji Rapid	Kyūhōji
Osaka Loop Line
Shin-Imamiya	Local	Teradacho
Osaka	Limited Express Kuroshio	Hanwa Line
Osaka	Kansai Airport Limited Express Haruka	Hanwa Line
Hanwa Line
Terminus	Local	Bishōen
Terminus	Regional Rapid	Sakaishi
Shin-Imamiya (Yamatoji Line)	Direct Rapid (Northbound only)	Sakaishi
Shin-Imamiya (Yamatoji Line)	Rapid	Sakaishi
Shin-Imamiya (Yamatoji Line)	Kansai Airport Rapid; Kishuji Rapid	Sakaishi
Osaka Loop Line	Limited Express Kuroshio	Izumi-Fuchu (some trains only); Hineno
Osaka Loop Line	Kansai Airport Limited Express Haruka	Izumi-Fuchu (some trains only); Kansai Airport
Shin-Osaka (JR-A46)	West Express Ginga	Wakayama (JR-R54)

=== History ===
Station numbering was introduced to the JR West facilities March 2018 with the Yamatoji Line being assigned station number JR-Q20, the Osaka Loop line being assigned station number JR-O01, and the Hanwa Line being assigned station number JR-R20.

== Osaka Metro station ==
Tennoji Station 天王寺駅
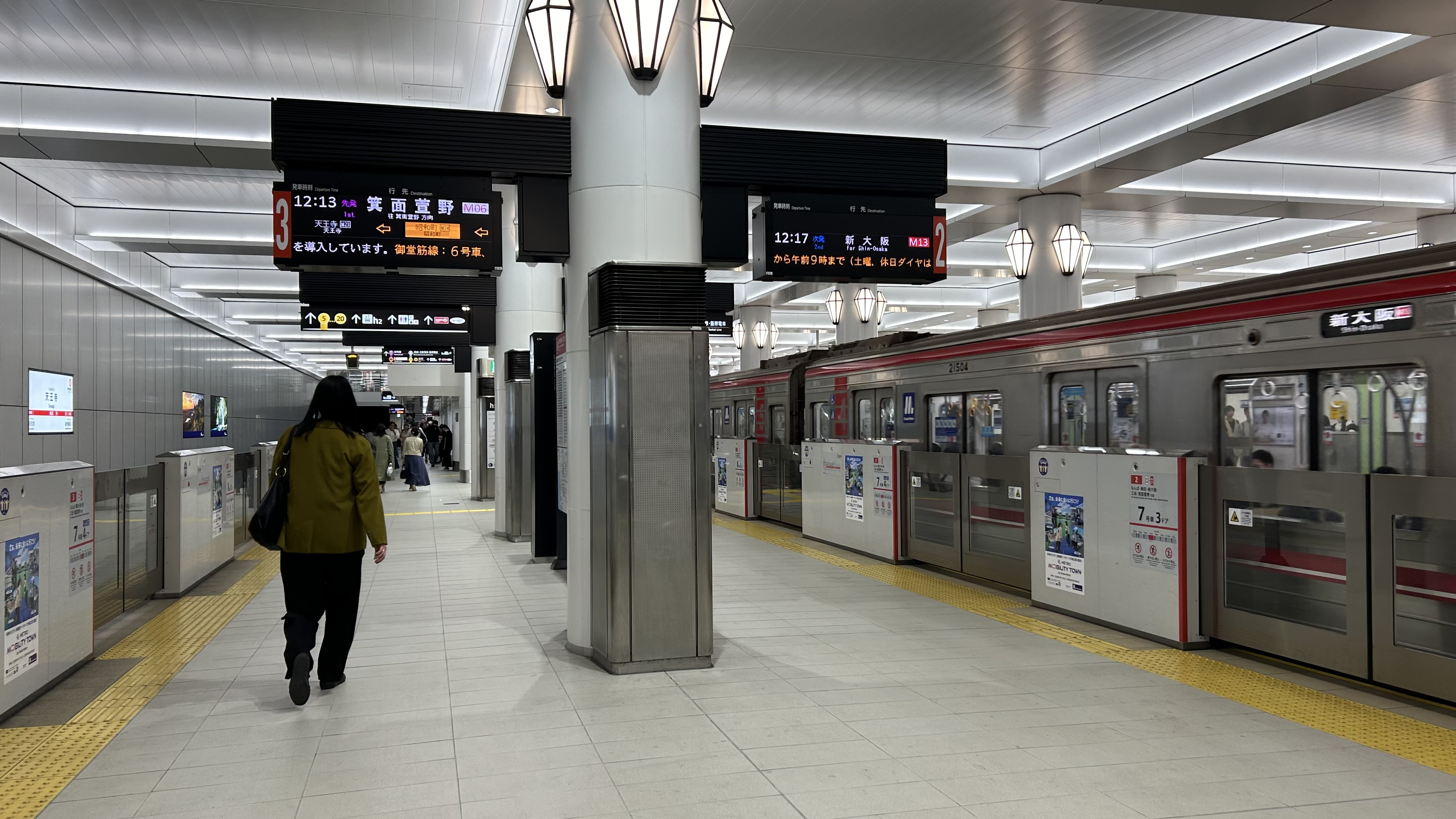
- Midōsuji Line platforms

General information
- Location: 1-48, Abenosuji Itchōme, Abeno-ku (Midosuji Line); 5-52, Chausuyamachō, Tennōji-ku (Tanimachi Line); Osaka, Osaka; Japan
- Coordinates: 34°38′47.59″N 135°30′49.54″E (Midosuji Line); 34°38′50.87″N 135°30′47.4″E (Tanimachi Line)
- System: Osaka Metro
- Operator: Osaka Metro
- Lines: Midōsuji Line; Tanimachi Line
- Platforms: 1 side platform, 1 island platform (Midosuji Line); 2 side platforms (Tanimachi Line)
- Tracks: 5

Construction
- Structure type: Underground

Other information
- Station code: M 23 T 27
- Website: Official website

History
- Opened: 1938 (Midōsuji Line); 1968 (Tanimachi Line)

Passengers
- FY2016: 256,959 daily

Services
Preceding station	Osaka Metro	Following station
Dōbutsuen-mae M 22 towards Esaka	Midōsuji Line	Shōwachō M 24 towards Nakamozu
Shitennōji-mae Yūhigaoka T 26 towards Dainichi	Tanimachi Line	Abeno T 28 towards Yaominami
Location

Osaka Metro Tennōji Station is an interchange serving the Midōsuji and Tanimachi lines. The platforms are not adjacent to each other, but are connected by a long passageway within the ticket gates.

=== Layout ===
Midosuji Line

- The station has a side platform and an island platform serving three tracks on the second basement. They have automatic platform gates.

1	■ Midosuji Line	for Abiko and Nakamozu (including trains terminating at Tennōji)
2	■ Midosuji Line	Starting Tennoji for Namba, Umeda, Nakatsu and Shin-Osaka
3	■ Midosuji Line	from Nakamozu, Shinkanaoka and Abiko for Namba, Umeda, Shin-Osaka and Minoh-kayano

Tanimachi Line

- The station has two side platforms with two tracks on the third basement, under the ticket gates and concourse under the underground city "Avetika".

1	■ Tanimachi Line	for Yaominami
2	■ Tanimachi Line	for Higashi-Umeda, Miyakojima and Dainichi

=== Train services in off-peak hours ===
Midosuji Line (weekdays)
northbound trains

6 or 7 trains from Nakamozu to Minoh-kayano (every 8 minutes)
6 or 7 trains starting from Tennoji to Shin-Osaka (every 8 minutes)

southbound trains

6 or 7 trains to Nakamozu (every 8 minutes)

Midosuji Line (weekends and holidays)
northbound trains

8 trains from Nakamozu to Minoh-kayano (every 7.5 minutes)
8 trains starting from Tennoji to Shin-Osaka (every 7.5 minutes)

southbound trains

8 trains to Nakamozu (every 7.5 minutes)

Tanimachi Line
northbound trains

10 trains to Dainichi (every 6 minutes)

southbound trains

10 trains to Yao-minami (every 6 minutes)

== Hankai Tramway Tennoji-ekimae Station ==
Tennōji-ekimae Station 天王寺駅前駅
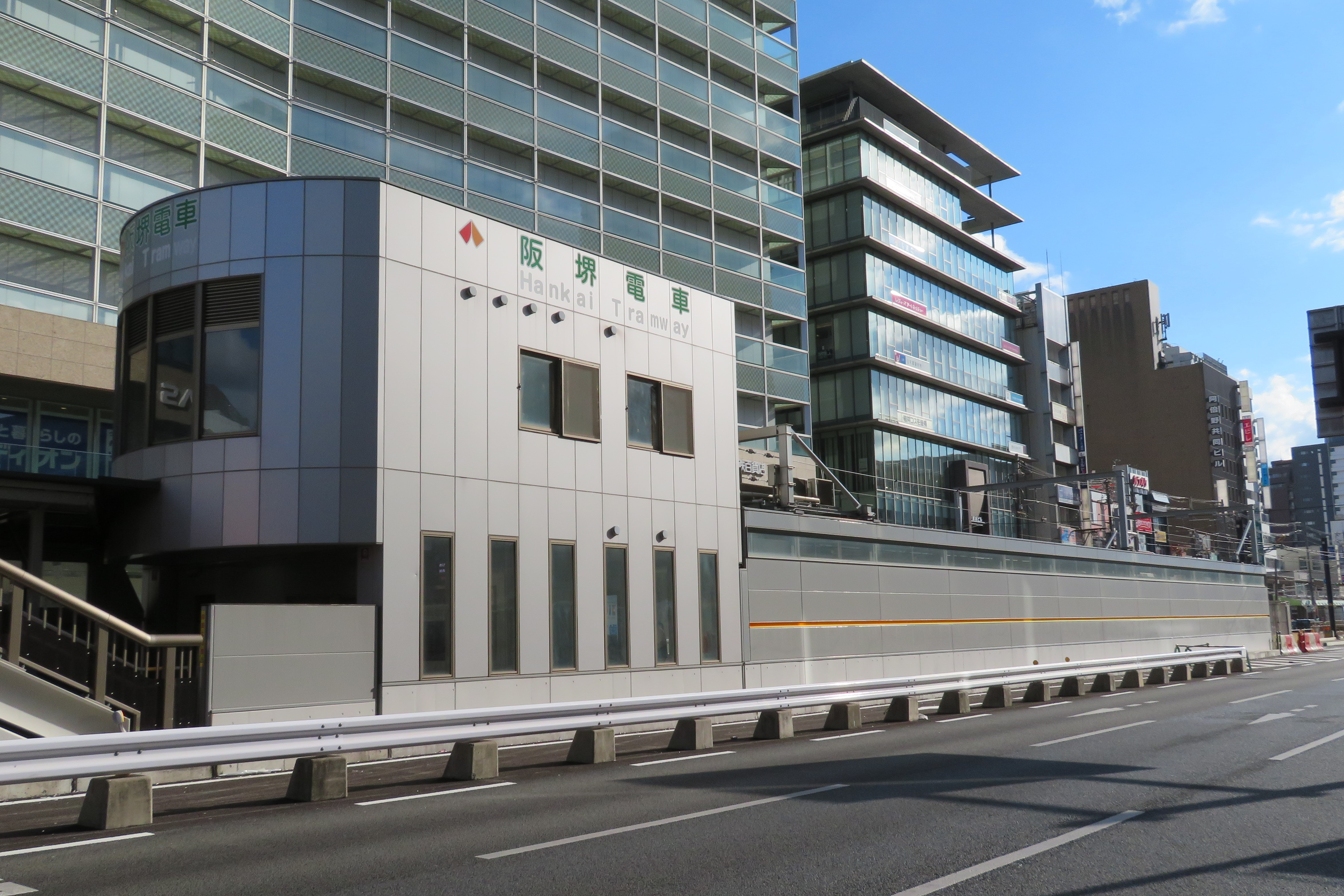
- Station building

General information
- Location: Abenosuji Itchōme, Abeno-ku, Osaka, Osaka Prefecture; Japan
- Coordinates: 34°38′46.74″N 135°30′46.56″E
- System: Hankai Tramway
- Operator: Hankai Tramway
- Line: Uemachi Line

Other information
- Station code: HN01

History
- Opened: 1900
Location

=== Layout ===
2 dead-end platforms serving a track are located on Abenosuji Avenue. After widening the avenue and relocated westward on December 3, 2016, the tram stop is connected from JR West Tennoji Station and Kintetsu Railway Osaka Abenobashi Station via Abeno Pedestrian Bridge and from Osaka Metro Tennoji Station via the underground passage. After the relocation, an elevator became in use to enable wheelchairs and baby buggies to access to the Uemachi Line.

■ Uemachi Line	for Sumiyoshi-Toriimae, Abikomichi and Hamadera-ekimae

=== Tram services in off-peak hours ===
10 trams to Abikomichi via Sumiyoshi-Toriimae, of which 5 continues to Hamadera-ekimae (every 6 minutes)

=== Adjacent stations ===
«	Service	»
Hankai Tramway (HN01)
Uemachi Line
Terminus	-	Abeno (HN02)

== Surrounding area ==
Since so many train lines meet in one location, Tennōji has become a large transfer station. As a result, the area around the station has become quite built up with may buildings as high as 10 or 12 stories high.

- Tennōji Park
  - Tennōji Zoo
  - Osaka Municipal Museum of Art
- Tennoji MiO (shopping mall)
  - Main Building
  - Plaza Annex
- Abeno Harukas
  - Kintetsu Department Store Main Store Abeno Harukas
  - Harukas 300
  - Abeno Harukas Art Museum
  - Osaka Mariott Miyako Hotel
- Tennōji Miyako Hotel
- Hoop
- and
- Avetika (underground city)
- Abeno Cues Town (shopping mall)
- Shitennō-ji
- Isshin-ji
- Osaka City University Hospital

=== Buses ===
Transit bus
Osaka City Bus Corporation (Abenobashi, Abenobashi-nishi)
Kintetsu Bus Co., Ltd. (Abenobashi, Abenobashi-higashiguchi)
Expressway bus
Kintetsu Bus Co., Ltd. (Abenobashi Bus Station)
West JR Bus Company, JR Bus Kanto Co., Ltd., Osaka Bus Co., Ltd. (Tennoji Station, the east side of Tennoji Park)
Airport limousine
Osaka Airport Transport Co., Ltd. (the north side of Apollo Building)
Kintetsu Bus Co., Ltd., Kansai Airport Transportation Enterprise Co., Ltd. (the north side of Osaka Abenobashi Station)

For details, see Osaka Abenobashi Station#Bus stops

== See also ==
- List of railway stations in Japan
