= Izumi-Tottori Station =

Railway station in Hannan, Osaka Prefecture, Japan

Izumi-Tottori Station 和泉鳥取駅
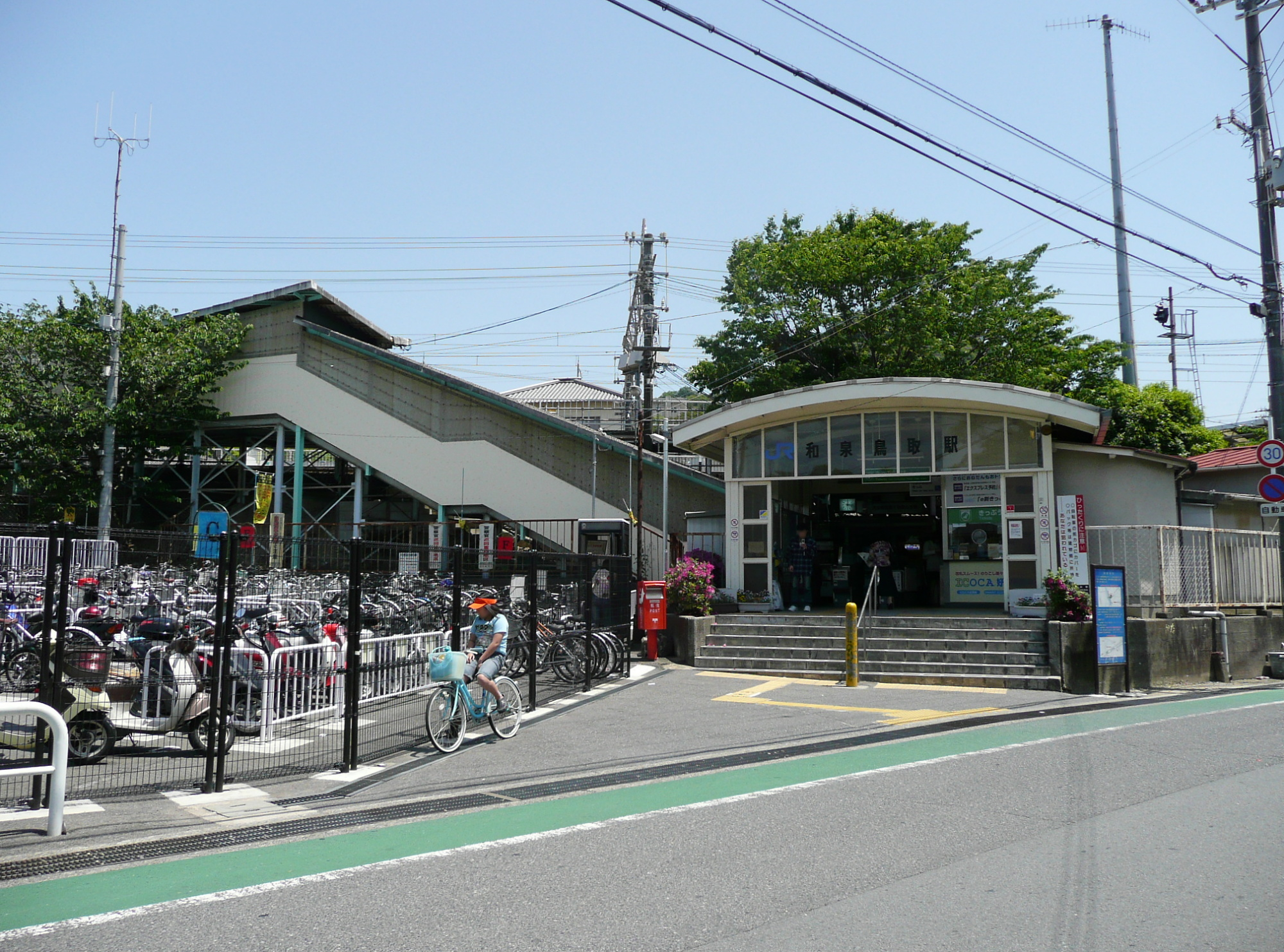
- Izumi-Tottori Station west exit, May 2008

General information
- Location: 1069 Izumitottori, Hannan-shi, Osaka-fu 599-0213; Japan
- Coordinates: 34.3428°N 135.2631°E
- System: JR-West commuter rail station
- Owner: West Japan Railway Company
- Operator: West Japan Railway Company
- Line: R Hanwa Line
- Distance: 43.3 km (26.9 miles) from Tennōji
- Platforms: 2 side platforms
- Tracks: 2
- Train operators: West Japan Railway Company

Other information
- Status: Unstaffed
- Station code: JR-R49
- Website: Official website

History
- Opened: 1 April 1963

Passengers
- FY2019: 2209 daily
Services
Preceding station	JR-West	Following station
Hanwa Line
Izumi-Sunagawa	Local	Yamanakadani
Izumi-Sunagawa	Regional Rapid Service (southbound only)	Yamanakadani
Izumi-Sunagawa	Kishuji Rapid Service (except part of trains in the morning)	Yamanakadani
Rapid Service: Does not stop at this station
Direct Rapid Service: Does not stop at this station
Limited Express Kuroshio: Does not stop at this station
Location
- Location within Osaka Prefecture Location within Japan

Izumi-Tottori Station (和泉鳥取駅, Izumi-Tottori-eki) is a passenger railway station located in the city of Hannan, Osaka Prefecture, Japan, operated by West Japan Railway Company (JR West). Located near Asahiyama and the border with Sennan, Izumi-Tottori is on the JR Hanwa line. The Hanwa line serves the mountainous inland areas of municipalities and suburban areas between Wakayama city and Osaka city proper.

== Lines ==
Izumi-Tottori Station is served by the Hanwa Line, and is located 43.3 kilometers from the northern terminus of the line at Tennōji.

== Station layout ==
The station consists of two side platforms built in an embankment, with the station building underneath. The station is staffed.

=== Platforms ===
1	■ Hanwa Line	for Kii and Wakayama
2	■ Hanwa Line	for Hineno and Tennoji; Change trains at Hineno for Kansai Airport

== History ==
Izumi-Tottori Station opened on 1 April 1963. With the privatization of the Japan National Railways (JNR) on 1 April 1987, the station came under the aegis of the West Japan Railway Company.

Station numbering was introduced in March 2018 with Izumi-Tottori being assigned station number JR-R49.

== Passenger statistics ==
In fiscal 2019, the station was used by an average of 2156 passengers daily (boarding passengers only).

== Surrounding Area ==
- Tamadayama Park
- Osaka Prefectural Izumi Tottori High School
- Hannan City Tottori Higashi Junior High School

== See also ==
- List of railway stations in Japan
