= Hakotsukuri Station =

Railway station in Hannan, Osaka Prefecture, Japan

Hakotsukuri Station 箱作駅
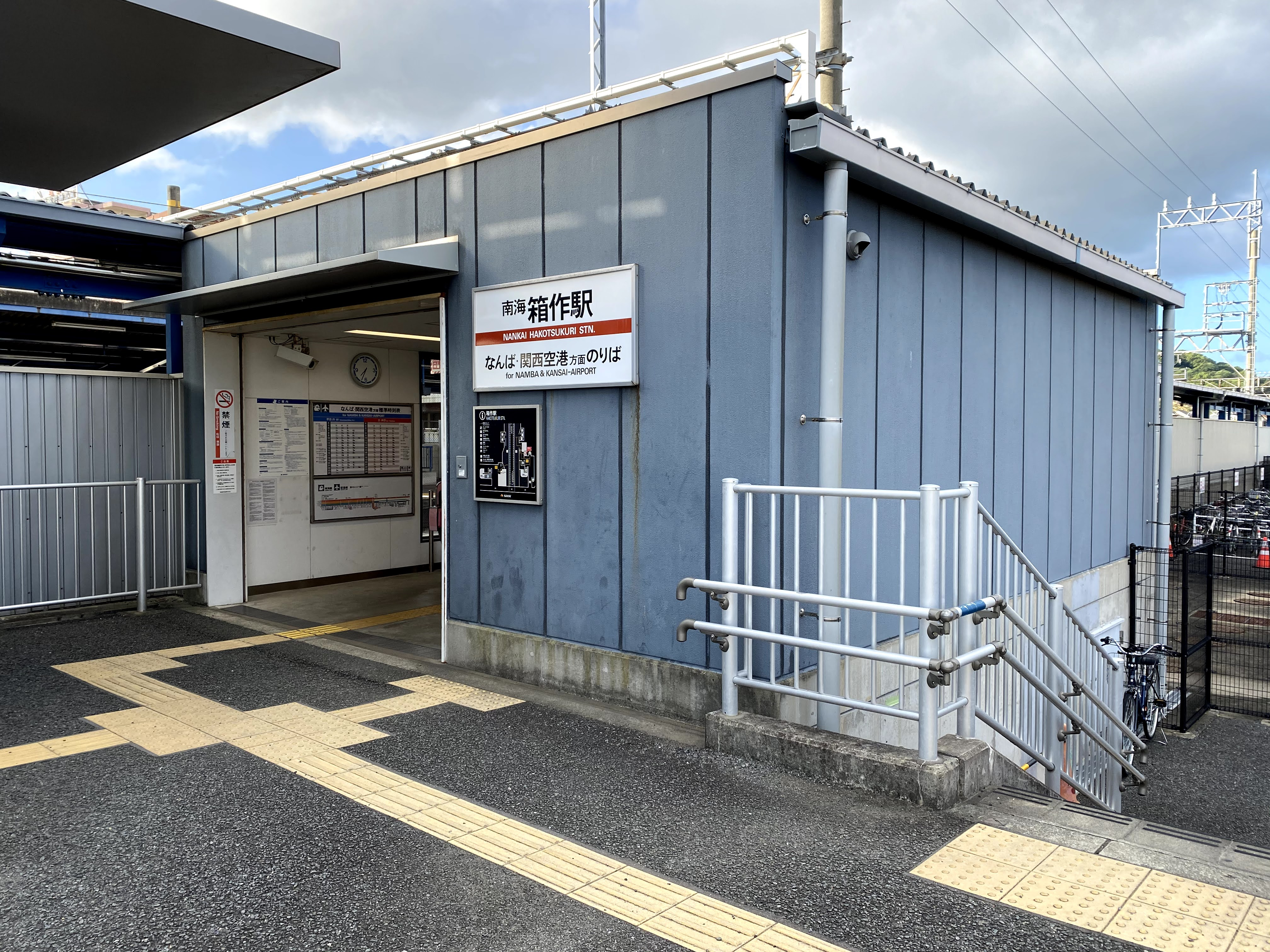
- Hakotsukuri Station entrance for Namba and Kansai Airport in September 2020

General information
- Location: 320, Hakotsukuri, Hannan-shi, Osaka-fu 599-0232; Japan
- Coordinates: 34°20′29″N 135°12′47″E
- Operator: Nankai Electric Railway
- Line: Nankai Main Line
- Distance: 46.6 km from Namba
- Platforms: 2 side platforms
- Connections: Bus stop

Other information
- Station code: NK39
- Website: Official website

History
- Opened: 22 October 1898; 127 years ago

Passengers
- 2019: 2466 daily

Services
| Preceding station | Nankai Electric Railway | Following station |
|---|---|---|
| Tottorinoshō towards Namba | Nankai Main Line Local Sub. Express | Tannowa towards Wakayamashi |
Location
- Location within Osaka Prefecture Location within Japan

Hakotsukuri Station (箱作駅, Hakotsukuri-eki) is a passenger railway station located in the city of Hannan, Osaka Prefecture, Japan, operated by the private railway operator Nankai Electric Railway. It has the station number "NK39".

== Lines ==
Hakotsukuri Station is served by the Nankai Main Line, and is 46.6 kilometers (29.0 mi) from the terminus of the line at Namba.

== Layout ==
The station has two opposed side platforms serving two tracks. Separate station buildings are located for each platform, and it is not possible to change platforms within the station.

=== Platforms ===
| 1 | ■ Nankai Line | for Wakayamashi |
| 2 | ■ Nankai Line | for Namba and Kansai Airport |

== History ==
Hakotsukuri Station opened on 22 October 1898.

== Passenger statistics ==
In fiscal 2019, the station was used by an average of 2466 passengers daily.

== Surrounding area ==
- Hakotsukuri Beach (Pichi Pichi Beach)
- Hannan Municipal Shimoso Elementary School
- Sennan Satoumi Park

== See also ==
- List of railway stations in Japan
