= Sairyō Kofun =

Kofun period keyhole-shaped burial mound in Japan

- 西陵古墳 (Japanese)
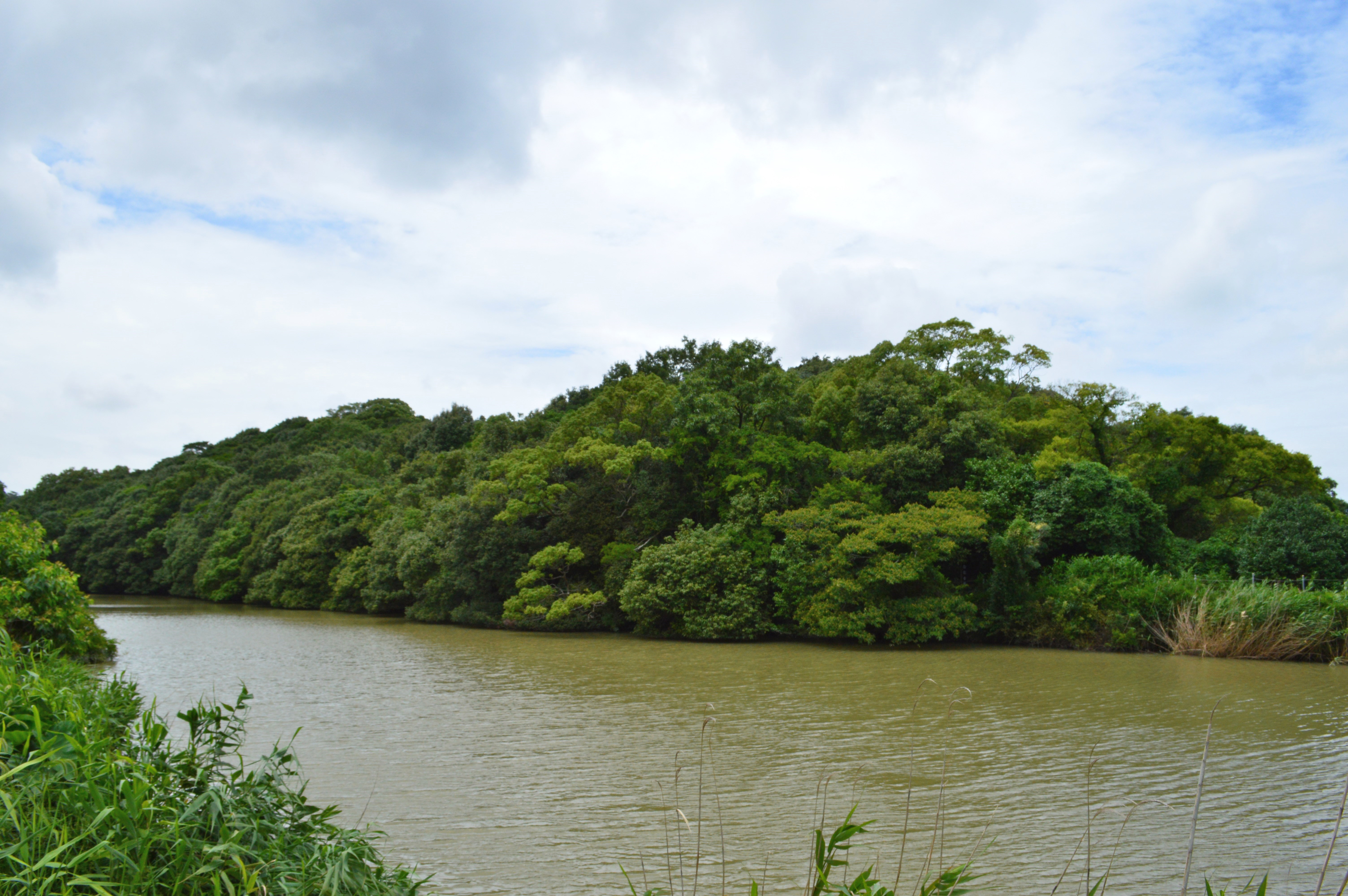
- Sairyō Kofun, anterior portion to the right, posterior portion to the left

- Sairyō Kofun Sairyō Kofun (Japan)
- Interactive map of Sairyō Kofun
- 34°19′37.31″N 135°10′8.44″E
- Type: Kofun
- Periods: Kofun period
- Location: Misaki, Osaka, Japan
- Region: Kansai region

History
- Built: 420-440 AD

Site notes
- Public access: Yes (no facilities)

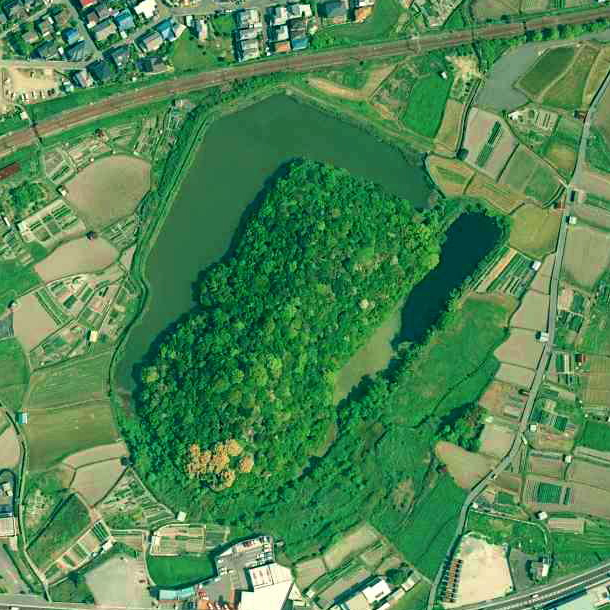
Aerial photo of Sairyō Kofun

Sairyō Kofun (西陵古墳) is a Kofun period keyhole-shaped burial mound, located in the Tannowa neighborhood of the town of Misaki, Osaka in the Kansai region of Japan. The tumulus and its surroundings were designated a National Historic Site of Japan in 1922. It is the 28th largest kofun in Japan and dates from the 5th century AD. It is also called the Nishi Nisanzai Kofun (西二山在古墳)

== Overview ==
The Sairyō Kofun is a zenpō-kōen-fun (前方後円墳), which is shaped like a keyhole, having one square end and one circular end, when viewed from above. It is located on the riverbank hills of the Ban River overlooking Osaka Bay, and is orientated to the northeast. The tumulus has a total length of 210 meters with a 115-meter diameter posterior circular portion. The mound was originally covered in fukiishi and has a square protrusion on the west side of the constriction between the posterior and anterior portions, possibly a ceremonial or offering platform. The tumulus was originally surrounded by a moat with a width of 15 to 35 meters, portions of which survive, but the original shape of the moat is unclear. It is also known that there were three shell middens outside the moat, of which one has been totally destroyed. The Sairyō Kofun is part of a larger cluster which includes the Nishikoyama Kofun, the 170-meter Tannowa Nisanzai Kofun and a number of smaller tumuli.

Details of the burial chamber are not clear. In the past a sarcophagus cover stone with two protrusions for rope-hanging on its long side was exposed at the apex of the posterior circular portion, but this has been backfilled after the designation as a national historic site. It is presumed that the burial chamber itself was a pit-type stone chamber made of blocks of tuff.

The age of this kofun is estimated to be around 420 to 440 AD from the style of excavated haniwa, which are also of a unique pattern found only at this site and at the Kinomoto Kofun Cluster in Wakayama, so it is assumed that the same ancient clan that built this tumulus controlled a territory which extended into the Kii Peninsula. According to some historians, the tumulus may be the grave of General Kikoyumi, whose name appears in the Nihon Shoki under the reign of Emperor Yuryaku. According to the Nihon Shoki, this general was sent to conquer Silla, but died in Korea due to illness and his body was returned to be buried at a place called "Tamuwa no Mura", which is believed to have been an ancient name for Tannowa.

To the north of the Sairyō Kofun are two small circular-type (empun (円墳)), designated the "Dai-ichi Kofun" and the "Dai-ni Kofun". These tumuli are also within the National Historic Site designation. There was once a third circular-type tumulus, but this was destroyed in modern times when a road was constructed, At that time, a number of Sue ware earthenware jars and fragments of iron swords were found.

The tumulus is about a 15-minute walk from Tannowa Station on the Nankai Main Line.

Total length
96 meters:
Anterior rectangular portion
100 meters long x 14 meters high, 3-tier
West Constriction
23 x 13 meters
Posterior circular portion
115 meter diameter x 18 meters high, 3-tiers

== Gallery ==
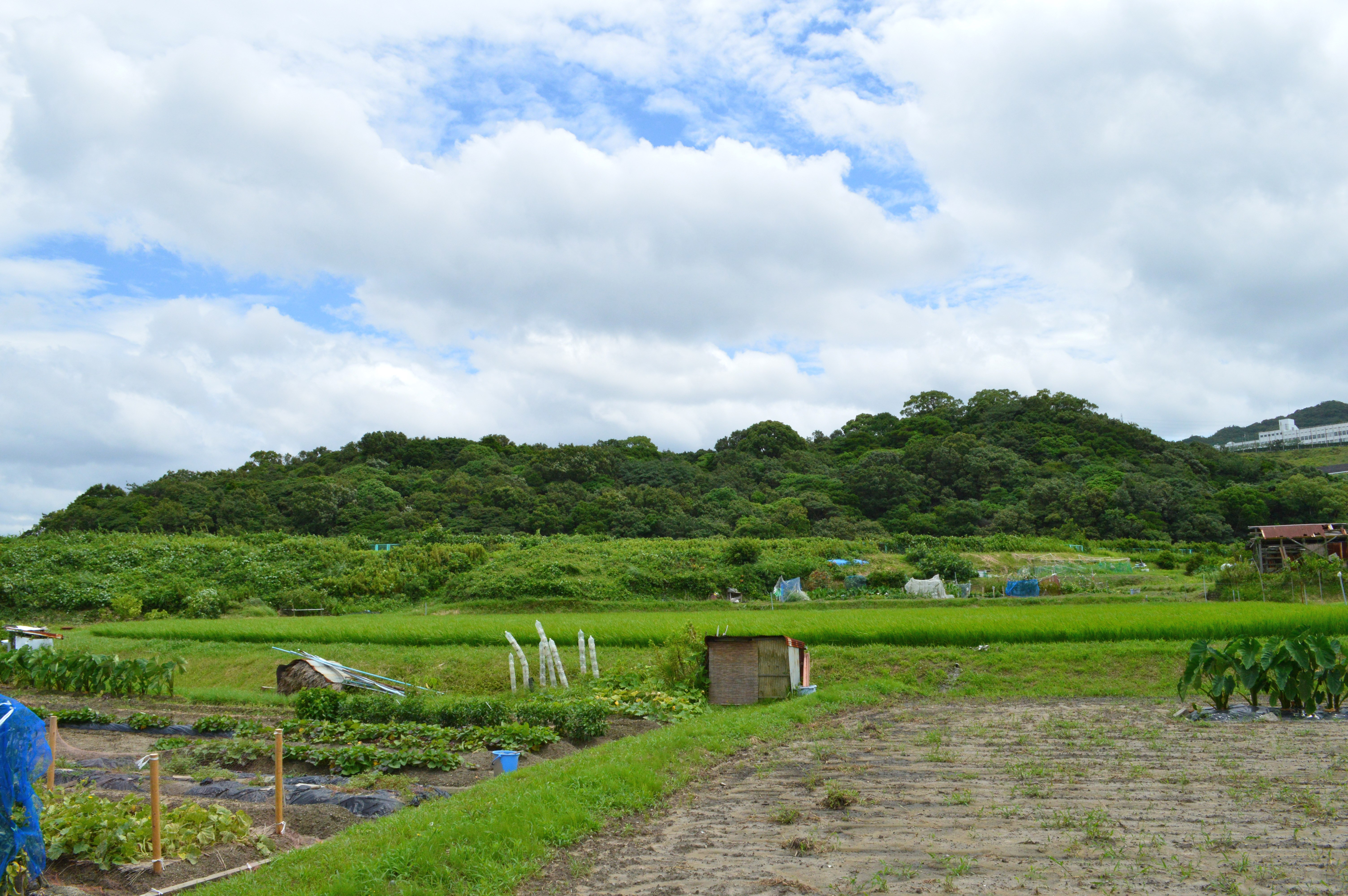
Sairyō Kofun

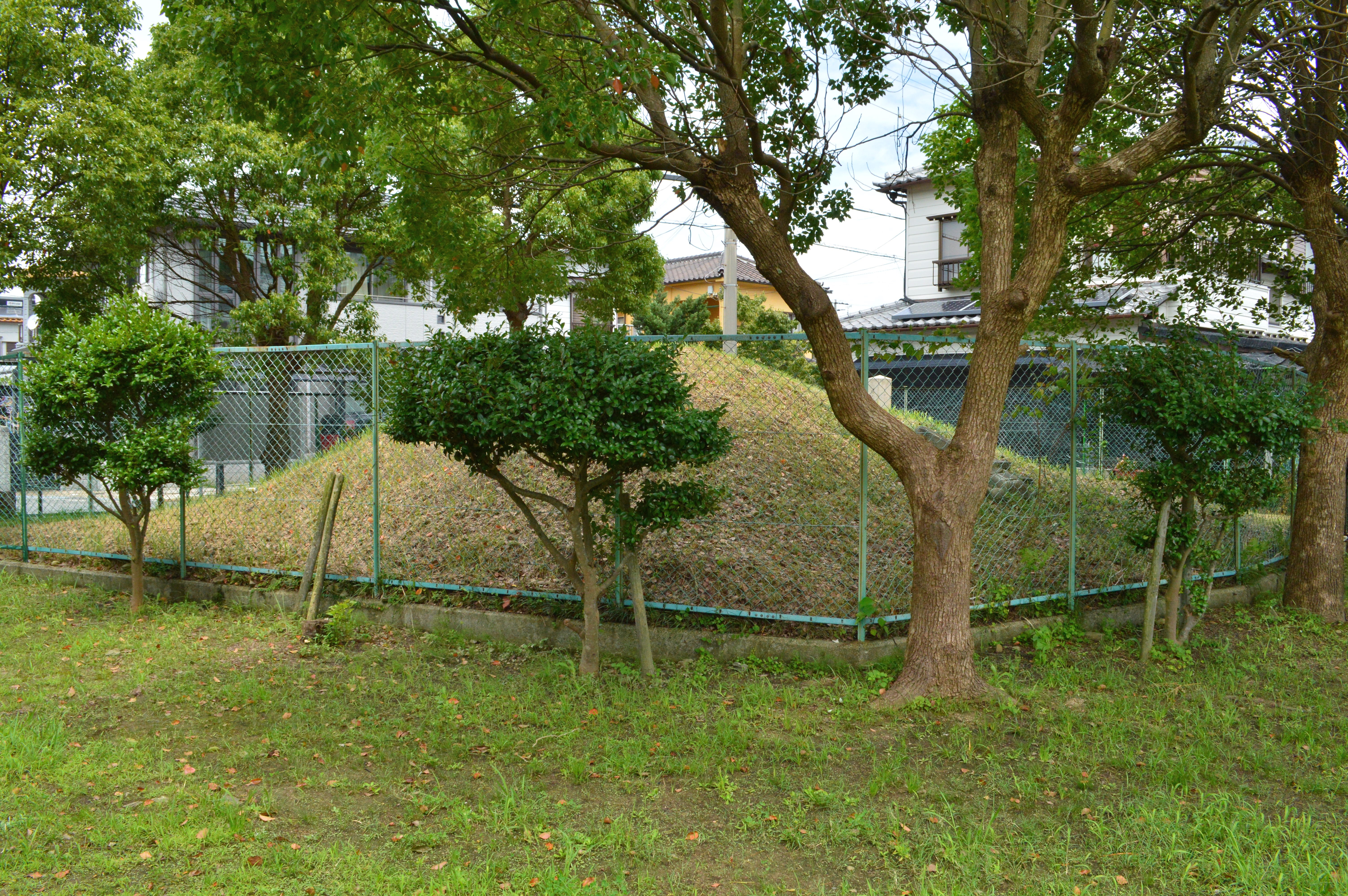
Dai-ichi Kofun

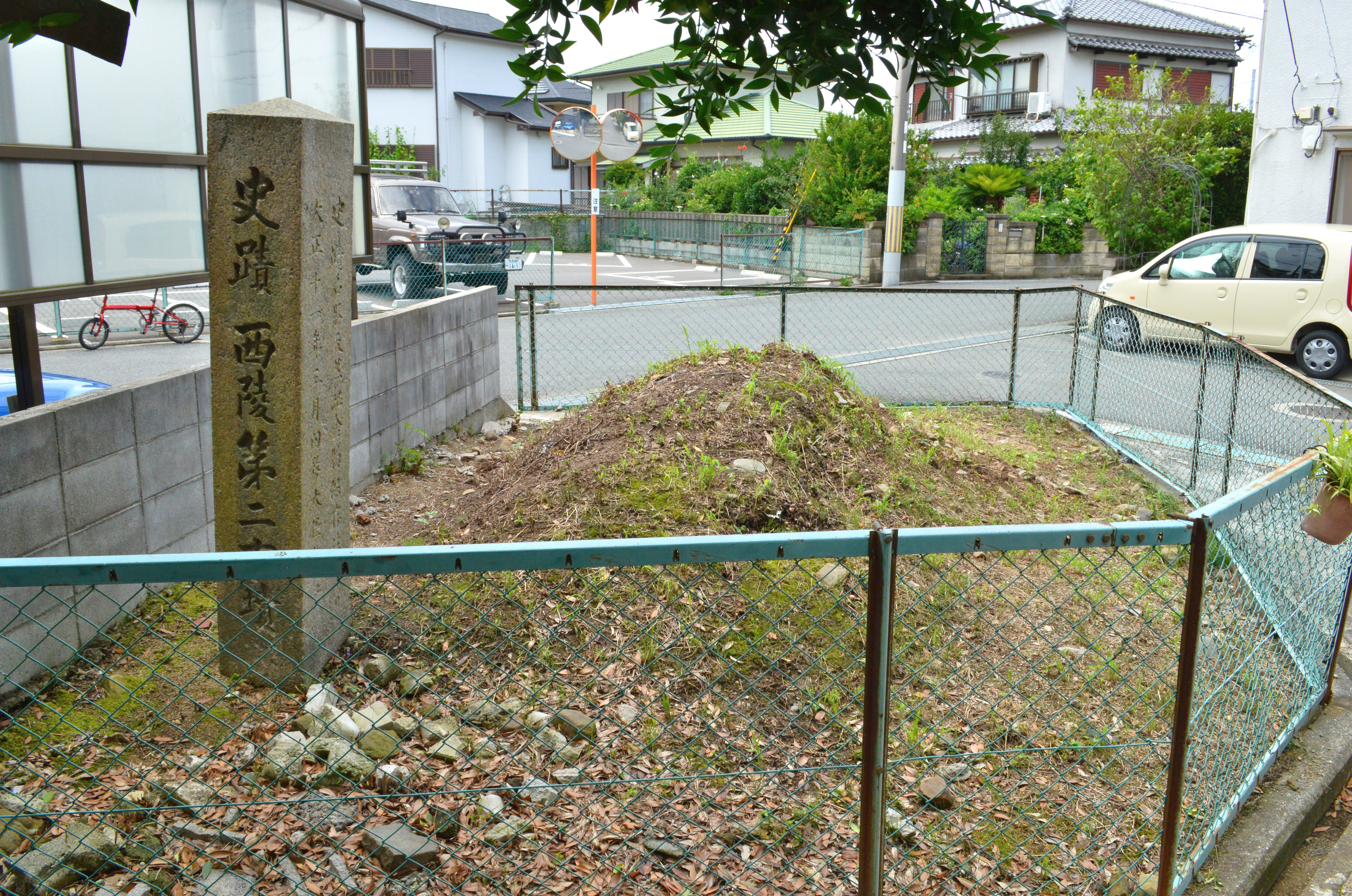
Dai-ni Kofun

== See also ==
- List of Historic Sites of Japan (Osaka)
