= Hannan, Osaka =

Hannan 阪南市
- City
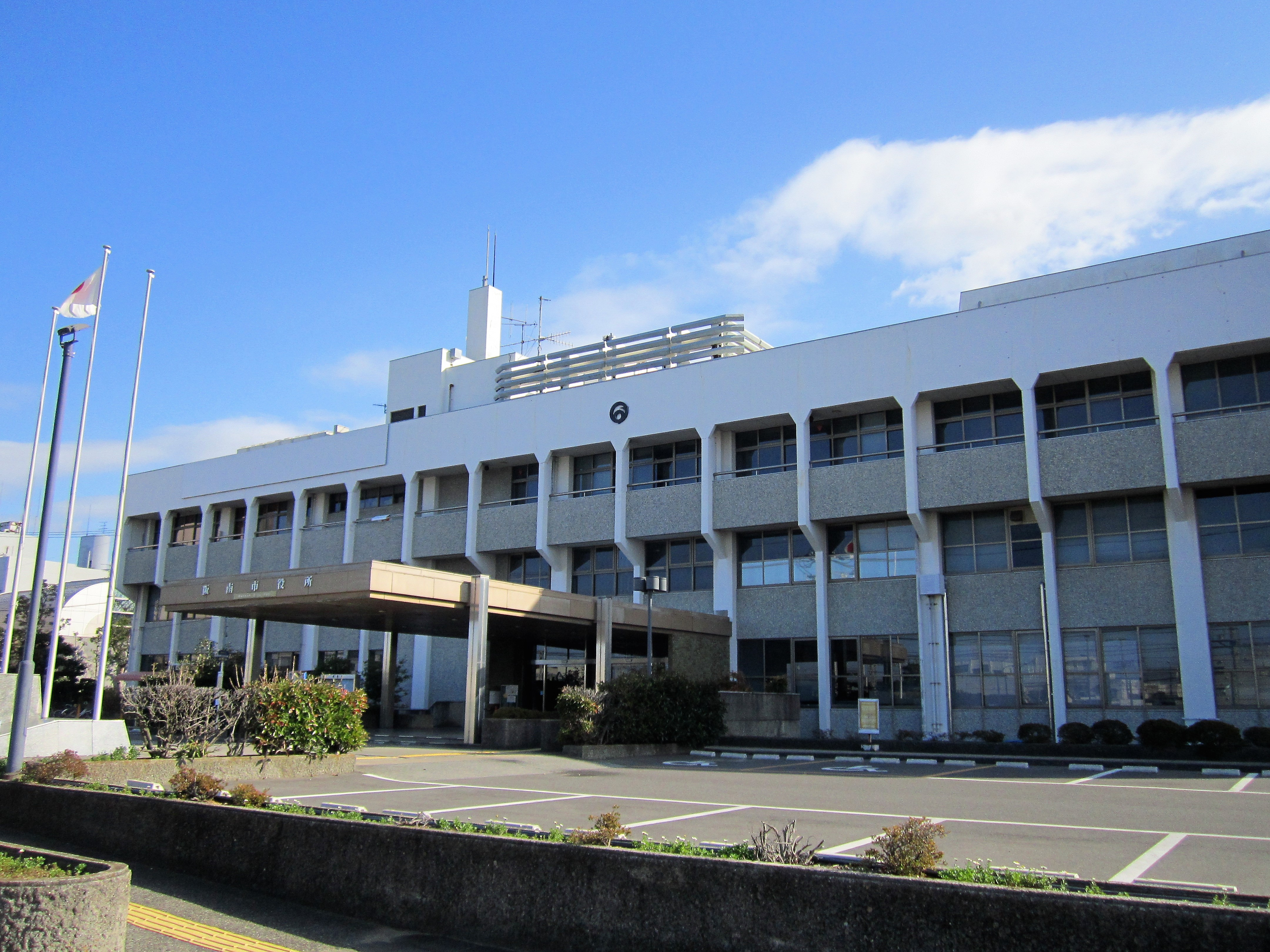
- Hannan City Hall

- Flag Seal

- Location of Hannan in Osaka Prefecture

- Coordinates: 34°21′35″N 135°14′22″E
- Country: Japan
- Region: Kansai
- Prefecture: Osaka

Government
  - Mayor: Makoto Joko

Area
  - Total: 36.17 km^{2} (13.97 sq mi)

Population (30 November 2021)
  - Total: 52,350
  - Density: 1,447/km^{2} (3,749/sq mi)
- Time zone: UTC+9 (Japan Standard Time)
- Tree: Pine
- Flower: Satsuki azalea
- Phone number: 072-471-5678
- Address: 35-1 Ozaki-chō, Hannan-shi, Ōsaka-fu 599-0201
- Website: Official website

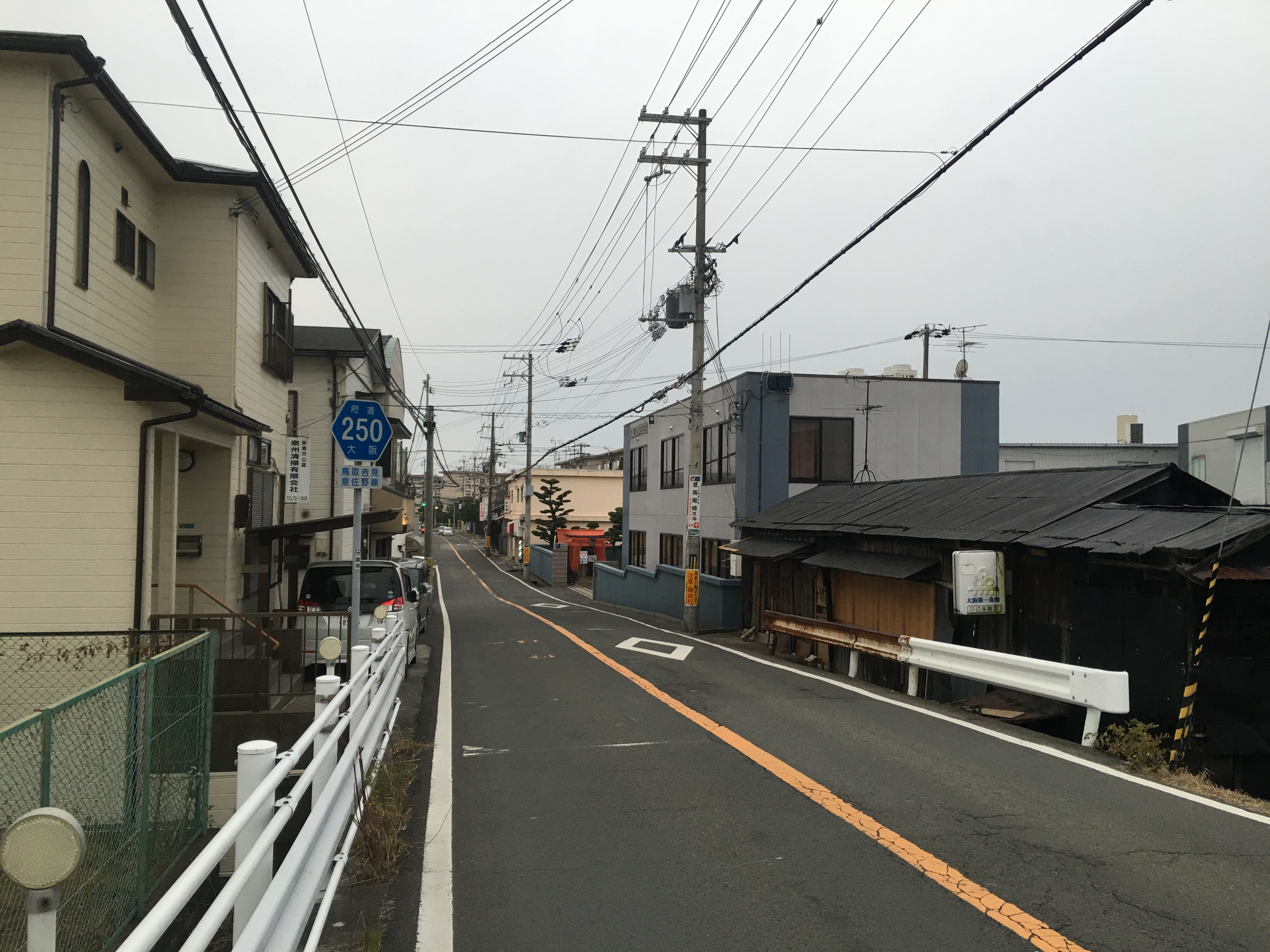
Osaka Prefectural Route 250 in Hannan

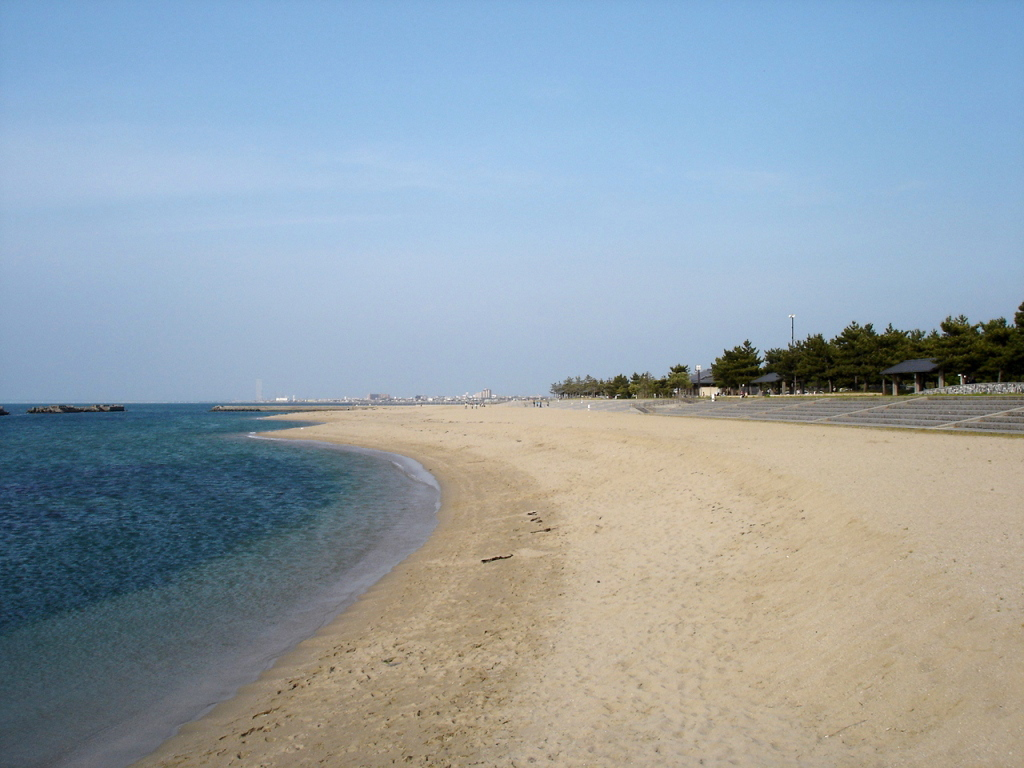
Pichipichi Beach

Hannan (阪南市, Hannan-shi) is a city located in Osaka Prefecture, Japan. As of 30 November 2021, the city had an estimated population of 52,350 in 24,093 households and a population density of 1400 persons per km^{2}. The total area of the city is 36.17 square kilometres (13.97 sq mi).

== Geography ==
Hannan is located in the southwestern part of Osaka Prefecture, bordered by Osaka Bay to the north and the Izumi Mountains and Wakayama Prefecture to the south. The city is about 45 kilometers from the center of Osaka city and about 10 kilometer from the center of Wakayama city

=== Neighboring municipalities ===
Osaka Prefecture

- Misaki
- Sennan

Wakayama Prefecture

- Iwade
- Wakayama

== Climate ==
Hannan has a humid subtropical climate (Köppen Cfa) characterized by warm summers and cool winters with light to no snowfall. The average annual temperature in Hannan is 15.9 °C. The average annual rainfall is 1713 mm with September as the wettest month. The temperatures are highest on average in August, at around 26.7 °C, and lowest in January, at around 5.7 °C.

== Demographics ==
Per Japanese census data, the population of Hannan has increased steadily from the year 1920 to the year 2000, and has started to slowly decline since.

Historical population
Year	Pop.	±%
1920	9,842	—
1930	11,901	+20.9%
1940	13,494	+13.4%
1950	16,792	+24.4%
1960	21,067	+25.5%
1970	28,322	+34.4%
1980	42,612	+50.5%
1990	54,073	+26.9%
2000	58,193	+7.6%
2010	56,663	−2.6%

== History ==
The area of the modern city of Hannan was within ancient Izumi Province. Archaeologists have found artifacts from the Japanese Paleolithic period and tombs from the Jōmon period of 10,000 years ago. The area also had many Kofun period burial mounds from the 5th to 7th century AD. In the Edo Period, much of the city area was controlled by Kishiwada Domain with smaller portions controlled by Yodo Domain or directly by the Tokugawa shogunate.

After the Meiji restoration, the villages of Ozaki, Nishitottori, Higashitottori, and Shimoshō were established within Hine District with the creation of the modern municipalities system on April 1, 1889. On April 1, 1896 the area became part of Sennan District, Osaka. Ozaki was elevated to town status on June 1, 1939. On September 30, 1956 Ozaki merged with Nishitottori-mura, and Shimoshō to form the town of Hankai (南海町). On November 1, 1960 the village of Higashitottori was elevated to town status. On October 20, 1972 the towns of Nankai and Higashitottori merged to form town of Hannan.The town's name was derived from the onyomi reading of the kanji 阪 (han), standing for Osaka Prefecture (大阪府), and the kanji 南 (nan), meaning south. Thus it means "Southern Osaka". On October 1, 1991, Hannan attained city status as the newest city in Osaka Prefecture. Hannan entered into discussions to merge with either Sennan and Misaki, or with Sennan, Misaki, Izumisano and Tajiri to form the city of "Sennanshu" (南泉州市) from 2001 to 2004; however, per a public referendum, only Misaki was in favor of the merger and the plans were abandoned.

== Government ==
Hannan has a mayor-council form of government with a directly elected mayor and a unicameral city council of 14 members. Hannan collectively with the cities of Kaizuka, Sennan, and the town of Misaki contributes two members to the Osaka Prefectural Assembly. In terms of national politics, the city is part of Osaka 19th district of the lower house of the Diet of Japan.

== Economy ==
The main industry of Hannan since the Edo Period was traditionally textile production of cotton and silk, using the abundant waters from the Izumi Mountains. At one point there were over 700 companies involved in textile production, but the rise of synthetics and overseas competition has severely impacted this industry. Likewise, Hannan was noted for its production of asbestos cloth, and more than 200 companies involved in the asbestos industry existed in Sennan from the Meiji period until the production and use of asbestos was banned. Another traditional industry is the quarrying of sandstone. In terms of primary industries, commercial fishing (including the farming of nori edible seaweed and oysters) and agriculture (notably a local variety of eggplant and onions) is also an important component of the economy.

== Education ==
Hannan has seven public elementary schools and four public middle schools operated by the city government and one public high school operated by the Osaka Prefectural Department of Education.

== Transportation ==
=== Railway ===
JR West – Hanwa Line

- Izumi-Tottori - Yamanakadani

Nankai Electric Railway - Nankai Main Line

- Ozaki - Tottorinoshō - Hakotsukuri

=== Highway ===
- Hanwa Expressway
- National Route 26

=== Buses ===
Hannan is also served by a local community bus running to and from the city hall along the main Route 26, and the Nankai Wing Bus Nanbu bus service. Nankai Wing Bus Nanbu:

- [1]: Ozaki Station - Nakamura - Izumi-Tottori - Ishida - Ozaki Station
- [A5]: Ozaki Station - Aeon Rinku Mall - Ozaki Station

== Local attractions ==
- Naniwa-masamune, a local brand of sake
- Pichi-pichi beach, a locally famous public park and beach.
