= Ueno temple ruins =

Historic religious ruin in Wakayama, Japan

- 上野廃寺跡 (Japanese)
- Location within Wakayama Prefecture Location within Japan
- 34°16′29″N 135°15′15″E
- Type: Buddhist temple ruins
- Location: Wakayama, Wakayama Prefecture, Japan

History
- Built: Asuka period
- National Historic Site of Japan

The Ueno temple ruins (上野廃寺跡, Ueno Haiji ato) is an archaeological site with the ruins of a Buddhist temple located in what is now the Ueno neighborhood of the city of Wakayama, Wakayama Prefecture, Japan. There are almost no traces of the temple remaining, and its site was designated as a National Historic Site in 1951, with the area under designation expanded in 1969.

== Overview ==
The Ueno temple ruins site is located in a place called Yakushidan, which is located in the northeastern part of Wakayama city. The site occupies a scenic location with a low cliff behind and flat land to the south. Based on the results of an archaeological excavation conducted from 1968, the temple had a layout similar to that of Yakushi-ji in Nara with a Kondō and twin pagodas surrounded by a cloister. The foundation stones for these three buildings are relatively well-preserved, but the sites of the south gate and part of the east corridor have disappeared due to the development of surrounding houses. Likewise, the location and layout of the Lecture Hall is not well defined. Due to the topography of the site, it was not possible to situate the Lecture Hall in a line behind the Kondō, so it appears to have been constructed to the west of the West Pagoda.

Numerous shards of Hakuhō period roof tiles have been found. Some eaves tiles had a double lotus motif, and some had an arabesque pattern which is also seen at Hōryū-ji in Ikaruga, Nara. From these tiles, it is believed that the temple was founded in the Asuka Period, in the second half of the 7th century AD, but the temple does not appear in any known documentation, so its name and its subsequent history are unknown, although it is believed to have survived until the latter half of the 10th century.

The site is about a 15-minute walk from Kii Station on the JR West Hanwa Line.

== See also ==
- List of Historic Sites of Japan (Wakayama)
