= Yamanakadani Station =

Railway station in Hannan, Osaka Prefecture, Japan

Yamanakadani Station 山中渓駅
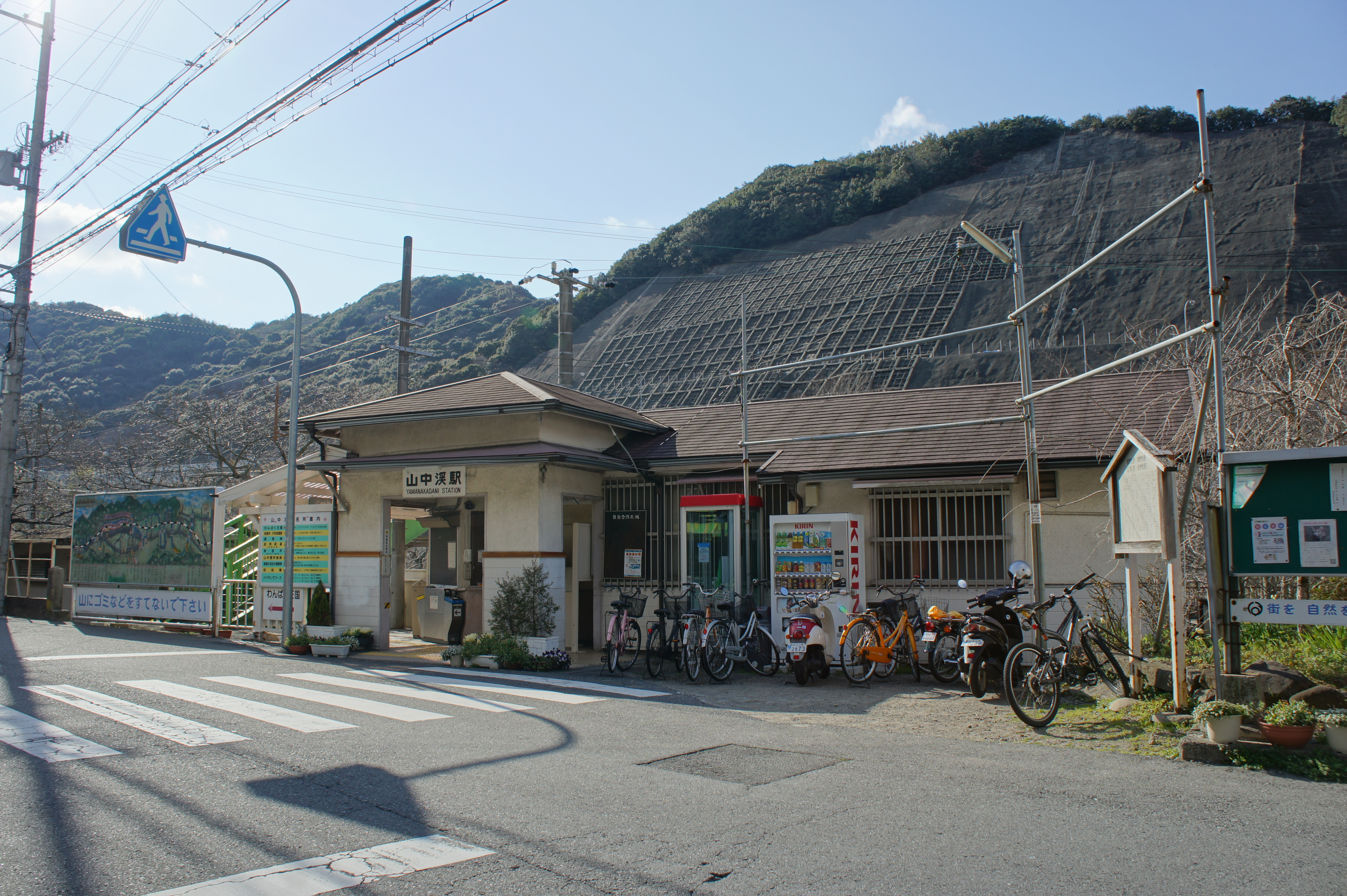
- Yamanakadani Station entrance

General information
- Location: 134 Yamanakadani, Hannan-shi, Osaka-fu 599-0214; Japan
- Coordinates: 34.3257°N 135.2695°E
- System: JR-West commuter rail station
- Owner: West Japan Railway Company
- Operator: West Japan Railway Company
- Line: R Hanwa Line
- Distance: 45.2 km (28.1 miles) from Tennōji
- Platforms: 2 side platforms
- Tracks: 2
- Train operators: West Japan Railway Company

Other information
- Status: Unstaffed
- Station code: JR-R50
- Website: Official website

History
- Opened: 16 June 1930

Passengers
- FY2019: 179 daily
Services
| Preceding station | JR-West | Following station |
Hanwa Line
| Izumi-Tottori | Local | Kii |
| Izumi-Tottori | Regional Rapid Service (southbound only) | Kii |
| Izumi-Tottori | Kishuji Rapid Service (except part of trains in the morning) | Kii |
Rapid Service: Does not stop at this station
Direct Rapid Service: Does not stop at this station
Limited Express Kuroshio: Does not stop at this station
Location
- Location within Osaka Prefecture Location within Japan

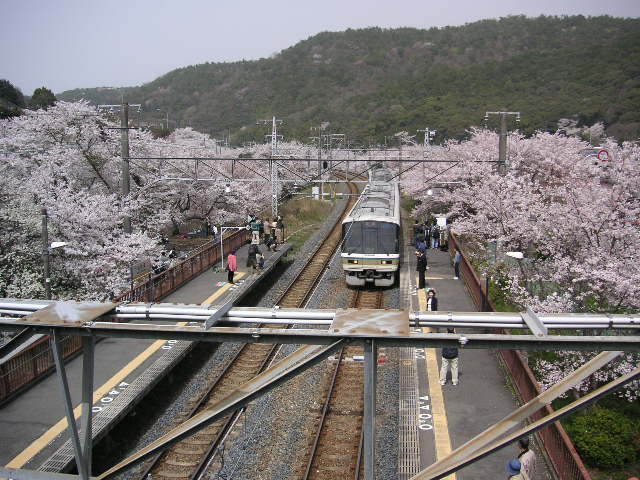
Platforms of Yamanakadani Station

Yamanakadani Station (山中渓駅, Yamanakadani-eki) is a passenger railway station in located in the city of Hannan, Osaka Prefecture, Japan, operated by West Japan Railway Company (JR West).

== Lines ==
Yamanakadani Station is served by the Hanwa Line, and is located 45.2 kilometers from the northern terminus of the line at Tennōji.

== Station layout ==
The station consists of two island platforms connected to the station building by a footbridge. The station his unattended, and is administrated by Izumi-Sunagawa Station.

=== Platforms ===
| 1 | ■ Hanwa Line | for Hineno and Tennoji; Change trains at Hineno for Kansai Airport. |
| 2 | ■ Hanwa Line | for Kii and Wakayama |

== History ==
Yamanakadani Station opened on 16 June 1930. With the privatization of the Japan National Railways (JNR) on 1 April 1987, the station came under the aegis of the West Japan Railway Company.

Station numbering was introduced in March 2018 with Yamanakadani being assigned station number JR-R50.

== Passenger statistics ==
In fiscal 2019, the station was used by an average of 179 passengers daily (boarding passengers only).

== Surrounding Area ==
- Yamanaka Gorge
- Yamanaka Shrine
- Jifuku-ji
- Sakaibashi, --Prefectural border with Wakayama

== See also ==
- List of railway stations in Japan
