= Kii-Nakanoshima Station =

Railway station in Wakayama, Wakayama Prefecture, Japan

Kii-Nakanoshima Station 紀伊中ノ島駅
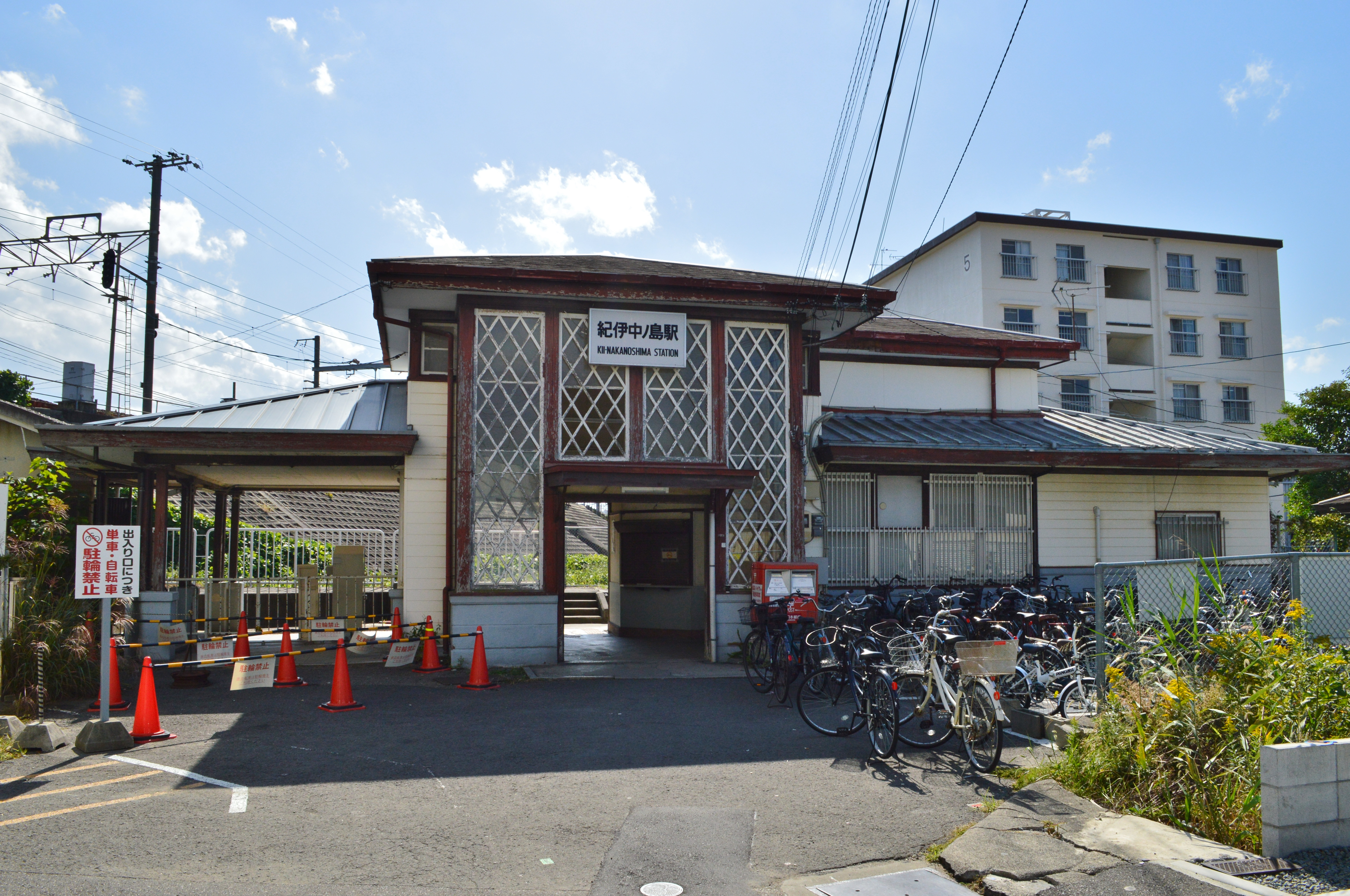
- Kii-Nakanoshima Station, October 2018

General information
- Location: 391-4 Nakanoshima-cho, Wakayama City, Wakayama Prefecture 640-8392; Japan
- Coordinates: 34.2428°N 135.1905°E
- Operator: JR West
- Line: R Hanwa Line
- Distance: 60.2 km (37.4 miles) from Tennōji
- Platforms: 2 side platforms
- Tracks: 2

Construction
- Structure type: At grade

Other information
- Status: Unstaffed
- Station code: JR-R53
- Website: Official website

History
- Opened: 1 January 1932; 94 years ago

Passengers
- FY2019: 462 daily
Services
Preceding station	JR-West	Following station
Hanwa Line
Musota	Local	Wakayama
Musota	Regional Rapid Service (southbound only)	Wakayama
Musota	Kishuji Rapid Service (except part of trains in the morning)	Wakayama
Rapid Service: Does not stop at this station
Direct Rapid Service: Does not stop at this station
Limited Express Kuroshio: Does not stop at this station
Location
- Location within Wakayama Prefecture Location within Kansai region Location within Japan

Kii-Nakanoshima Station (紀伊中ノ島駅, Kii-Nakanoshima-eki) is a passenger railway station in located in the city of Wakayama, Wakayama Prefecture, Japan, operated by West Japan Railway Company (JR West).

== Lines ==
Kii-Nakanoshima Station is served by the Hanwa Line, and is located 60.2 kilometres (37.4 mi) from the northern terminus of the line at Tennōji.

== Station layout ==
The station consists of two opposed side platforms located on an embankment, and connected to the station building by stairs. The station is unattended.

=== Platforms ===
1	■ R Hanwa Line	for Hineno and Tennōji
2	■ R Hanwa Line	for Wakayama

== Adjacent stations ==
«	Service	»
JR West
Hanwa Line
Musota	Local	Wakayama
Musota	Regional Rapid Service (southbound only)	Wakayama
Musota	Kishuji Rapid Service (except part of trains in the morning)	Wakayama
Rapid Service: Does not stop at this station
Direct Rapid Service: Does not stop at this station
Limited Express Kuroshio: Does not stop at this station

== History ==
Kii-Nakanoshima Station opened on January 1, 1932 as Nakanoshima Station (中ノ島駅) on the Hanwa Electric Railway, and was renamed Hanwa-Nakanoshima Station (阪和中之島駅) 15 days later on January 13, 1932. The Wakayama Line Kii-Nakanoshima Station was opened on January 1, 1935 and the Hanwa Electric Railway station was forced to shift 100 meters to the south. On September 25, 1936, the Hanwa Electric Railway station was abolished, and its operations were transferred to Kii-Nakanoshima Station. On December 1, 1940, the Hanwa Electric Railway was merged into the Nankai Electric Railway, which was nationalized on May 1, 1944 with the line becoming the Hanwa Line. On October 1, 1974 due to a re-routing of the Wakayama Line, only the Hanwa Line remained at Kii-Nakanoshima Station. With the privatization of the Japan National Railways (JNR) on April 1, 1987, the station came under the aegis of the West Japan Railway Company. In March 2018, station numbering was introduced with Kii-Nakanoshima being assigned station number JR-R53.

== Passenger statistics ==
In fiscal 2019, the station was used by an average of 462 passengers daily (boarding passengers only).

== Surrounding Area ==
- Wakayama City Kinokawa Junior High School

== See also ==
- List of railway stations in Japan
