= Tottorinoshō Station =

Train station in Hannan, Osaka, Japan

Tottorinoshō Station 鳥取ノ荘駅
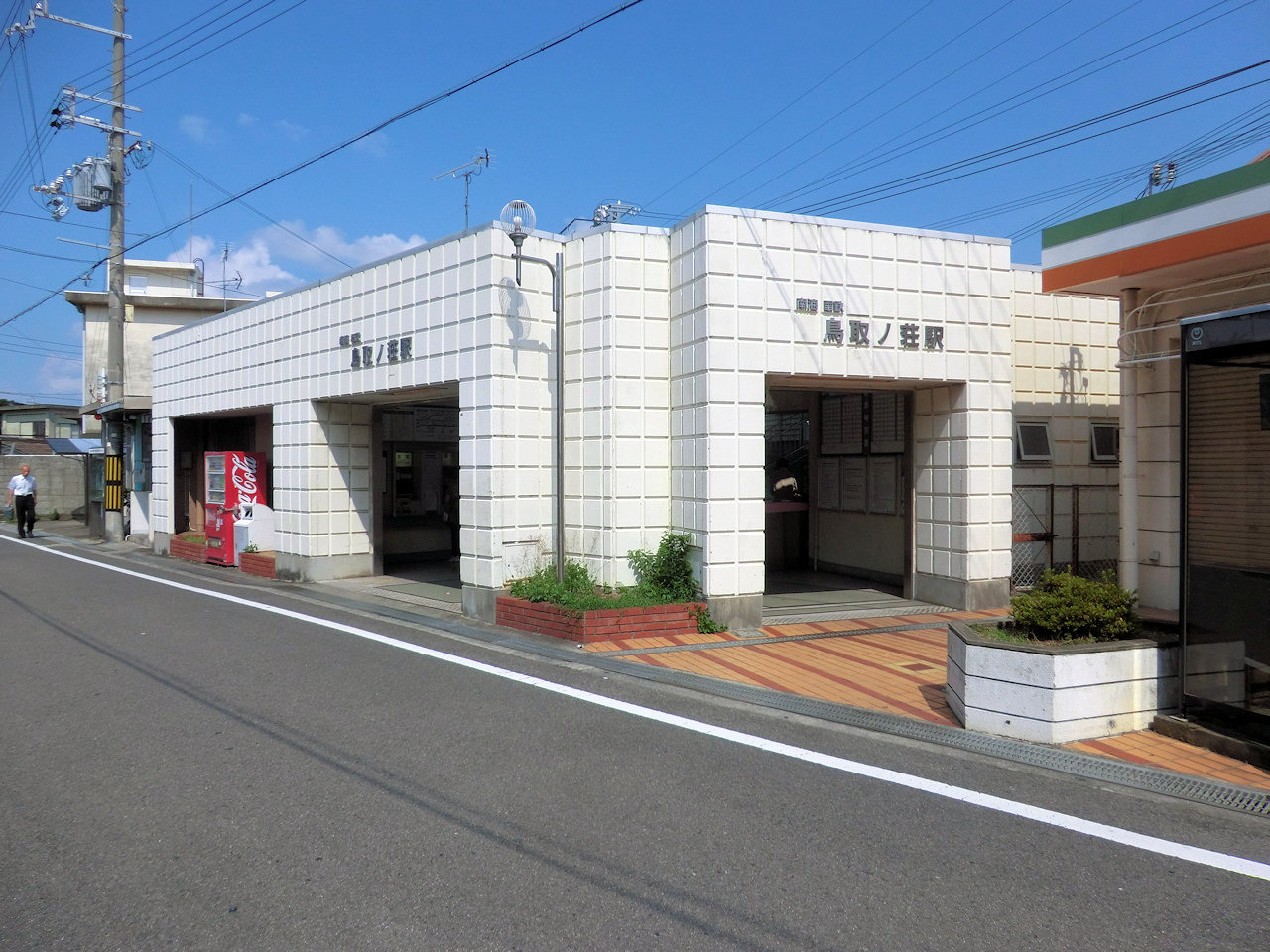
- Tottorinoshō Station in July 2012

General information
- Location: 665, Tottori, Hannan-shi, Osaka-fu 599-0204; Japan
- Coordinates: 34°21′05″N 135°13′53″E
- Operator: Nankai Electric Railway
- Line: Nankai Main Line
- Distance: 44.6 km from Namba
- Platforms: 2 side platforms
- Connections: Bus stop

Other information
- Station code: NK38
- Website: Official website

History
- Opened: 1 March 1919; 107 years ago

Passengers
- 2019: 3435 daily

Services
Preceding station	Nankai Electric Railway	Following station
Ozaki towards Namba	Nankai Main Line Local Sub. Express	Hakotsukuri towards Wakayamashi
Location
- Location within Osaka Prefecture Location within Japan

Tottorinoshō Station (鳥取ノ荘駅, Tottorinoshō-eki) is a passenger railway station located in the city of Hannan, Osaka Prefecture, Japan, operated by the private railway operator Nankai Electric Railway. It has the station number "NK38".

== Lines ==
Tottorinoshō Station is served by the Nankai Main Line, and is 44.6 kilometers (27.7 mi) from the terminus of the line at Namba.

== Layout ==
The station has two opposed side platforms connected by a level crossing. The station is unattended.

=== Platforms ===
1	■ Nankai Line	for Wakayamashi
2	■ Nankai Line	for Namba and Kansai Airport

== History ==
Tottorinoshō Station opened on 1 March 1919.

== Passenger statistics ==
In fiscal 2019, the station was used by an average of 3435 passengers daily.

== Surrounding area ==
- Hannan Nishitottori Post Office

== See also ==
- List of railway stations in Japan
