= Musota Station =

Railway station in Wakayama, Wakayama Prefecture, Japan

Musota Station 六十谷駅
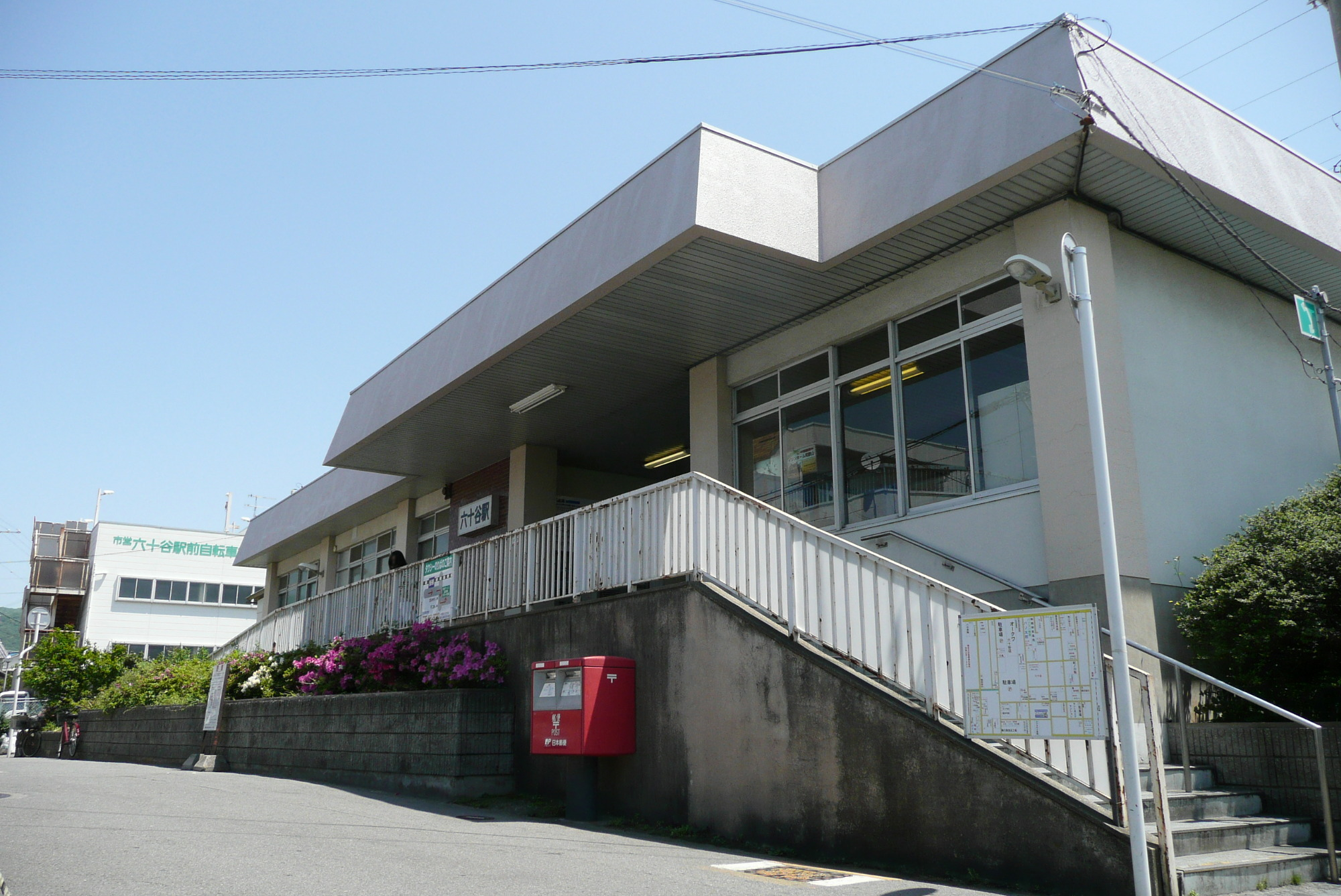
- Musota Station, May 2008

General information
- Location: 351 Musota-cho, Wakayama-shi, Wakayama-ken640-8482; Japan
- Coordinates: 34.2625°N 135.2071°E
- System: JR-West commuter rail station
- Owner: West Japan Railway Company
- Operator: West Japan Railway Company
- Line: R Hanwa Line
- Distance: 57.2 km (35.5 miles) from Tennōji
- Platforms: 2 side platforms
- Tracks: 2

Other information
- Status: Staffed
- Station code: JR-R52
- Website: Official website

History
- Opened: 16 June 1930

Passengers
- FY2019: 3446 daily
Services
Preceding station	JR-West	Following station
Hanwa Line
Limited Express Kuroshio: Does not stop at this station
Kii	Local	Kii-Nakanoshima
Kii	Regional Rapid Service (southbound only)	Kii-Nakanoshima
Kii	Kishuji Rapid Service	Kii-Nakanoshima
Kii	Kishuji Rapid Service (part of trains in the morning)	Wakayama
Kii	Rapid Service	Wakayama
Kii	Direct Rapid Service	Wakayama
Location
- Location within Wakayama Prefecture Location within Japan

Musota Station (六十谷駅, Musota-eki) is a passenger railway station in located in the city of Wakayama, Wakayama Prefecture, Japan, operated by West Japan Railway Company (JR West).

== Lines ==
Musota Station is served by the Hanwa Line, and is located 57.2 kilometers from the northern terminus of the line at Tennoji.

== Station layout ==
The station consists of two opposed side platforms connected to the station building by a footbridge. The station is staffed.

=== Platforms ===
1	■ R Hanwa Line	for Hineno and Tennōji
2	■ R Hanwa Line	for Wakayama

== History ==
Musota Station opened on June 16, 1930. With the privatization of the Japan National Railways (JNR) on April 1, 1987, the station came under the aegis of the West Japan Railway Company.

Station numbering was introduced in March 2018 with Musota being assigned station number JR-R52.

== Passenger statistics ==
In fiscal 2019, the station was used by an average of 3446 passengers daily (boarding passengers only).

== Surrounding Area ==
- Honeeji Temple (commonly known as "Naokawa Kannon")
- Kaichi Junior and Senior High School
- Wakayama Municipal Wakayama High School
- Kinki University Wakayama High School / Junior High School

== See also ==
- List of railway stations in Japan
