= Kii Station =

Railway station in Wakayama, Wakayama Prefecture, Japan

Kii Station 紀伊駅
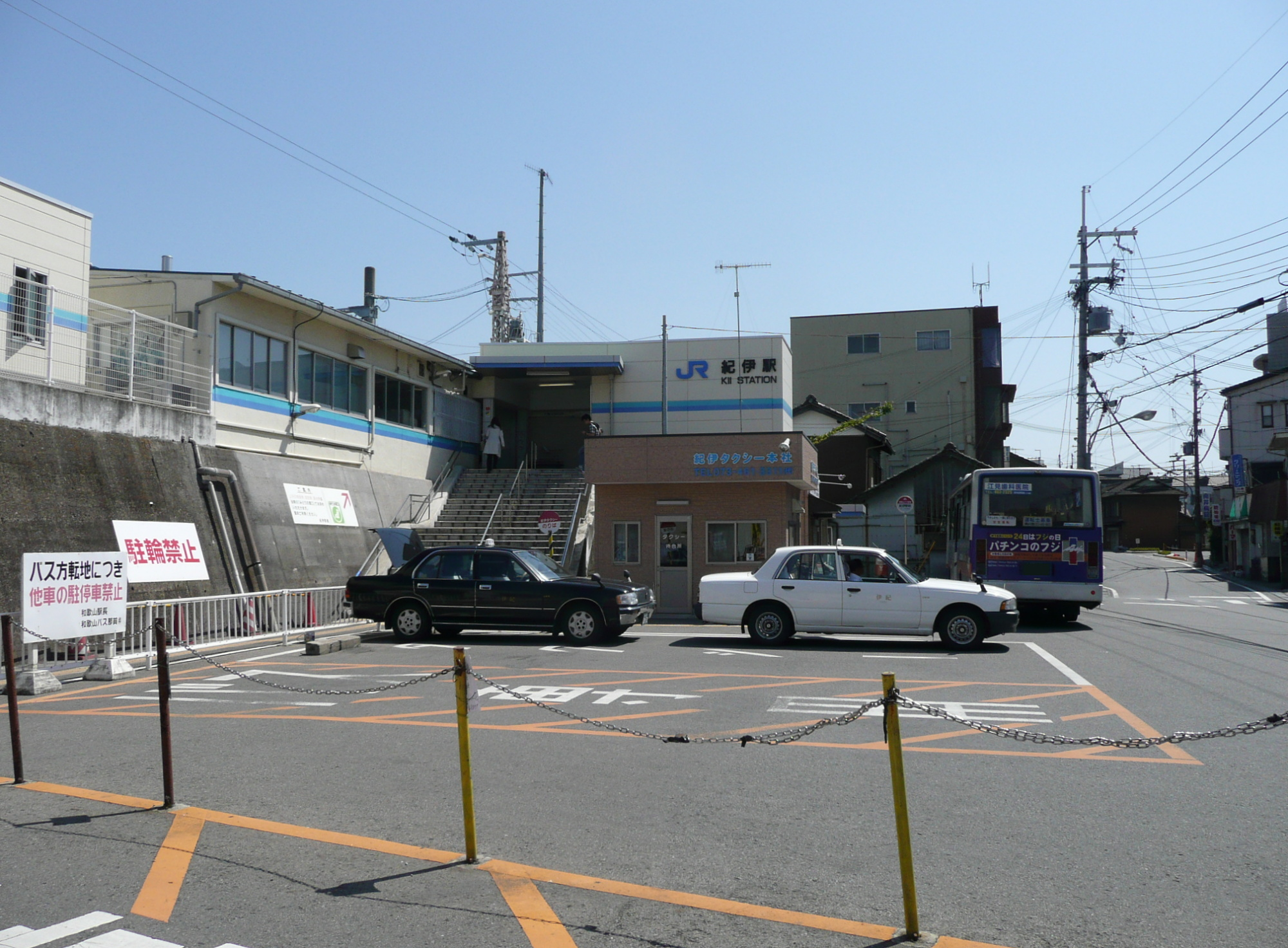
- Kii Station, May 2008

General information
- Location: 441 Kitano-cho, Wakayama-shi, Wakayama-ken 649-6331; Japan
- Coordinates: 34.2692°N 135.2461°E
- System: JR-West commuter rail station
- Owner: West Japan Railway Company
- Operator: West Japan Railway Company
- Line: R Hanwa Line
- Distance: 53.3 km (33.1 miles) from Tennōji
- Platforms: 2 island platforms
- Tracks: 4
- Train operators: West Japan Railway Company

Construction
- Structure type: At grade

Other information
- Status: Staffed (Midori no Madoguchi )
- Station code: JR-R51
- Website: Official website

History
- Opened: 16 June 1930

Passengers
- FY2019: 3882 daily
Services
Preceding station	JR-West	Following station
Hanwa Line
Limited Express Kuroshio: Does not stop at this station
Yamanakadani	Local	Musota
Yamanakadani	Regional Rapid Service (southbound only)	Musota
Yamanakadani	Kishuji Rapid Service	Musota
Izumi-Sunagawa	Kishuji Rapid Service (part of trains in the morning)	Musota
Izumi-Sunagawa	Rapid Service	Musota
Izumi-Sunagawa	Direct Rapid Service	Musota
Location
- Location within Wakayama Prefecture Location within Japan

Kii Station (紀伊駅, Kii-eki) is a passenger railway station in located in the city of Wakayama, Wakayama Prefecture, Japan, operated by West Japan Railway Company (JR West).

== Lines ==
Kii Station is served by the Hanwa Line, and is located 53.3 kilometers from the northern terminus of the line at Tennōji.

== Station layout ==
The station consists of two island platforms connected to the station building by a footbridge. The station has a Midori no Madoguchi staffed ticket office.

=== Platforms ===
1, 2	■ R Hanwa Line	for Wakayama
3, 4	■ R Hanwa Line	for Hineno and Tennōji

== Adjacent stations ==
«	Service	»
JR West
Hanwa Line
Limited Express Kuroshio: Does not stop at this station
Yamanakadani	Local	Musota
Yamanakadani	Regional Rapid Service (southbound only)	Musota
Yamanakadani	Kishuji Rapid Service	Musota
Izumi-Sunagawa	Kishuji Rapid Service (part of trains in the morning)	Musota
Izumi-Sunagawa	Rapid Service	Musota
Izumi-Sunagawa	Direct Rapid Service	Musota

== History ==
Kii Station opened on 16 June 1930. With the privatization of the Japan National Railways (JNR) on 1 April 1987, the station came under the aegis of the West Japan Railway Company.

Station numbering was introduced in March 2018 with Kii being assigned station number JR-R51.

== Passenger statistics ==
In fiscal 2019, the station was used by an average of 3882 passengers daily (boarding passengers only).

== Surrounding Area ==
- Wakayama City Kii Elementary School
- Wakayama City Kii Junior High School
- Wakayama Prefectural Kii Cosmos Support School
- Ueno temple ruins

== See also ==
- List of railway stations in Japan
