= Nekonomics =

Cat-related economic consumption in Japan

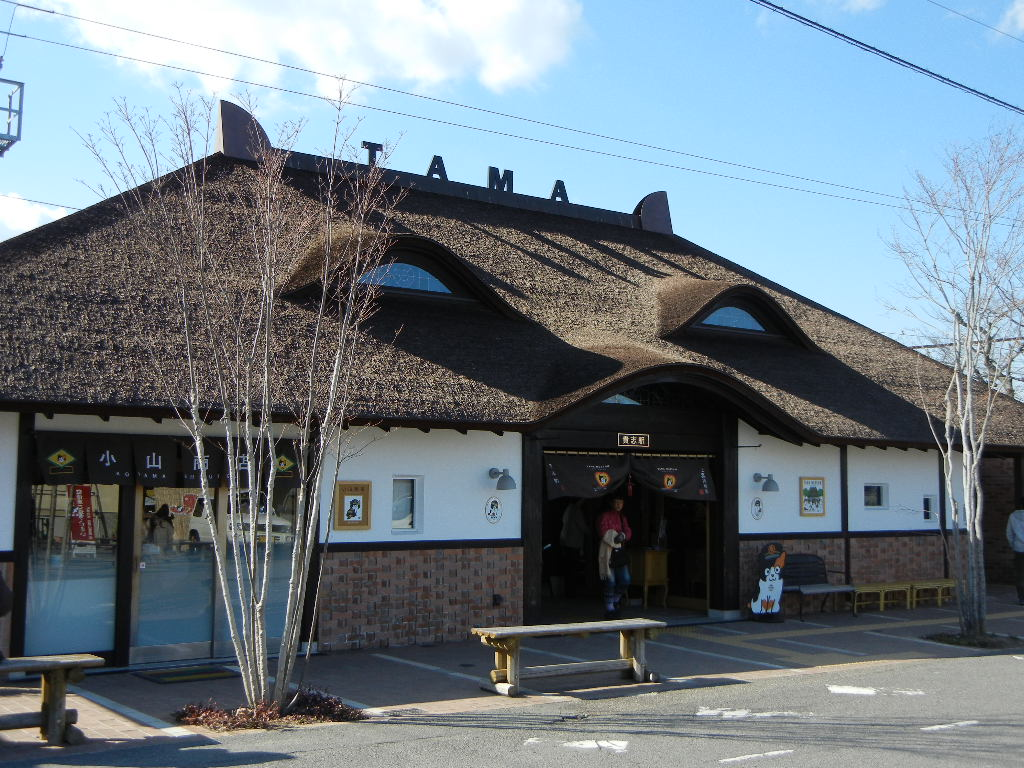
Kishi Station has been redesigned to resemble a cat, following the popularity it gained by appointing the cat Tama as station master.

Nekonomics (ネコノミクス), a term blending neko, the Japanese word for cat, and economics, describes the phenomenon of cat-related economic consumption in Japan. This includes the sale of products marketed towards cat owners, the use of cat imagery to sell products, and the use of living cats to attract customers and tourists. While cats have always enjoyed popularity in Japanese culture, being seen as kawaii (cute) and associated with good health, their popularity and economic impact increased significantly in the early 21st century. The term nekonomics was created around 2015, a pun on Japan's Abenomics economic policy.

The adoption of Tama as the station master of Kishi Station in 2007 led to the station becoming a significant tourist attraction, and sparked a number of copycat attempts to boost tourism using cats. Islands with stray cat populations have become tourist draws, and cats are used to market products and services to Japanese consumers. February 22 has become known as "Cat Day". As of 2024, the size of the nekonomic market in Japan was estimated to be almost ¥2.5 trillion.

== History and conception ==
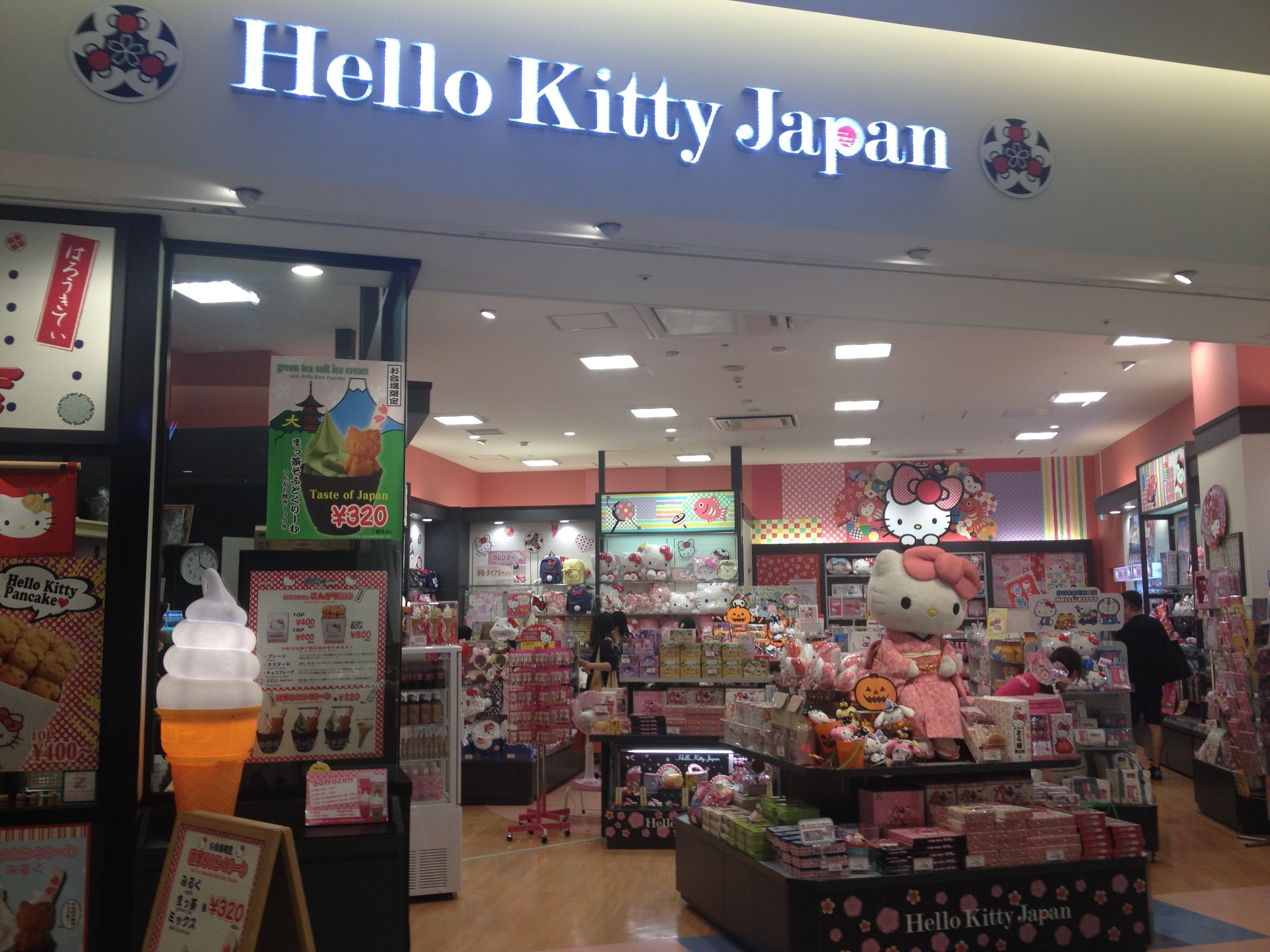
Hello Kitty has been a popular character in Japan for decades.

Cat-related economic consumption has a long history in Japan, demonstrated through the lasting popularity of characters such as Hello Kitty. In the early 21st century, such consumption started to expand alongside the growing popularity of cats. The appointment of the cat Tama as a station master in 2007 became such a sensation that Kishi Station went from risking being closed to becoming a tourist destination. Tama died in 2015, leaving a legacy of a boom in efforts to take advantage of cat popularity.

From 2012 to 2016, the number of pet cats in Japan grew by around 300,000. One estimate suggests that cat ownership surpassed dog ownership by as early as 2014, although other estimates suggest this happened a couple of years later. This rise in popularity was reflected in cats becoming more common in Japanese popular culture. More cat-related movies and books were made, and from 2014 to 2015 the presence of cats in commercials increased by 50%. Cat cafés grew in popularity, becoming widely viewed as a draw for tourists. The mobile game Neko Atsume, where players collect cats, became a hit. There was reportedly a rise in single men living with cats for companionship.

The term "nekonomics" was created in 2015 by Katsuhiro Miyamoto, professor at Kansai University, to describe this phenomenon of rising cat-related consumption. The word "neko" means "cat" in Japanese, making "nekonomics" equivalent to "catonomics". It was likely influenced by "Abenomics", the term used to name economic policy of Japan at the time. One researcher who subsequently studied nekonomics called themself a "nekonomist". Nekonomics was defined as including the sale of products marketed towards cat owners, the use of cat imagery to sell products, and the use of living cats to attract customers and tourists.

The COVID-19 pandemic contributed to the national desire for cats, due to those spending more time in their homes wanting companionship. In 2021 alone, it is thought that there were 320,000 new pet cats, contributing to the 8.94 million pet cats in the country. The market size of nekonomic products and services was estimated to be almost ¥2 trillion in 2021. The value was expected to be near ¥2.5 trillion in 2024.

== Cat appeal ==
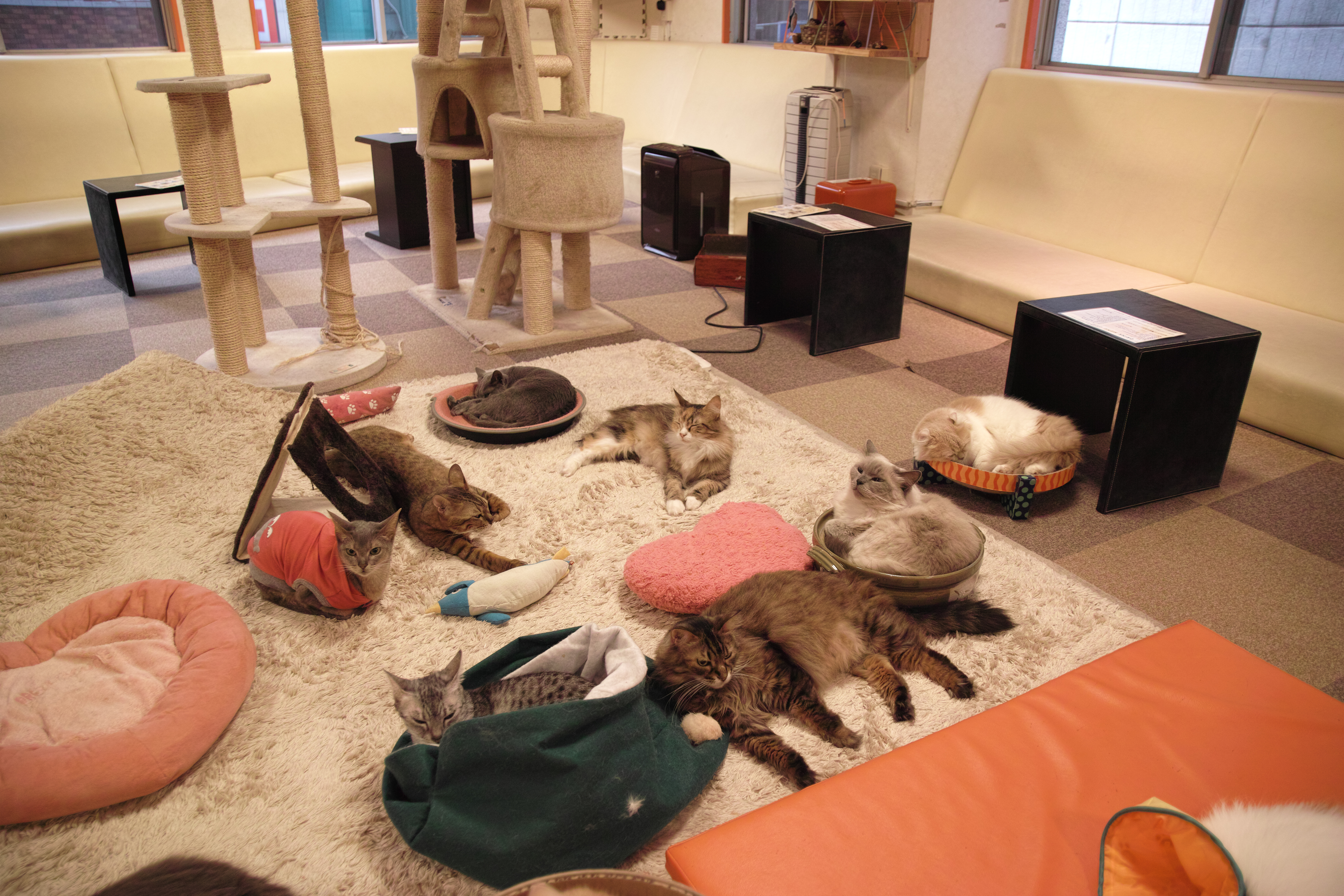
A cat café in Tokyo

In Japan, cats are widely considered to be emblematic of kawaii (cute), being seen as neotenic, soft, and gentle. The rising popularity of cats compared to dogs may be due to it being easier and cheaper to care for them.

The presence of cats is associated with healing properties, contributing to the popularity of places such as cat cafés, which have become increasingly common. Cat cafés meet the desire for cats among those who are unable to keep pets in their homes.

== Impacts ==
Cat-themed goods and services have become more popular throughout Japan. There has been a rise in cat-related literature, including the opening of at least one cat-focused bookstore. The number of television ads including cats has increased. Companies that traditionally catered to other markets have created pet divisions to appeal to the cat market. A deodorant company developed a kitty litter deodorant, and a diaper company created cat diapers. Cats have been used in matchmaking apps.

February 22 has become known as "Cat Day", due to similarities between the pronunciation of 2-2-2 and "nyan nyan nyan" (nyan being the Japanese onomatopoeia for meow).

=== Tourism ===
Nekonomics has influenced Japan's heritage tourism, as the adoption of kawaii is thought to give the sites wider appeal. One example is Bitchū Matsuyama Castle. Heavy rainfall damaged the road approaching this site in 2018, reducing tourist numbers. However, a cat took shelter in the castle during the storm, and when the castle reopened the cat became famous for greeting visitors. He was officially named lord of the castle by the local tourism association, and named Sanjuro after a historical local samurai from the Sengoku period.

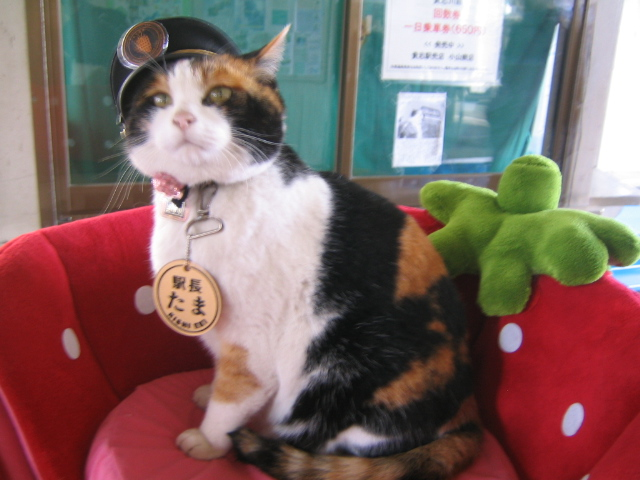
The appointment of Tama as station master of Kishi Station in 2007 saved the station and added an estimated ¥1.1 billion to the local economy.

Nekonomics has also created entirely new tourist attractions. The appointment of Tama as station master of Kishi Station turned the station into a tourist attraction, despite it previously appealing solely to train enthusiasts. A kitten from a stray cat who was taken in by a shopkeeper in the station, Tama was given the formal position of station master to ensure she would not have to leave even if her shop was removed due to financial issues. Tama was given a uniform, and her appointment led to a revival of the railway's financial fortunes. She received a number of promotions and eventually became honorary president of Wakayama Electric Railway. It is thought that Tama's presence brought ¥1.1 billion into the local economy. After Tama died in 2015, successors were adopted to take over her position. Following a renewed financial crisis brought about by the COVID-19 pandemic, the railway launched a "Tama Train Museum" to draw tourists back in 2021. Modifications and rebuilds of Kishi station have incorporated cat motifs. Idakiso Station, also run by Wakayama Electric Railway, has appointed its own station master cats, but does not advertise them in the same way. Tama set an example of the value of animal stationmasters, and copycats included not just cats, but dogs, rabbits, goats, foxes, and lobsters.

The narratives behind Tama and Sanjuro became popular in part because they were associated with the site before being adopted as mascots. The existing presence of known stray cat populations, who are considered community cats, also attracts tourists. Cat islands in Japan such as Tashirojima have used the presence of their stray cat populations to attract tourists. Onomichi City has used cats to attract tourists, including through its "cat alley". This has raised questions relating to both the health of these stray cats, and implications for human health due to the facilitated growth of large stray populations.

== See also ==
- Cultural depictions of cats
- Working cat
