= Sanjuro (cat) =

Japanese cat in Takahashi, Okayama

Sanjūrō
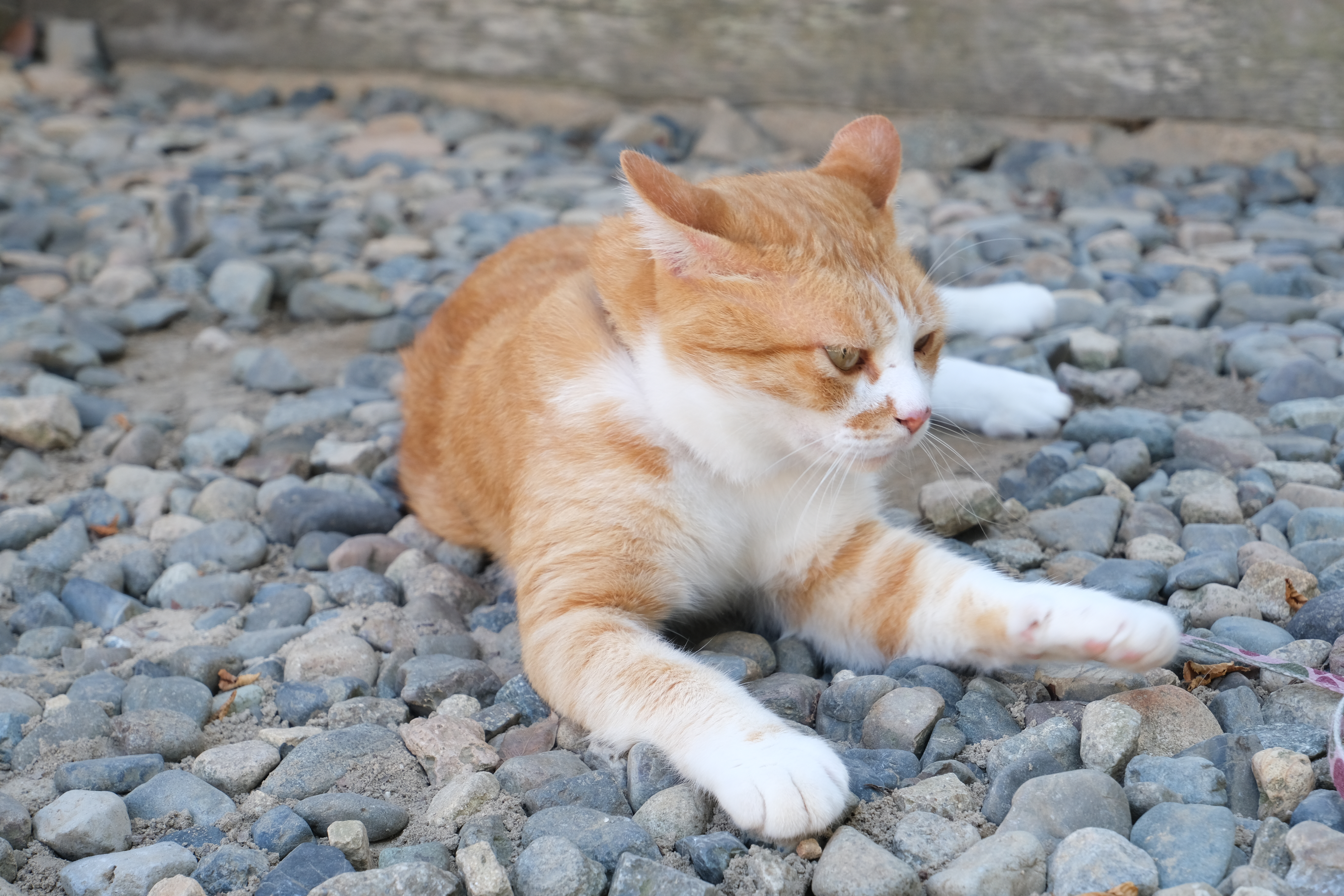
- Sanjuro in 2025

Cat Lord of Bitchu Matsuyama Castle
- Incumbent
- Assumed office December 16, 2018

Personal details
- Awards: Services to Okayama tourism

Sanjūrō (さんじゅーろー) is an orange and white male cat who serves as the lord of Bitchū Matsuyama Castle in Takahashi, Okayama, Japan. He was discovered on the castle grounds following the 2018 Japan floods. His friendliness toward staff and guests led to his formal adoption as lord of the castle on December 16, 2018. His presence increased tourism to the castle, and he has been used to draw tourists to Takahashi as a whole.

== Discovery and appointment ==
During the 2018 Japan floods, significant damage occurred in Takahashi, Okayama, including to the road approaching the heritage tourism site Bitchū Matsuyama Castle. The damage forced the castle to close, and after it reopened on July 18, there were significantly fewer visitors. This followed what was already a slower year in 2017 compared to preceding years. Those same floods caused a three-year-old orange and white male domestic cat living in the city to go missing on July 14. He was found at the castle the next week and taken care of by a caretaker. The cat was friendly and chose to remain in the castle grounds, choosing to sleep in the open despite one effort to build a shelter for it. At that time, tourism officials were discussing promoting the story of Sanjuro Tani, a local samurai from the Sengoku period, and the executive director of the tourism association managing the castle started referring to the cat as Sanjuro.

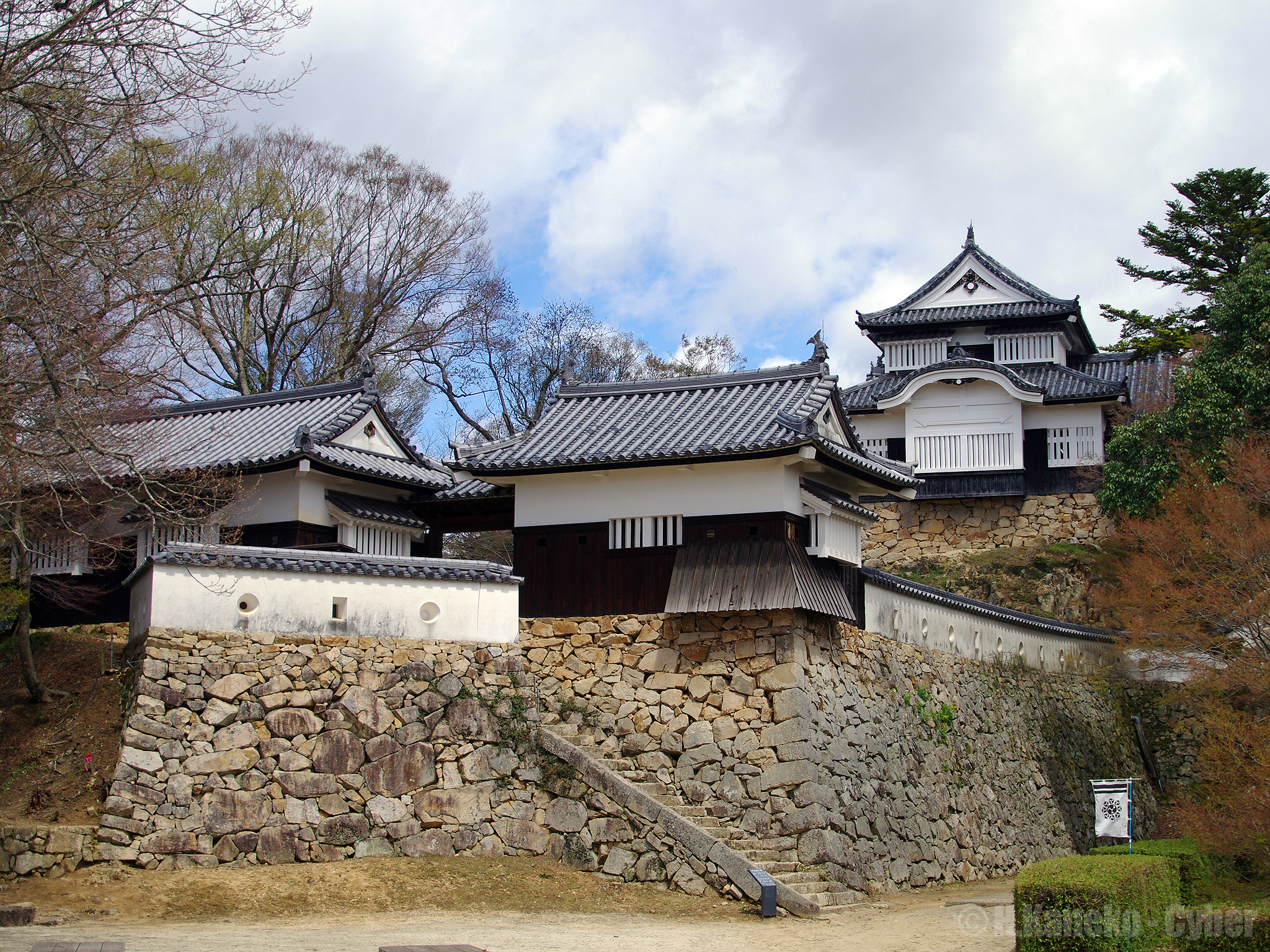
Bitchū Matsuyama Castle

When the castle reopened, the cat became famous for greeting visitors. His presence was spread through social media, and on October 10 he was featured in a local newspaper, in which he was referred to as the lord of the castle. Other newspapers and local television also picked up the story. Some visitors simply came to photograph the cat, without seeing the castle. Visitor numbers in October 2018 exceeded those of October 2017. At this time, other nearby tourist sites still had depressed visitor numbers compared to before the floods.

The former owner of Sanjuro, who had named him Natsume (なつめ), discovered his location in mid-October due to a friend seeing the cat on television. They had adopted him from a rescue organization on July 1, and had not been able to find him after he ran away during the storm. Their house was 6 kilometres (3.7 mi) from the castle. After visiting the castle, the former owner agreed to transfer ownership of the cat to the castle's management. Despite being regularly taken care of, Sanjuro would sometimes disappear for a couple of days. On November 4, Sanjuro was taken to town for an interview and escaped. After appealing through flyers and television, a sighting came on November 12, and on November 23 Sanjuro appeared back near the house he had run away from. Following this, Sanjuro received vet checks and was neutered.

A meeting was held on December 5 to discuss the fate of Sanjuro, and it was agreed he could live inside the caretakers' area of the castle complex, which was not part of the proper castle buildings. He was given a leash that caretakers would use to walk him around the castle. Sanjuro was officially given the title of lord of the castle by the local tourism association on December 16, 2018. A public ceremony was held in which Sanjuro walked along a red carpet while wearing a hakama. In 2020, Sanjuro was given an award by Okayama Prefectural Tourism Federation for services to tourism.

== Impact ==
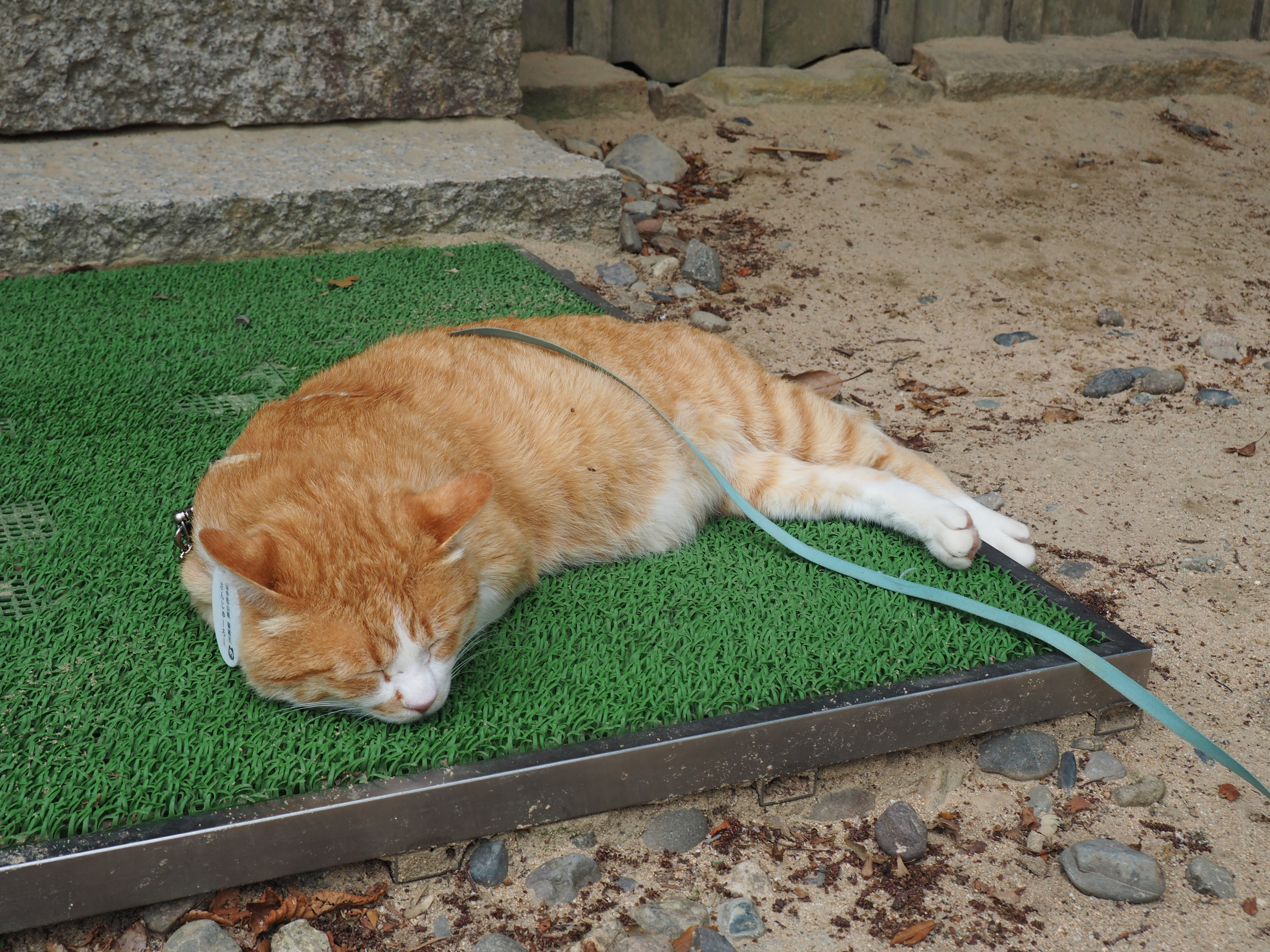
Sanjuro resting in 2019

Sanjuro's friendliness with visitors, film crews, and paparazzi has contributed to visitor numbers to the castle increasing beyond what they were before the 2018 floods. He is used in tourism advertising by the city of Takahashi. Sanjuro merchandise was first sold at the castle on February 10, 2019. A book telling the story of his adoption as castle lord was released later that year. The city has issued motorcycle license plates featuring a drawing of Sanjuro by a local student. He has been used to advertise local tea. A cat motif bench has been installed at the castle.

That Sanjuro found his way to the castle himself, rather than being put there, played an important role in his use as a tourist draw. In this sense Sanjuro is an example of the precedent set by Tama, whose appointment as station master of Kishi Station led to a series of copycat animal mascots, as well as an example of the wider trend of nekonomics. Cats are generally considered kawaii (cute), and Sanjuro is an example of the use of cuteness to add additional tourist attraction to historical areas. Sanjuro is officially cared for by the city's tourism association, and lives in the caretakers' area. He is walked on a leash when the castle is open for visitors, usually twice a day. Tourists are not allowed to feed him. March 16 has been declared "Sanjuro Day". Sanjuro is 50 centimetres (20 in) long, not including his 27 centimetres (11 in) tail.

== See also ==
- List of individual cats
- Tama (cat)
- Nekonomics
