= Sanjuro (disambiguation) =

Sanjuro is a 1962 Japanese film.

Sanjuro may also refer to:

- Tomonaga Sanjūrō (朝永 三十郎; 1871–1951), Japanese academic and esteemed professor emeritus
- Kuwabatake Sanjuro, a fictional character from films by Akira Kurosawa
- Sanjuro, a character in the .hack franchise
- "Sanjuro", a song by Denzel Curry from the 2022 album Melt My Eyez See Your Future
- Sanjuro (cat), a cat serving as the lord of Bitchū Matsuyama Castle
- Sanjuro (martial art), a hybrid martial art
