= South Western Railway zone =

One among eighteen administrative zones of Indian Railways

South Western Railway

Overview
- Headquarters: Rail Soudha, Gadag Road Hubli Karnataka
- Locale: Karnataka, Andhra Pradesh, Goa, Tamil Nadu and Maharashtra
- Dates of operation: 2003; 23 years ago–
- Predecessor: Southern Railway zone South Central Railway zone Central Railway zone

Technical
- Track gauge: Broad gauge (1676mm, 5'6")
- Previous gauge: Meter gauge
- Electrification: 3,329 kilometres (2,069 mi)
- Length: 3,721 kilometres (2,312 mi)

Other
- Website: www.swr.indianrailways.gov.in SWR Official Website

The South Western Railway (abbreviated SWR) is one of the 19 railway zones of Indian Railways, headquartered at Hubli in the Indian state of Karnataka. SWR was created from carving out the routes from Southern Railways, South Central Railways and Central Railways in 2003.

== History ==
The South Western Railway zone came into existence on 3 April 2003 by bifurcating Mysore and Bengaluru divisions from Southern Railway along with Hubli division from South Central Railway. It is headquartered at Hubli and comprises three divisions namely Hubli, Mysore, and Bengaluru. The fourth division at Kalaburagi was slated to be the fourth division which was supposed to be carved out from Hubli, Secunderabad, Guntkal and Solapur divisions. Currently the divisional office at Kalaburagi is on hold due to operational constraints.

With effect from 1 October 2026, the Railway lines of Mangalore area was merged with the Mysore railway division of South Western Railway (SWR) to facilitate more efficient administrative management.

== Zonal Headquarters ==
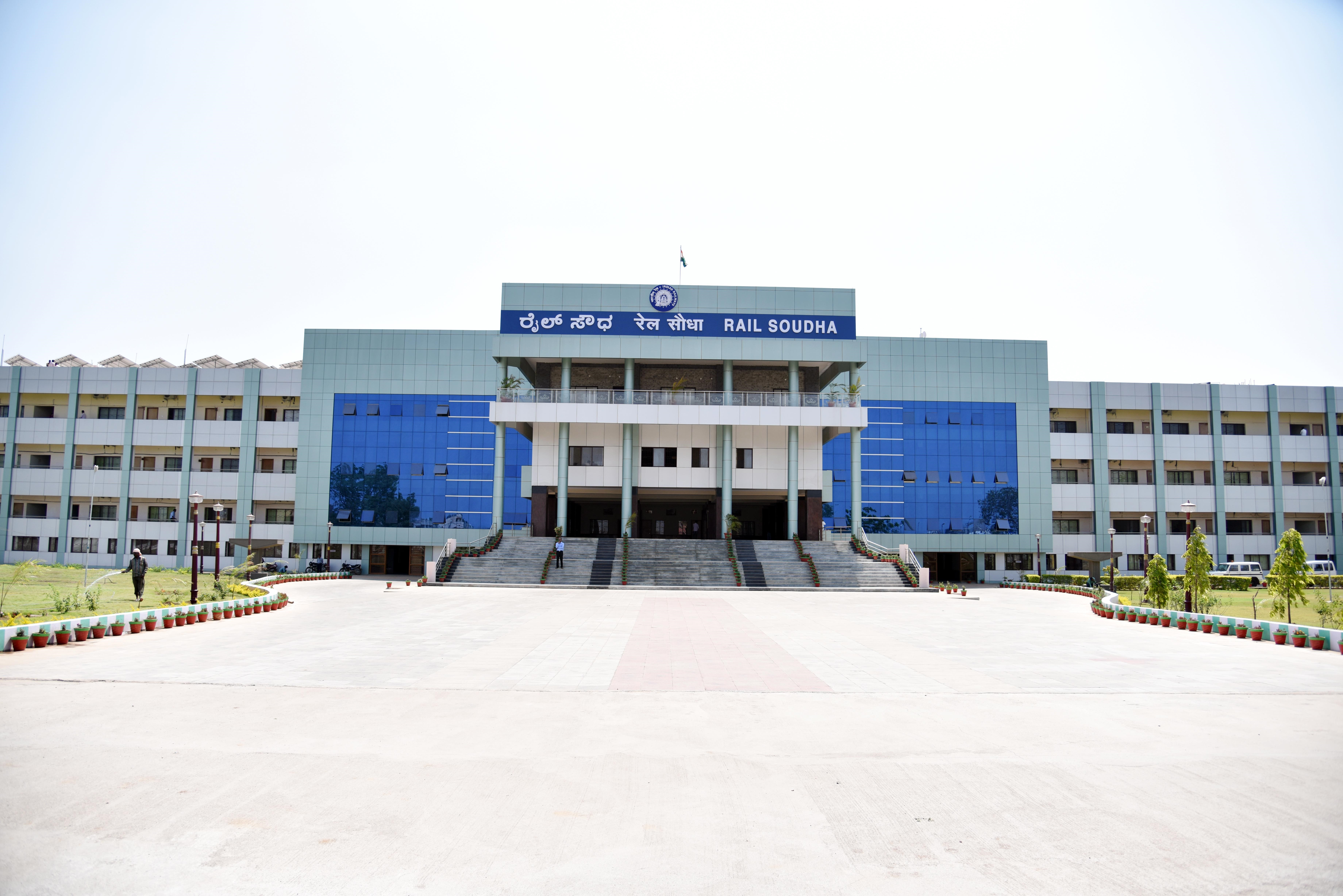
Rail Soudha, SWR Headquarters Office, Hubli

The headquarters of South Western Railway (SWR) is located at Rail Soudha, Gadag Road, Hubli, Karnataka – 580020, India. The zone has been headquartered at Hubli since its formation on 1 April 2003.

== Divisions ==
South Western Railway (SWR) is administratively divided into three railway divisions

- Bengaluru railway division
- Mysore railway division
- Hubli railway division
- Kalaburagi railway division (proposed)

Division wise Track detailsAs on 1 April 2026
| Sl. No. | Division | Route Kms | % of Route Kms | Running track Kms | % of Running track Kms |
|---|---|---|---|---|---|
| 1 | Bengaluru | 1144.98 | 30.76% | 1707.31 | 30.99% |
| 2 | Mysore | 1141.78 | 30.67% | 1468.33 | 26.65% |
| 3 | Hubli | 1434.91 | 38.55% | 2333.12 | 42.35% |
| Grand Total | | 3721.63 | 100% | 5508.78 | 100% |

== Administrative reorganisation ==
Mangaluru Area

With effect from 1 October 2026, the Railway lines of Mangaluru area was merged with the Mysore railway division of South Western Railway (SWR) to facilitate more efficient administrative management. The Government of India issued the related Gazette notification on 21 August 2026,outlining the changes to the railway administrative jurisdiction.

Railway Board NOTIFICATION

New Delhi, 21 August 2026

No. 2025/E&R/1(3)/1.

1. It is hereby notified for general information that keeping in view the operational requirements, Central Government has decided to revise the jurisdictional boundaries of Mysore division of South Western Railway, Konkan Railway and Palakkad division of Southern Railway.

2. The divisional/zonal boundary between Mysore division of South Western Railway and Palakkad division of Southern Railway is now fixed at Km 872.900 on Shoranur Jn.- Mangaluru Central section.

3. The existing divisional/zonal boundary between Konkan Railway and Southern Railway will become the divisional/zonal boundary between Konkan Railway and South Western Railway.

4. The interchange point between Mysore division of South Western Railway and Palakkad division of Southern Railway will accordingly shift from Padil to Ullal.

5. The existing interchange point between Palakkad division of Southern Railway and Konkan Railway at Thokur will now be the interchange point between Konkan Railway and Mysore division of South Western Railway.

6. These changes in the above jurisdiction will come into effect from 1 Oct.’ 2026.

== Jurisdiction ==
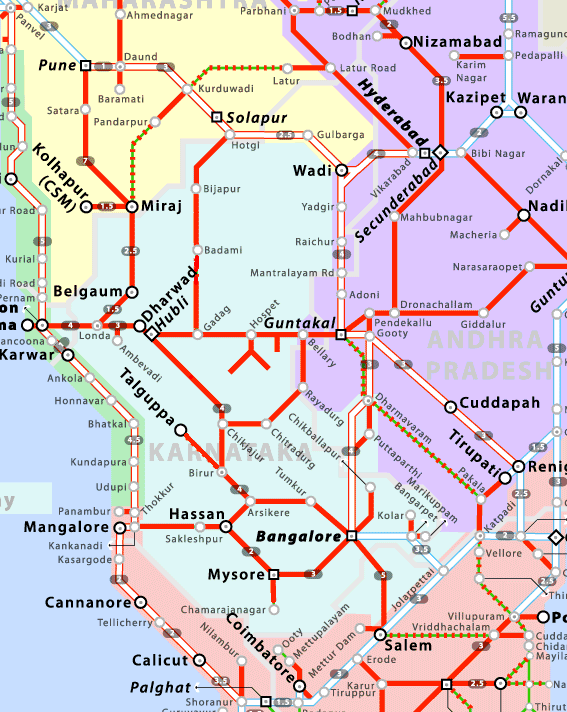
Map of South Western Railway zone (in Cyan)

South Western Railway covers most of the railway lines in the state of Karnataka and Goa except the Konkan Railway line, parts of Sri Sathya Sai district and Chittoor district in Andhra Pradesh, Krishnagiri district, parts of Dharmapuri district and Tirupathur district of Tamil Nadu and parts of Sangli district and Solapur district of Maharashtra. SWR also operates and maintains Mangalore–Hassan–Mysore line railway track.

== Modernization ==
The Mysore Division of South Western Railways will be designated as "Digital Division" after fully adopting its current technology harnessing programme. Two web-based helplines have been launched so that digitised information can be shared among different officials. The inspection reports regarding maintenance, passenger amenities, cleanliness, electronics, and communication, etc. will be managed by a new software which is under construction now. These measures will cut down redundant works, reduce number of registers and reports maintained by officials, reduce paper consumption and improve the efficiency and celerity of operations.

In 2025 SWR has enhanced speed on 835 kilometres of track, which saves up to an hour in travelling time for both people and goods. This has resulted in better logistics, more punctuality, and economic growth.

== Loco sheds ==
- Diesel & Electric Loco Shed, Krishnarajapuram(KJM)
- Diesel Loco Shed, Hubli(UBL)
- MEMU Shed, Banaswadi(BAND)
- DEMU Shed, Bengaluru Cantonment (BNC)
- MEMU & DEMU Shed, Hubli(UBL)

== Pitlines and coaching facilities ==
South Western Railway has 26 active pit lines across its three divisions, with 2 additional pit lines under construction and 1 pit line sanctioned, supporting the examination, servicing, and maintenance of train rakes.

Pit lines of South Western Railway
| Division | Location | Number of Pit lines |
|---|---|---|
| Bengaluru | KSR Bengaluru | 5 |
| Bengaluru | Yesvantpur | 4 |
| Bengaluru | Baiyyappanahalli / SMVT Bengaluru | 3 |
| Mysore | Mysore | 4 |
| Mysore | Mangaluru Central | 3 |
| Mysore | Arsikere | 1 |
| Mysore | Shivamogga / Kotegangur | 2 (Under Construction) |
| Hubli | Hubli | 4 |
| Hubli | Vasco da Gama | 1 |
| Hubli | Belagavi | 1 |
| Hubli | Vijayapura | 1 (Sanctioned) |
| Total | | 29 |

== State wise Route and Running track Kms ==
SWR route kilometres by state, as on 1 April 2026
1. Karnataka – 3,142.88 km (84.4%)
2. Andhra Pradesh – 298.41 km (8.01%)
3. Tamil Nadu – 173.67 km (4.66%)
4. Goa – 69.31 km (1.86%)
5. Maharashtra – 37.42 km (1.00%)

SWR Route and Running Track kilometres by StateAs on 01.April.2026
| Sl. No. | State | Route Kms | % of Route Kms | Running Track Kms | % of Running Track Kms |
|---|---|---|---|---|---|
| 1 | Karnataka | 3,142.88 | 84.44% | 4,720.69 | 85.69% |
| 2 | Andhra Pradesh | 298.41 | 8.01% | 419.02 | 7.61% |
| 3 | Tamil Nadu | 173.67 | 4.66% | 198.64 | 3.61% |
| 4 | Goa | 69.31 | 1.86% | 95.57 | 1.73% |
| 5 | Maharashtra | 37.42 | 1.00% | 74.84 | 1.36% |
| Grand Total | | 3,721.63 | 100.00% | 5,508.78 | 100.00% |

== Revenue ==
Financial Year (FY) wise Earnings (₹ crore)
| Service Head | 2022–23 | 2023–24 | 2024–25 | 2025–26 |
|---|---|---|---|---|
| Passenger | 2116.14 | 2388.39 | 2436.54 | 2670.41 |
| Other Coaching | 270.25 | 325.31 | 349.39 | 359.47 |
| Goods | 4202.20 | 4553.09 | 4377.80 | 4843.94 |
| Sundries | 364.43 | 404.36 | 301.27 | 351.46 |
| TOTAL | 6953.02 | 7671.16 | 7465.10 | 8225.28 |

== See also ==
- Zones and divisions of Indian Railways
- All India Station Masters' Association (AISMA)
- Konkan Railway Corporation
