= Itakiso shrine =

Shinto shrine in Wakayama, Japan

Itakiso Shrine 伊太祁󠄀曽神社
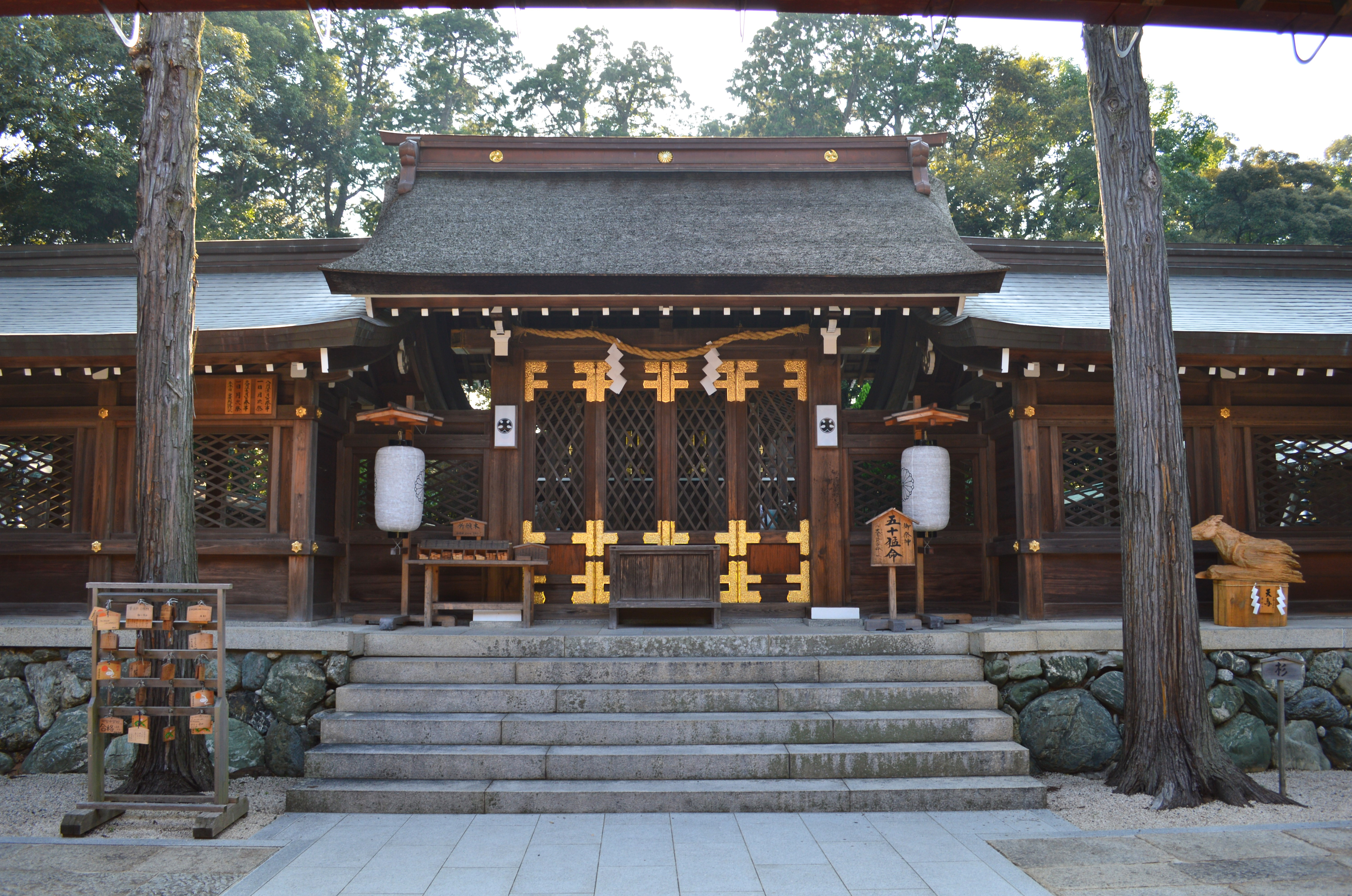
- Haisho of Itakiso Shrine

- Itakiso Shrine Itakiso shrine (Japan)

Religion
- Affiliation: Shinto
- Deity: Isotakeru
- Festival: October 15

Location
- Location: 558 Idakiso, Wakayama-shi, Wakayama-ken, Japan
- Interactive map of Itakiso Shrine 伊太祁󠄀曽神社
- Coordinates: 34°12′6.1″N 135°15′0″E

Architecture
- Established: pre-Nara period

Website
- Official website

Itakiso Shrine (伊太祁曽神社) is a Shinto shrine in the Itakiso neighborhood of the city of Wakayama in Wakayama Prefecture, Japan. It is one of the three shrines claiming the title of ichinomiya of former Kii Province. The main festival of the shrine is held annually on October 15.

== Enshrined kami ==
The kami enshrined at Itakiso Jinja are:

- Isotakeru-no-kami (五十猛神), the son of Susanoo and the god of forests and forestry
- Oyatsuhime no Mikoto (大屋都比賣命), younger sister of Isotakeru, goddess of horticulture
- Tsumatsuhime no Mikoto (都麻津比賣命), younger sister of Isotakeru, goddess of lumber and construction

== History ==
The origins of Itakiso Jinja are unknown. It first appears in the documentary record in an entry in the Shoku Nihongi dated 702 AD under Emperor Monmu. The shrine was originally located on what is the site of Hinokuma Shrine but during the reign of Emperor Suinin was relocated to a place called "Anomori" near its current location, and then relocated again to its present site in 713. According to the Nihon Shoki, Susanoo and his son Isotakeru had been driven out of the land of Takamagahara and had landed in Silla. However, they did not like that land, and travelled by boat to Izumo. There, Susanoo handed over the seeds of the tree he had brought from Takamagahara to Isotakeru and ordered him to sow the seeds all over Japan. Isotakeru, along with his younger sisters Oyatsuhime and Tsutomuhime, began to sow seeds all over Japan, turning the entire country into forests, finally arriving in the "country of trees", or Kii Province. In the early Heian period Engishiki record, the Itakiso Jinja is listed as a Myojin Taisha (名神大社) and is called the ichinomiya of the province.

The shine is listed in the Engishiki dated 927 AD as a shrine of the highest rank, and is stated to be the ichinomiya of Kii Province. From the Muromachi period, the shrine developed a close relationship with Negoro-ji and the Shingi-SHingon sect of Buddhism. Following the Meiji restoration, it was listed as a National Shrine, 2nd rank (国幣中社, Kokuhei Chūsha) under the Modern system of ranked Shinto shrines of State Shinto in 1885. It was promoted to an Imperial Shrine, 2nd rank (官幣中社, kanpei-chūsha) in 1918.

The shrine is located a five-minute walk from Idakiso Station on the Wakayama Electric Railway Kishigawa Line.

== Gallery ==
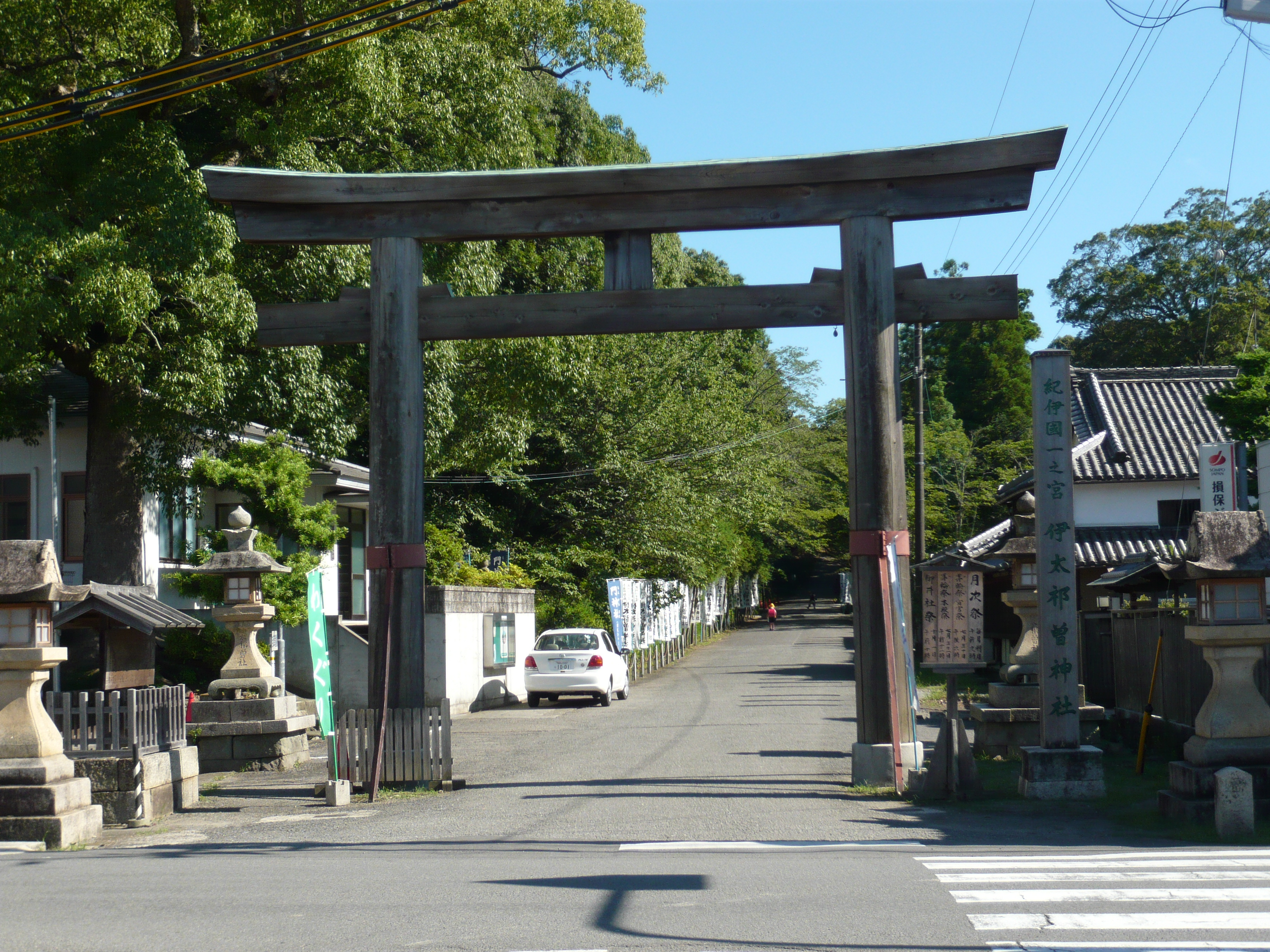
Torii approach to the shrine

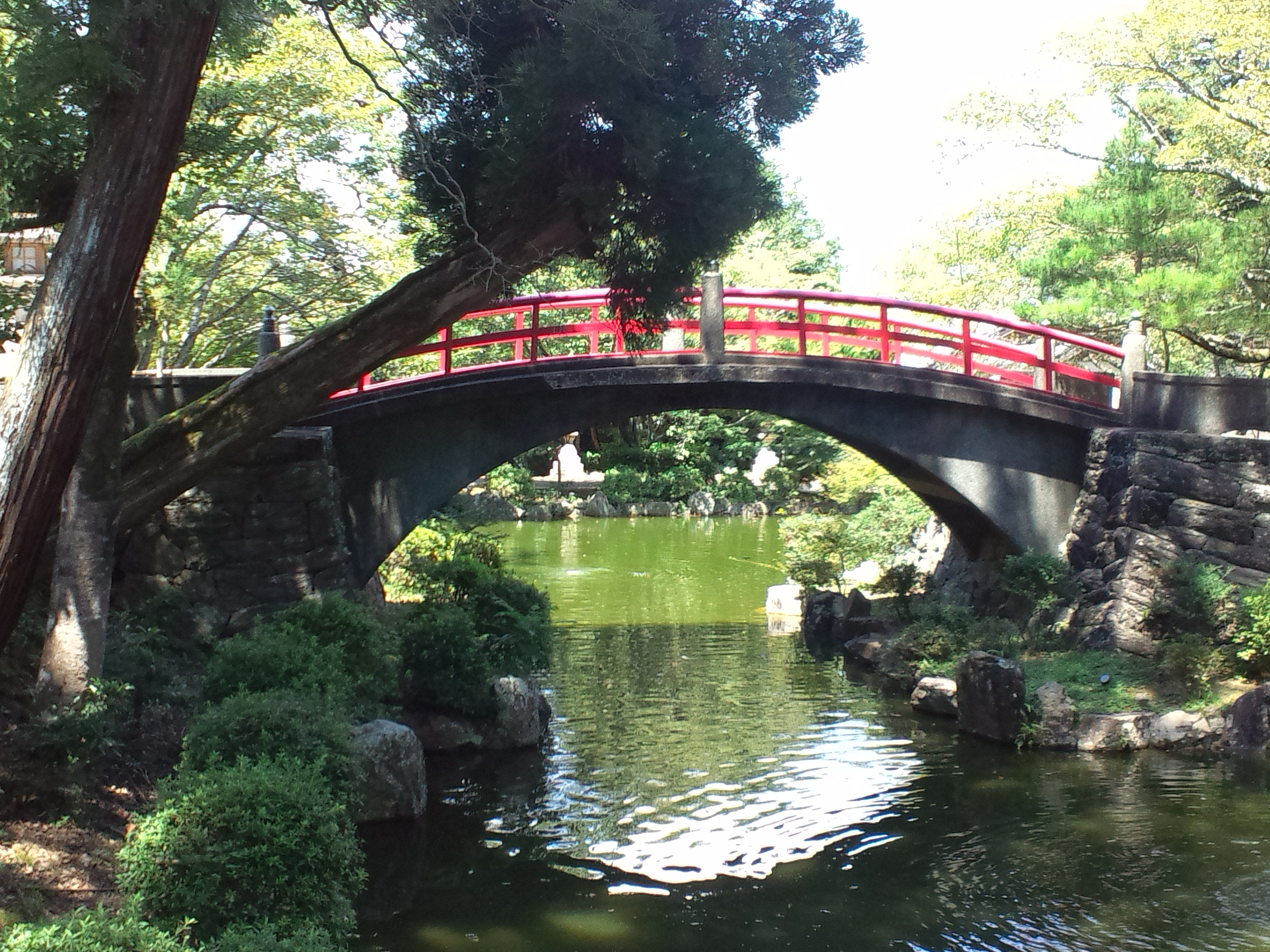
Taiko-bashi

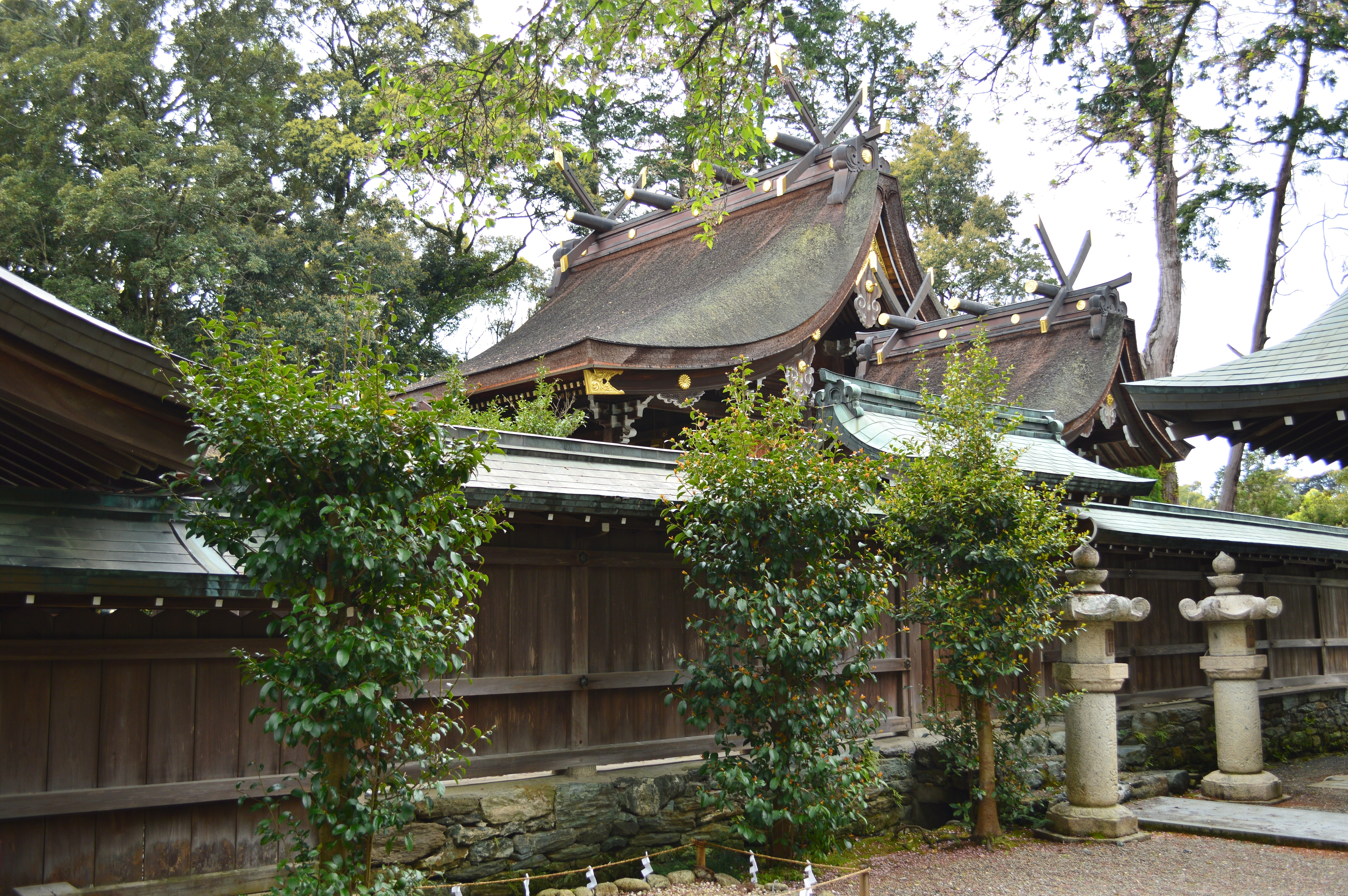
Honden

== See also ==
- Ichinomiya
- List of Shinto shrines
