= Idakiso Station =

Railway station in Wakayama, Wakayama Prefecture, Japan

Idakiso Station 伊太祈曽駅
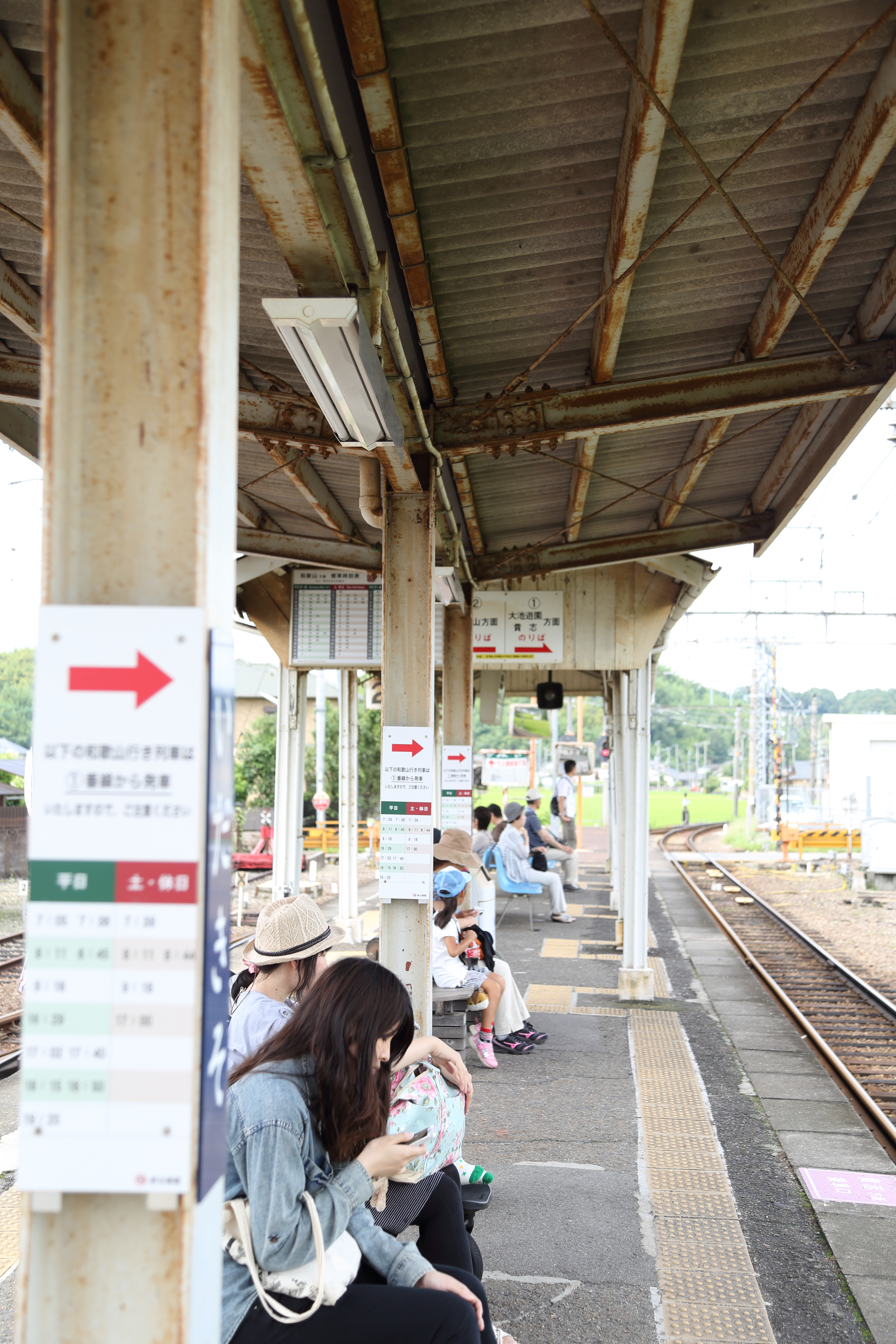
- Idakiso Station

General information
- Location: Idakiso, Wakayama-shi, Wakayama-ken 640-0361; Japan
- Coordinates: 34.2041°N 135.2516°E
- Operator: Wakayama Electric Railway
- Line: ■ Kishigawa Line
- Distance: 8.0 km from Wakayama
- Platforms: 1 island platform

Construction
- Structure type: At-grade

Other information
- Status: Staffed
- Station code: 09

History
- Opened: 15 February 1916

Passengers
- FY2017: 808 per day
Location
- Location within Wakayama Prefecture Location within Japan

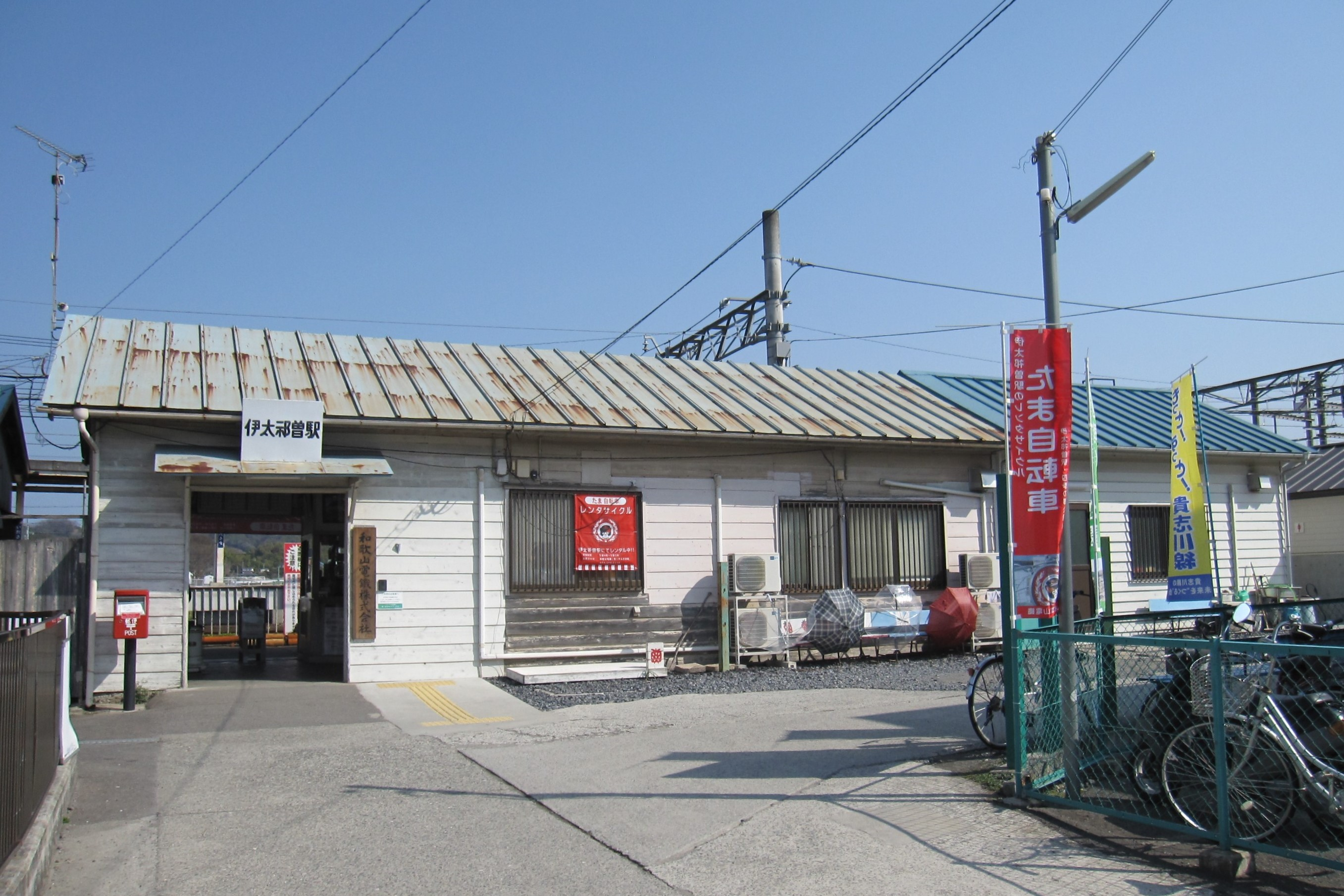
Idakiso Station, March 2012

Idakiso Station (伊太祈曽駅, Idakiso eki) is a passenger railway station in located in the city of Wakayama, Wakayama Prefecture, Japan, operated by the private railway company Wakayama Electric Railway.

== Lines ==
Idakiso Station is served by the Kishigawa Line, and is located 8.0 kilometers from the terminus of the line at Wakayama Station.

== Station layout ==
The station consists of one island platform connected to the station building by a level crossing. The station is staffed.

== Adjacent stations ==
«	Service	»
Kishigawa Line
Kire	Local	Sandō

== History ==
Idakiso Station opened on February 15, 1916 as Sandō Station (山東駅) . It was renamed Idakiso Station (伊太祁曽駅) on August 18, 1933 after the nearby Shinto shrine. When the Kishigawa Line's ownership was transferred from Nankai Electric Railway to Wakayama Electric Railway in 2006, the station name was changed to its current name. The only difference between the two is the writing of the third kanji; the pronunciation remains the same. Some of the station's older signage retain the old writing format.

=== Stationmaster cat ===
In January 2007, Kishi Station, the eastern terminus of the Kishigawa Line, named a stray calico cat named Tama as the stationmaster. The cat quickly became the face of the franchise and caused a surge of tourism to the railway line. In February 2012, another stray cat, Tama II ("Nitama") was named Tama's apprentice, and was installed as Idakiso Station's stationmaster. Following Tama I's death in August 2015, Tama II was reassigned to Kishi Station. In January 2017, another stray cat named Tama IV ("Yontama") was named stationmaster at Idakiso Station. That lasted until November 2025 with the death of Tama II, when Tama IV was reassigned to Kishi full-time. Tama V ("Gotama") was assigned to Idakiso Station with Tama VI ("Rokutama") apprenticing both, replacing the off-day Tama at the appropriate station.

== Passenger statistics ==
Ridership per day
Year	Ridership
2011	623
2012	618
2013	656
2014	653
2015	872
2016	825
2017	808

== Surrounding Area ==
- Wakayama Electric Railway Headquarters
- Idakiso Depot
- Itakiso Shrine

== See also ==
- List of railway stations in Japan
