= All India Station Masters' Association =

Indian trade union

- All India Station Masters' Association
- Founded: 1953
- Headquarters: New Delhi
- Location: India
- Members: 39,000
- Key people: Pramod Kumar of DDU Division (Central President), Sharad Chandra Purohit of Ajmer Division (Secretary General) & T Vinu of Palakkat Division (CSF)
- Website: www.aisma.in

The All India Station Masters' Association (AISMA) (Regd. No. NDD/09) is an Indian trade union representing the Station Masters of Indian Railways. Formed in 1953, it is among the best examples of work-category based unions in the Indian railway industry. AISMA represents Assistant Station Masters (ASMs), Station Masters (SMs), Station Managers (SMRs) and Transportation Inspectors (TIs), numbering to 37000.

Efforts of CEC Team include long pending demands such as minimum grade pay of Rs. 4200, and maximum GP 5400, Uniform Allowance, Condonation of Break in Service of SWR are some of Milestones Achievements, in the Indian Railways Trade Unions.

On 6 January 2018, it proposed to conduct Eastern Maha Sammelan, under the impression "AISMA for Development".

In the Central Executives Meeting held at Bhubaneswar on 19,20 August 2017, the following Office Bearers were recognized for their meritorious service:

Sh.B.P. Kumarasamy GS SWR honoured with "Man of the CEC"

Sh. D. K. Arora GS CR and Sh. Pramod Kumar GS ECR shared the "Best GS" Award

Sh. Pankaj.Kr.Jhr GS SER honoured with "Best Upcoming GS"

Sh.Rajender. P. Ranakoti DS MB/NR honoured with "Best Divisional Secretary"

Facebook group created for instant messaging and as well for the audio visual news to its members.

== See also ==
- Indian Railways
