= Tama (cat) =

Calico cat and station master (1999–2015)

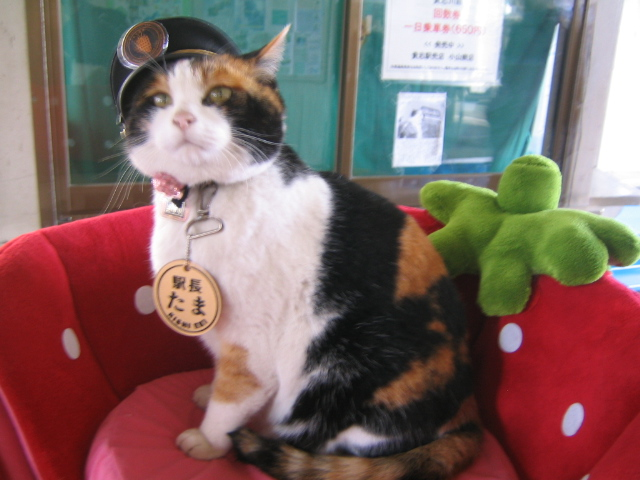
- Tama in February 2007, wearing her station master's hat
- Other name: たま
- Species: Cat (Felis catus)
- Sex: Female
- Born: April 29, 1999; Kinokawa, Wakayama Prefecture, Japan
- Died: June 22, 2015 (aged 16); Iwade, Wakayama Prefecture, Japan
- Nationality: Japan
- Occupation: Station master
- Notes Died of apparent heart failure

Tama (Japanese: たま; April 29, 1999 – June 22, 2015) was a female calico cat who gained fame for being a railway station master and operating officer at Kishi Station on the Kishigawa Line in Kinokawa, Wakayama Prefecture, Japan. She is credited with saving the station and line from closure. As of 2026, five successors, all female calicos, have inherited the Tama name and worked at the station.

== Early life ==
Tama was born in Kinokawa, Wakayama, and was raised with a group of stray cats that used to live close to Kishi Station. They were regularly fed by passengers and by Toshiko Koyama, the informal station manager at the time.

== Career ==
The station was near closure in 2004 because of financial problems on the rail line. Around this time, Koyama adopted Tama. Eventually the decision to close the station was withdrawn after the citizens demanded that it stay open. In April 2006, the newly formed Wakayama Electric Railway destaffed all stations on the Kishigawa Line to cut costs, and at the same time evicted the stray cats from their shelter to make way for new roads leading to the stations. Koyama pleaded with Mitsunobu Kojima, president of Wakayama Electric Railway, to allow the cats to live inside Kishi Station; Kojima, seeing Tama as a maneki-neko (beckoning cat), agreed to the request.

On January 5, 2007, railway officials officially awarded Tama the title of station master. As station master, her primary duty was to greet passengers.

In lieu of an annual salary, the railway provided Tama with a year's worth of cat food and a gold name tag for her collar stating her name and position. A station master's hat was specially designed and made to fit Tama, and took more than six months to complete. In July 2008, a summer hat was also issued to Tama for hotter weather. Tama's original gold name tag was stolen by a visitor on October 10, 2007, but a replica was quickly made to replace it.

The publicity from Tama's appointment led to an increase in passengers by 17% for that month as compared to January 2006; ridership statistics for March 2007 showed a 10% increase over the previous financial year. A study estimated that the publicity surrounding Tama has contributed 1.1 billion yen to the local economy. Tama is often cited as part of a phenomenon known in Japan as "Nekonomics" (ネコノミクス, nekonomikusu; lit., "catonomics", "cat economics"), which refers to the positive economic impact of having a cat mascot and is a play off the term Abenomics and "neko" – "cat".

On December 5, 2007, Tama was recognized as the grand prize winner of the railway's "Top Station Runner Award". The year-end bonus was modified to a special cat toy and a celebratory slice of crab, which Tama was fed by the company president.

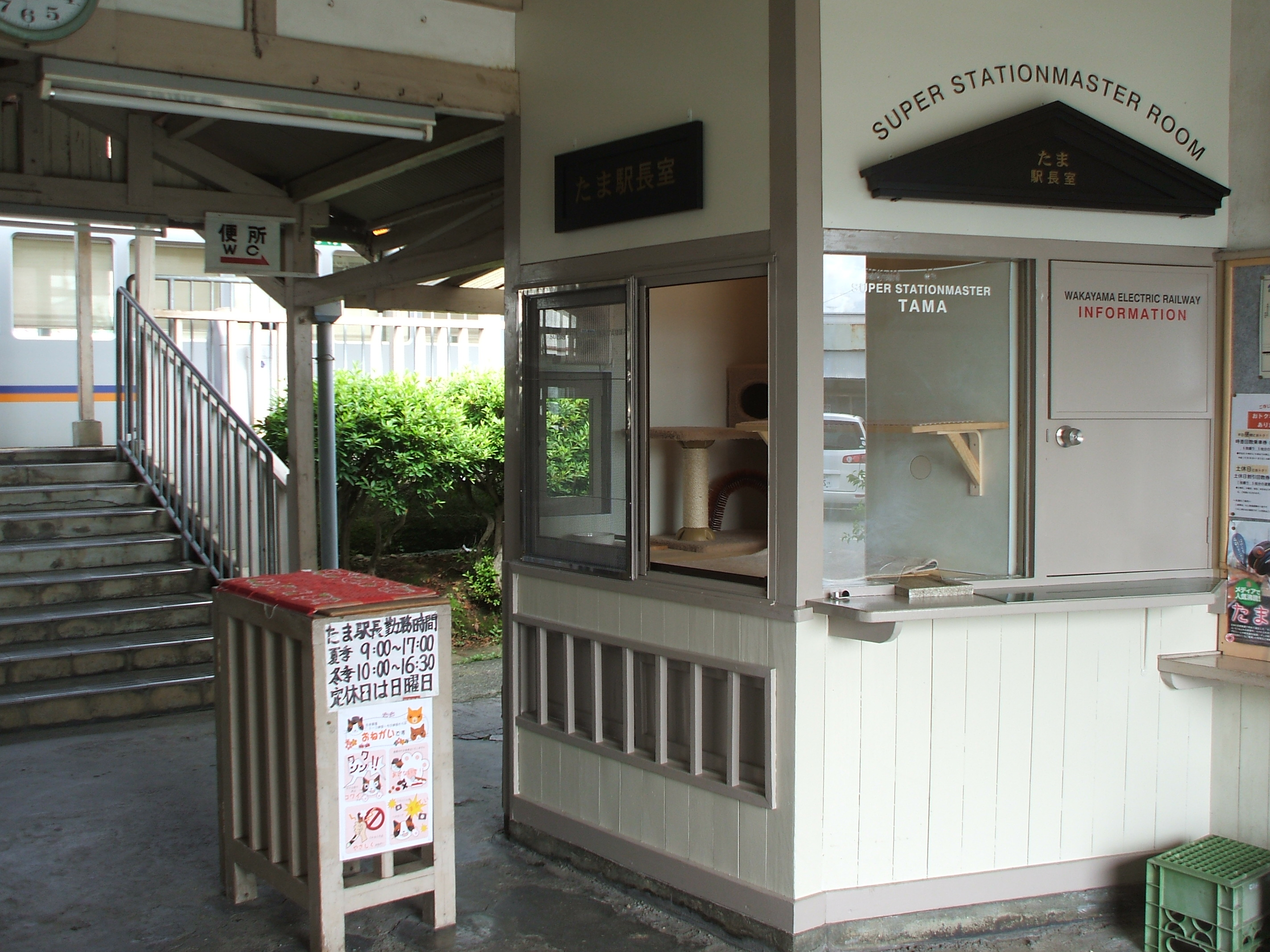
Tama's office inside the old Kishi Station in June 2008

On January 5, 2008, Tama was promoted to "super station master" (a title equivalent to Superintendent rank) in a ceremony attended by the president of the company, the mayor, and approximately 300 spectators. As a result of her promotion, she was "the only female in a managerial position" in the company. Her new position had an "office" — a converted ticket booth containing a litter box. Her gold name tag was modified to a gold tag with a blue background with an added "S" for "super", also corresponding to the highest grade in the Japanese grading system.

On October 28, 2008, Tama was knighted and awarded the title of "Wakayama de Knight" (a pun on "It's got to be Wakayama" in Japanese) by the prefectural governor, Yoshinobu Nisaka, for her work in promoting local tourism.

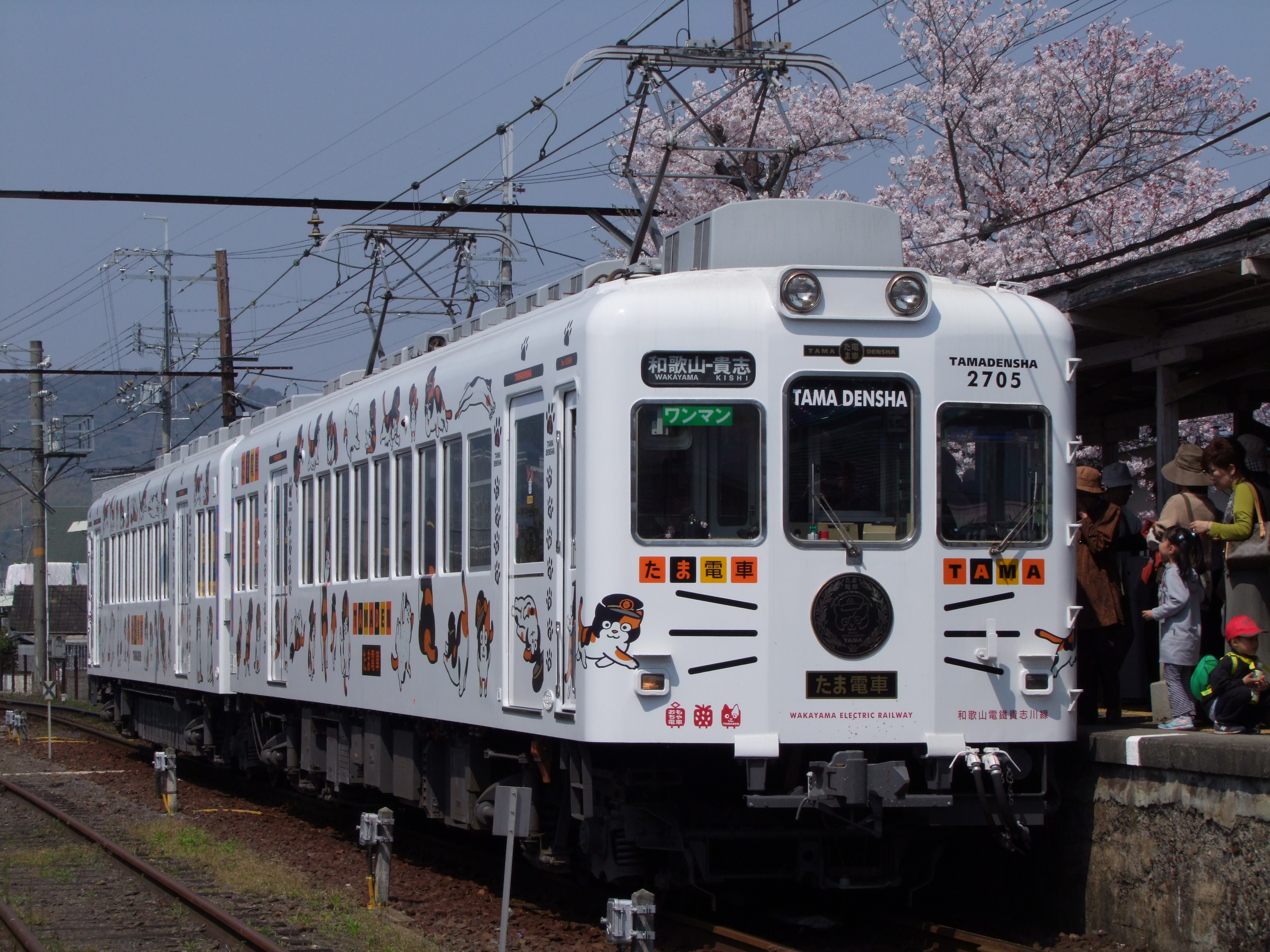
The "Tama Densha" train in April 2009

In early 2009, the Wakayama Electric Railway introduced a new "Tama train" (たま電車, Tama densha) train on the line which was customized with cartoon depictions of Tama.

In January 2010, railway officials promoted Tama to the post of "Operating Officer" in recognition of her contribution to expanding the customer base. Tama maintained the station master's job while taking over the new job, and was the first cat to become an executive of a railroad corporation.

Her staff consisted of two feline assistant stationmasters: Tama's sister, Chibi (ちび; born May 12, 2000), and Tama's mother, an orange tabby cat named Miiko (ミーコ; October 3, 1998 – July 20, 2009).

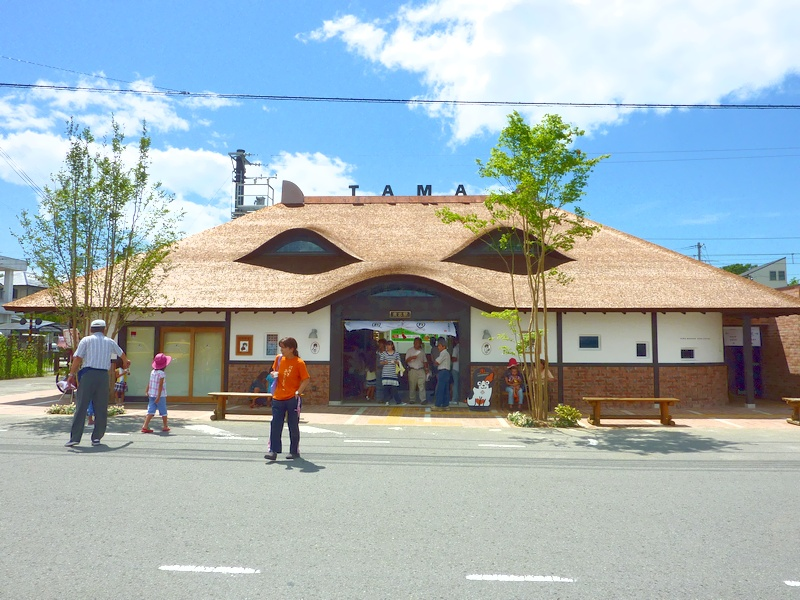
Kishi Station building, rebuilt to resemble a cat's face, August 2010

In August 2010, in honor of Tama's third year as stationmaster, the station building at Kishi was rebuilt with a new structure resembling a cat's face, the eyes being eyebrow dormers. Both the "Tama train" refurbishment and station rebuilding projects were overseen by industrial designer Eiji Mitooka.

On January 6, 2011, Tama's fourth year as stationmaster was celebrated with a ceremony and her promotion to "Managing Executive Officer", third in line after the company president and the managing director.

On January 5, 2013, at the ceremony celebrating her sixth year as stationmaster, Tama was elevated to Honorary President of Wakayama Electric Rail for life. In April 2013, it was announced that due to Tama's increasing age, her work hours would be reduced and she would only be on view in the station office Tuesday through Friday, a reduction of two days from her original Monday through Saturday hours.

== Death and enshrinement ==
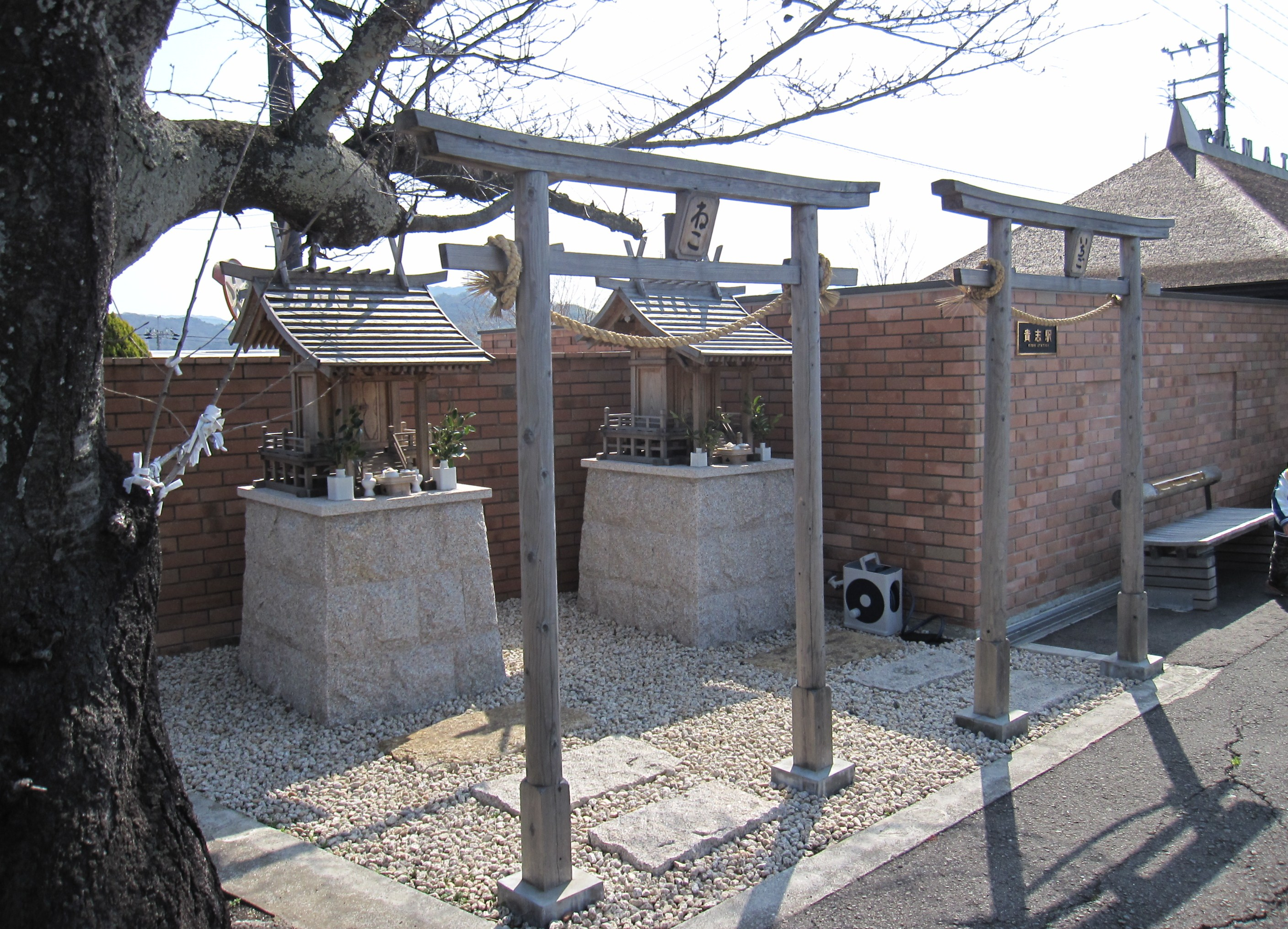
Shinto shrine next to Kishi Station where Tama I is enshrined

Tama I died on June 22, 2015, at the age of 16, of apparent heart failure at an animal hospital in Wakayama Prefecture. After she died, thousands of her fans from all over Japan came to pay their respects. She was honored with a Shinto-style funeral at the station and was given the posthumous title "Honorary Eternal Stationmaster".

She was enshrined at a nearby Shinto cat shrine as spirit goddess Tama Daimyōjin (たま大明神) on August 11, 2015. The "Tama train" was redecorated for mourning and the first ceremonial passengers were children from a local nursery school.

After the funeral, Wakayama Electric Railway President Mitsunobu Kojima and other executives went to the area by Kishi River where Tama I was born and selected stones to build her memorial. Tama I's name was written in calligraphy by President Kojima and carved by a stonemason. The plaque and a bronze statue of Tama I are located in a small Shinto shrine, called Tama Jinja, next to the station.

In February 2016, Tama I became the first inductee into the newly created Wakayama Hall of Fame and bronze relief plaque showing the story of her life was unveiled on the second floor of the Wakayama Prefectural Library.

Every year on June 23, the anniversary of Tama I's death, her successors are carried to her shrine and offerings are presented by the company president on their behalf.

== Wakayama Electric Railway cats ==
=== Miiko ===
Miiko (born October 1998) was Tama's biological mother who served as an assistant at Kishi Station. She was a fully-orange tabby cat. In July 2009, Miiko died at age 10.

=== Chibi ===
Chibi (born May 2000) was Tama's sister who served as an assistant at Kishi Station alongside Miiko. She could be easily distinguishable from Miiko; Chibi had a white breast, while Miiko did not.

Chibi disliked the spotlight, and her last appearance was in 2010.

== Later generations of Tama ==
=== Tama II ===
On January 5, 2012, Tama's official apprentice, named "Nitama" (lit. "Second Tama", Tama II) was revealed. Born in Okayama City in 2010, Tama II was rescued from under a train car and adopted by Okayama Electric Tramway. Tama II trained at Idakiso Station (five stops away on the same line as Kishi Station) before being chosen as Tama I's apprentice.

After the traditional fifty-day mourning period following the death of Tama I, Tama II took over. Tama II's first official duty was to be conveyed to her predecessor's shrine to pay her respects.

Tama II was a medium-hair calico cat and is easily distinguished from both Tama I and Tama IV in pictures by her coat length. She is often drawn as endearingly fluffy on promotional materials.

After Tama I's enshrinement in August 2015, Tama II was taken to the shrine to pay her respects and then formally installed as the new stationmaster.

On November 21, 2025, Tama II died at age 15.

=== Tama III ===
"Sun-tama-tama" (a pun on "Santama", lit. "third Tama", or Tama III) was a calico cat sent for training in Okayama. Sun-tama-tama was considered as a candidate for Tama's successor, but the Okayama Public Relations representative who had been caring for Sun-tama-tama refused to give the cat up, writing, "I will not let go of this child, she will stay in Okayama."

As of September 2018, Tama III is working as the stationmaster in Naka-ku, Okayama and appears occasionally on Tama's Twitter account.

=== Tama IV ===
On January 6, 2017, the 10th anniversary of Tama I's installment as stationmaster, Yontama (lit. "Fourth Tama," or Tama IV) (born April 17, 2016), was introduced as Tama II's subordinate and the new stationmaster of Idakiso Station, the station Tama II trained at, on Tama II's days off. Shortly after Tama II's death, on January 6, 2026, she was promoted, age 9 years and 8 months, to Station Master. As of September 2026, she has Wednesdays and Thursdays off (Tama VI replaces her those days) and is on shift at Kishi Station on other days.

=== Tama V ===
On January 7, 2025, Gotama (lit. "Fifth Tama", or Tama V) (born January 28, 2021), was introduced as a second subordinate to Tama II, who would work at Kishi Station and Idakiso Station. As of September 2026, she has Mondays and Fridays off (Tama VI replaces her those days), and is primarily on shift at Idakiso Station on other days.

=== Tama VI ===
On January 7, 2026, Rokutama (lit. "Sixth Tama", Tama VI) (born May 5, 2025), was announced as a new cat employee. As of September 2026, she is on shift at Idakiso Station (Mondays and Fridays when Tama V is off) and Kishi Station (Wednesdays and Thursdays when Tama IV is off), and has weekends and Tuesdays off.

== In popular media ==
Tama appeared in a documentary about cats titled La Voie du chat in French and Katzenlektionen in German by Italian filmmaker Myriam Tonelotto, broadcast on European TV channel ARTE in April 2009.

Tama is featured in the Animal Planet series Must Love Cats. The host, John Fulton, honored her with a visit and a song.

Tama made an appearance on Chris Tarrant: Extreme Railways in the episode entitled "The Great Japanese Train Ride", Chris Tarrant visits Kishi station, meets Tama I and explores the impact she has had on the local economy. Chris also meets Tama II.

On April 29, 2017, on what would have been her 18th birthday, Google honored Tama with a Google doodle.

In the 2017 documentary Cat Nation: A Film About Japan's Crazy Cat Culture Chris Broad explores the impact cats have on Japanese culture. He visits Kishi station, meets Tama II and looks at the lasting impact Tama had on the local population.

In chapter 58 of the Japanese manga Noragami, published a few months after her death and deification, the authors honored Tama with the "rookie of the year award" as a new goddess of fortune in an in-universe ranking of the most popular Shinto deities.

In Around The World By Train With Tony Robinson presenter Tony Robinson visits Kishi station and meets Tama II. Tony visits Tama's shrine and looks at the impact Tama's death had on the local population.

== Gallery ==
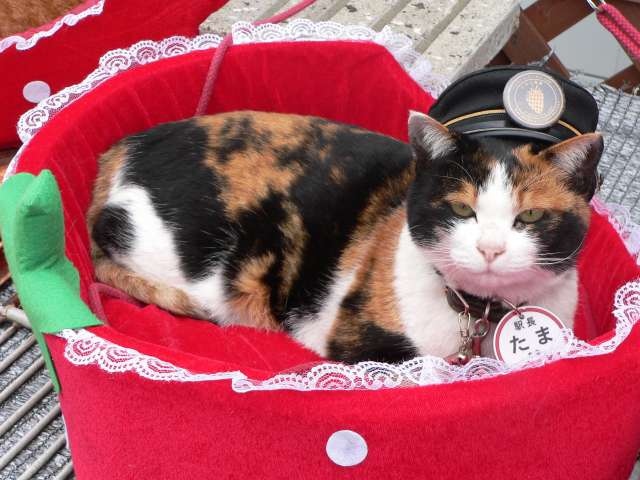
Tama on duty on November 11, 2007

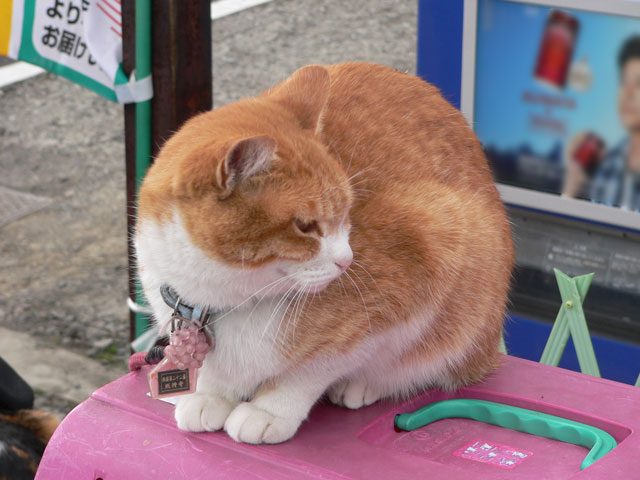
Assistant Chibi in November 2007

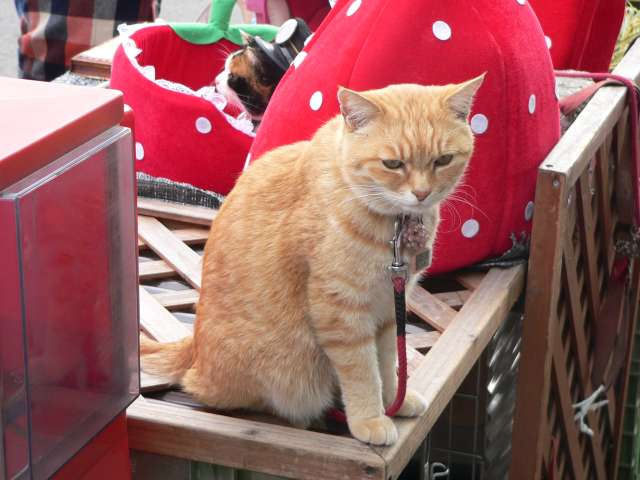
Assistant Miiko in November 2007

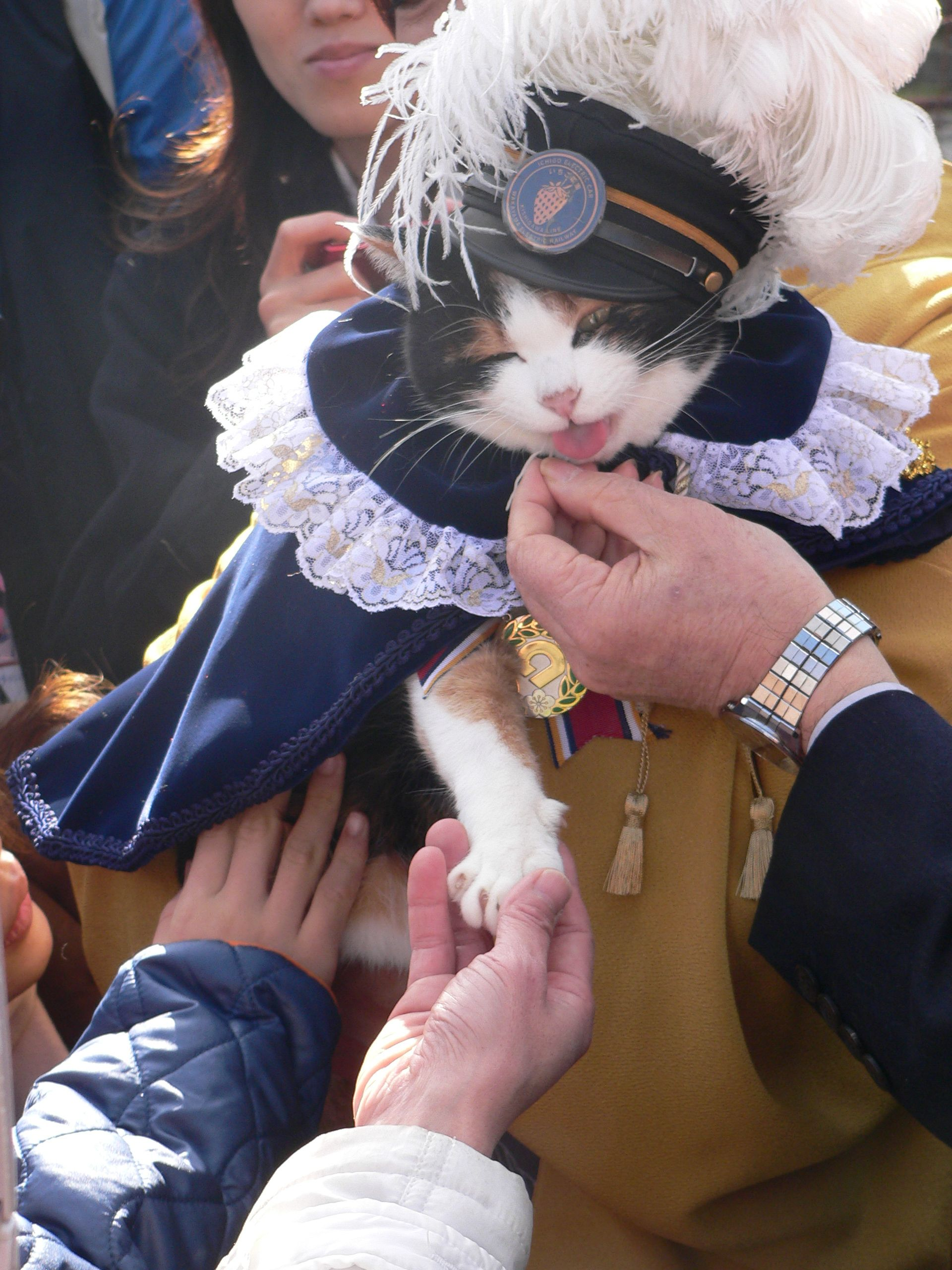
Tama wearing a decoration of "Wakayama de Knight" on January 4, 2009

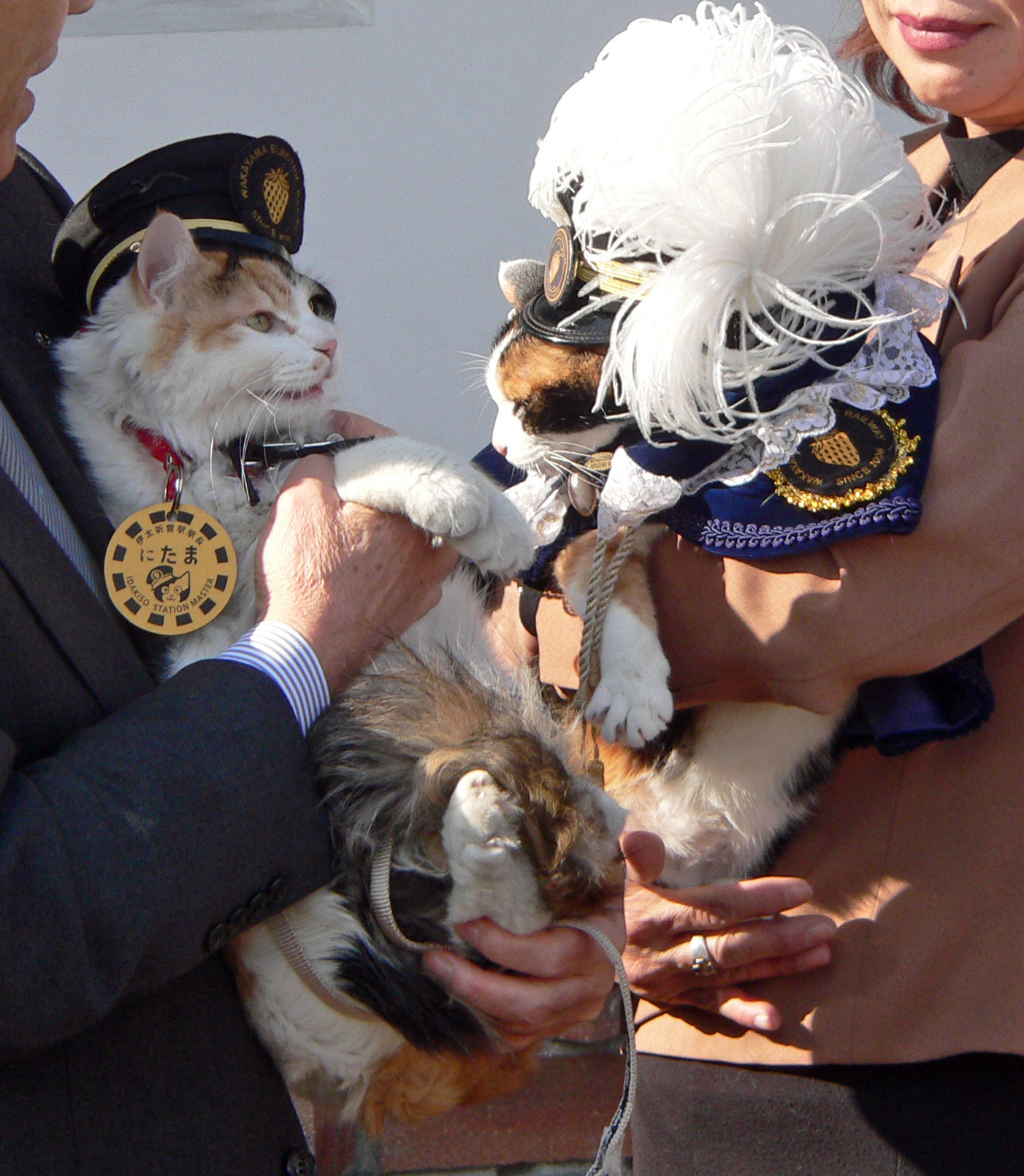
Tama II (left) and Tama (right) at announcement of Tama II's apprenticeship, January 5, 2011

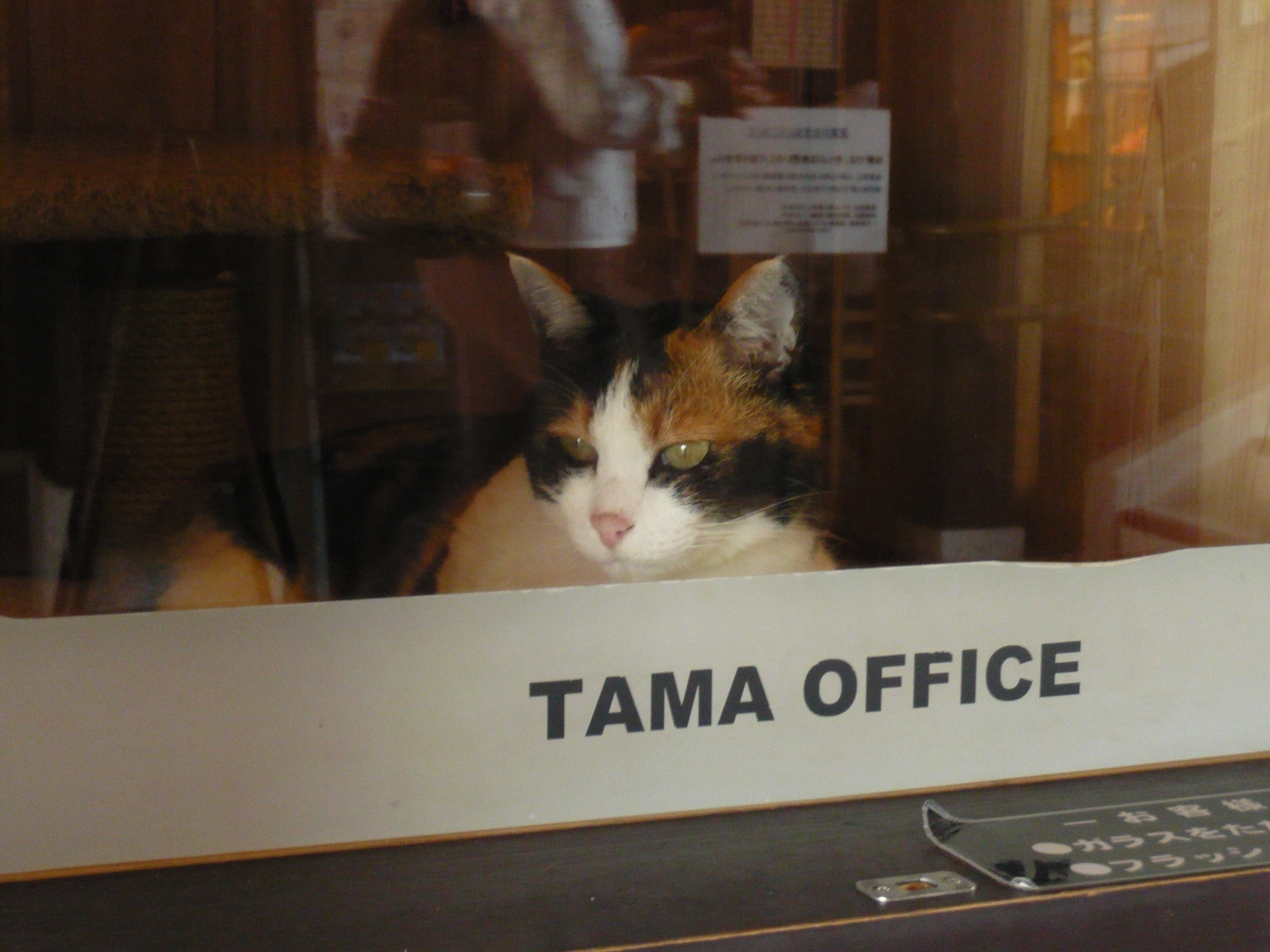
Tama on duty, July 2011

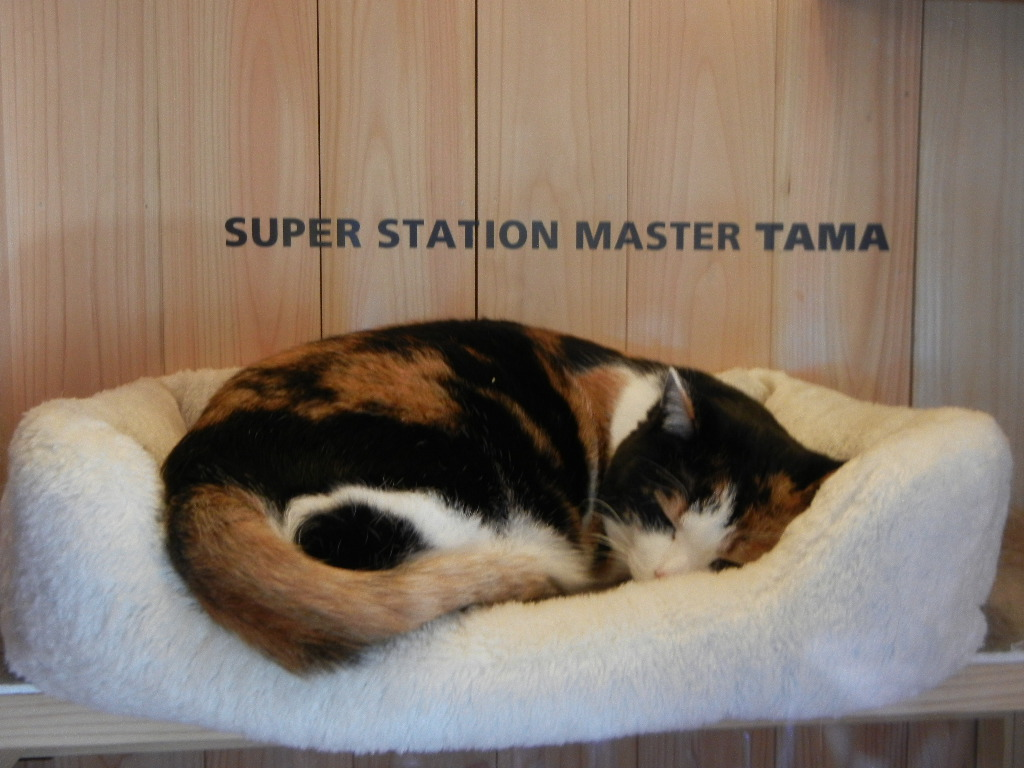
Tama napping in the new station office, February 2012

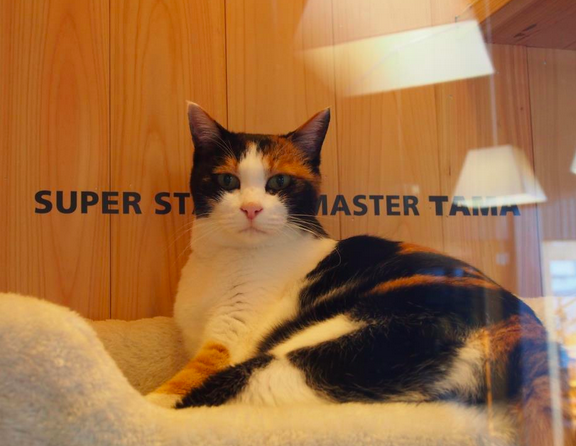
Tama on duty in the new station office, October 2012

== See also ==
- List of individual cats
- Stubbs, an American cat appointed honorary mayor of Talkeetna, Alaska
- Tibs the Great, British Post Office's "number one cat"
- Chief Mouser to the Cabinet Office, the title of the official resident cat of the prime minister of the United Kingdom at 10 Downing Street
- Palmerston (cat), resident Chief Mouser of the Foreign & Commonwealth Office
- Think Think and Ah Tsai, cats of the former president of Taiwan, Tsai Ing-wen
- Hermitage cats in Saint Petersburg, Russia
- Canadian Parliamentary Cats
- Chessie, the mascot of both the Chesapeake and Ohio and the Chessie System.
