= National Cat Day =

Day of celebration or awareness

- Observed by: Canada; Italy; Japan; Poland; Russia; Sweden; United Kingdom; United States
- Type: National
- Date: 8 August (Canada); 29 October (United States); 22 February (Japan); 1 March (Russia); 17 February (Italy, Brazil, Poland); 1 December (Sweden)
- Frequency: Annually

National Cat Day is celebrated in various countries. In some areas, it is an awareness day to raise public awareness of cat adoption.

== Italy ==
In Italy, National Cat Day is celebrated on 17 February. The date was chosen in 1990 after a vote by readers of Tuttogatto magazine.

== Japan ==
In Japan, National Cat Day is celebrated on 22 February, as the date resembles the words "nyan nyan nyan" (meow meow meow). The date was decided on in a poll between cat-keepers by the Executive Cat Day Committee in 1978. It is celebrated with people posing with photographs of themselves with their pet cats, and businesses selling cat-themed cuisine.

== Russia ==
In Russia, National Cat Day is celebrated on 1 March. In Russian culture, cats are considered symbols of spring, and March is also associated with cats.

== United Kingdom ==
In the United Kingdom, there is also a National Black Cat Day which is marked on 27 October. It was established in 2011 by animal welfare charity, Cats Protection, which found that black (and black-and-white cats) took around a week longer to find homes than cats of other colours. They attributed this to black cats' perceived connection with bad luck and the supernatural, and the fact that the cats do not photograph well on social media.

== United States ==
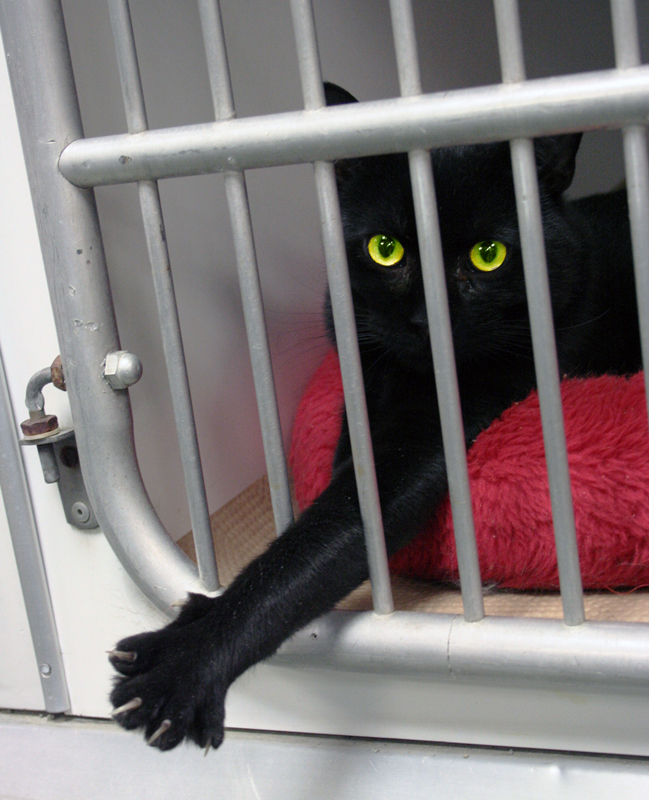
In the US and Canada, the day focuses on animal rescue

In the US, National Cat Day is an awareness day on 29 October each year, to raise public awareness of cat adoption.

The National Cat Day website states that the holiday was first celebrated in 2005 "to help galvanize the public to recognize the number of cats that need to be rescued each year and also to encourage cat lovers to celebrate the cat(s) in their life for the unconditional love and companionship they bestow upon us." The day was founded by Colleen Paige, a pet and family lifestyle expert, who was supported by the American Society for the Prevention of Cruelty to Animals, which is a nonprofit pet adoption organization.

== See also ==
- World Animal Day
