= Kishi Station (Wakayama) =

Railway station in Kinokawa, Wakayama Prefecture, Japan

Kishi Station 貴志駅
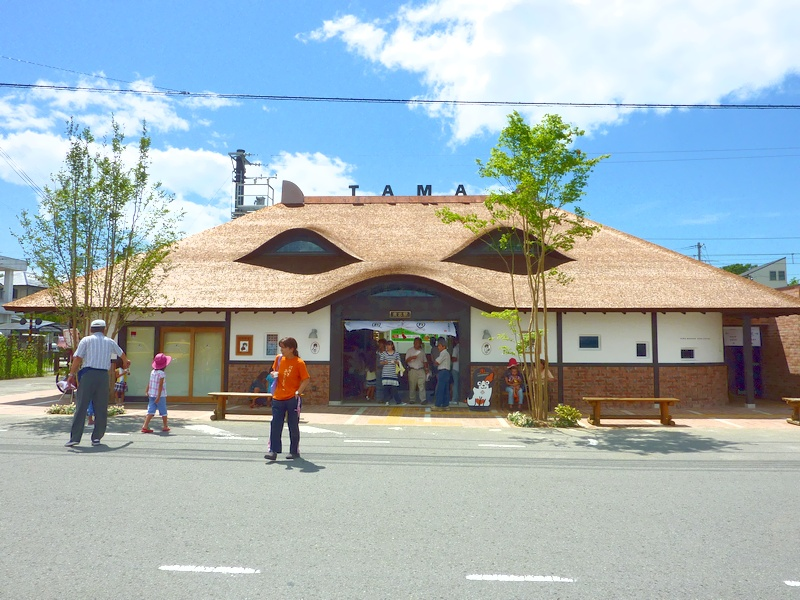
- Kishi Station in August 2010

General information
- Location: Kishigawacho Kodo, Kinokawa-shi, Wakayama-ken 640-0413; Japan
- Coordinates: 34.2096°N 135.3120°E
- Operator: Wakayama Electric Railway
- Line: ■ Kishigawa Line
- Distance: 14.3 km from Wakayama
- Platforms: 1 side platform

Construction
- Structure type: At-grade

Other information
- Status: Staffed
- Station code: 14

History
- Opened: 18 August 1933

Passengers
- FY2017: 1397 per day
Location
- Location within Wakayama Prefecture Location within Japan

Kishi Station (貴志駅, Kishi-eki) is a passenger railway station located in the city of Kinokawa, Wakayama Prefecture, Japan, operated by the private railway company Wakayama Electric Railway.

Kishi Station is known for Tama the stationmaster cat, who holds the official position of "Super Station Master" and serves as the station's mascot. Six such Tama cats have served in various stops of the Kishikawa railway line as of 2026. As of November 2025, Tama IV became the stationmaster cat following the death of her predecessor, Tama II. She has an apprentice who substitutes for her, Tama VI.

== Lines ==
Kishi Station is a terminal station of the Kishigawa Line, and is located 14.3 kilometers from the opposing terminus of the line at Wakayama Station.

== Station layout ==
The station consists of one deadheaded side platform serving a single bi-directional track.

Since Tama's appointment as station master in 2007, the station has consistently been staffed and managed by a cat. Since her passing, she has been succeeded by Nitama in 2015, and Yontama since 2026.

Since renovation, the station is housed in a cat-face-shaped building, with a Tama-theme cafe, with cat theme chairs and cakes. There is a souvenir shop with a wide range of stationery (pens, staplers and others) and Kishi Station uniforms. The Wakayama Electric Railway operates three cat-themed trains: Strawberry, Tama, and Toy. The feline stationmaster works on Friday–Tuesday (10am–4pm) and is off duty on Wednesday and Thursday.

== Adjacent stations ==
«	Service	»
Kishigawa Line
Kanrojimae	Local	Terminus

== History ==
Kishi Station opened on August 18, 1933 as part of the Kishigawa Line, following the line's extension from Idakiso Station.

On April 1, 2006, Nankai Electric Railway transferred operatorship of the Kishi Station over to the Wakayama Electric Railway Company, the latter of which would eventually de-staff the station to cut costs. On January 5th of the following year, Tama, a female calico cat which had resided in the station, was appointed stationmaster and mascot. Two of her fellow cats, Chibi and Miiko, were appointed assistant stationmasters.

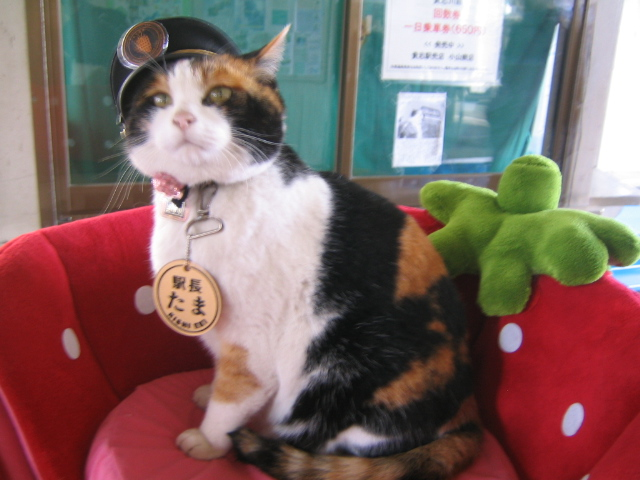
Tama I, Kishi's first feline stationmaster.

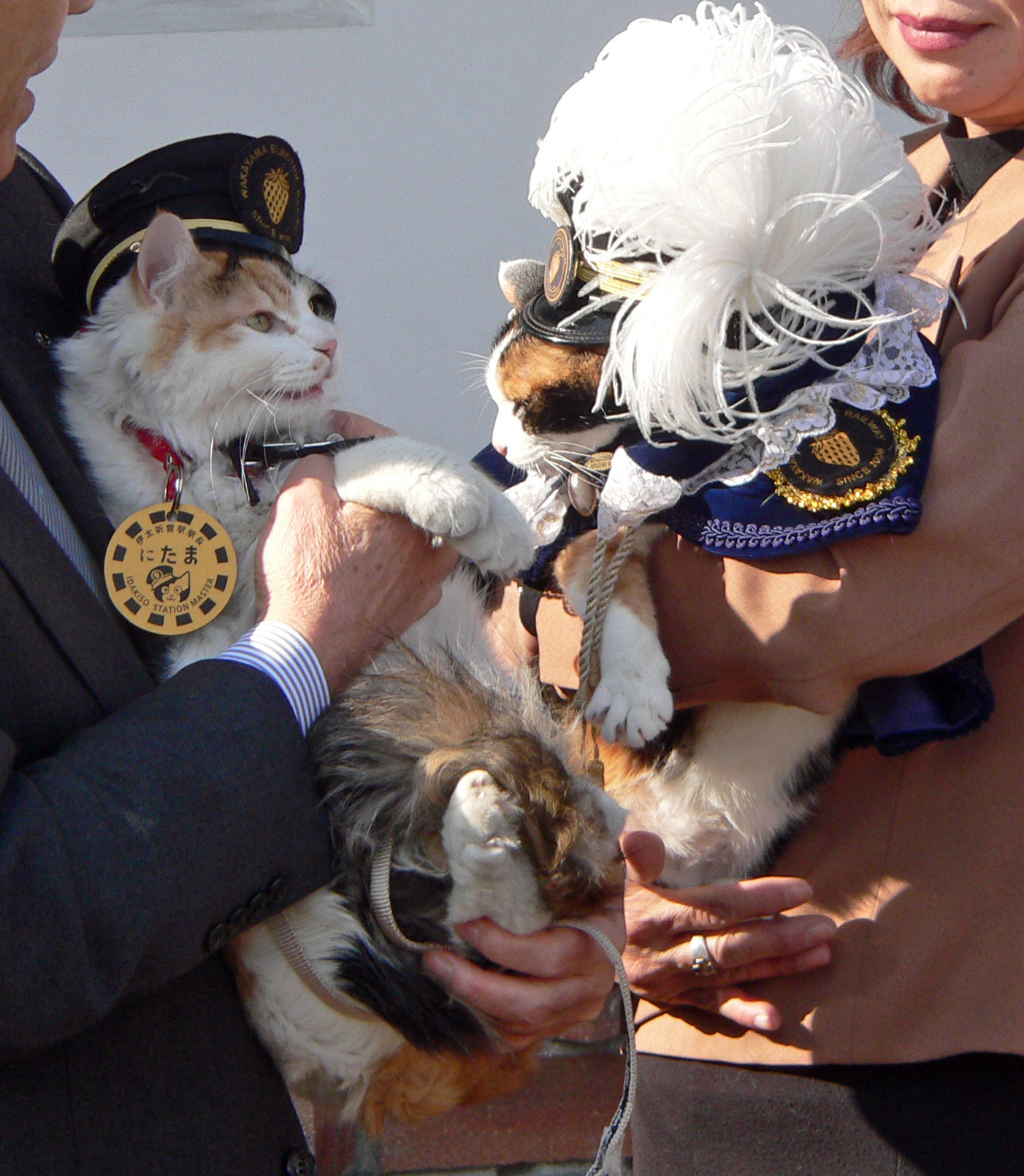
Tama II, second stationmaster of Kishi Station (left) next to Tama I (right)

On April 20, 2008, a "stationmaster's office" for Tama was installed as part of a series of renovations.

On February 1, 2010, the Kishi Station building was closed and demolished. Construction began on a new station facility in March, with the completion of a new cat-themed complex known as the "Tama Museum".

On January 5, 2012 — coinciding with her 5th work anniversary — Tama was promoted to "Super Station Master" as a tribute to her efforts in attracting customers and "revitalizing the Wakayama Electric Railway". The same day, a calico cat named Tama II (Nitama) was appointed assistant stationmaster.

Tama passed away on June 22, 2015; a funeral was held 5 days later. On August 11, Tama II would succeed Tama to become the next Station Master. On January 5, 2018, Tama II was promoted to "manager stationmaster". Tama IV (Yontama), another calico cat, took on the role of acting stationmaster at Kishi Station on Wednesdays and Thursdays.

On August 21, 2021, Tama II was awarded the title of "Wakayama Prefecture Knight".

Following the death of Tama II in November 2025, Tama IV was inaugurated as the third stationmaster of Kishi Station in January 2026.. Tama IV is supplemented by a substitute cat who serves at various stations on selected days, Tama VI (Rokutama).

== Passenger statistics ==
The Kishi Station is the second busiest station on the Kishigawa Line, after the Wakayama Station.

Average riders per day
Year	Ridership
2000	1,744
2001	1,704
2002	1,483
2003	1,480
2004	1,397
2005	1,358
2006	1,008
2007	1,011
2008	1,349
2009	1,341
2010	1,342
2011	1,345
2012	1,340
2013	1,427
2014	1,415
2015	1,507
2016	1,425
2017	1,397
2018	1,342
2019	1,276
2020	653
2021	668
2022	685
2023	715
2024	759

== Gallery ==
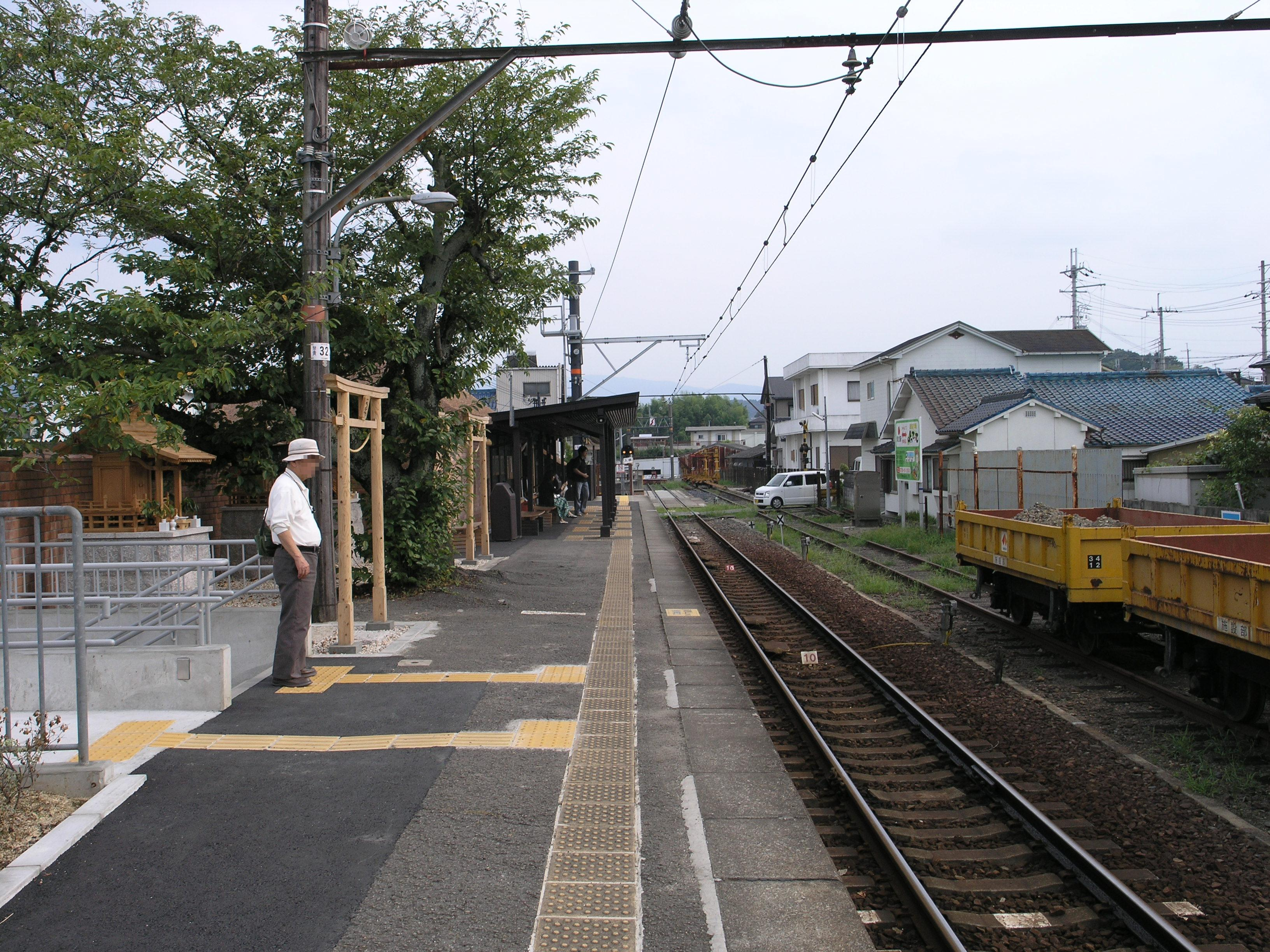
The renovated platform with a Shinto shrine on the left, August 2010

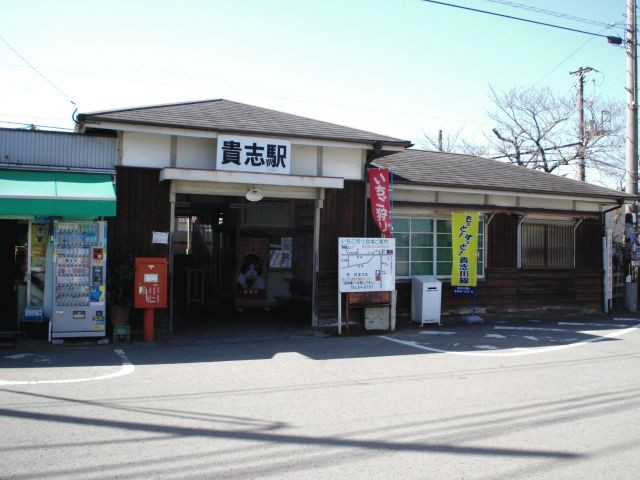
Façade of the old Kishi Station

== Surrounding locations ==
- Kinokawa City Nakatakashi Elementary School

== See also ==
- List of railway stations in Japan
