= Station master =

Person in charge of a railway station

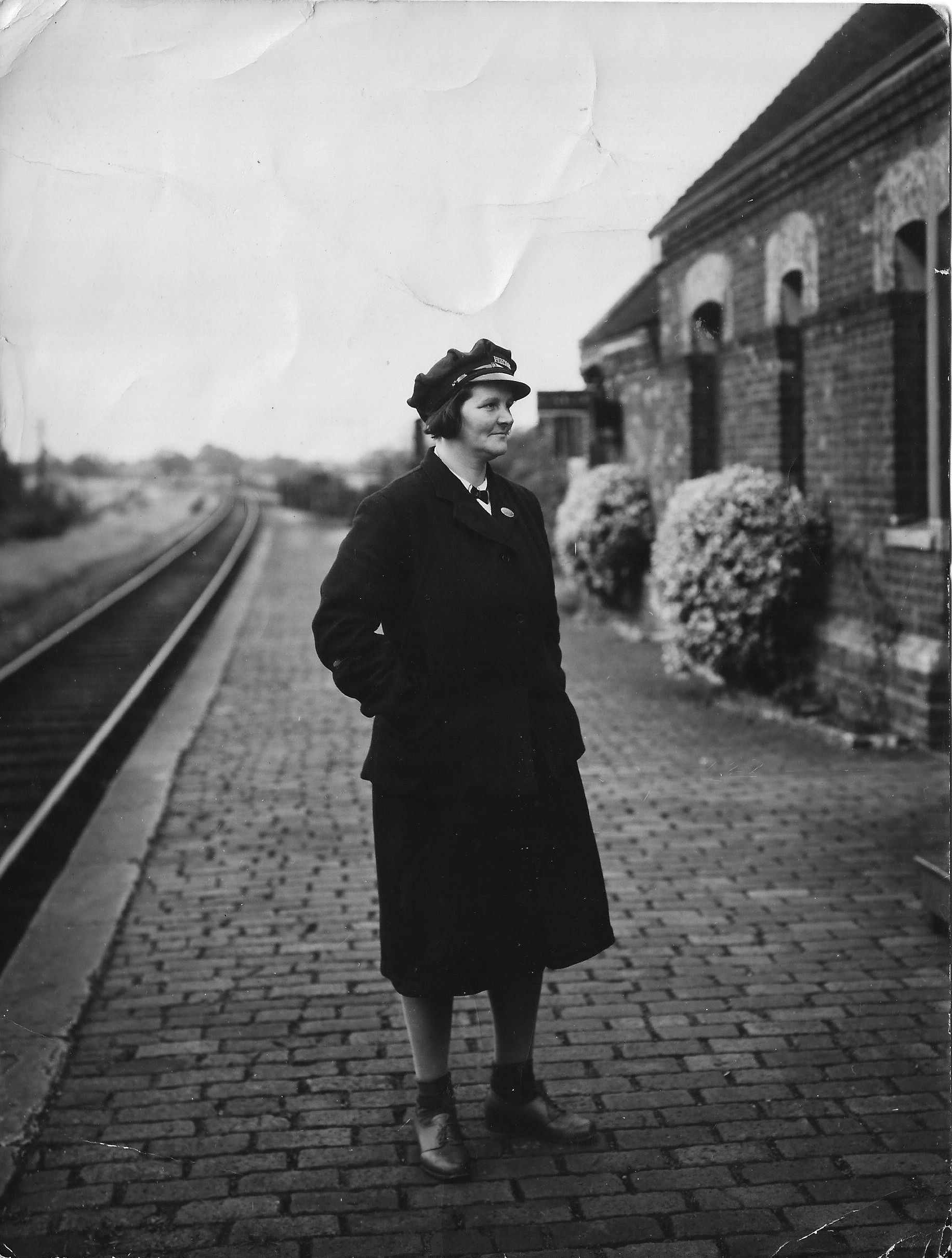
Station mistress at Padbury railway station

The station master (or stationmaster) is the person in charge of a railway station, particularly in the United Kingdom and many other countries outside North America. In the United Kingdom, where the term originated, it is now largely historical or colloquial, with the contemporary term being station manager. However, the term station master remains current on many heritage railways, and also in many countries outside the United Kingdom, notably the extensive Indian Railways network.

Historically a male occupation, women were sometimes appointed to the position, and the gender variation station mistress was sometimes employed in such cases. In the United States the role is commonly termed station agent.

== Job description ==
The station master is responsible for the management of other station employees and holds responsibility for safety and the efficient running of the station. The term was historically employed across stations of all sizes, leading to variation in the precise role. At a major city terminus, with potentially hundreds of employees, the station master's duties would focus on personnel management and public relations. At smaller town and country stations, with a more limited staff, the station master would have far more customer interaction with travelling passengers, and would commonly deputise for other members of staff in their absence.

On the contemporary British rail network a station manager at a major station has duties very similar to those described above. The more localised role of station master at small country stations no longer exists, with group station managers taking responsibility for two or more stations. In very rural areas a station manager may be responsible for a large number of stations, or even for all the stations on a local branch line.

== Deputies and staff ==
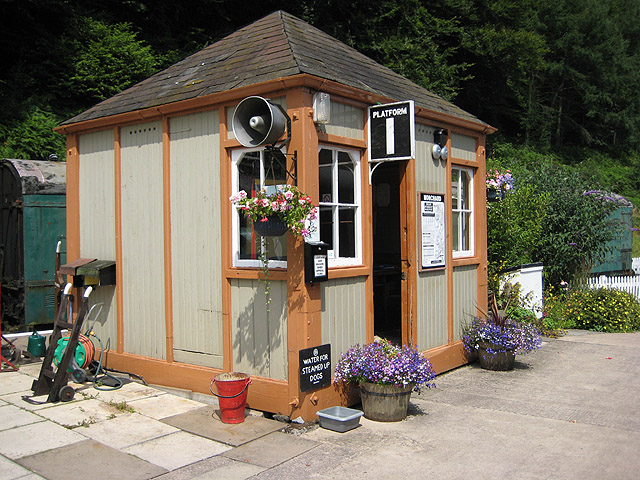
Station master's office at Norchard railway station

Historically, the station master deputised an assistant station master (ASM). In large stations this might be a full-time position. In smaller local stations, the ASM title was often attached to another post, such as senior booking clerk, or even head porter. On heritage railways, the ASM role is often unchanged from this historic role. The ASM post also continues in many Commonwealth nations, and other countries which have experienced British influence. In contemporary British railway operations, the station manager often deputises one or more shift (or duty) station managers.

The number of other employees at a railway station varies according to size. A historic station master would typically manage a number of booking clerks (responsible for ticket sales and financial auditing), porters (responsible for platform safety, luggage transportation, and cleaning), and often ancillary staff in catering, left luggage, and maintenance roles. Although technically part of the engineering department, a station master might also have day-to-day management of signalmen in the station's signal box.

== Social position ==
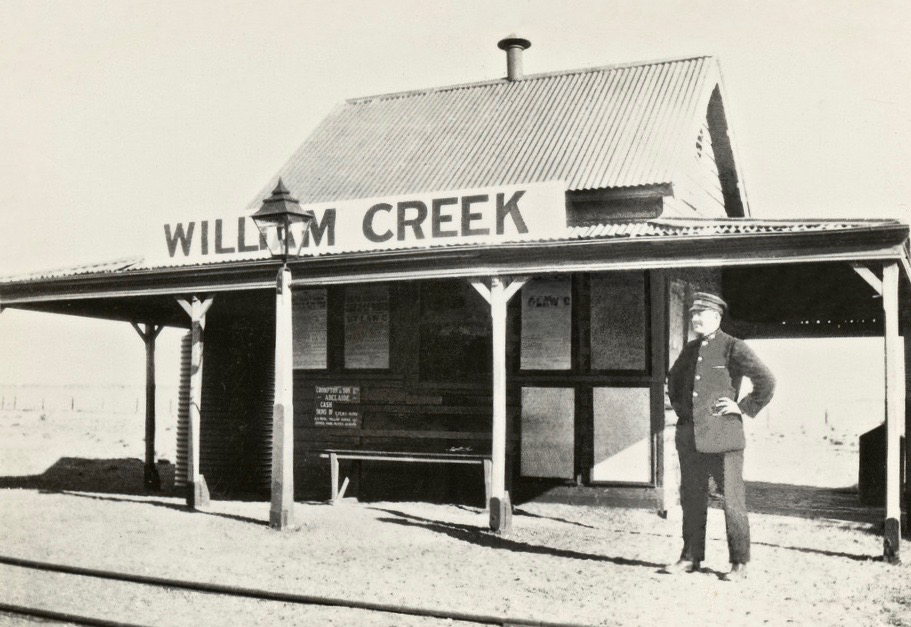
A station master in Australia in 1925

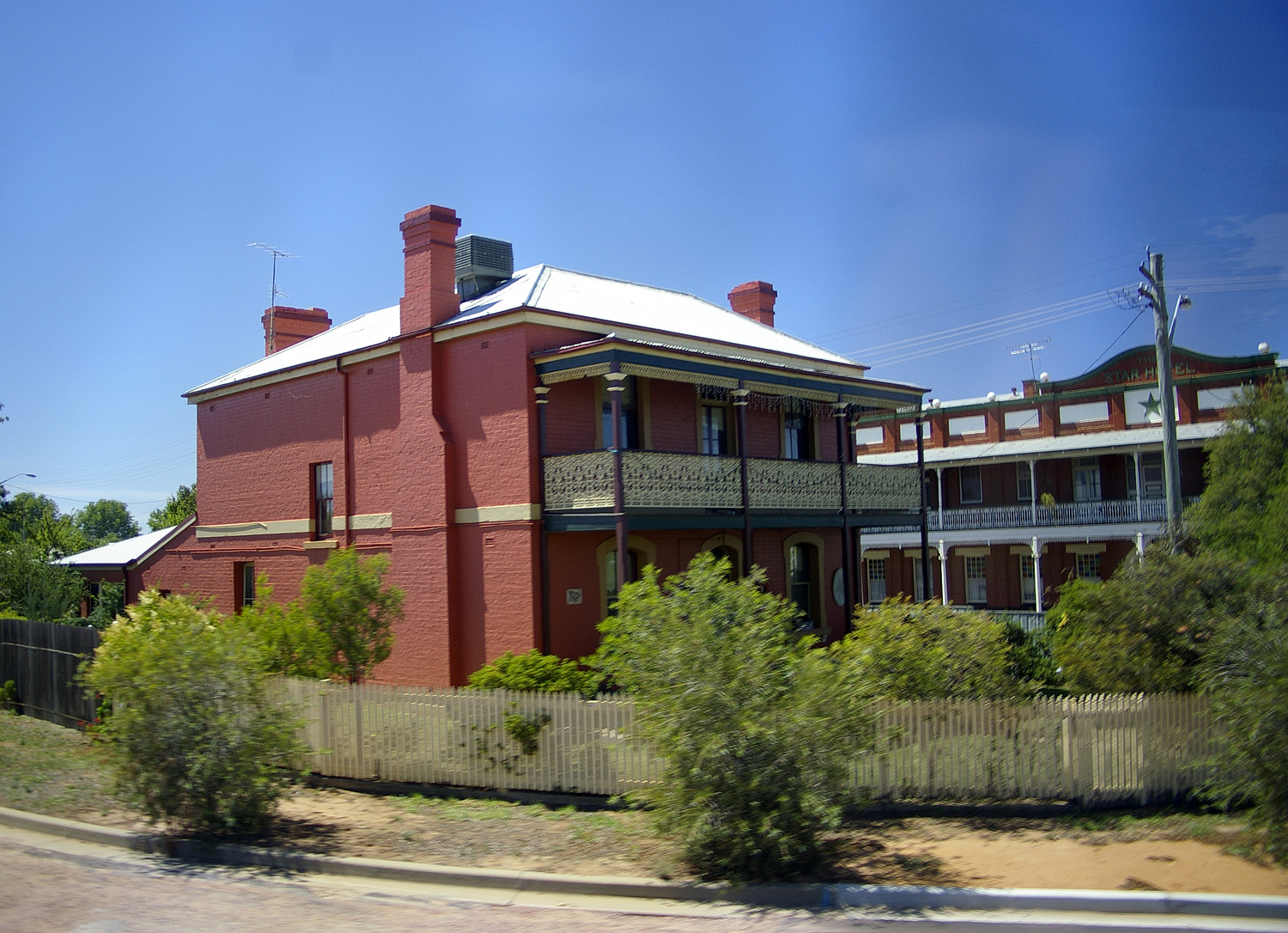
The former station master's house at Narrandera, Australia

From the late Victorian era onwards, station masters became prominent figures in local communities. Invariably they would be provided with a substantial house and, in rural communities particularly, would have significant social standing.

The uniforms worn by station masters, whilst varying widely between different railway companies, often incorporated gold braid embroidery, and peaked caps with gold banding, giving the office-holder a high profile in the community. With his uniform, official housing, and public prominence, the station master was respected and widely attributed with seniority in the local community.

Some station masters achieved legendary fame in their communities. The late James Miller, long-serving station master at Oxford railway station, received widespread recognition for his devoted service in the post, including civic decoration, a public-subscription retirement gift, the award of the British Empire Medal, and the naming of a carriage siding after him.

In the Beeching cuts of the 1960s, many small stations were closed and the station master's house, along with other railway property, were sold off. Typically, these buildings retained their original name and in many communities the Station Master's House can still be found as a private dwelling or converted into a restaurant.

In current Indian society, station masters continue to enjoy a high social standing, and there is considerable competition for vacancies. Indian Railways staff who have attained the grade of assistant station master (ASM), or station master (including regional station managers), have their own professional body or trade union, the All India Station Masters' Association.

== See also ==
- List of railway industry occupations
- Tama (cat)
