= 神前駅 =

神前駅 is the name of multiple train stations in Japan:

- Kanzaki Station (disambiguation)
  - Kanzaki Station (Kagawa)
- Kōzaki Station (disambiguation)
  - Kōzaki Station (Wakayama)
