= 甘露寺 =

甘露寺, meaning "temple of honeydew", may refer to:

- Ganlu Temple, several temples
- Kanroji, Japanese surname
