= Hinokuma Shrine =

Building in Wakayama Prefecture, Japan

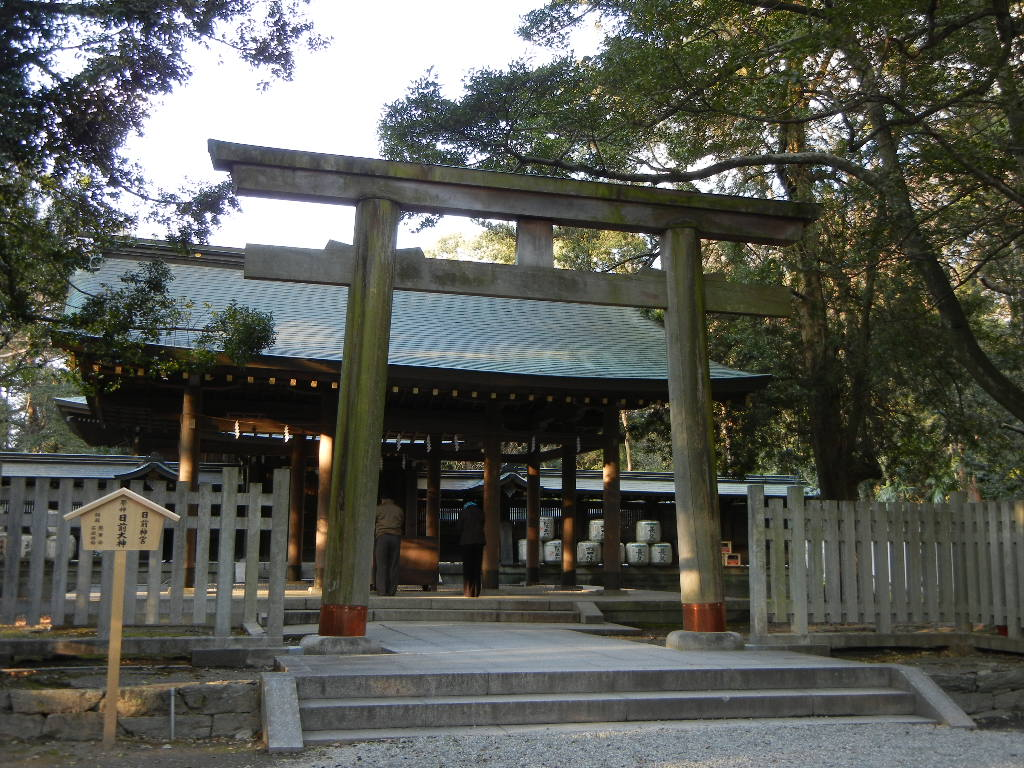
- Hinokuma Shrine

- Location within Japan

Religion
- Affiliation: Shinto

Location
- Interactive map of Hinokuma Shrine
- Coordinates: 34°13′41″N 135°12′09″E

Hinokuma Shrine (日前神宮, Hinokuma jingu) and Kunikakasu Shrine (國懸神宮, Kunikakasu jingu) is a Shinto shrine complex in Wakayama, Wakayama Prefecture, Japan. It is officially known simply as nichizengū (日前宮). Its main festival is held annually on September 26. It shares the rank of the Ise Grand Shrine in the shinkai system. It was formerly an imperial shrine of the first rank (官幣大社, kanpei taisha) in the modern system of ranked Shinto shrines. It was also formerly the ichinomiya of Kii Province.

== Transportation ==
The shrine can be reached by Nichizengū Station on the Wakayama Electric Railway Kishigawa Line.

== Overview ==
At the entrance, the Hinokuma Shrine is located on the left side, and the Kunikakasu Shrine is on the right side. Visiting the shrine in Wakayama City, along with Kamayama Jinja and Itakiso Shrine, is called "Sansha Mairi" (visiting three shrines).

== History ==
The shrine is one of the oldest in Japan and has deep connections with mythology. The "Nihon Shoki" says that a mirror cast by Ishikori-dome-no-Mikoto before the Yata-no-Kagami, when Amaterasu Omikami hid in Amano-Iwato, is enshrined at the Hinokuma Shrine.

Initially, the shrine was located in Hamanomiya, Mezugori, Nagusa District.

In 1871 (Meiji 4), under the modern shrine ranking system, both shrines were designated as Kanpei Taisha. Currently, the shrine is an independent religious corporation not affiliated with organizations such as the Association of Shinto Shrines.

== See also ==
- List of Jingū
