= Kire Station =

Railway station in Wakayama, Wakayama Prefecture, Japan

Kire Station 吉礼駅
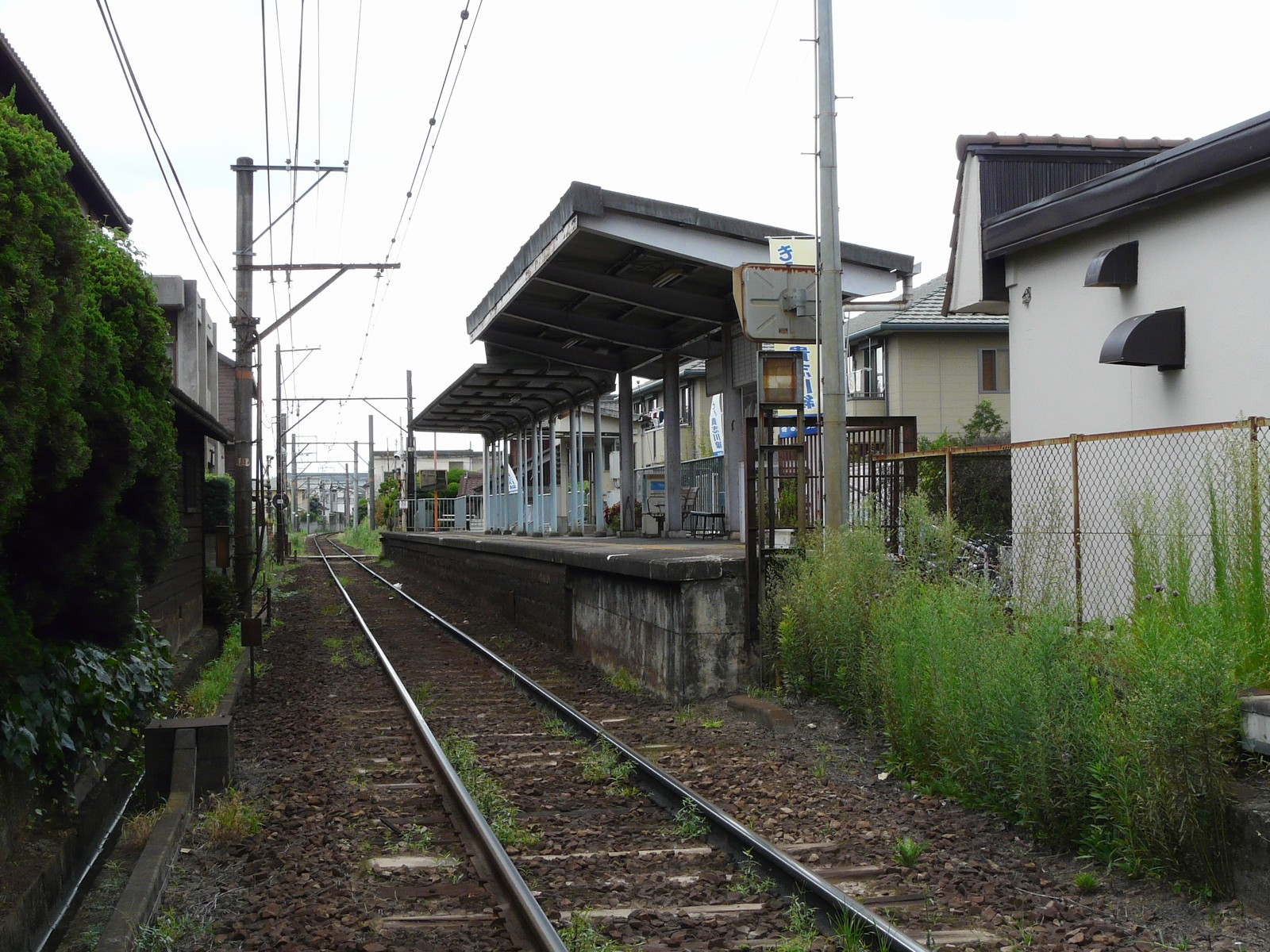
- Kire Station, July 2008

General information
- Location: Kire, Wakayama-shi, Wakayama-ken, 640-0351; Japan
- Coordinates: 34.2034°N 135.2361°E
- Operator: Wakayama Electric Railway
- Line: ■ Kishigawa Line
- Distance: 6.4 km from Wakayama
- Platforms: 1 side platform

Construction
- Structure type: At-grade

Other information
- Status: Unstaffed
- Station code: 08

History
- Opened: 15 February 1916

Passengers
- FY2017: 446 per day
Location
- Location within Wakayama Prefecture Location within Japan

Kire Station (吉礼駅, Kire eki) is a passenger railway station in located in the city of Wakayama, Wakayama Prefecture, Japan, operated by the private railway company Wakayama Electric Railway.

== Lines ==
Kire Station is served by the Kishigawa Line, and is located 6.4 kilometers from the terminus of the line at Wakayama Station.

== Station layout ==
The station consists of one side platform serving a single bi-directional track. There is no station building and the station is unattended.

== Adjacent stations ==
«	Service	»
Kishigawa Line
Okazakimae	Local	Idakiso

== History ==
Kire Station opened on February 15, 1916. The station building was demolished in 1998.

== Passenger statistics ==
Ridership per day
Year	Ridership
2011	596
2012	592
2013	625
2014	625
2015	476
2016	452
2017	446

== Surrounding Area ==
- Sando Elementary School, Wakayama City
- Wakayama City Hall Nishiyama East Branch
- Wakayama Shin-Ai Women's Junior College

== See also ==
- List of railway stations in Japan
