= Okazakimae Station =

Railway station in Wakayama, Wakayama Prefecture, Japan

Okazakimae Station 岡崎前駅
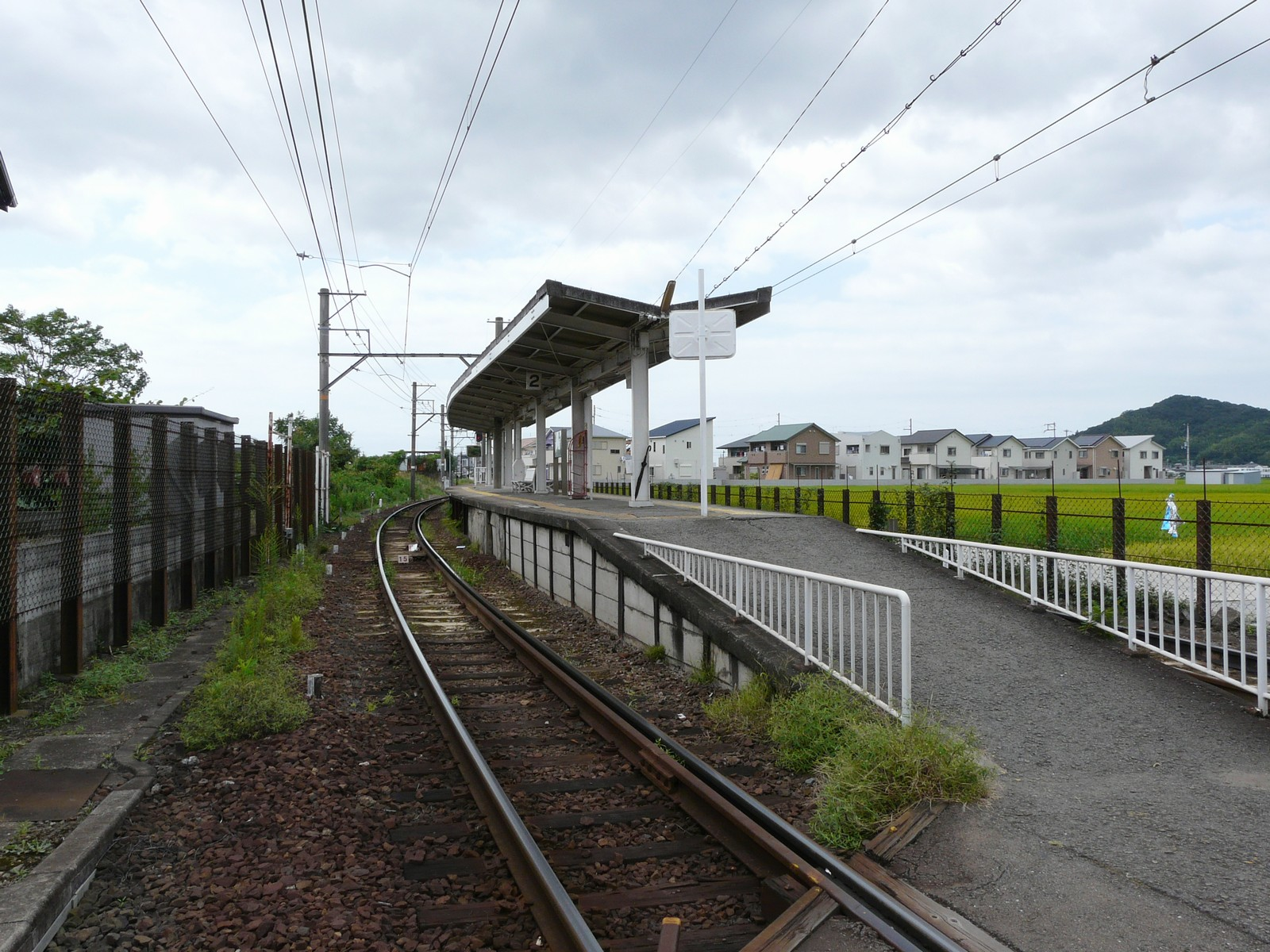
- Okazakimae Station, July 2008

General information
- Location: Sozaka, Wakayama-shi, Wakayama-ken, 640-0341; Japan
- Coordinates: 34.2035°N 135.2249°E
- Operator: Wakayama Electric Railway
- Line: ■ Kishigawa Line
- Distance: 5.4 km from Wakayama
- Platforms: 1 island platform

Construction
- Structure type: At-grade

Other information
- Status: Unstaffed
- Station code: 07

History
- Opened: 15 February 1916

Passengers
- FY2017: 1,002 per day
Location
- Location within Wakayama Prefecture Location within Japan

Okazakimae Station (岡崎前駅, Okazakimae eki) is a passenger railway station in located in the city of Wakayama, Wakayama Prefecture, Japan, operated by the private railway company Wakayama Electric Railway.

== Lines ==
Okazakimae Station is served by the Kishigawa Line, and is located 5.4 kilometers from the terminus of the line at Wakayama Station.

== Station layout ==
The station consists of one island platform with a level crossing. There is no station building and the station is unattended.

== Adjacent stations ==
«	Service	»
Kishigawa Line
Kōtsū Center Mae	Local	Kire

== History ==
Okazakimae Station opened on February 15, 1916.

== Passenger statistics ==
Ridership per day
Year	Ridership
2011	756
2012	748
2013	806
2014	789
2015	1,065
2016	1,013
2017	1,002

== Surrounding area ==
- Wakayama Municipal Higashi Junior High School
- Wakayama Prefectural Wakayama Higashi High School
- Wakayama Shin-Ai Women's Junior College

== See also ==
- List of railway stations in Japan
