= Narugami Shell Mound =

Remains of Jōmon period settlement

Narugami Shell Midden
- 鳴神貝塚 (Japanese)
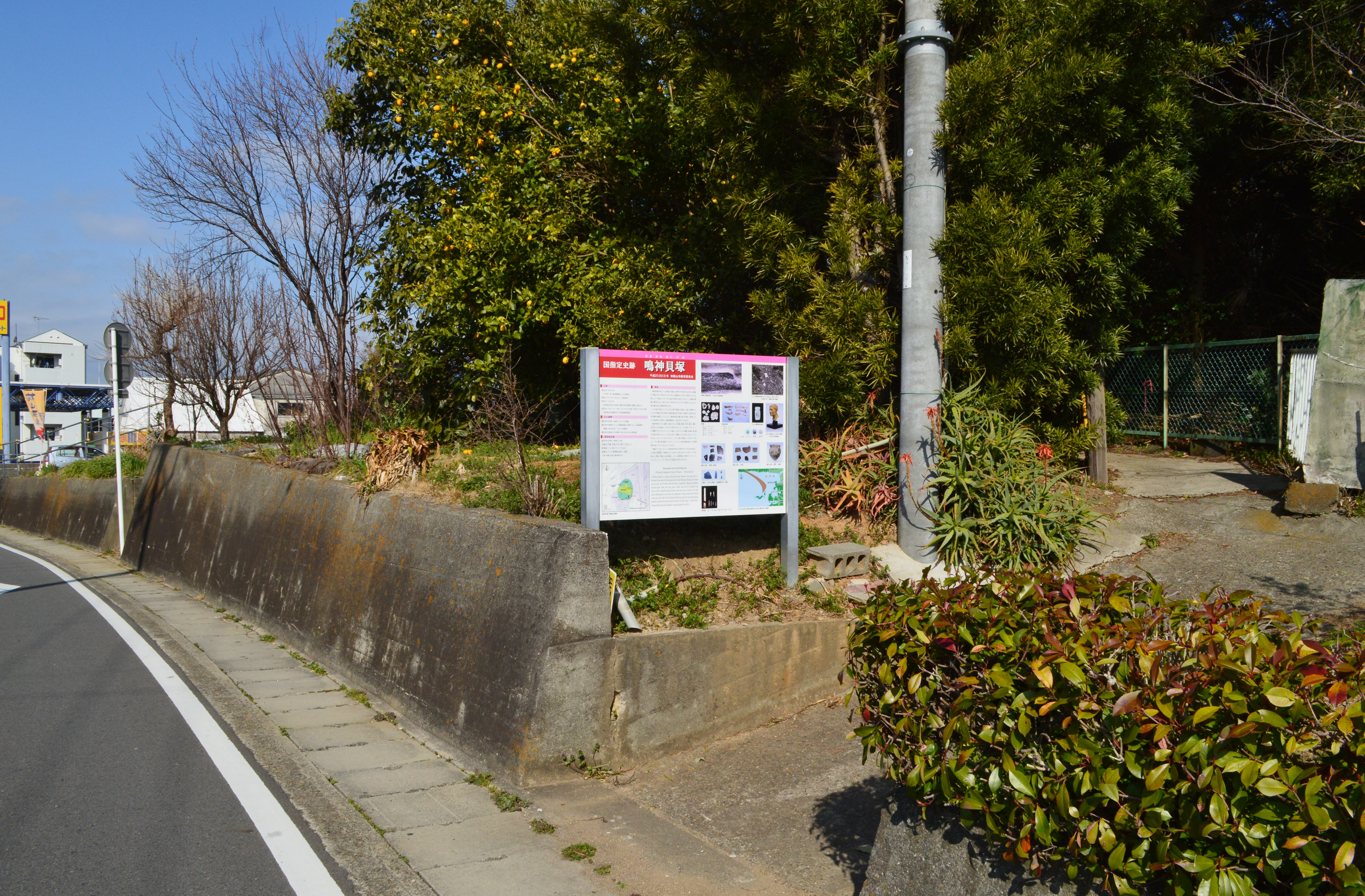
- Narugami Shell Midden

- Narugami Shell Midden Narugami Shell Mound (Japan)
- 34°13′50″N 135°12′42″E
- Type: shell midden
- Periods: Jōmon period
- Location: Wakayama, Wakayama, Japan
- Region: Kansai region

Site notes
- Area: .
- Public access: Yes

The Narugami Shell Midden (鳴神貝塚, Narugami kaizuka) is an archaeological site consisting of a shell midden and the remains of an adjacent Jōmon period settlement located in the Narutaki-chō neighborhood the city of Wakayama, Wakayama Prefecture in the Kansai region of Japan. The midden was designated a National Historic Site of Japan in 1931.

== Overview ==
During the early to middle Jōmon period (approximately 4000 to 2500 BC), sea levels were five to six meters higher than at present, and the ambient temperature was also 2 deg C higher. During this period, the Kansai region was inhabited by the Jōmon people, many of whom lived in coastal settlements. The middens associated with such settlements contain bone, botanical material, mollusc shells, sherds, lithics, and other artifacts and ecofacts associated with the now-vanished inhabitants, and these features, provide a useful source into the diets and habits of Jōmon society. Most of the shell middens are found along the Pacific coast of Japan.

The Narutaki Shell Midden is the first shell midden to have been discovered in the Kansai region of Japan in 1895. It is located at the western foot of Mount Hana, extending into paddy fields on the plain below the mountain, and is a rare example of a shell midden in the Kansai region of Japan. Archaeological excavations have found that the midden extends 110 meters east-to-west by 100 meters north-to-south, making it the largest in the prefecture. The shell layer had a thickness of around 30-centimeters and is buried at a depth of around 1.7 meters below the present ground level. It was found to contain many stone tools and stone axes, tools made from deer bone and stingray spines, stone or clay earrings and bracelets, and many of marine shellfish such as ark shells, oysters, Sazae clams, shijimi clans and hamaguri clams and the bones of fish, deer, wild boar and monkeys. The skeleton of a woman was also uncovered. It is speculated that she may have been a shaman, as she was buried with her arms outstretched, and she was missing both upper canine teeth.

The site is about 15-minutes on foot from Nichizengū Station on the Wakayama Electric Railway Kishigawa Line.

== See also ==
- List of Historic Sites of Japan (Wakayama)
