= Oikeyūen Station =

Railway station in Kinokawa, Wakayama Prefecture, Japan

Oikeyūen Station 大池遊園駅
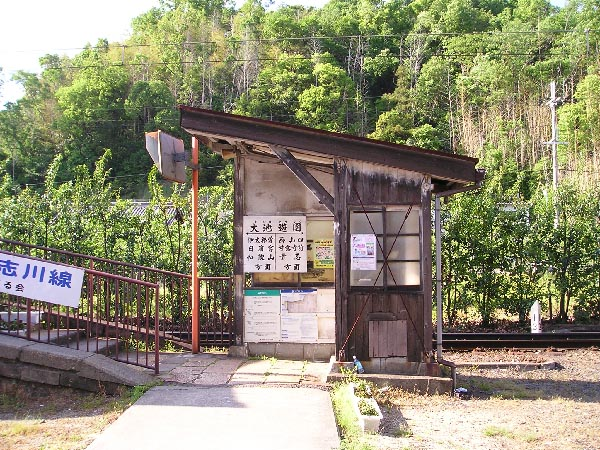
- Oikeyūen Station, October 2005

General information
- Location: Kishigawacho Nagayama, Kinokawa-shi, Wakayama-ken 640-0416; Japan
- Coordinates: 34.2047°N 135.2857°E
- Operator: Wakayama Electric Railway
- Line: ■ Kishigawa Line
- Distance: 11.3 km from Wakayama
- Platforms: 1 island platform

Construction
- Structure type: At-grade

Other information
- Status: Unstaffed
- Station code: 11

History
- Opened: 18 August 1933

Passengers
- FY2017: 212 per day
Location
- Location within Wakayama Prefecture Location within Japan

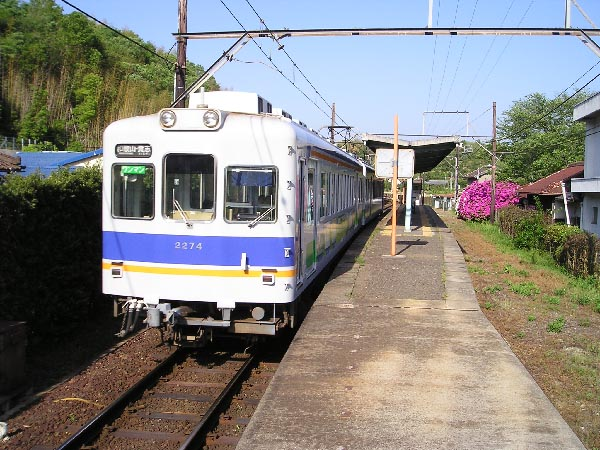
Platform

Oikeyūen Station (大池遊園駅, Oikeyūen-eki) is a passenger railway station in located in the city of Kinokawa, Wakayama Prefecture, Japan, operated by the private railway company Wakayama Electric Railway.

== Lines ==
Oikeyūen Station is served by the Kishigawa Line, and is located 11.3 kilometers from the terminus of the line at Wakayama Station.

== Station layout ==
The station consists of one side platform connected to an open-fronted shelter containing a ticket machine by a level crossing. The station is unattended.

== Adjacent stations ==
«	Service	»
Kishigawa Line
Sandō	Local	Nishiyamaguchi

== History ==
Oikeyūen Station opened on August 18, 1933.

== Passenger statistics ==
Ridership per day
Year	Ridership
2011	221
2012	219
2013	235
2014	231
2015	226
2016	215
2017	212

== Surrounding Area ==
- Oike Pond

== See also ==
- List of railway stations in Japan
