= Nichizengū Station =

Railway station in Wakayama, Wakayama Prefecture, Japan

Nichizengū Station 日前宮駅
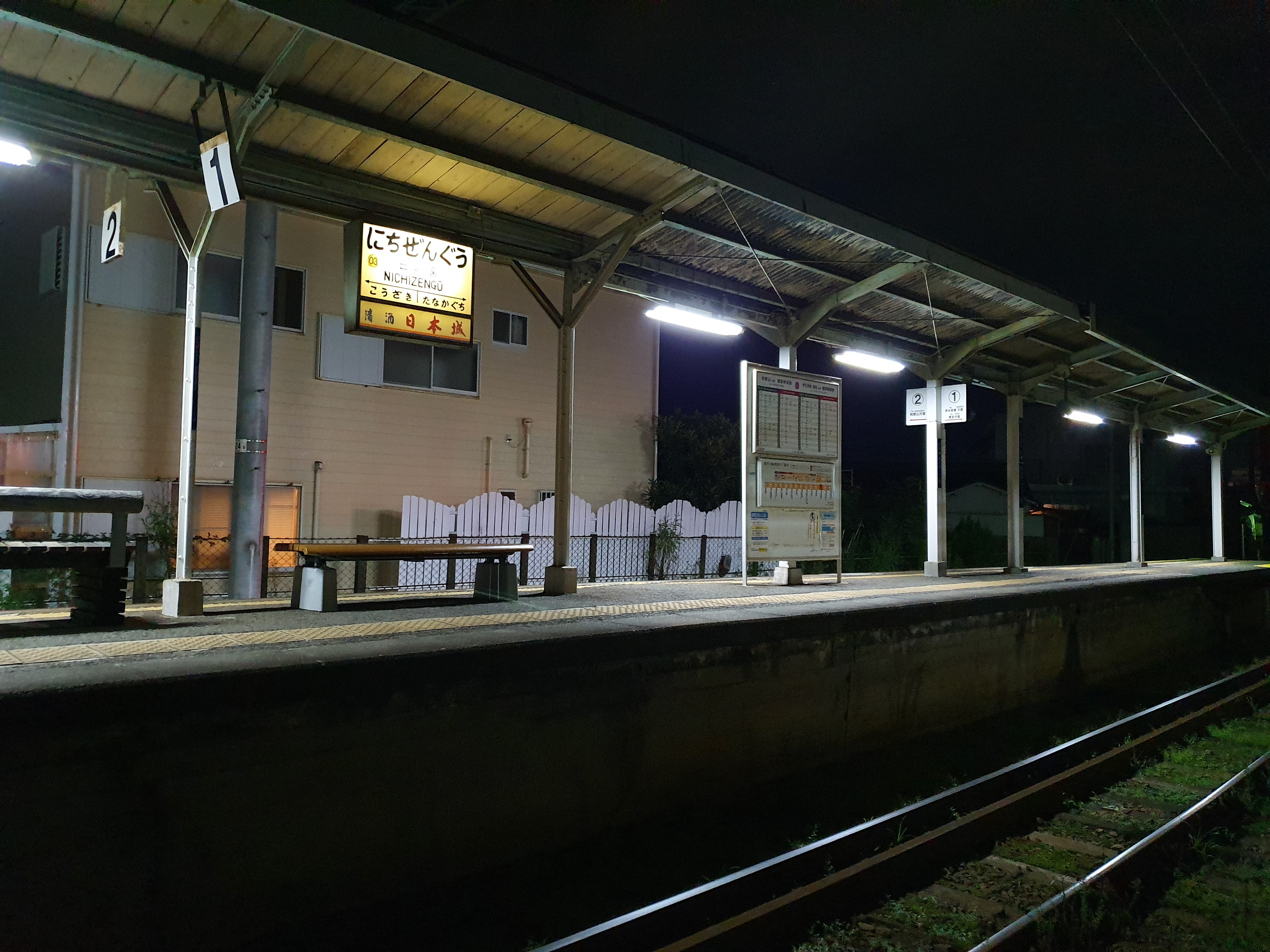
- Station platform

General information
- Location: Arie, Wakayama-shi, Wakayama-ken, 640-8316; Japan
- Coordinates: 34.2265°N 135.2018°E
- Operator: Wakayama Electric Railway
- Line: ■ Kishigawa Line
- Distance: 1.4 km from Wakayama
- Platforms: 1 island platform

Construction
- Structure type: At-grade

Other information
- Status: Unstaffed
- Station code: 03

History
- Opened: 15 February 1916
- Former names: Akitsuki (to 1933)

Passengers
- FY2017: 730 per day
Location
- Location within Wakayama Prefecture Location within Japan

Nichizengū Station (日前宮駅, Nichizengū eki) is a passenger railway station in located in the city of Wakayama, Wakayama Prefecture, Japan, operated by the private railway company Wakayama Electric Railway. The station is named after the nearby Hinokuma Shrine, which is also alternatively pronounced as "Nichizengū".

== Lines ==
Nichizengū Station is served by the Kishigawa Line, and is located 1.4 kilometers from the terminus of the line at Wakayama Station.

== Station layout ==
The station consists of one island platform with a level crossing. There is no station building and the station is unattended.

== Adjacent stations ==
«	Service	»
Kishigawa Line
Tanakaguchi	Local	Kōzaki

== History ==
Nichizengū Station opened on February 15, 1916 as Akitsuki Station (秋月駅). It was renamed to its present name in 1933.

== Passenger statistics ==
Ridership per day
Year	Ridership
2011	592
2012	587
2013	628
2014	620
2015	777
2016	738
2017	730

== Surrounding Area ==
- Hinokuma Shrine / Kunikakasu Shrine
- Narugami Shell Mound, National Historic Site as a national historic site.
- Wakayama Prefectural Koyo Junior and Senior High School
- Wakayama City Nisshin Junior High School
- Wakayama City Miya Elementary School

== See also ==
- List of railway stations in Japan
