= Seikibashi Line =

Tram line in Okayama, Japan

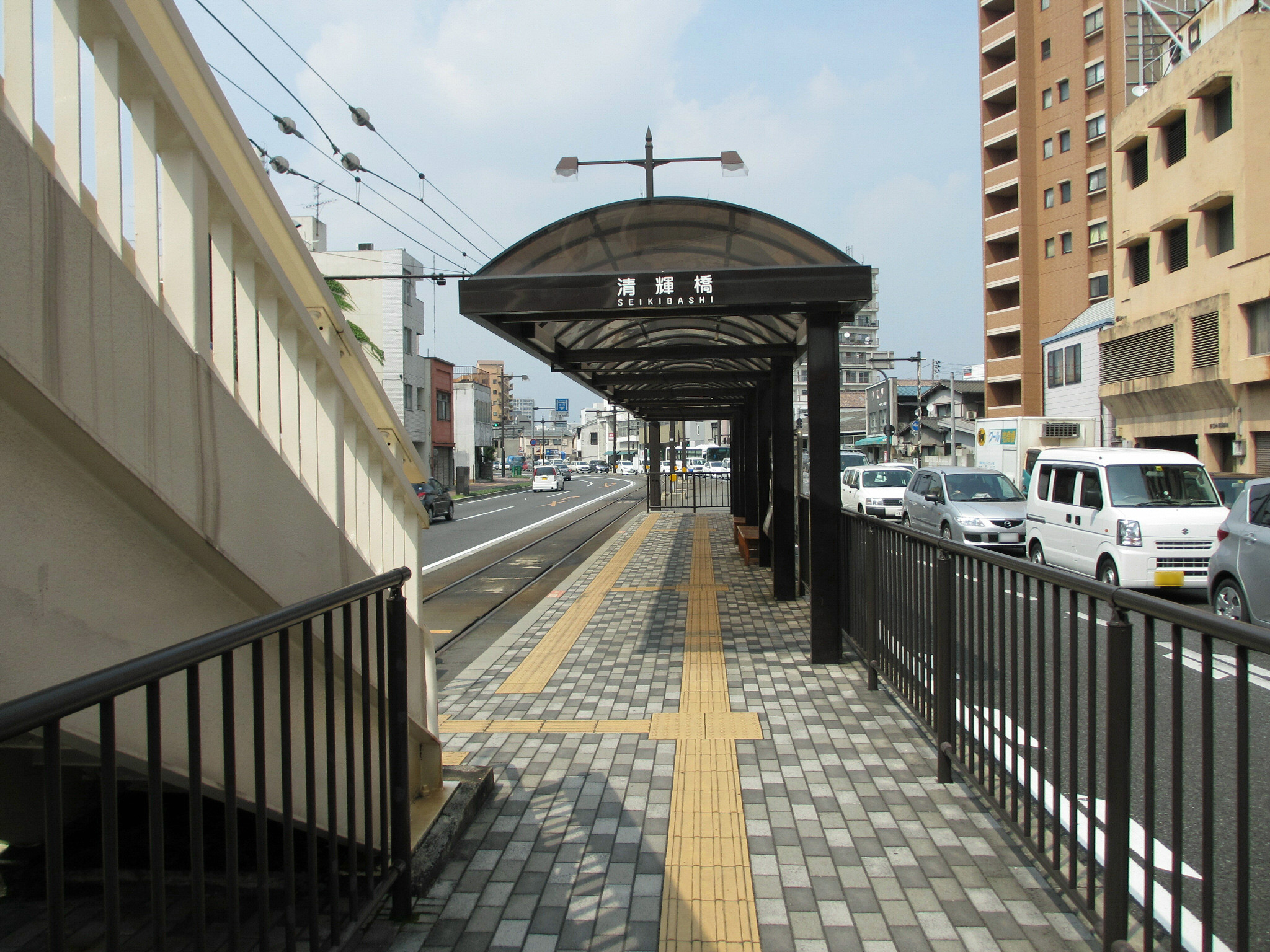
- The last stop Seikibashi Station （after constructing barrier-free）

Overview
- Owner: Okayama Electric Tramway
- Termini: Yanagawa; Seikibashi
- Stations: 7

Service
- Depot(s): Higashiyama Barn

History
- Opened: 18 March 1928
- Last extension: 6 Sep. 1946

Technical
- Line length: 1.6 km (0.99 mi)
- Track gauge: 1,067 mm (3 ft 6 in)
- Electrification: 600v DC
Route map

Okayama Electric Tramway Seikibashi Line (Japanese: 岡山電気軌道清輝橋線) is an Okayama Electric Tramway route that runs between Yanagawa Station (Okayama) and Seikibashi Station in Okayama, Okayama, Okayama Prefecture, Japan.

== Outline ==
This tram line is located in Okayama and has double-track, which runs on many streets. The tram line can be split into Higashiyama Main Line and this tram line at Yanagawa Station (Okayama) and runs for the south district of Okayama City along the national highway Yanagawa Suji, which is made of Okayama Prefectural Route 27, Japan National Route 180, and Japan National Route 53 through Seikibashi Station.

Okayama Electric Tramway had a license to extend the line to Hōsei District, but the license was abolished in 1960.

When this company constructed this tram line, which runs on Yanagawa Suji, Okayama City suggested, using The Side Reservation Method サイドリザベーション方式, that the outbound line and the inbound line be installed between each street and pedestrian road. This is a rare construction method in Japan. As the roads were being reconstructed, this tram line was also reconstructed, simultaneously, the platforms on all stations except Seikibashi Station were rebuilt as island-type. In 2002, almost all stations on the tram line were barrier-free, excluding Seikibashi Station, due to the introduction of Type 9200 MOMO. Seikibashi Station had not been upgraded to be barrier-free. The station's platform has been moved to the place where it is located under the bridge for pedestrians since 2007, and the station has been developed barrier-free.

=== Fares ===
A fare for riding on the entire line costs 140 yen (as of 2020). But the fare for riding on the tram line between Okayama Station and Yūbinkyoku Mae Station costs 100 yen, and the fare is at the same price as a lot of the competing buses that are operated from Okayama Station to Omotemachi Bus Center via Tenmanya Bus Terminal because Okayama tries to promote using public transportations.

== History ==
- 18 March 1928 – opened as Yanagawa Line between Yanagawa station and Daiunji-machi.
- 1 September 1931 – Higashi-Tamachi Station opened, between Maroyamachi-Suji and Renshōji-mae.
- 6 July 1937 – Higashi-Tamachi Station renamed to Yūbinkyoku-mae Station.
- 23 June 1942 – Renshōji-mae renamed to Shiyakusho-mae Station (Okayama).
- 6 September 1946 – renamed from Yanagawa Line to Seikibashi Line, opening between Daiunji-machi and Seikibashi. Section between Shin-Saidaijimachisuji Station and Daiunji-machi Station was discontinued.

== Others ==
The company has collaborated with Chuggington since 2019, has operated the Chuggington Train, and has used rolling stock that was named after characters in the Chuggington story. Route map for the Chuggington Train.
