= Kamayama Station =

Railway station in Wakayama, Wakayama Prefecture, Japan

Kamayama Station 竈山駅
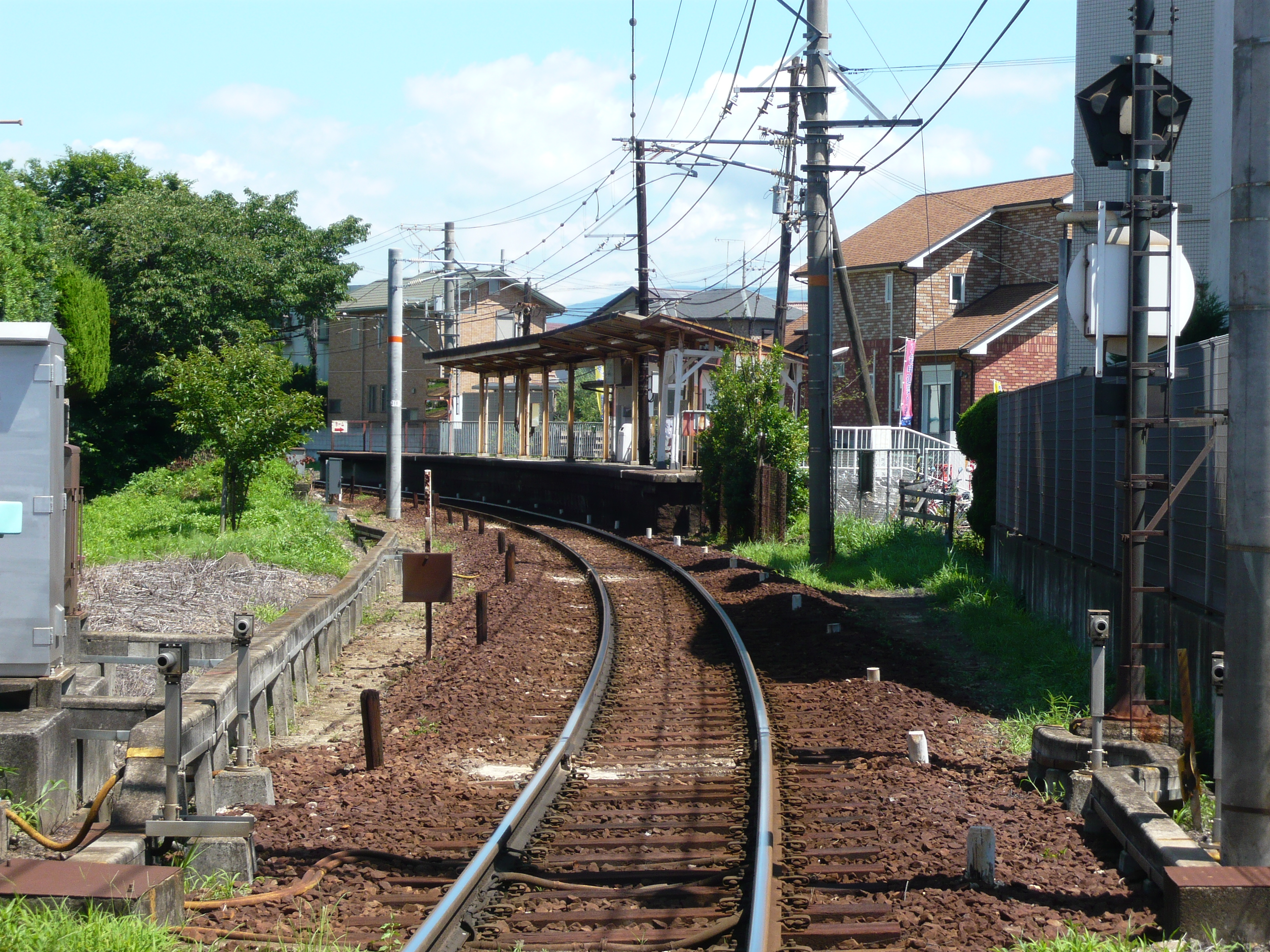
- Station platform taken from a level crossing to the northwest

General information
- Location: Wada, Wakayama-shi, Wakayama-ken, 641-0004; Japan
- Coordinates: 34.2073°N 135.2072°E
- Operator: Wakayama Electric Railway
- Line: ■ Kishigawa Line
- Distance: 3.7 km from Wakayama
- Platforms: 1 side platform

Construction
- Structure type: At-grade

Other information
- Status: Unstaffed
- Station code: 05

History
- Opened: 15 February 1916

Passengers
- FY2017: 529 per day
Location
- Location within Wakayama Prefecture Location within Japan

Kamayama Station (竈山駅, Kamayama eki) is a passenger railway station in located in the city of Wakayama, Wakayama Prefecture, Japan, operated by the private railway company Wakayama Electric Railway.

== Lines ==
Kamayama Station is served by the Kishigawa Line, and is located 3.7 kilometers from the terminus of the line at Wakayama Station.

== Station layout ==
The station consists of one island platform with a level crossing. There is no station building and the station is unattended.

== Adjacent stations ==
«	Service	»
Kishigawa Line
Kōzaki	Local	Kōtsū Center Mae

== History ==
Kamayama Station opened on February 15, 1916.

== Passenger statistics ==
Ridership per day
Year	Ridership
2011	524
2012	519
2013	551
2014	547
2015	564
2016	535
2017	529

== Surrounding Area ==
- Kamayama Shrine

== See also ==
- List of railway stations in Japan
