= Sandō Station =

Railway station in Wakayama, Wakayama Prefecture, Japan

Sandō Station 山東駅
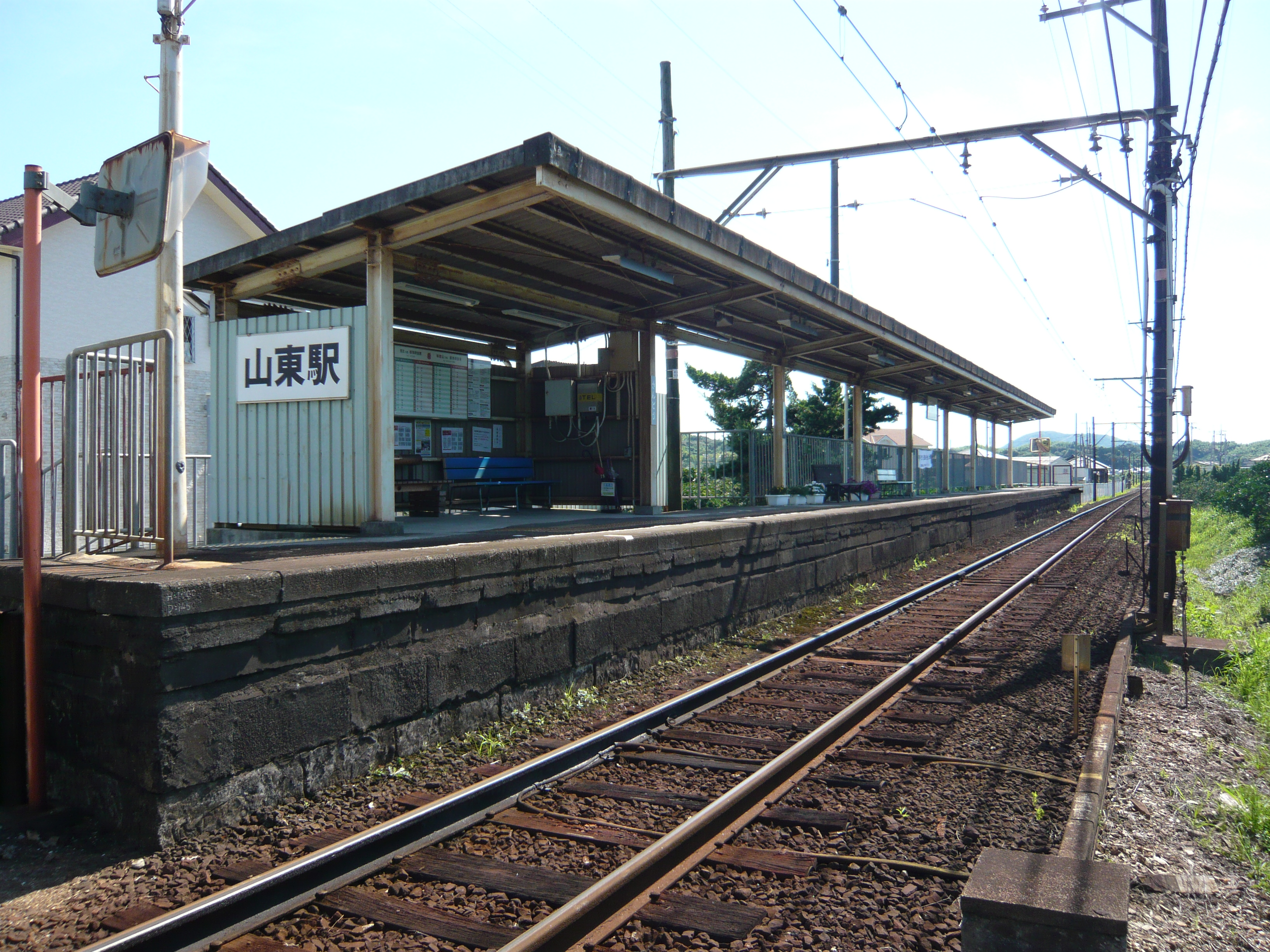
- Sandō Station, July 2011

General information
- Location: Nagayama, Wakayama-shi, Wakayama-ken 640-0302; Japan
- Coordinates: 34.2058°N 135.2625°E
- Operator: Wakayama Electric Railway
- Line: ■ Kishigawa Line
- Distance: 9.1 km from Wakayama
- Platforms: 1 side platform

Construction
- Structure type: At-grade

Other information
- Status: Unstaffed
- Station code: 10

History
- Opened: 18 August 1933
- Former names: Sandō-Nagayama (to 1945)

Passengers
- FY2017: 74 per day
Location
- Location within Wakayama Prefecture Location within Japan

Sandō Station (山東駅, Sandō eki) is a passenger railway station in located in the city of Wakayama, Wakayama Prefecture, Japan, operated by the private railway company Wakayama Electric Railway.

== Lines ==
Sandō Station is served by the Kishigawa Line, and is located 9.1 kilometers from the terminus of the line at Wakayama Station.

== Station layout ==
The station consists of one side platform serving a single bi-directional track. There is no station building and the station is unattended.

== Adjacent stations ==
«	Service	»
Kishigawa Line
Idakiso	Local	Oikeyūen

== History ==
Sandō Station opened on August 18, 1933 as Sandō-Nagayama Station (山東永山駅) . It was renamed to its present name in 1945. The station building was demolished in 1997.

== Passenger statistics ==
Ridership per day
Year	Ridership
2011	117
2012	115
2013	121
2014	121
2015	80
2016	76
2017	74

== Surrounding Area ==
- Wakayama City Hall Higashiyama Higashi Branch
- Wakayama City Higashiyama Higashi Elementary School

== See also ==
- List of railway stations in Japan
