= Ryobi Holdings =

- Native name: 両備ホールディングス株式会社 (Ryobi Holdings Kabushiki Kaisha)
- Type: Transport, Tourism, Logistics, Real Estate Development
- Founded: July 31, 1910
- Headquarters: Okayama City, Japan
- Area served: Worldwide
- Services: Public transportation, tourism, logistics, retail
- Revenue: $1,254,190,000 (2012)
- Number of employees: 2390 (2011)
- Subsidiaries: Okayama Electric Tramway(It has Wakayama Electric Railway and Okaden Bus as one of subsidiaries), Chugoku Bus, Kokusai Ryobi Ferry
- Website: http://www.ryobi-holdings.jp/

Ryobi Holdings Co. Ltd. is a Japanese transport, logistics, travel, retailer, retirement home operator and real estate development company. Its headquarters are in Okayama City, Okayama Prefecture, Japan.

== History ==
The firm was founded in 1910 as Saidaiji Railway. Ryobi entered the bus and taxi business following the discontinuation of its train line in 1962.

In 2005, Ryobi began operation of the Olympia Dream ferry that offers service between Shin Okayama Port and Shodoshima Island.

In 2010 Ryobi launched a bus equipped with photovoltaic panels called Solarve to commemorate the company's 100 year anniversary.

In March 2017 the company launched the Gozabune Atakemaru replica samurai cruise ship that sails in Tokyo Bay.

== Lines of business ==
=== Transport ===
It operates a ferry service between Shin Okayama Port and Shodoshima in the Seto Inland Sea.

It is the operator of both Ryobi and Okaden bus companies. Ryobi provides long distance bus services, charted tours and long-term commuting arrangements with local schools.

It is the parent company of the Okayama Electric Tramway and the Wakayama Electric Railway.

=== Logistics ===
Ryobi is involved in domestic and international shipping with its base in Okayama and offices throughout Japan.

=== Tourism ===
Ryobi Tours is the company's Okayama based travel subsidiary that provides service worldwide. Visit West Japan is a subgroup that focuses on the Chugoku region where the company is based.

Ryobi Holdings operates the 486 ton Gozabune Atakemaru replica samurai cruise ship that sails in Tokyo Bay. Its design was based on ships used during the Tokugawa Shogunate.
