= Okayama Electric Tramway =

Tram system in Chūgoku, Japan

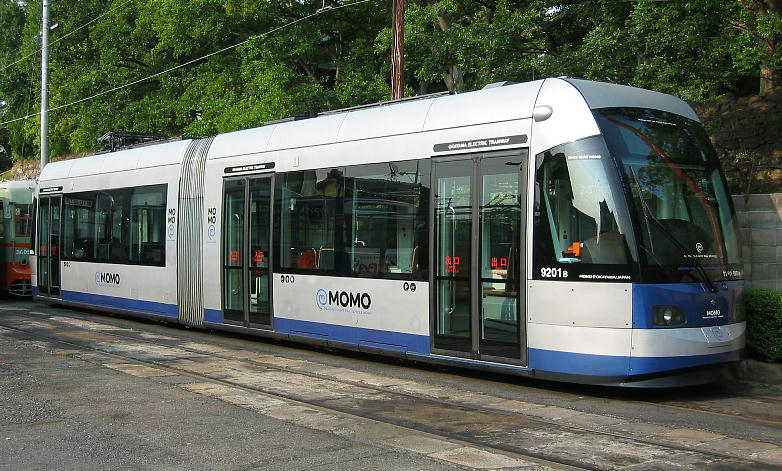
- Type 9200 "MOMO" light rail vehicle

Overview
- Native name: 岡山電気軌道
- Owner: Okayama Electric Tramway Co., Ltd.
- Transit type: Light rail
- Number of lines: 2
- Number of stations: 16
- Headquarters: 2-chome-8-22, Tokichi-cho, Naka-ku; Okayama-shi, Okayama-ken; 703-8291
- Website: http://www.okayama-kido.co.jp/

Operation
- Began operation: 21 May 1910

Technical
- System length: 4.7 km (2.9 mi)
System Map

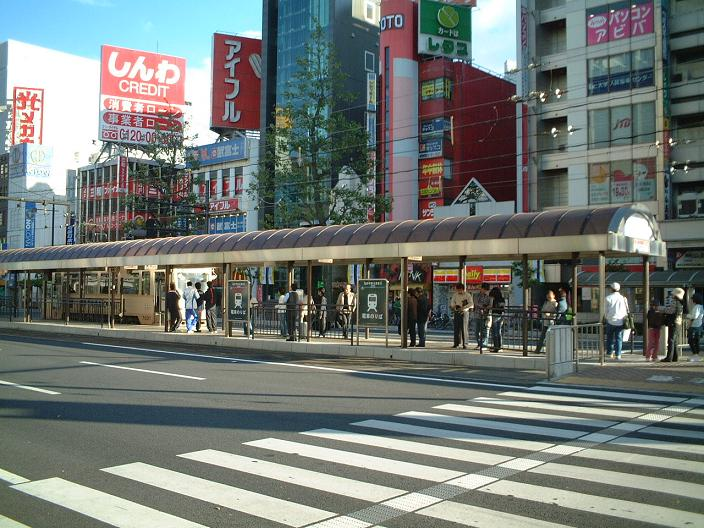
Okayama-Ekimae Station.

Okayama Electric Tramway (岡山電気軌道, Okayama Denki Kidō) is a transportation company in Okayama City, Chūgoku, Japan. The private company operates tram lines and bus lines. The company and its lines are officially abbreviated as Okaden (岡電).

The company was founded in 1910, while its first tram line was opened in 1912. This is one of the few Japanese railway operators that maintained their original corporation names from the foundation in Meiji Period. The company is a core member of the Ryōbi Group, another core member being Ryōbi Bus. From October 1, 2006, together with Ryōbi Bus and Okayama bus company Shimotsui Dentetsu (Shimoden), Okaden introduced Hareca, a smart card ticketing system accepted on trams and buses in Okayama. Okaden also accepts the 10 Nationwide IC Cards including PiTaPa, ICOCA, Suica and PASMO.

== Tram lines ==
At just 4.7 km long, Okaden's tram system is the shortest in Japan.

=== Lines ===
Line	Route	Length	Stops
■ Higashiyama Line	Okayama-Ekimae — Yanagawa — Higashiyama	3.1 km (1.9 mi)	10 *
■ Seikibashi Line	Okayama-Ekimae — Yanagawa — Seikibashi ‡	1.6 km (0.99 mi)	6 †
Totals:		4.7 km (2.9 mi)	16

† Excludes 3 stations listed on Higashiyama Line.

‡ Seikibashi Line is officially Yanagawa — Seikibashi only (1.6 km (0.99 mi)), though all services continue on the Higashiyama Line to/from Okayama-Ekimae.

* Excludes temporary stop Kyobashi Iryujo [ja] which is only used on specific days. It is not listed in company maps/timetables/etc.

== Services ==
As of February 2025, trams operate at the following frequencies:

	Weekdays			Weekends & Holidays		
	Morning Peak	Daytime & Afternoon Peak	Evening	Before 09:00	Daytime	Evening
Higashiyama Line	5 minutes	6 minutes	10-15 minutes	6-9 minutes	6 minutes	10-15 minutes
Seikibashi Line	12 minutes	12 minutes	20 minutes	12 minutes	12 minutes	20 minutes

Higashiyama Line has running time of 16-24 minutes, operating between approx. 06:00 and 22:00 every day.

Seikibashi Line has running time of 13-18 minutes, operating between approx 06:30 and 21:30 every day.

== Fares ==
As of April 2026, Fares are ¥160 (¥80 for children under 12yo) regardless of distance travelled.

1-day passes costing ¥400 (¥200 for children under 12yo) are available onboard trams, at sales outlets or by using the RYDE PASS smartphone app.

Fares can be paid for using cash (paid when exiting the tram), any of the 10 Nationwide Mutual Usage Service IC Cards (PiTaPa, ICOCA, Suica, PASMO, etc.) or Hareca card (Okayama tram/bus IC card). Commuter and student passes are also available.

== Chuggington Tram ==
Since March 16, 2019, Okaden operates a special tramcar representing Wilson and Brewster from Chuggington, a British animated children's TV series. Built by Niigata Transys in 2018, it is a low-floor articulated tram based on the design of the existing Okaden 9200 series trams but with extensive modifications including fibreglass mouldings to represent a locomotive, raised driving position & driver's windows and custom-shaped windows. Designed by Eiji Mitooka, the tram interior features children's play areas, special seating and video screens playing Chuggington videos.

Chuggington Tram operates similar to a tourist train, with tickets sold for a designated tour travelling on both of the company's tram lines. Ticket information is available at the Okaden Chuggington Tram website. Tours commence at Okayama Ekimae (tram stop opposite Okayama Station) and terminate at Higashiyama, adjacent to the Okaden Chuggington Museum. Tour tickets include entry to Okaden Chuggington Museum as well as a 1-day tram pass.

Chuggington Tram only operates specified tours (as well as being available for private hire) and does not operate any regular passenger services.

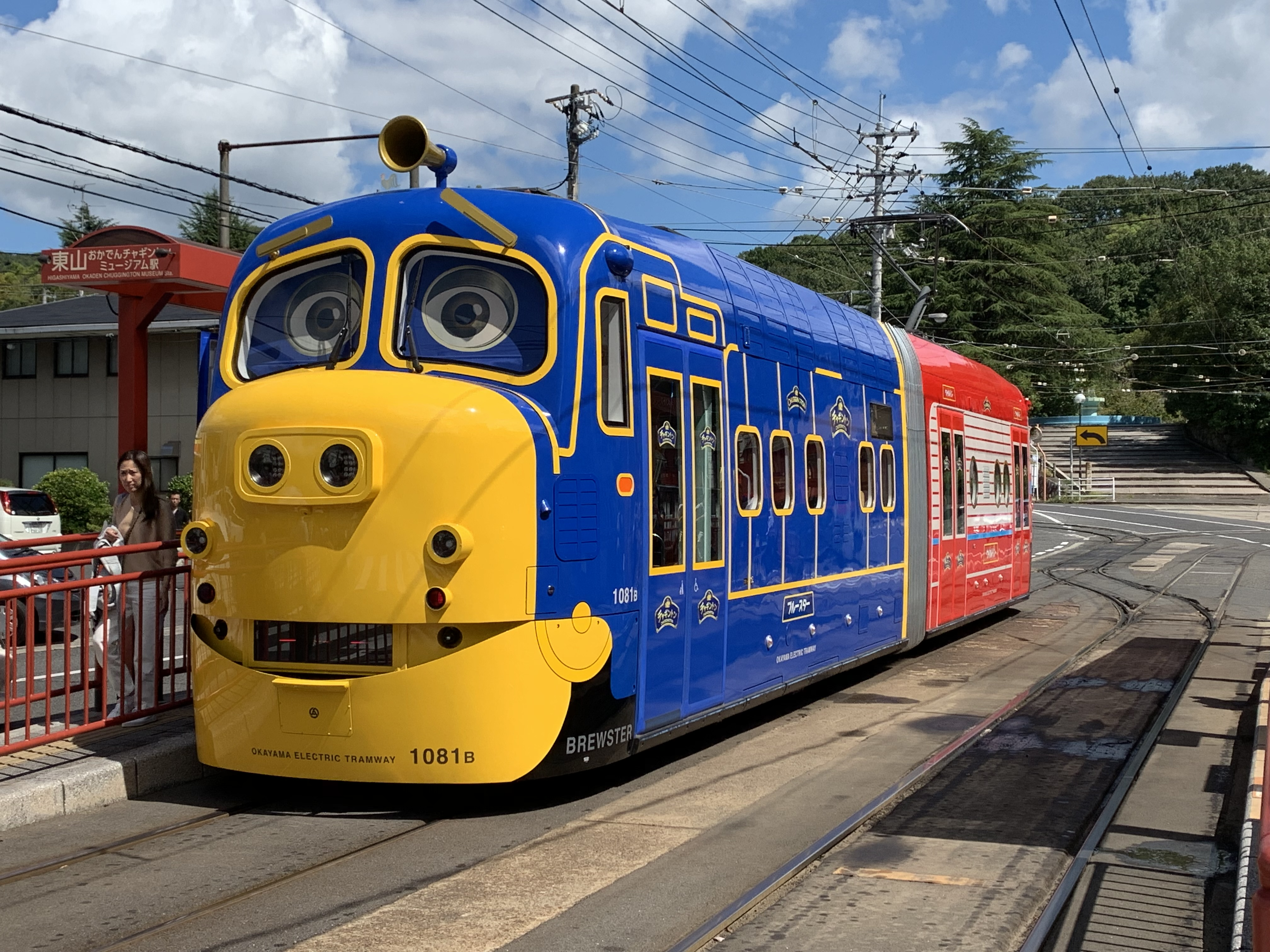
Okaden Chuggington tram - Brewster

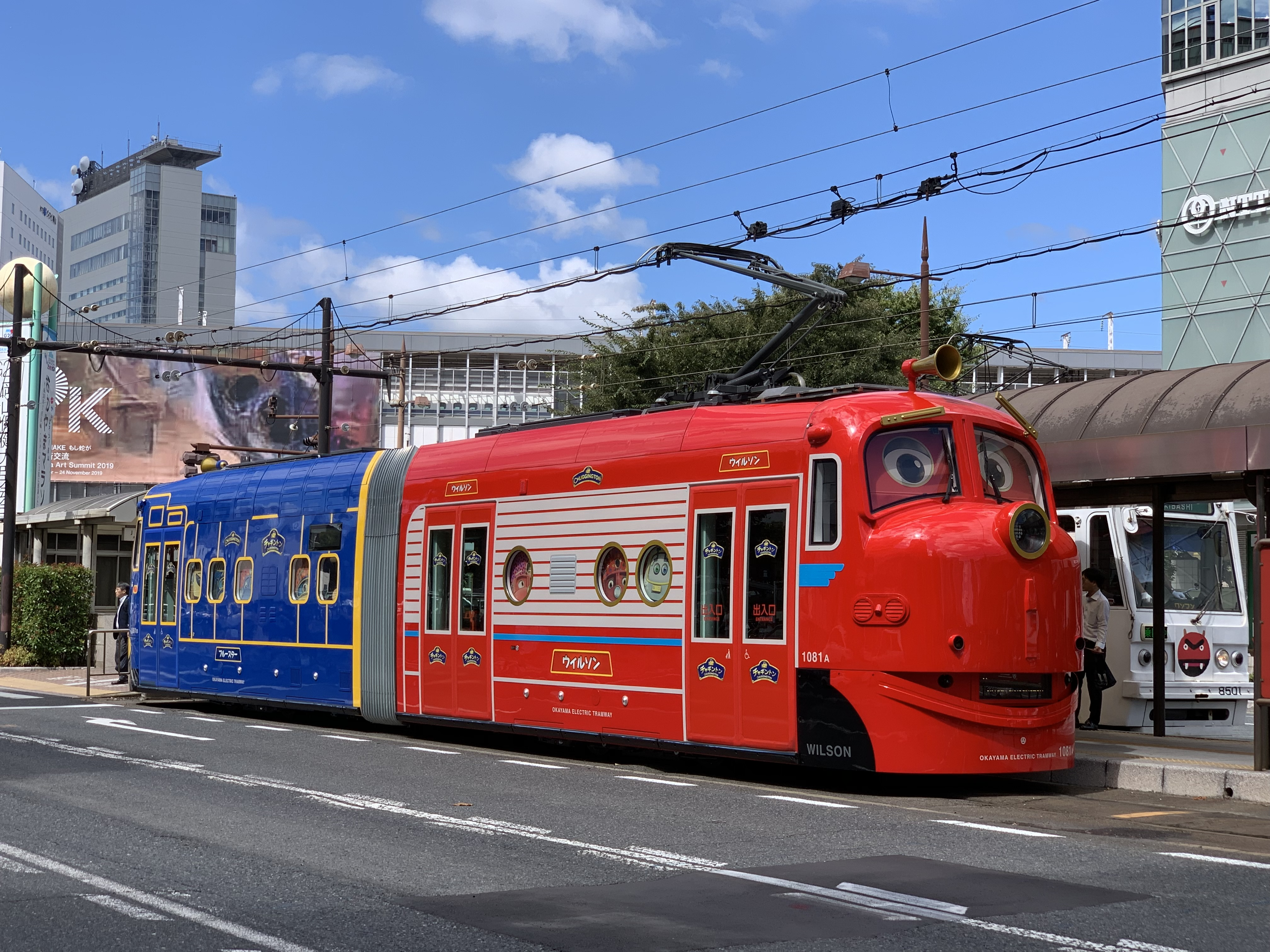
Okaden Chuggington tram - Wilson

== Bus lines ==
Generally speaking, Okaden operates lines with shorter distances within Okayama City, while Ryōbi Bus operates lines with longer distances. They also operate limousine buses linking Okayama Station and Okayama Airport, while Okaden Express is a highway bus that links Okayama and Kōbe / Kōbe Airport.

== Supporting other railway lines ==
Okaden is known for its active stance to try to support other railway lines, when their operators announced to close them. So far, they have considered supporting 4 lines of Meitetsu (Gifu City Line, Ibi Line, Minomachi Line, and Tagami Line), as well as Hitachi Dentetsu Line, Nankai Kishigawa Line, and Hokkaidō Chihoku Kōgen Railway Furusato Ginga Line. Among them, they succeeded to support Kishigawa Line, now operated by Wakayama Electric Railroad, their subsidiary company.

== See also ==
- List of light-rail transit systems
