= Tanakaguchi Station =

Railway station in Wakayama, Wakayama Prefecture, Japan

Tanakaguchi Station 田中口駅
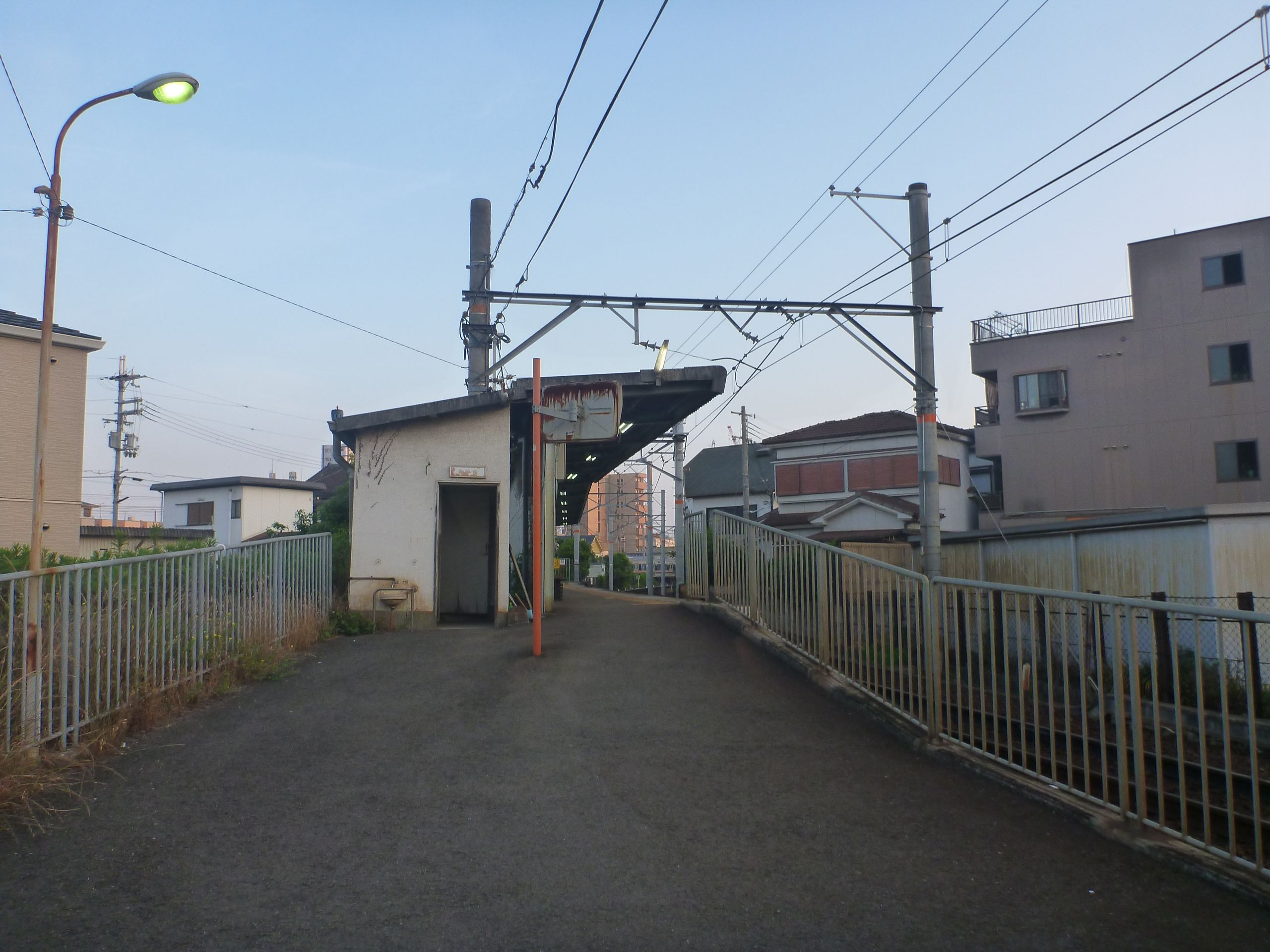
- Tanakaguchi Station entrance, June 2013

General information
- Location: Oda, Wakayama-shi, Wakayama-ken, 640-8323; Japan
- Coordinates: 34°13′37.71″N 135°11′34.92″E
- Operator: Wakayama Electric Railway
- Line: ■ Kishigawa Line
- Distance: 0.6 km from Wakayama
- Platforms: 1 side platform

Construction
- Structure type: At-grade

Other information
- Status: Unstaffed
- Station code: 02

History
- Opened: 15 June 1924

Passengers
- FY2017: 173 per day
Location
- Location within Wakayama Prefecture Location within Japan

Tanakaguchi Station (田中口駅, Tanakaguchi eki) is a passenger railway station in located in the city of Wakayama, Wakayama Prefecture, Japan, operated by the private railway company Wakayama Electric Railway.

== Lines ==
Tanakaguchi Station is served by the Kishigawa Line, and is located 0.6 kilometers from the terminus of the line at Wakayama Station.

== Station layout ==
The station consists of one island platform with a level crossing. There is no station building and the station is unattended.

== Adjacent stations ==
«	Service	»
Kishigawa Line
Wakayama	Local	Nichizengū

== History ==
Tanakaguchi Station opened on June 15, 1924.

== Passenger statistics ==
Ridership per day
Year	Ridership
2011	160
2012	159
2013	168
2014	167
2015	185
2016	175
2017	173

== Surrounding Area ==
- Wakayama Prefectural Office
- Raigo-ji temple

== See also ==
- List of railway stations in Japan
