= Nishiyamaguchi Station =

Railway station in Kinokawa, Wakayama Prefecture, Japan

Nishiyamaguchi Station 西山口駅
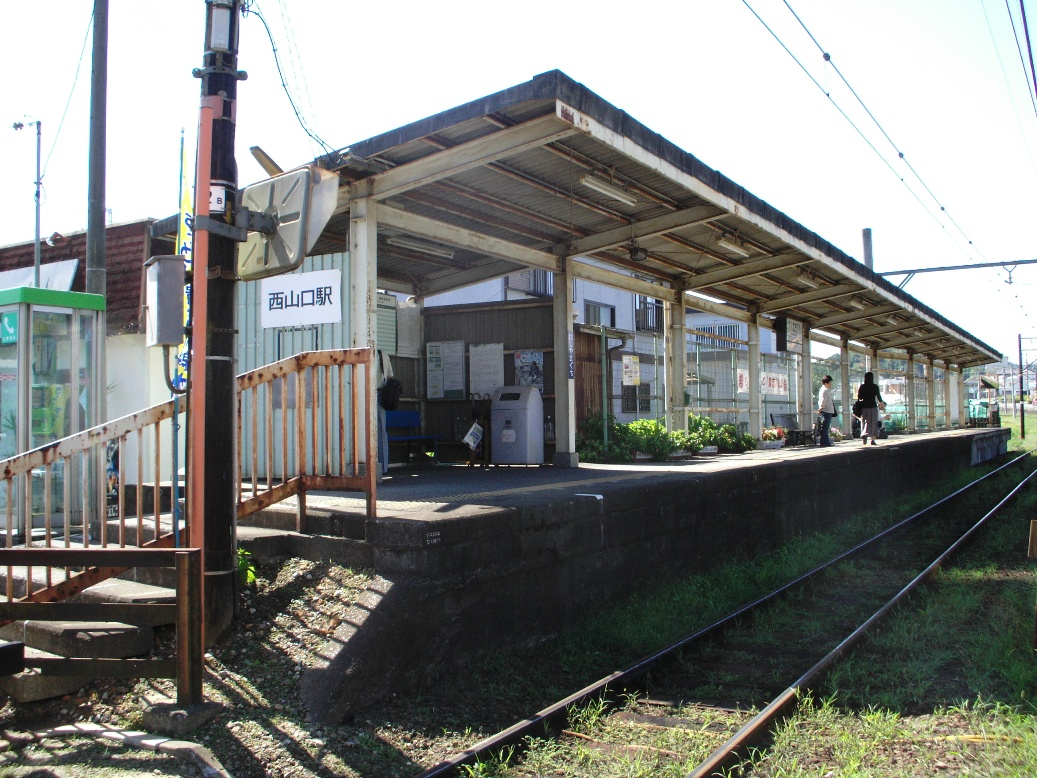
- Nishiyamaguchi Station, October 2007

General information
- Location: Kishigawacho Nagayama, Kinokawa-shi, Wakayama-ken 640-0416; Japan
- Coordinates: 34.2097°N 135.2913°E
- Operator: Wakayama Electric Railway
- Line: ■ Kishigawa Line
- Distance: 12.1 km from Wakayama
- Platforms: 1 side platform

Construction
- Structure type: At-grade

Other information
- Status: Unstaffed
- Station code: 12

History
- Opened: 18 August 1933

Passengers
- FY2017: 290 per day (2017)
Location
- Location within Wakayama Prefecture Location within Japan

Nishiyamaguchi Station (西山口駅, Nishiyamaguchi-eki) is a passenger railway station located in the city of Kinokawa, Wakayama Prefecture, Japan, operated by the private railway company Wakayama Electric Railway.

== Lines ==
Nishiyamaguchi Station is served by the Kishigawa Line, and is located 12.1 kilometers from the terminus of the line at Wakayama Station.

== Station layout ==
The station consists of one side platform. The station building was demolished in 1996 and there is now only a weather shelter on the platform. The station is unattended.

== Adjacent stations ==
«	Service	»
Kishigawa Line
Oikeyūen	Local	Kanrojimae

== History ==
Nishiyamaguchi Station opened on August 18, 1933.

== Passenger statistics ==
Ridership per day
Year	Ridership
2011	334
2012	329
2013	351
2014	349
2015	308
2016	293
2017	290

== Surrounding area ==
- Nagayama housing complex

== See also ==
- List of railway stations in Japan
