= Kamayama Shrine =

Shinto shrine in the city of Wakayama, Wakayama Prefecture, Japan

- 竈山神社
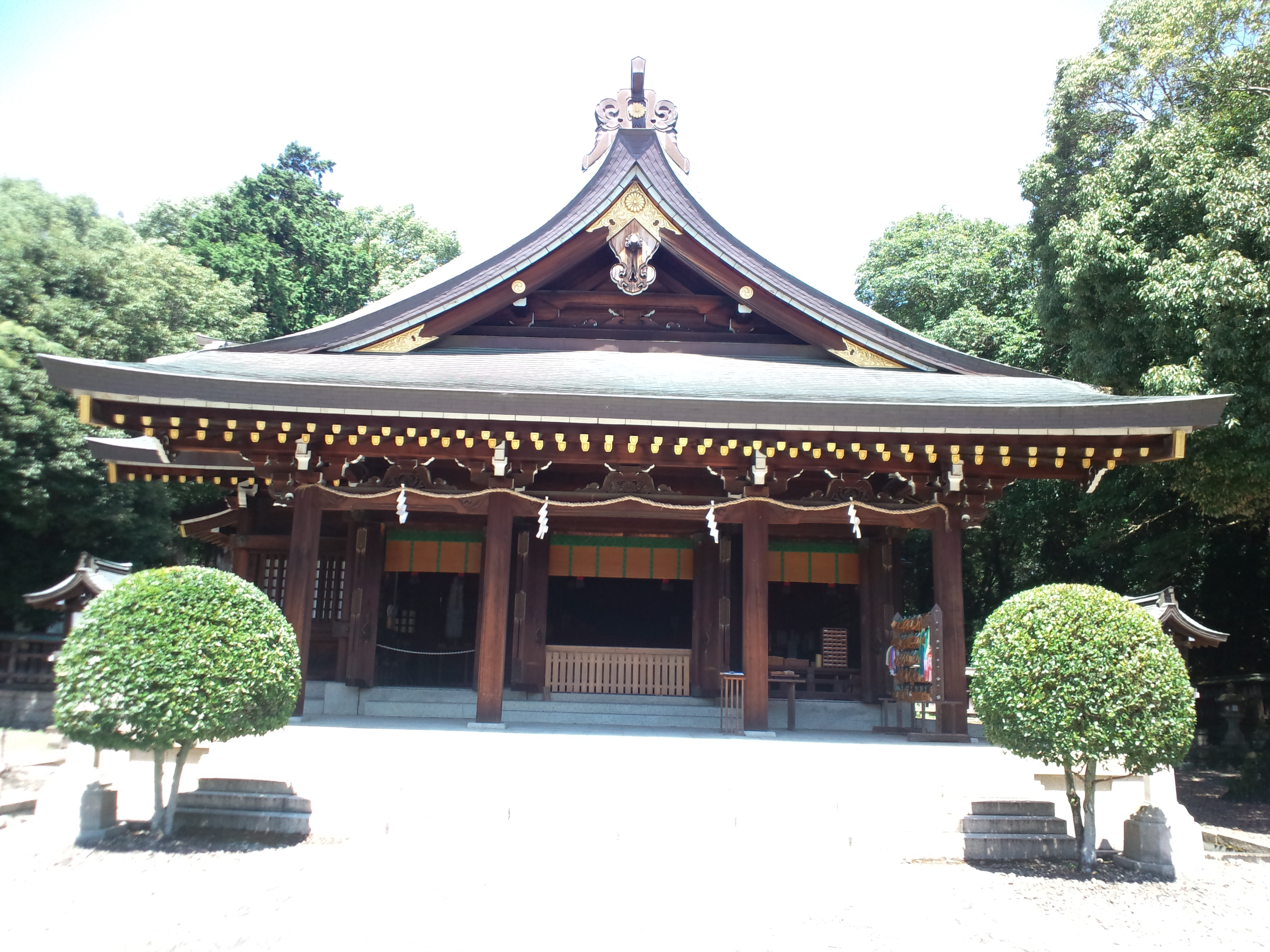
- Kamayama Jinja Haiden

- Kamayama Jinja Kamayama Shrine (Japan)

Religion
- Affiliation: Shinto
- Deity: Itsuse no Mikoto
- Festival: October 13.

Location
- Location: 438 Wada, Wakayama-shi, Wakayama-ken
- Interactive map of Kamayama Shrine
- Coordinates: 34.2009°N 135.2046°E

Architecture
- Style: Kasuga-zukuri

Website
- Official website

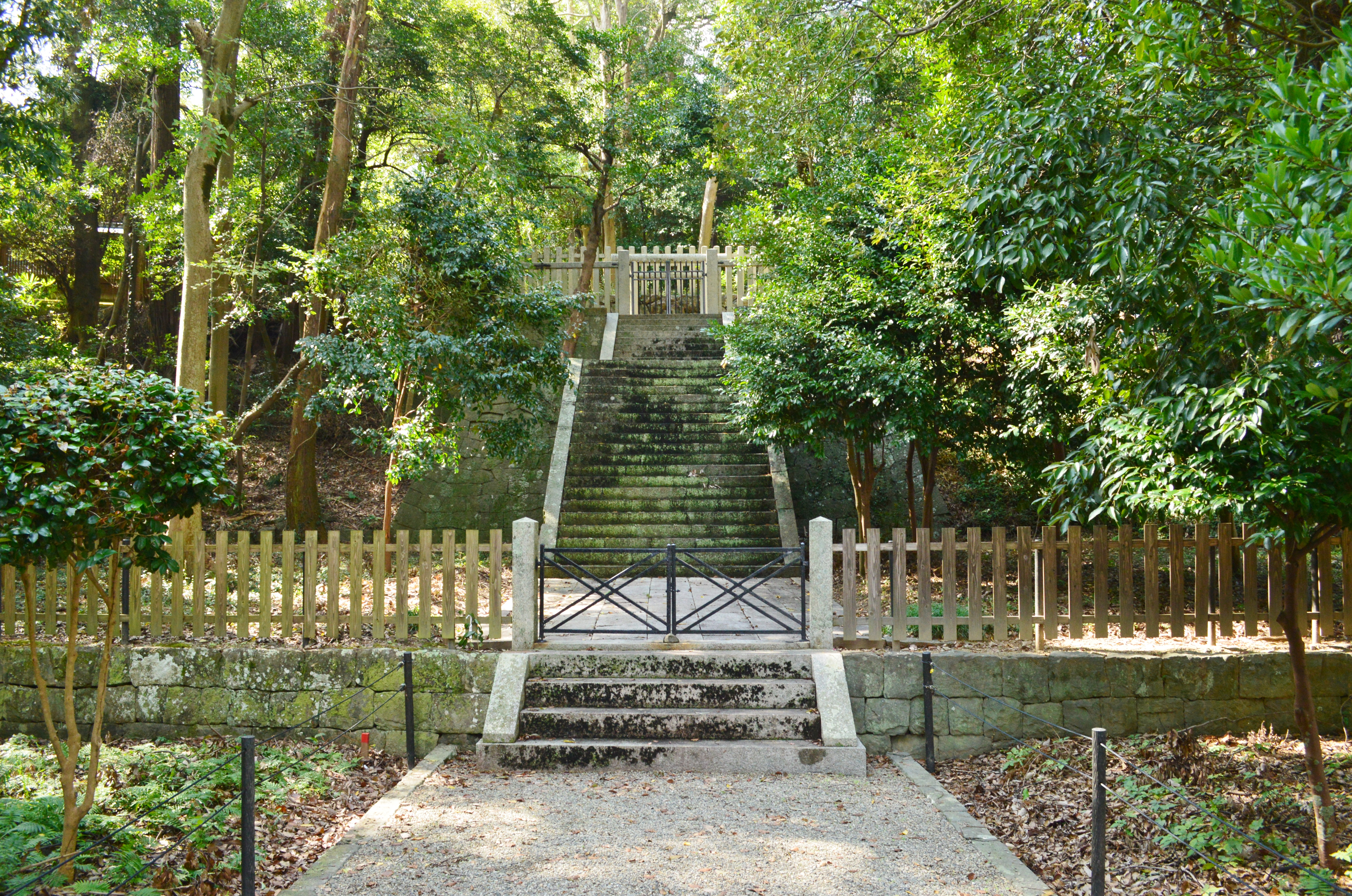
Kamayama Kofun

Kamayama Shrine (竈山神社, Kamayama jinja) is a Shinto shrine in the city of Wakayama, Wakayama Prefecture, Japan.

== History ==
The main kami enshrined at the Kamayama Shrine is Itsuse no Mikoto (彦五瀬命), the eldest brother of Emperor Jimmu, the legendary first emperor of Japan. Per the Kojiki and the Nihon Shoki, during Jimmu's Eastern Expedition to conquer the Yamato Basin, Jimmu and his brothers forces advanced up the Seto Inland Sea and landed near Naniwa. They faced stiff resistance from a local king named Nagamitsu-hiko and during the ensuing battle Itsuse no Mikoto was struck by an arrow. He advised his brothers that since they were the descendants of Amaterasu, the sun goddess, it was inauspicious that they fight towards the rising sun, and urged that the army should circle around and attack Nagamitsu-hiko from behind (i.e. towards the west). The army thus turned south into the Kii Peninsula, but Itsuse no Mikoto's wound worsened, and he died at a place called "Kameyama", where his burial mound was built.

As all documentary records of Kameyama Shrine were lost during the Sengoku period when Toyotomi Hideyoshi's forces invaded Kii Province, the foundation of the shrine is uncertain. Its name appears in the Engishiki records dated 927 AD, by which time it was a substantial shrine, and the kofun located behind the Honden had been identified as the tomb of Itsuse no Mikoto by the Imperial household. In records dated 1381, the head kannushi of the shrine was a hereditary position held by the Ukai family, who claimed to be descendants of the Kofun period kuni no miyatsuko of Kii Province. The shrine was destroyed in 1585 by Toyotomi Hideyoshi, and restored in 1600 by Asano Yoshinaga, albeit on a much smaller scale. In 1669 Tokugawa Yorinobu, the first daimyō of Kishū Domain sponsored the rebuilding of the Honden and surrounding structures; however, throughout the Edo Period, the shrine was under the control of the domain's jisha-bugyō and had no parishioners or outside sources of income.

Following the Meiji restoration, the shrine was initially accorded the rank of village shrine under the modern system of ranked Shinto shrines in 1873. However, with the development of State Shinto and increasing emphasis on Emperor Jimmu, the shrine was promoted to Imperial Shrine, 2nd rank (官幣中社, Kanpei Chūsha) in 1885 and then to Imperial Shrine, 1st rank (官幣大社, Kanpei-taisha) in 1915. It is the only example of a shrine which was promoted from the lowest rank to the highest range in the ranking system. The shrine was extensively remodeled in 1938.

The Kameyama Tomb (竈山墓) is a circular-type (empun (円墳)) kofun, with a height of one meter and diameter of six meters, located on a hill with an elevation of nine meters. As it has been designated as an imperial tomb by the Imperial Household Agency, archaeological excavation has been prohibited.

== Gallery ==
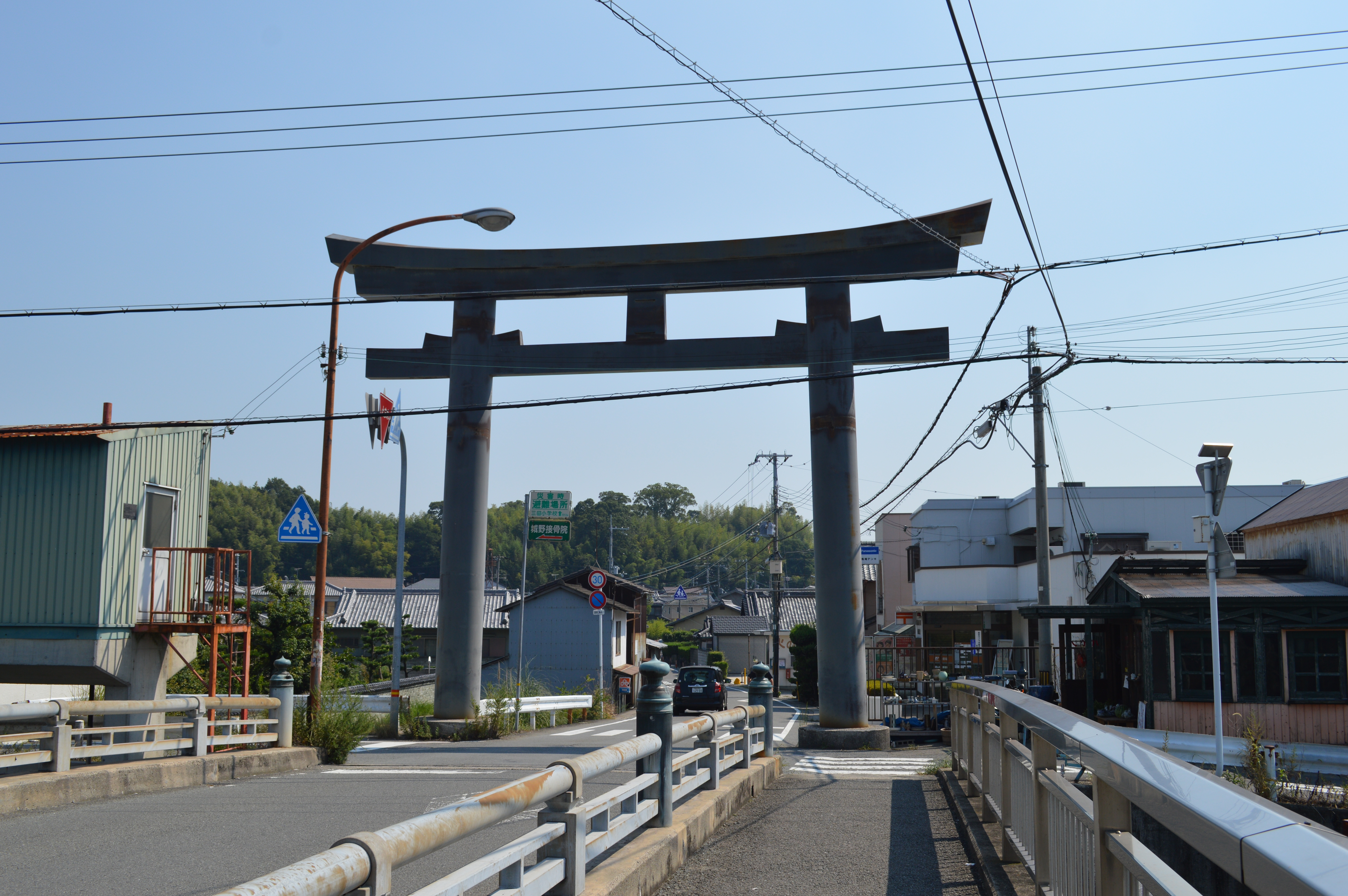
Ō-Torii

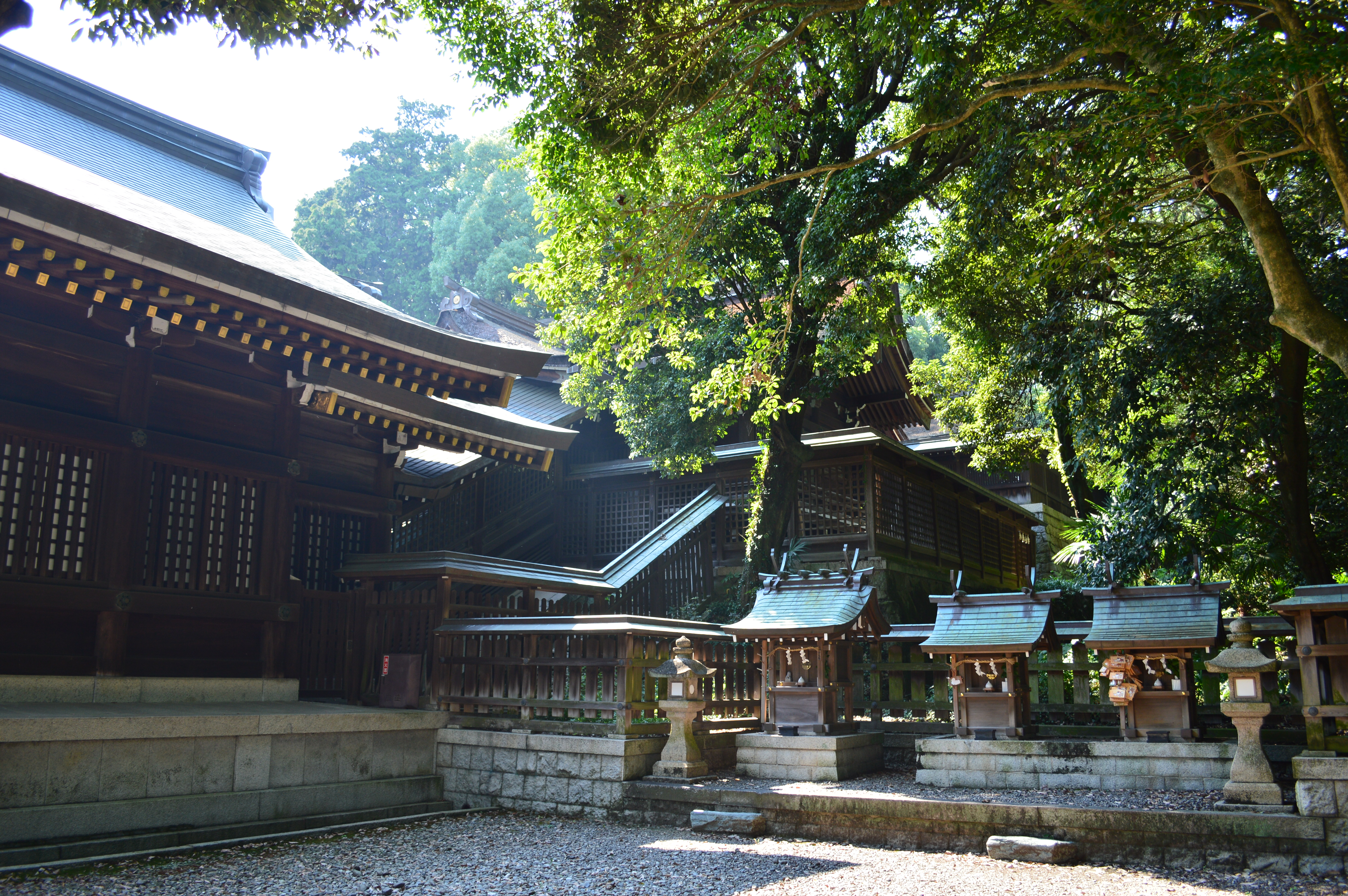
Shaden

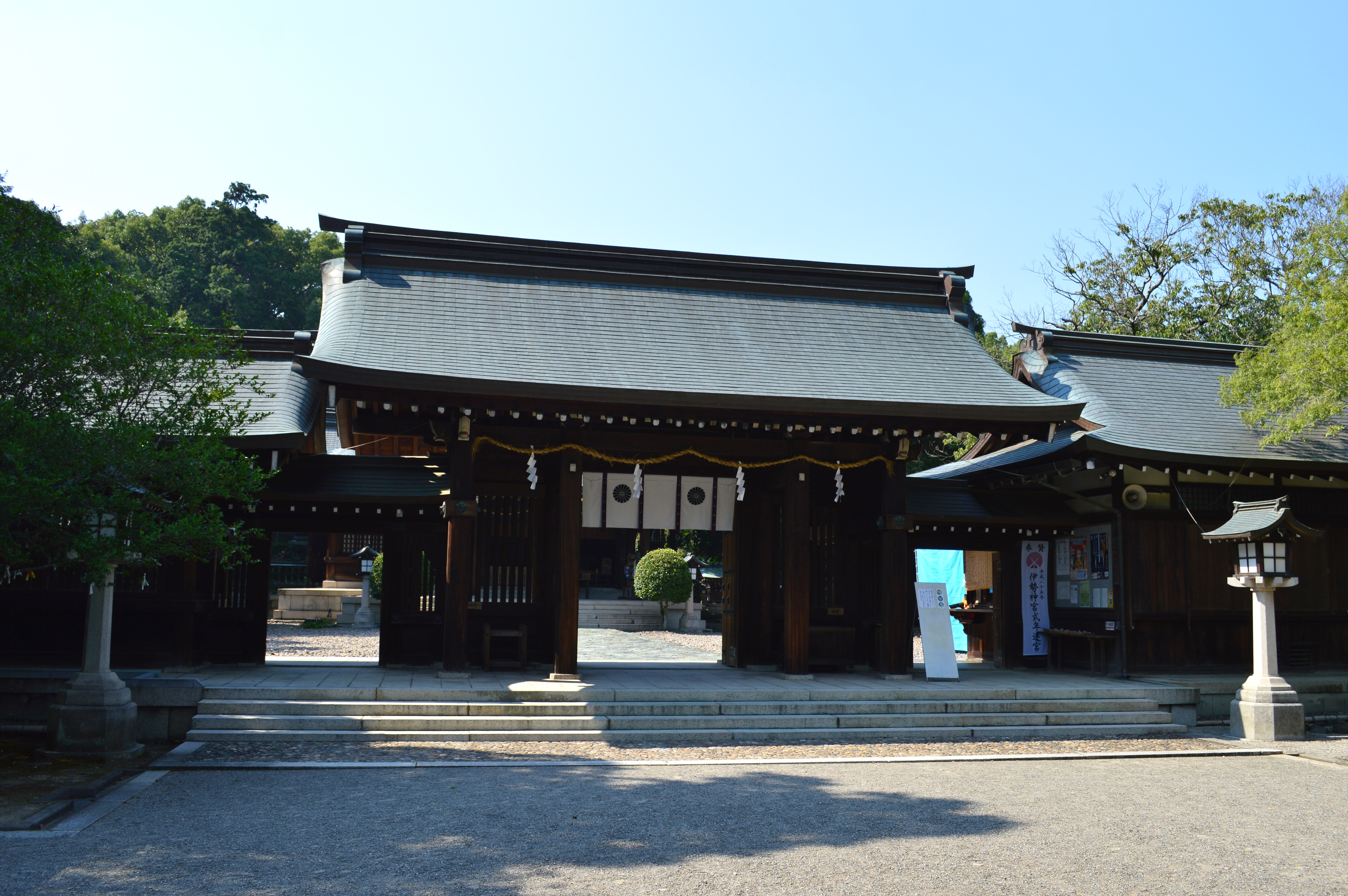
Gate

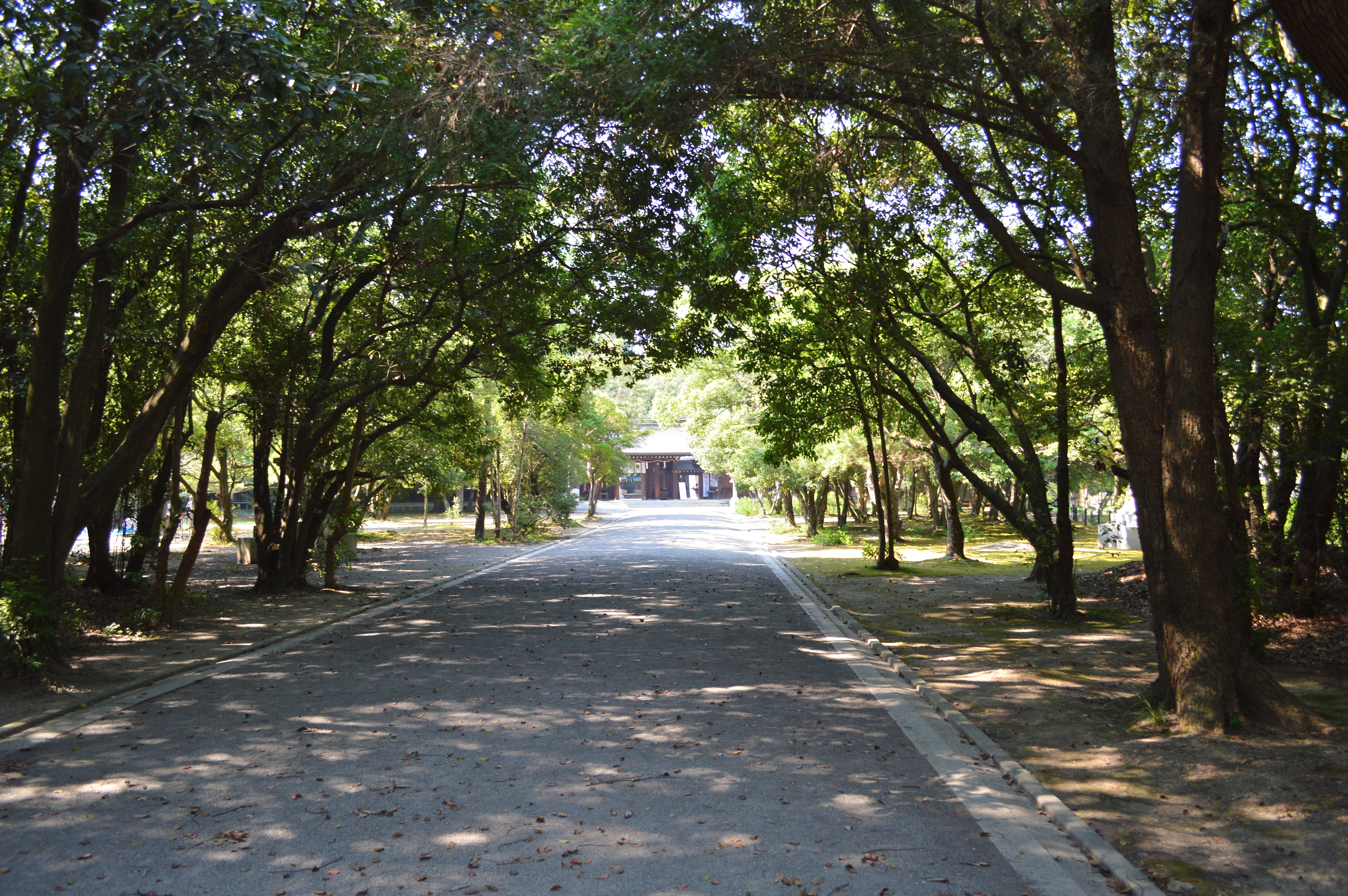
Approach

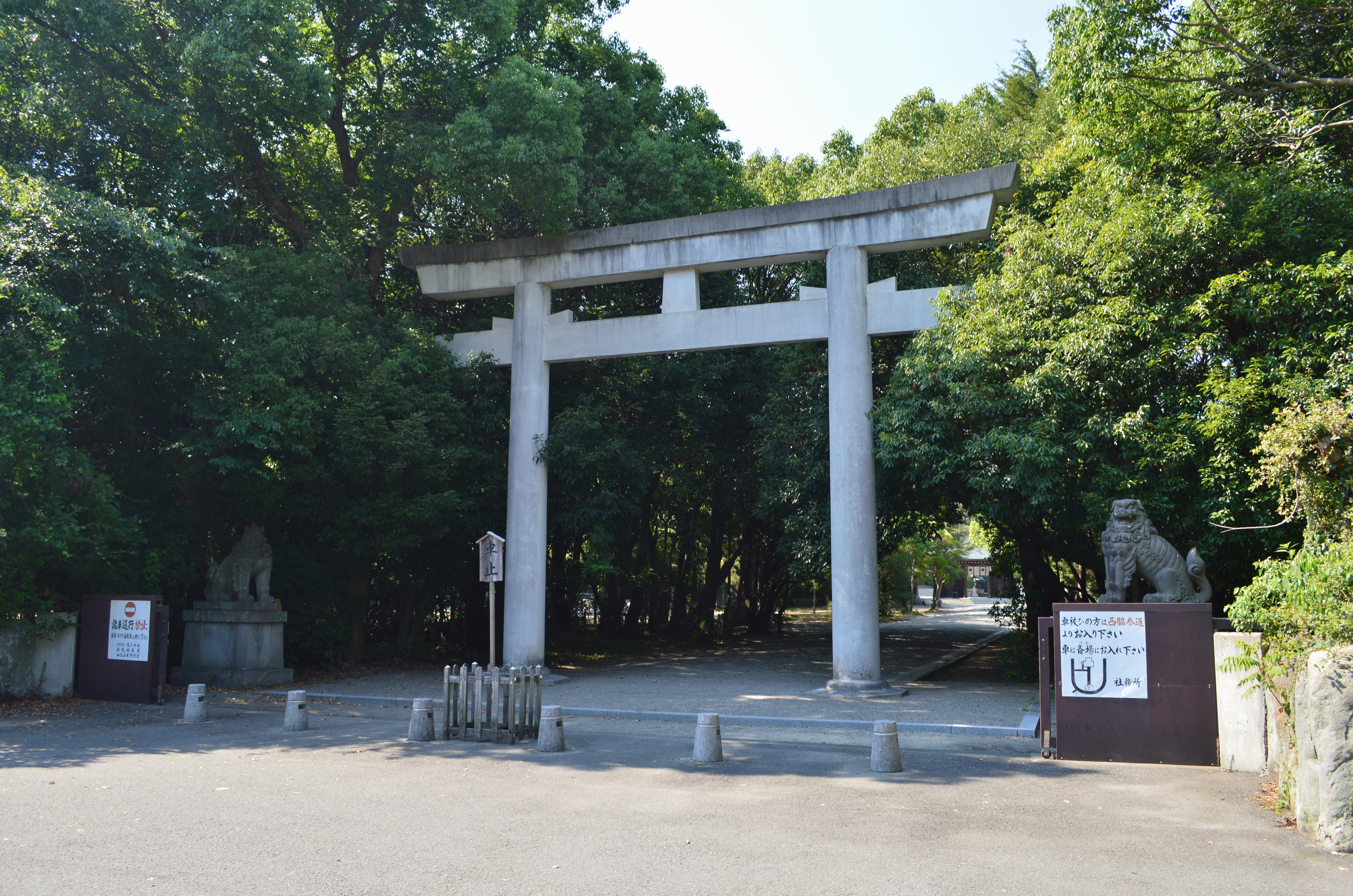
Torii

== Transportation ==
The shrine can be reached by Kamayama Station on the Wakayama Electric Railway Kishigawa Line.
