= Kōtsū Center Mae Station =

Railway station in Wakayama, Wakayama Prefecture, Japan

Kōtsū Center Mae Station 交通センター前駅
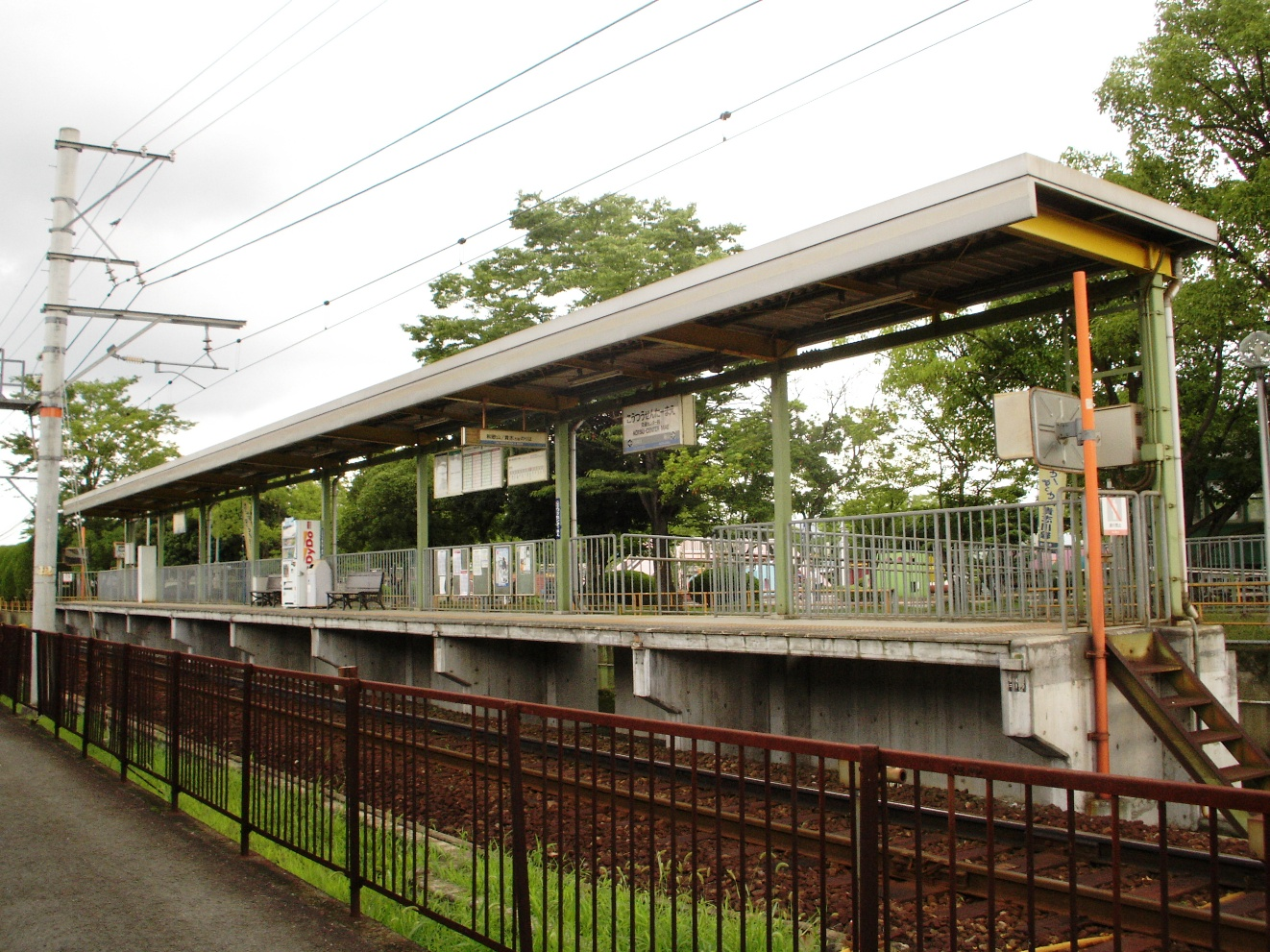

General information
- Location: Nishi, Wakayama-shi, Wakayama-ken, 640-8313; Japan
- Coordinates: 34.2039°N 135.2181°E
- Operator: Wakayama Electric Railway
- Line: ■ Kishigawa Line
- Distance: 4.8 km from Wakayama
- Platforms: 1 side platform

Construction
- Structure type: At-grade

Other information
- Status: Unstaffed
- Station code: 06

History
- Opened: 7 May 1999

Passengers
- FY2017: 238 per day
Location
- Location within Wakayama Prefecture Location within Japan

Kōtsū Center Mae Station (交通センター前駅, Kōtsū Sentā Maeeki) is a passenger railway station in located in the city of Wakayama, Wakayama Prefecture, Japan, operated by the private railway company Wakayama Electric Railway.

== Lines ==
Kōtsū Center Mae Station is served by the Kishigawa Line, and is located 4.8 kilometers from the terminus of the line at Wakayama Station.

== Station layout ==
The station consists of one side platform serving single bi-directional track. The station is unattended.

== Adjacent stations ==
«	Service	»
Kishigawa Line
Kamayama	Local	Okazakimae

== History ==
Kōtsū Center Mae Station opened on May 7, 1999

== Passenger statistics ==
Ridership per day
Year	Ridership
2011	339
2012	340
2013	358
2014	359
2015	259
2016	243
2017	238

== Surrounding area ==
- Wakayama Prefectural Police Headquarters Transportation Center
- Wakayama Prefectural Wakayama Kotsu Park
- Wakayama City Hall Okazaki Branch

== See also ==
- List of railway stations in Japan
