= Hareca =

Contactless smart card system in Okayama, Japan

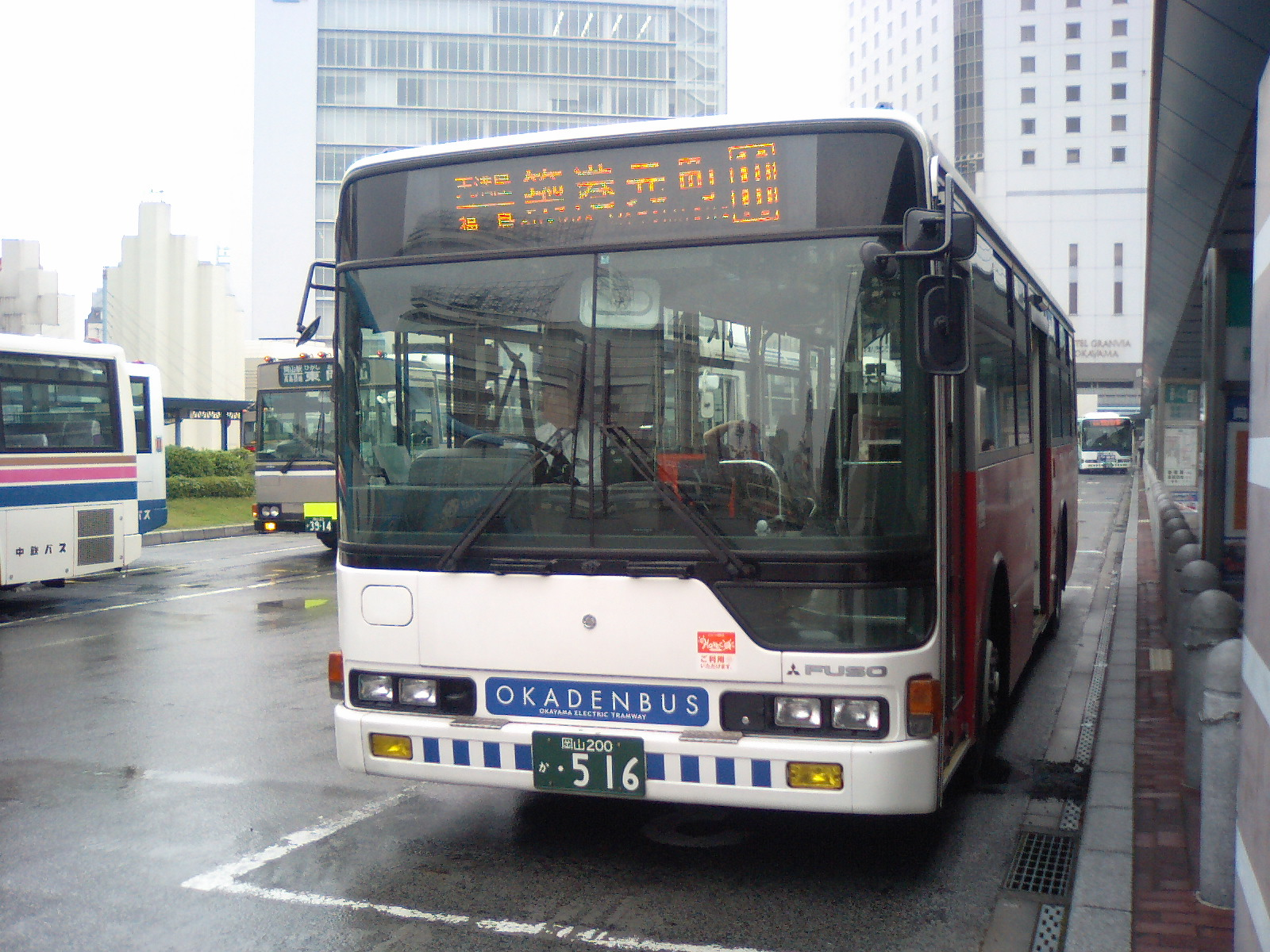
Okaden bus with a "Hareca usable" sticker

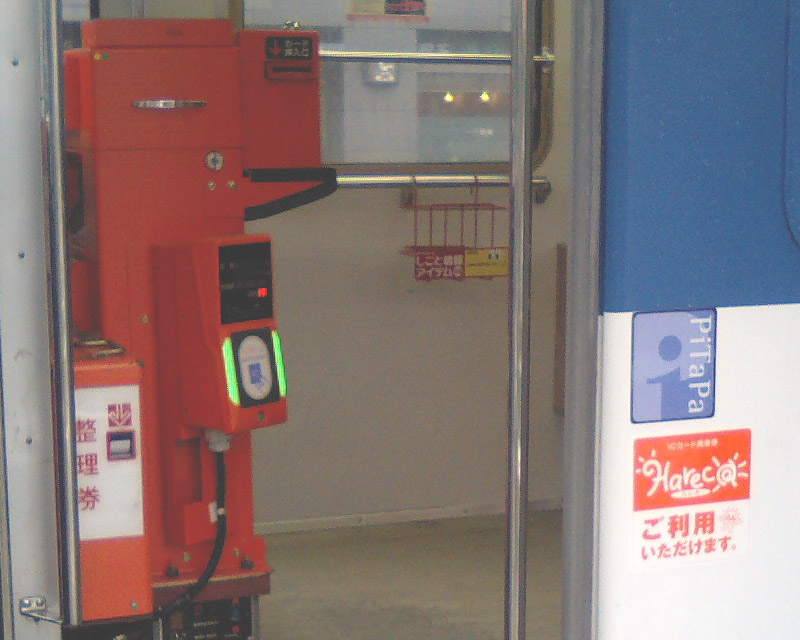
Okaden tramcar with a card reader and stickers

Hareca (ハレカ, Hareka) is a rechargeable contactless smart card ticketing system for public transport in Okayama, Japan, introduced by Okayama Electric Tramway (Okaden), Ryōbi Bus, and Shimotsui Dentetsu (Shimoden), from October 1, 2006. The name comes from hare (sunny weather) and card, meaning the card for Okayama, the sunny city. Just like JR East's Suica or JR West's ICOCA, the card uses RFID technology developed by Sony corporation known as FeliCa.

As of October 2006, the card is usable for all the tramway lines by Okayama Electric Tramway, as well as 55 bus lines by the three operators for Okayama, Kurashiki, and Tamano. Within autumn, 2007, the card will be usable for all the bus lines by the operators. There also is a plan to introduce the card to other bus operators in Okayama.

At the same time Hareca was introduced, the three operators also introduced PiTaPa, meaning the latter card is also usable in those lines. However, Hareca cannot be used in PiTaPa-accepting area, as the former has its unique function, such as premium service (discounts). As PiTaPa and ICOCA have integrated services, ICOCA is also usable in Hareca-accepting area. As of December 2006, however, ICOCA cannot be recharged in the area.

== Types of cards ==
- Blank card
- Registered card
- Children's card
- Memorial card
