= Kōzaki Station =

Kōzaki Station can refer to the following train stations in Japan:

- Kōzaki Station (Ōita) (幸崎駅), operated by JR Kyushu
- Kōzaki Station (Wakayama) (神前駅), operated by Wakayama Electric Railway
