= Ganlu Temple (Zhenjiang) =

Buddhist temple in Jingkou District, Zhenjiang, China

- 甘露寺
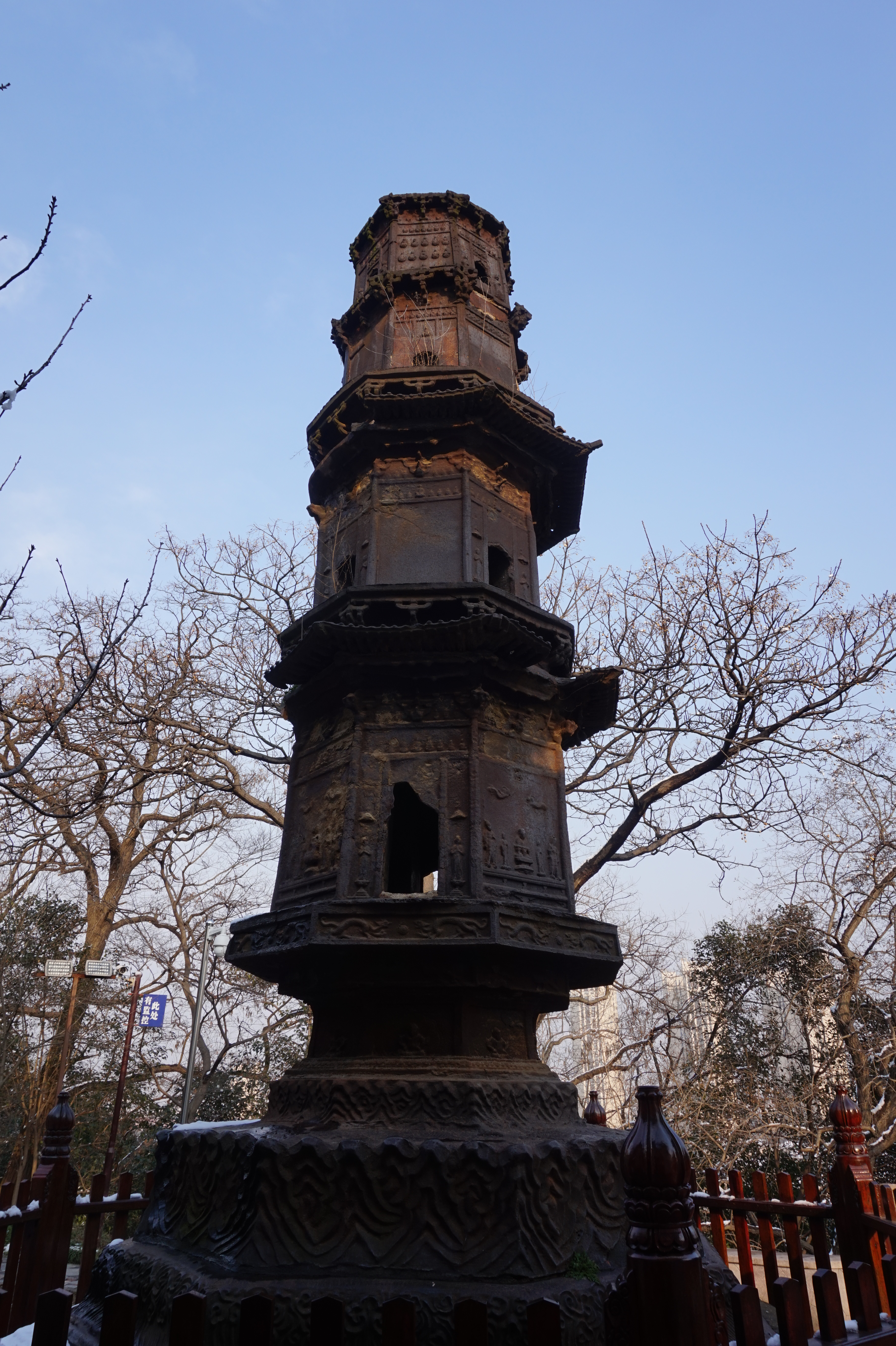

- Location within Jiangsu

Religion
- Affiliation: Buddhism
- Sect: Chan Buddhism

Location
- Location: Jingkou District, Zhenjiang, Jiangsu
- Country: China
- Interactive map of Ganlu Temple
- Coordinates: 32°13′24″N 119°27′51″E

Architecture
- Style: Chinese architecture
- Established: 256

Ganlu Temple (Chinese: 甘露寺; pinyin: Gānlù Sì) is a Buddhist temple located on Mount Beigu, in Jingkou District of Zhenjiang, Jiangsu, China.

== History ==
The original temple dates back to 256, under the Eastern Wu (222–280).

== Architecture ==
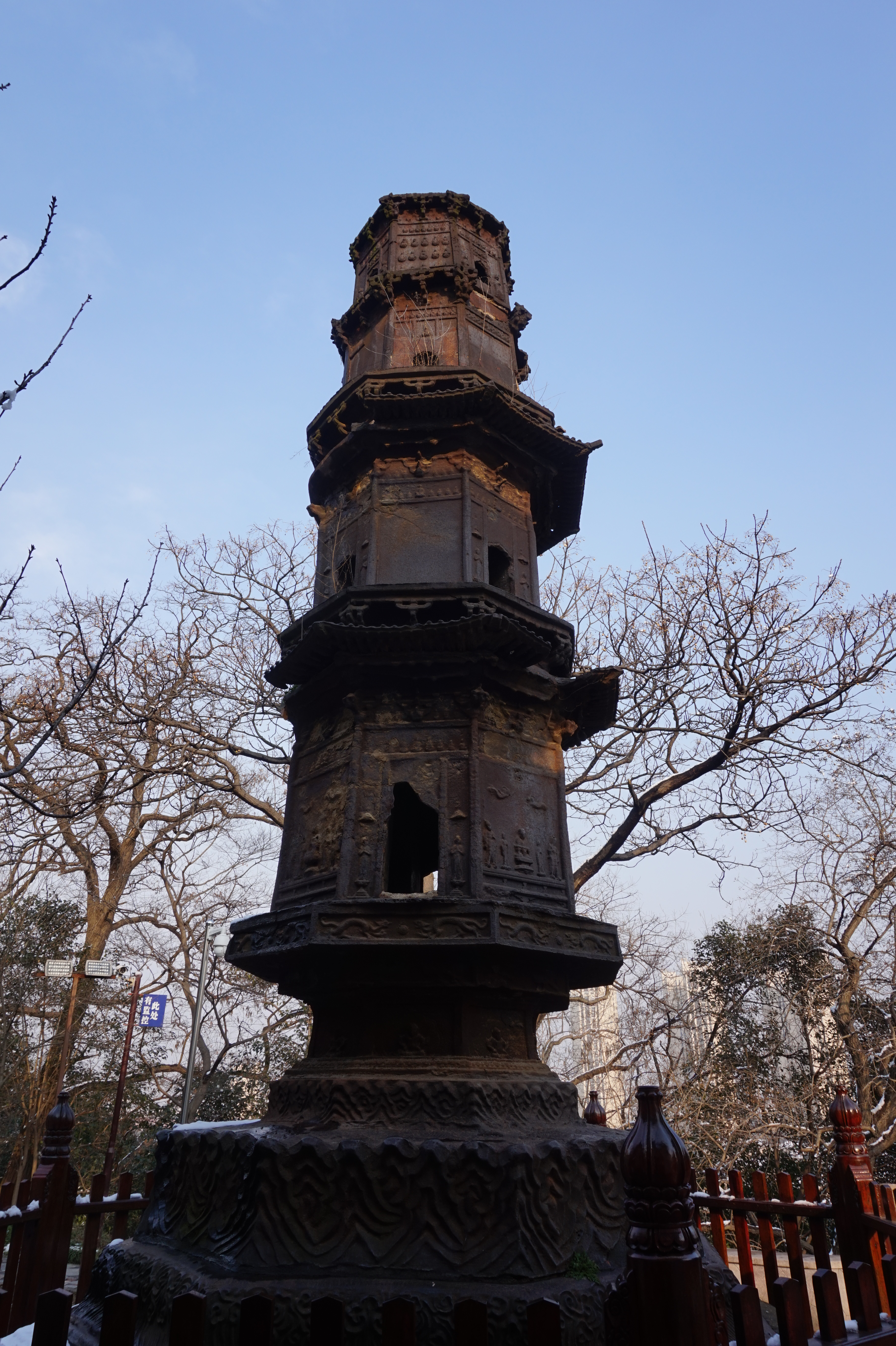
Iron Pagoda in Ganlu Temple.

=== Iron Pagoda ===
The Iron Pagoda was first built in 825 by Li Deyu, the Duke of Wei in the early Tang dynasty (618–907). In 1078, in the reign of Emperor Shenzong in the Northern Song dynasty (960–1127), the pagoda was relocated to the present site. The pagoda originally had seven storeys, but the top three storeys of the pagoda collapsed at the end of the 19th century whither only the lower four storeys remaining. In 1960, while the local government restored the pagoda, they founded a rectangular box underground. Over 700 Śarīras were preserved in the box, eleven of them are the Śarīra of Sakyamuni. It has been inscribed among the "Major National Historical and Cultural Sites in Jiangsu" by the State Council of China in 2013.

== See All ==
- Ganlu Temple
