= Kanroji =

Kanroji (甘露寺) may refer to:

- Kanroji Kiyoko (甘露寺 妍子) (1806–1861), concubine of Emperor Ninkō
- Mitsuri Kanroji (甘露寺 蜜璃), fictional character from the manga Demon Slayer: Kimetsu no Yaiba
- Nanami Kanroji (甘露寺 七海), fictional character from the visual novel School Days
- Yae Kanroji (甘露寺 八江), fictional character from the visual novel School Days

== See also ==
- Kanrojimae Station, railway station in the city of Kinokawa, Wakayama Prefecture, Japan
