= Kanrojimae Station =

Railway station in Kinokawa, Wakayama Prefecture, Japan

Kanrojimae Station 甘露寺前駅
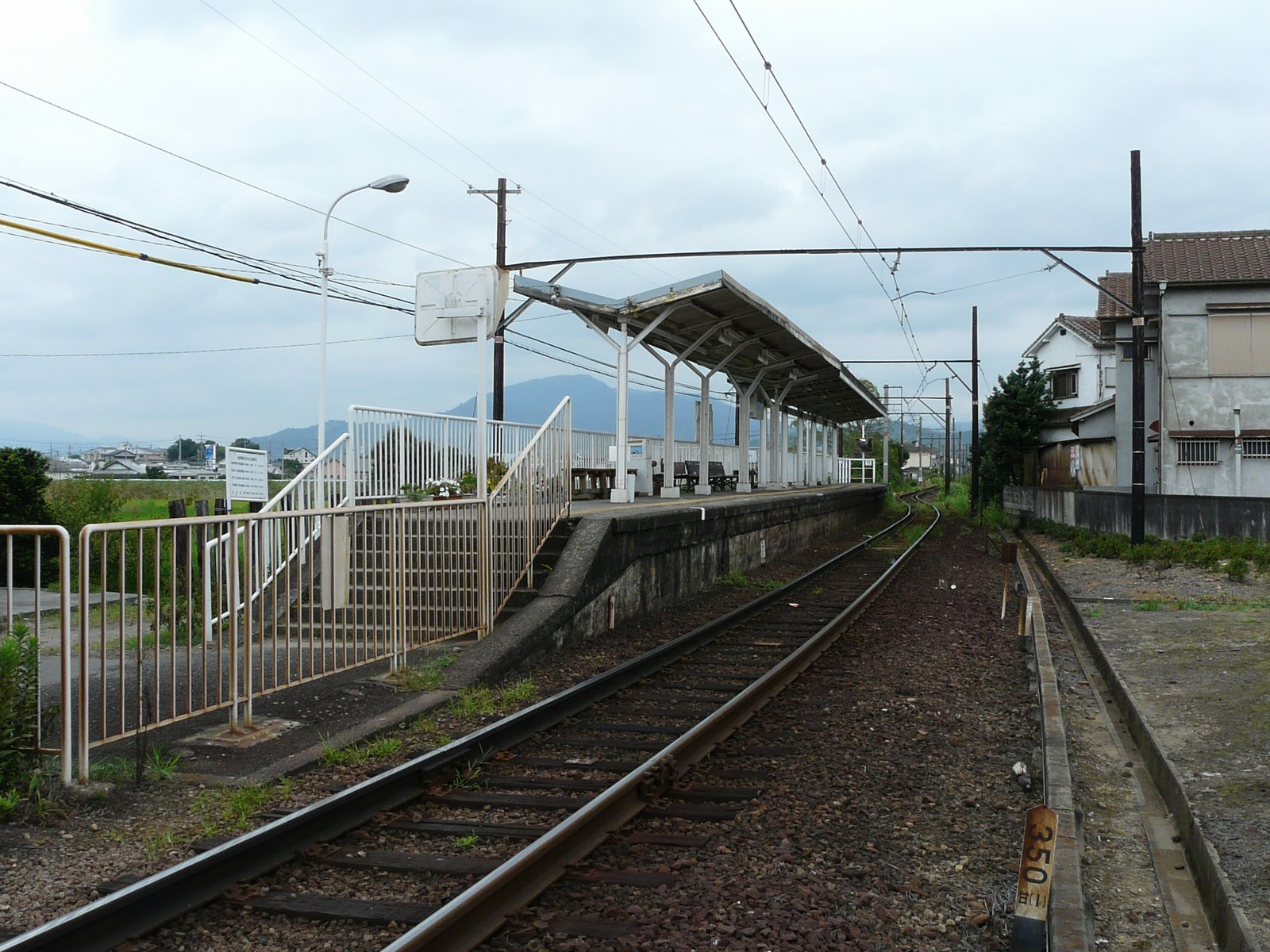
- Kanrojimae Station, July 2008

General information
- Location: Kishigawacho Nagayama, Kinokawa-shi, Wakayama-ken 640-0415; Japan
- Coordinates: 34.2133°N 135.3012°E
- Line: ■ Kishigawa Line
- Distance: 13.1 km from Wakayama
- Platforms: 1 side platform

Construction
- Structure type: At-grade

Other information
- Status: Unstaffed
- Station code: 13

History
- Opened: 18 August 1933

Passengers
- FY2017: 613 per day
Location
- Location within Wakayama Prefecture Location within Japan

Kanrojimae Station (甘露寺前駅, Kanrojimae-eki) is a passenger railway station in located in the city of Kinokawa, Wakayama Prefecture, Japan, operated by the private railway company Wakayama Electric Railway.

== Lines ==
Kanrojimae Station is served by the Kishigawa Line, and is located 13.1 kilometers from the terminus of the line at Wakayama Station.

== Station layout ==
The station consists of one side platform serving a single bi-directional track. The station is unattended.

== Adjacent stations ==
«	Service	»
Kishigawa Line
Nishiyamaguchi	Local	Kishi

== History ==
Kanrojimae Station opened on August 18, 1933.

== Passenger statistics ==
Ridership per day
Year	Ridership
2011	584
2012	575
2013	617
2014	608
2015	649
2016	619
2017	613

== Surrounding Area ==
- Kinokawa City Nishitakashi Elementary School
- Kinokawa City Takashigawa Junior High School
- Wakayama Prefectural Kishigawa High School

== See also ==
- List of railway stations in Japan
