= Ganlu Temple =

Ganlu Temple (Chinese: 甘露寺; pinyin: Gānlù Sì), may refer to:

- Ganlu Temple (Mount Jiuhua), on Mount Jiuhua, in Qingyang County, Anhui, China
- Ganlu Temple (Zhenjiang), in Zhenjiang, Jiangsu, China
- Ganlu Temple (Wuxi), in Wuxi, Jiangsu, China
