= Kanzaki Station =

Kanzaki Station may refer to either of the following railway stations in Japan:

- Kanzaki Station (Saga) (神埼駅)
- Kanzaki Station (Kagawa) (神前駅)
- Amagasaki Station (JR West), formerly (until 1948) called Kanzaki Station (神崎駅)
