= Kōzaki Station (Wakayama) =

Railway station in Wakayama, Wakayama Prefecture, Japan

Kōzaki Station 神前駅
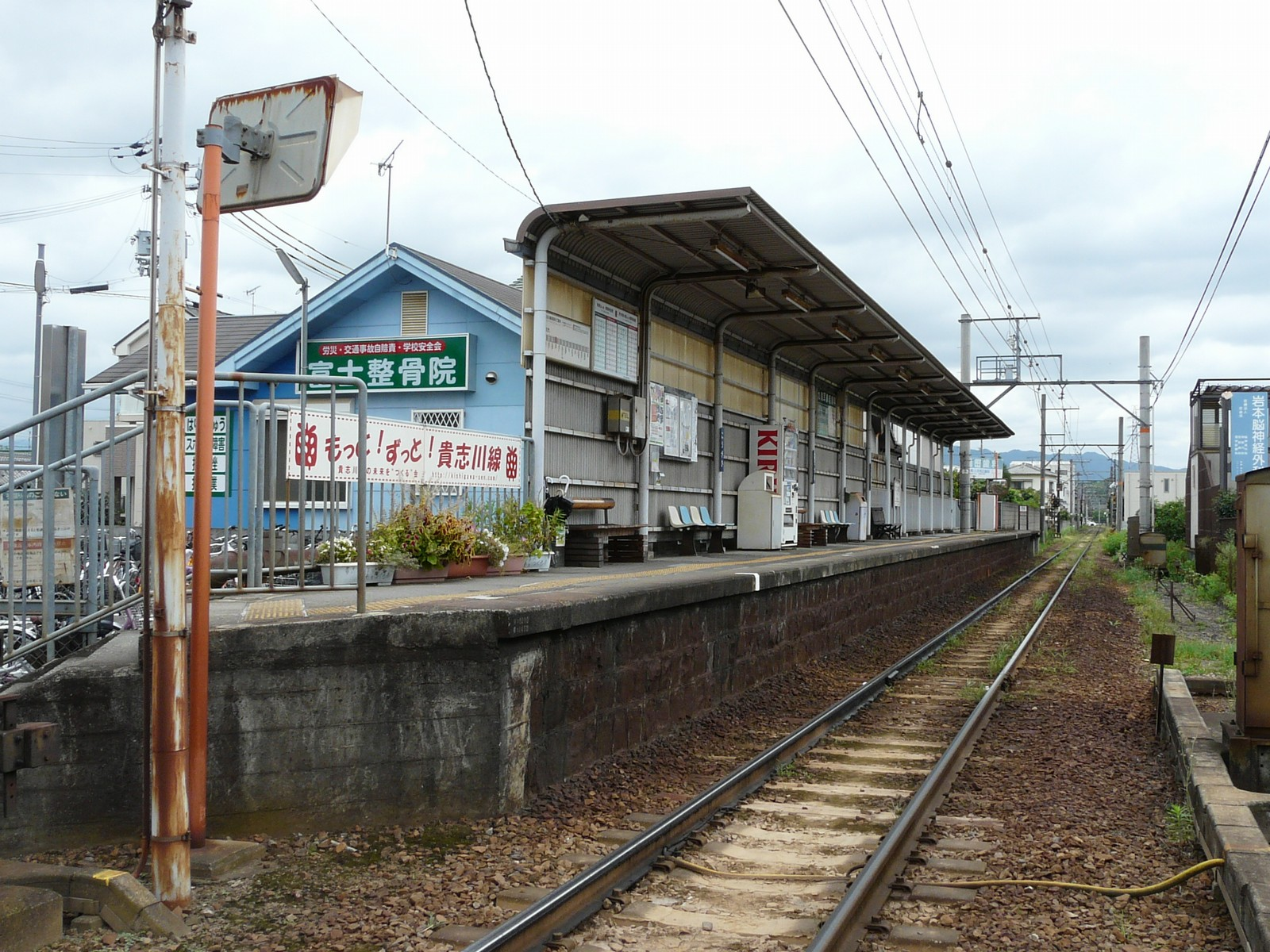
- Kōzaki Station, July 2008

General information
- Location: Kōzaki, Wakayama-shi, Wakayama-ken, 640-8314; Japan
- Coordinates: 34.2133°N 135.2051°E
- Operator: Wakayama Electric Railway
- Line: ■ Kishigawa Line
- Distance: 2.9 km from Wakayama
- Platforms: 1 side platform

Construction
- Structure type: At-grade

Other information
- Status: Unstaffed
- Station code: 04

History
- Opened: 15 February 1916

Passengers
- FY2017: 628 per day
Location
- Location within Wakayama Prefecture Location within Japan

Kōzaki Station (神前駅, Kōzaki eki) is a passenger railway station in located in the city of Wakayama, Wakayama Prefecture, Japan, operated by the private railway company Wakayama Electric Railway.

== Lines ==
Kōzaki Station is served by the Kishigawa Line, and is located 2.9 kilometers from the terminus of the line at Wakayama Station.

== Station layout ==
The station consists of one island platform with a level crossing. There is no station building and the station is unattended.

== Adjacent stations ==
«	Service	»
Kishigawa Line
Nichizengū	Local	Kamayama

== History ==
Kōzaki Station opened on February 15, 1916.

== Passenger statistics ==
Ridership per day
Year	Ridership
2011	721
2012	715
2013	756
2014	755
2015	672
2016	638
2017	628

== Surrounding Area ==
- Wakayama Municipal Okazaki housing complex.

== See also ==
- List of railway stations in Japan
