= Wakayama Shin-Ai Women's Junior College =

University in Wakayama, Japan

Coordinates: 34.1998°N 135.2309°E

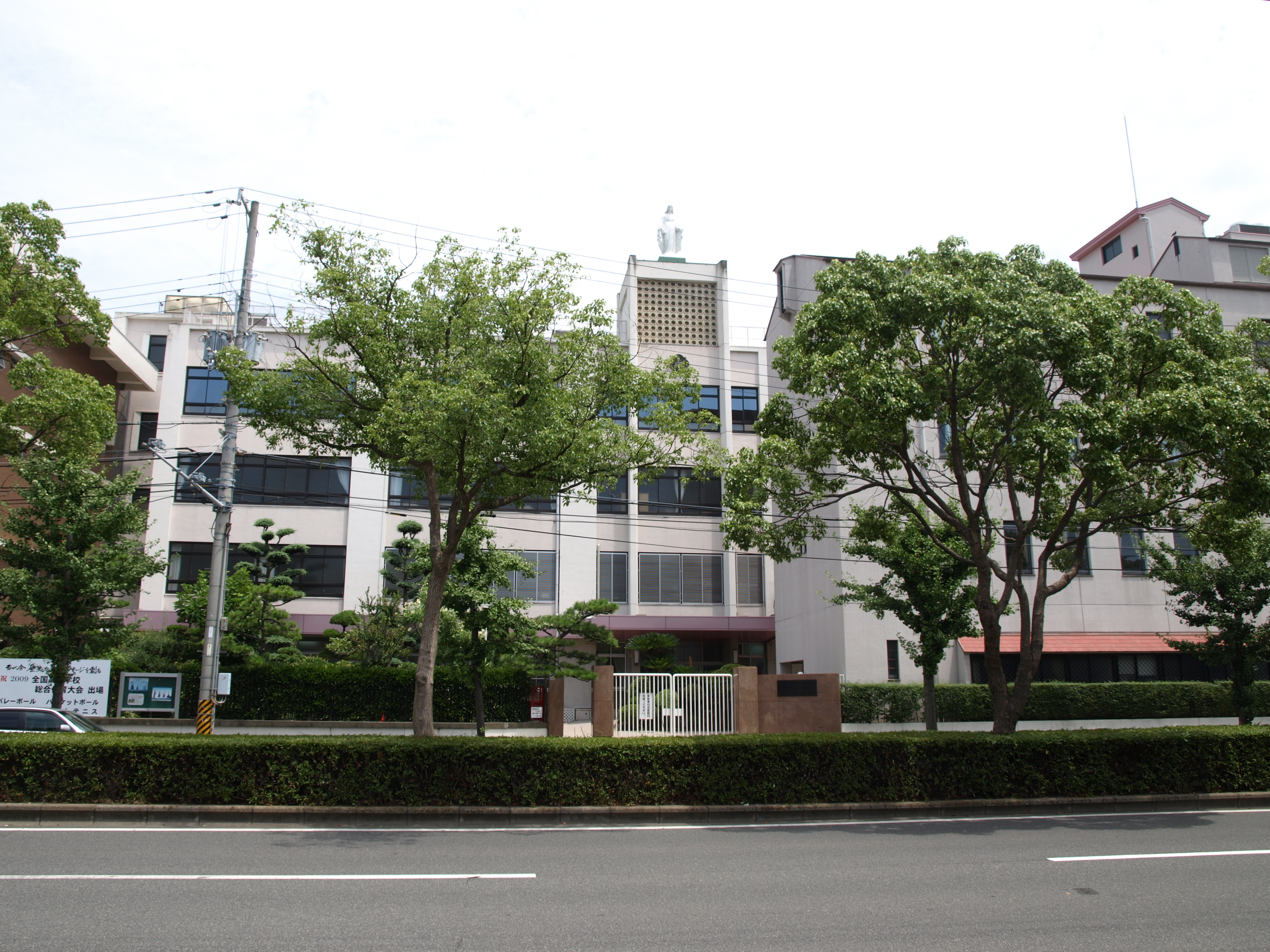

Wakayama Shin-Ai Women's Junior College (和歌山信愛女子短期大学, Wakayama shinai joshi tanki daigaku) is a private university in Wakayama, Wakayama, Japan. It was established in 1951.
