= Kishigawa Line =

Railway line in Wakayama prefecture, Japan

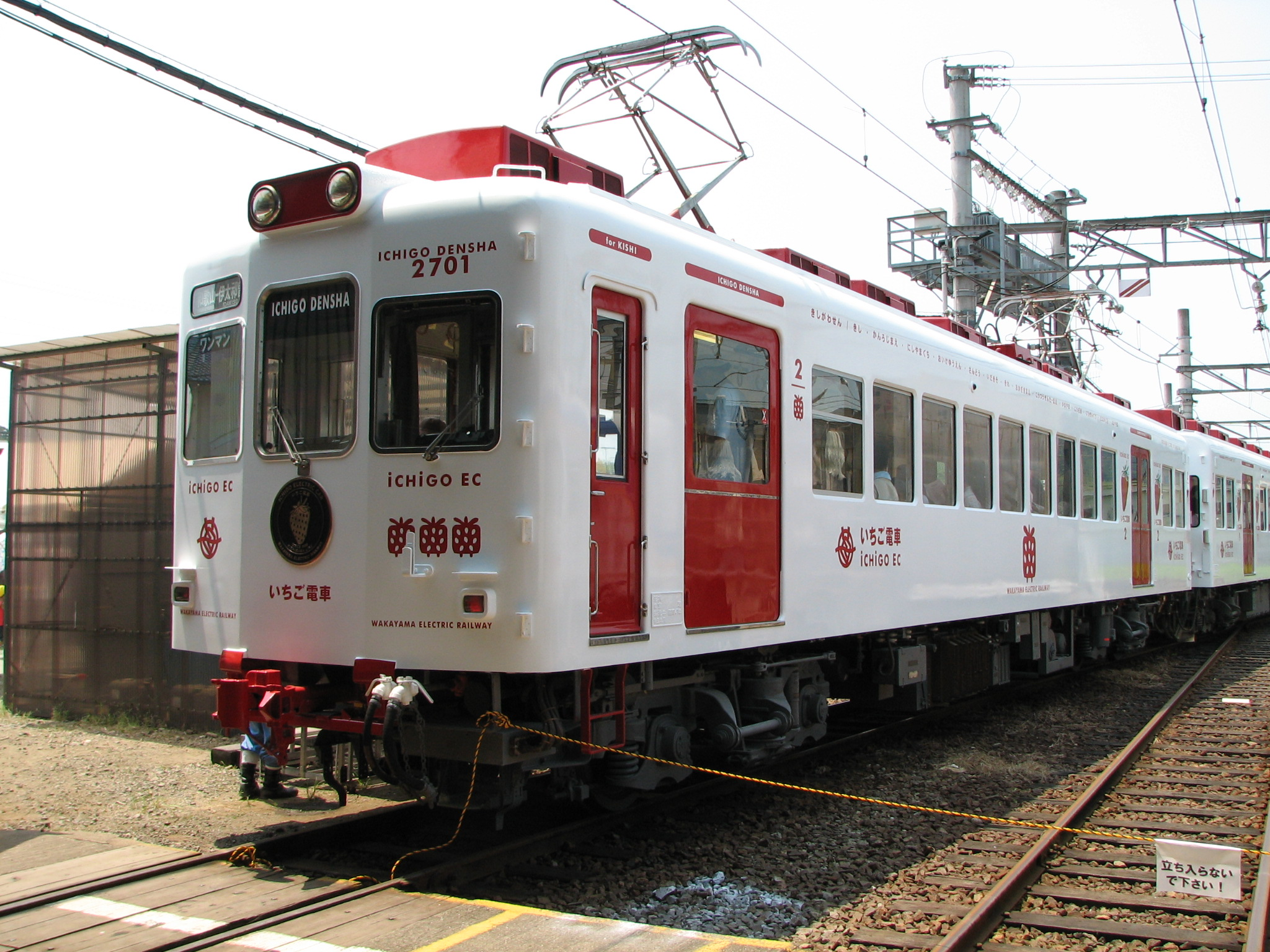
- "Ichigo EC" trainset designed by Eiji Mitooka

Overview
- Owner: Wakayama Electric Railway(It is a subsidiary of Okayama Electric Tramway, which belongings to Ryobi Holdings)
- Locale: Wakayama
- Stations: 14

Technical
- Line length: 14.3 km (8.9 mi)
- Track gauge: 1,067 mm (3 ft 6 in)
- Electrification: 1,500 V DC overhead catenary
- Operating speed: 60 km/h (37 mph)
Route map

The Kishigawa Line (貴志川線, Kishigawa-sen) is a railway line in Wakayama Prefecture, Japan. It is the sole line of the Wakayama Electric Railway Co., Ltd. The 14.3 km route extends from Wakayama Station in the city of Wakayama to Kishi Station in neighboring Kinokawa. Including the terminals, the Kishigawa Line has 14 stations. Its gauge is 1,067 mm (3 ft 6 in). The line is single-track and is electrified at 1,500 V DC. Prior to April 1, 2006, the line was part of the Nankai Electric Railway system. After that, this belonginged to Ryobi Holdings for business restructuring.

== History ==
The Sando Light Railway Co. opened the Wakayama – Sando section between 1916 and 1917, and extended the line to Kishi in 1933.

The line was electrified at 600 V DC between 1941 and 1943, and was acquired by the Nankai Electric Railway Co. in 1961.

CTC signalling was commissioned in 1993, and the Wakayama Electric Railway Co. acquired the line in 2006, increasing the line voltage to 1500 V DC in 2012.

== Rolling stock and service ==
The Kishigawa Line uses 6 sets (12 cars) of 2270 series electric multiple units (EMUs), originally built for Nankai and transferred to the new operator, together with the tracks and other assets of the Kishigawa Line.

Some of the cars have been repainted with the design by industrial designer Eiji Mitooka, who designed the type 9200 "MOMO" tram of Okayama Electric Tramway and various trains of JR Kyushu, including the 800 Series Shinkansen, while others are still in the Nankai livery.

In the mornings and evenings, the service operates three to four times each hour; at off-peak times, two per hour is the norm. The trains are driver-only operated, and do not have conductors.

== Stations ==
No.	Station	Japanese	Distance (km)	Distance between stations (km)	Transfers	Location
01	Wakayama	和歌山	0.0	-	T Wakayama Line; W Kisei Main Line; R Hanwa Line	Wakayama, Wakayama
02	Tanakaguchi	田中口	0.6	0.6		Wakayama, Wakayama
03	Nichizengū	日前宮	1.4	0.8		Wakayama, Wakayama
04	Kōzaki	神前	2.9	1.5		Wakayama, Wakayama
05	Kamayama	竈山	3.7	0.8		Wakayama, Wakayama
06	Kōtsū-Center-mae	交通センター前	4.8	1.1		Wakayama, Wakayama
07	Okazaki-mae	岡崎前	5.4	0.6		Wakayama, Wakayama
08	Kire	吉礼	6.4	1.0		Wakayama, Wakayama
09	Idakiso	伊太祈曽	8.0	1.6		Wakayama, Wakayama
10	Sandō	山東	9.1	1.1		Wakayama, Wakayama
11	Oikeyūen	大池遊園	11.3	2.2		Kinokawa, Wakayama
12	Nishiyamaguchi	西山口	12.1	0.8		Kinokawa, Wakayama
13	Kanroji-mae	甘露寺前	13.1	1.0		Kinokawa, Wakayama
14	Kishi	貴志	14.3	1.2		Kinokawa, Wakayama

== Features ==
In addition to the new design of the rolling stock, the operator is eager to attract passengers through unique measures such as the following:

- Before trains arrive at Kishi Station or after trains leave there, The Beatles song "Strawberry Fields Forever" is played.
- Kishi Station appoints a cat named Tama as its stationmaster, complete with miniature stationmaster hat. Japan was in mourning after Wakayama Railway announced that Nitama (Tama II), the stationmaster cat, died on November 20, 2025. She was 15 years old. Nitama was rescued when she was two months old after nearly getting run over by traffic. She was taken in by employees at Wakayama Railway and lived there along with Tama, the original stationmaster cat. When Tama I died in 2015, Nitama was the natural successor and continued Tama’s legacy. Together, they helped rescue the rural train line, which had been experiencing declines in ridership before the feline stationmasters were hired. Nitama was promoted to Ultra Stationmaster in 2021 and was given responsibility for all 14 stations. Following Nitama's death in November 2025, a memorial service was held at Kishi Station on December 13, 2025. The railway company continues the tradition, with other cats (all named Tama) acting as stationmasters at other stations along the line. At Kishi Station, Yontama (Tama IV) promoted to Stationmaster in January 2026.

== See also ==
- List of railway lines in Japan
