= Cat Island =

Cat Island may refer to:

== Places ==
=== Japan ===
Some islands of Japan are called Cat Island (猫島) due to a high population of cats.

- Cat islands in Japan

- Aoshima, Ehime
- Fukashima (深島), an island of Saiki, Ōita
- Manabeshima, Okayama
- Tashirojima, Miyagi

=== United States ===
- Cat Island (Louisiana)
- Cat Island (Massachusetts), United States
- Cat Island (Mississippi), United States
- Cat Island (South Carolina), one of the Sea Islands in Beaufort County, South Carolina, United States
- Cat Island (Wisconsin), United States
- Cat Island National Wildlife Refuge, Louisiana, United States

=== Elsewhere ===
- Cat Island (Antarctica)
- Cat Island (Tasmania), Australia
- Cat Island, Bahamas
- Cat Island (Rodrigues), Mauritius

== Other ==
- Cat Island, Rum Cay & San Salvador, a parliamentary constituency represented in the House of Assembly of the Bahamas
- Cat Island, a 1981 science fiction novel by Walter Jon Williams

== See also ==
- Cát Bà Island, Vietnam
- Wild Cat Island
