= Cat islands in Japan =

Islands known for their feral cat populations

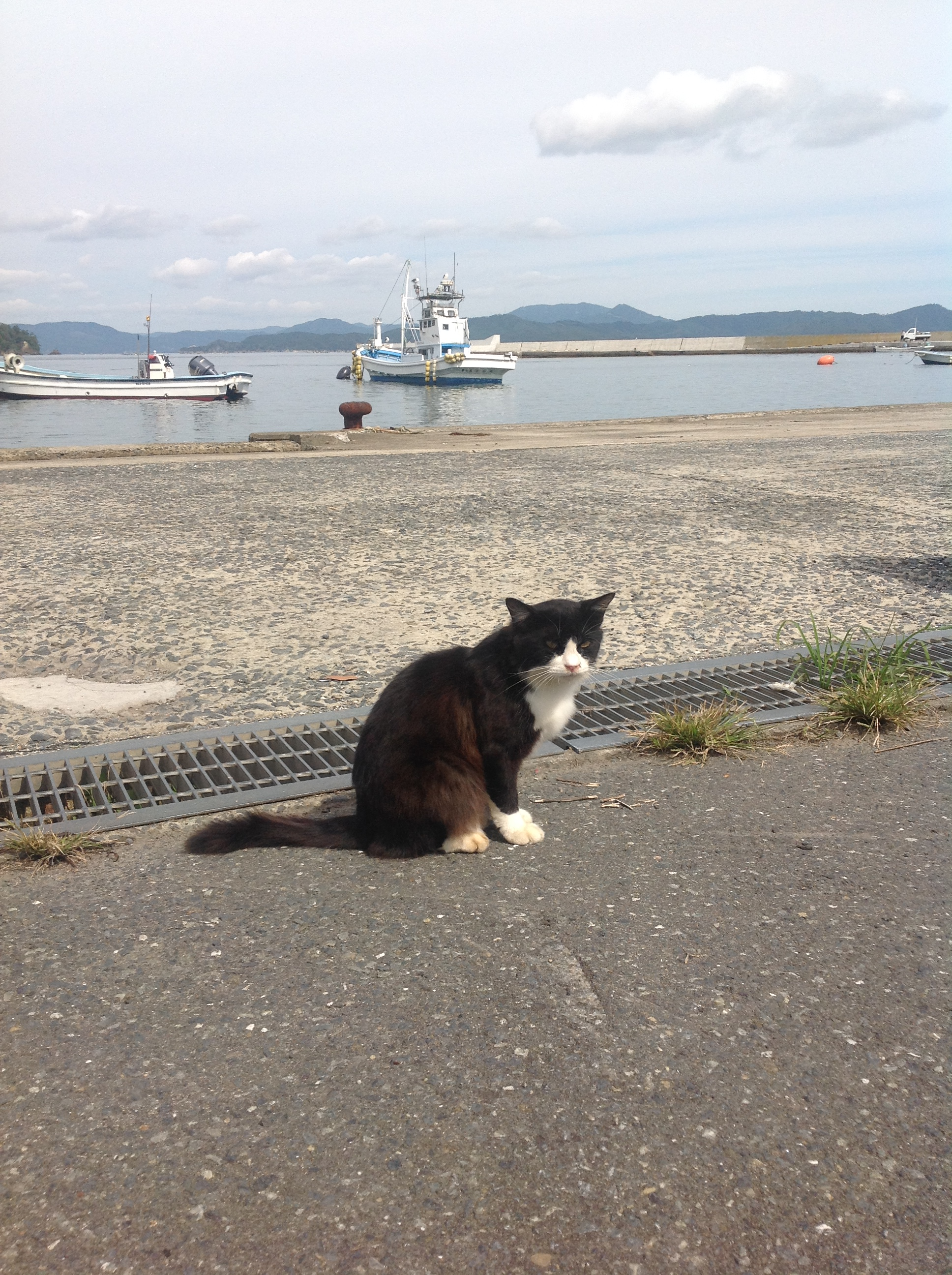
A cat by the port of Tashirojima

A number of islands in Japan have become known for their large feral cat populations. These cat islands (猫の島, neko no shima) tend to be the result of the introduction of cats for pest control. On islands with an appropriate climate, the lack of predators such as dogs, and sometimes a lack of cars, mean these introductions led to large cat populations that faced few threats. Today, the presence of these cats has turned some of these islands into tourist attractions.

In many of these islands, the cat populations are larger than the human populations. The presence of cats has sometimes influenced local folklore: there is supposedly a taboo on Kakarajima against keeping dogs, and a shrine to a cat deity exists on Tashirojima. Stray cats on these islands are often fed by locals and tourists. However, as they are wild, it is rare that they receive further care or veterinary attention. The use of trap–neuter–return to control cat populations has been used on some occasions. On Aoshima, one of the most famous cat islands, the human population has decreased to just four people. All of its cats have been neutered, and it is expected that Aoshima will soon no longer host humans or cats.

== Origins ==
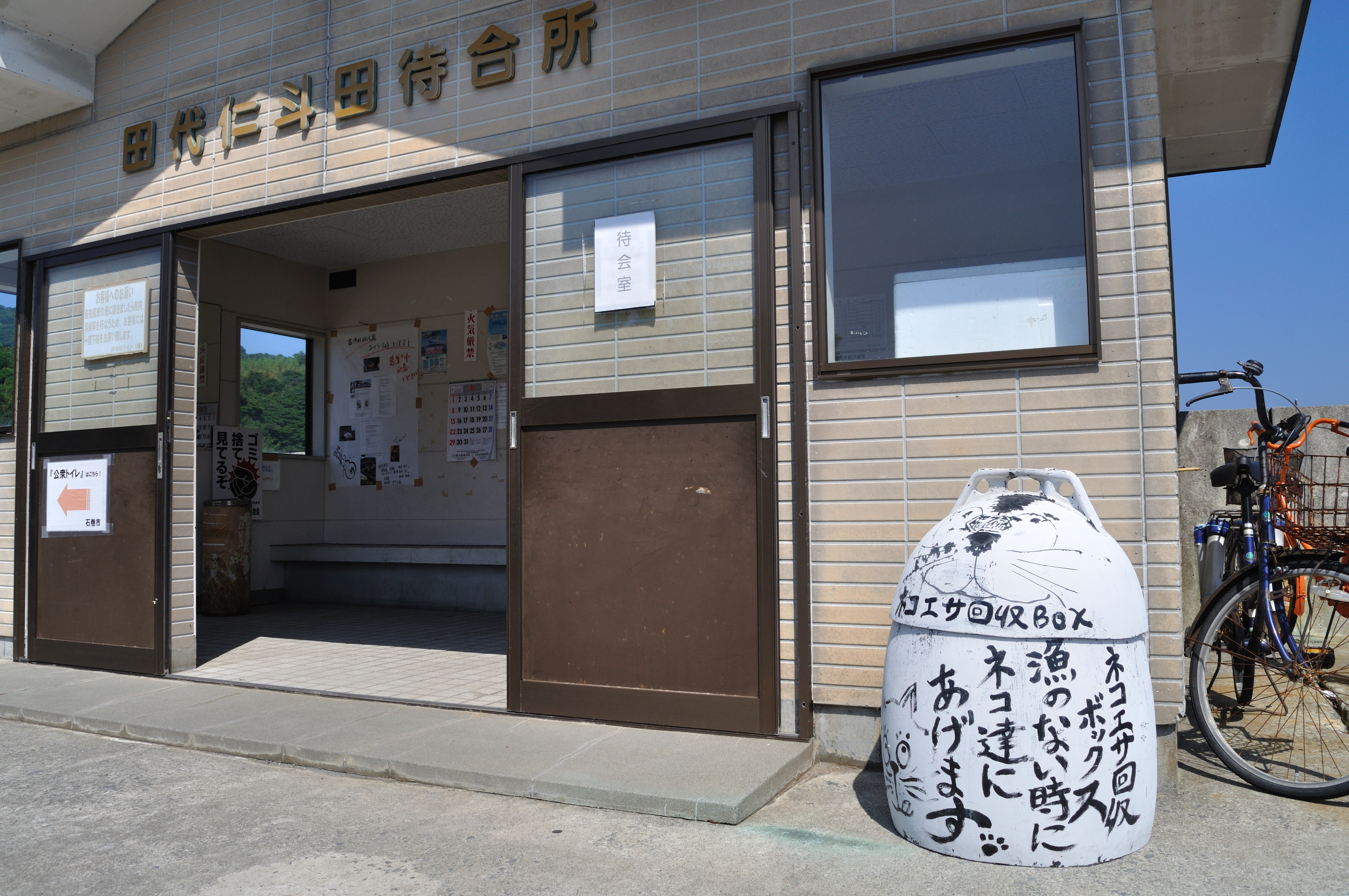
A fishing bait container on Tashirojima

Cat islands tend to be the result of the introduction of cats for pest control. Cats were particularly important for the control of mice, as mice caused problems such as chewing on fishing nets, eating grain supplies, or eating silkworms. These led to the development of large stray cat populations resident to the islands, as the cats established breeding populations. Cats may also be present due to associations with good fortune. The presence of cats on Kakarajima is said to be due to a local taboo against keeping dogs.

The survival of cats on these islands may have been facilitated by a lack of cars and dogs. In some islands, cat populations outnumber human ones. This is most extreme in Aoshima, where the number of people living on the island has decreased from around 900 in the 1940s to a small and decreasing number of elderly people in the 2020s. Most cat islands are surrounded by the ocean; Okishima is an inland cat island, located within Lake Biwa.

== Impact ==
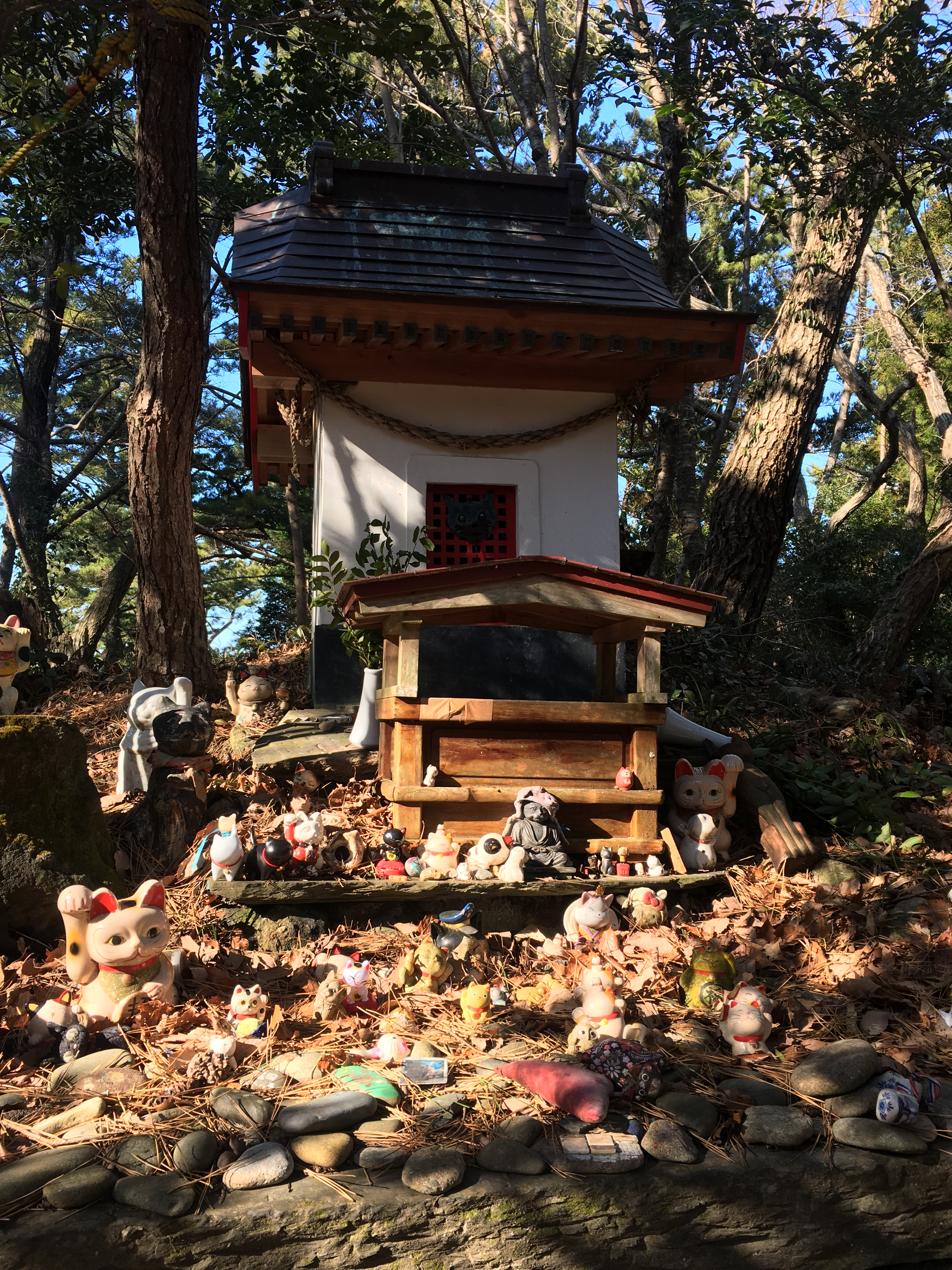
The cat shrine at Tashirojima

Cat islands have become a well-known phenomenon in Japan, and these islands have become popular tourist attractions. Some are so associated with the cats that they are sometimes simply called "Cat Island". Sometimes referred to as "cat heavens", these islands have sought to take advantage of this tourism potential to different extents. In this respect, cat islands are similar to other areas of Japan that have started to use "nekonomics" (cat economics) to attract tourists.

Tashirojima sees 40,000 tourists a year, while having only 60 human residents. Structures built for tourists often use cat motifs. Sanagishima is known for photos of cats jumping across a gap in a wall at a port. Residents of Yushima have set up information signs to guide tourists to common cat locations. Aoshima, on the other hand, has not developed facilities and restricts visitors to particular areas. Cat feeding is only permitted in designated spots. Many cat islands have small human populations. The smallest is Aoshima, where the human population has dwindled to a handful.

In some islands, cats have become part of local folklore. Tashirojima has a cat shrine at a location where a cat that was accidentally killed by a fisherman is buried. This cat spirit is now viewed as the guardian deity for large catches.

As these cat populations are feral, they have higher rates of disease than are normally found in pet cats. While adult cats are well fed, including by tourists, infant mortality from disease is relatively high. Tomcats often fight over the small territory available. Studies on Ainoshima found that the populations divided into groups dominated by large males, although these males often bred with females from other groups. Some people have abandoned cats on Enoshima, the cat island closest to Tokyo.

== Management ==
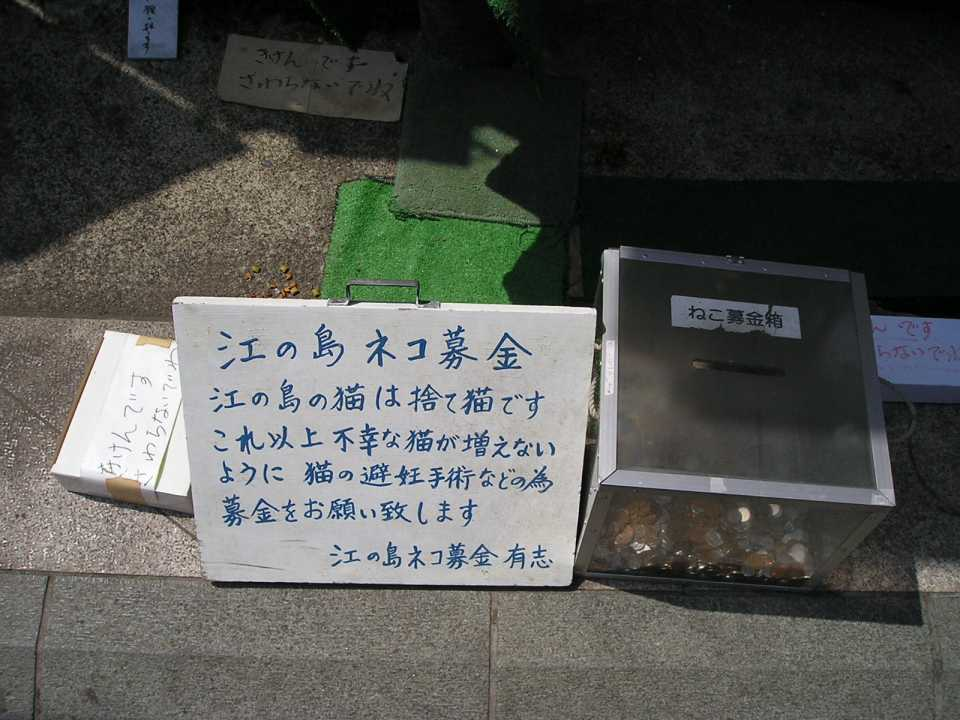
A donation box for cat care at Enoshima

Culturally, stray animals are often regarded with different ethical considerations to indoor pets. While stray cats are often fed, locals often consider the populations wild, and they generally do not receive veterinary care. Life spans for adults tend to be around three to five years.

In some cases there has been local government intervention on cat islands. Exterminating cats used to be more common in Japan, but as cats have grown in popularity non-lethal management has gained popularity. A trap–neuter–return effort began on Tokunoshima in November 2014, as the growing cat population has severely endangered the local Amami rabbit population.

Cats on Aoshima are mostly taken care of by a group called the Aoshima Cat Protection Society. As the population of the island has decreased, caring for the cats has become more difficult. In July 2017, a trap–neuter–return project was proposed, which the Ōzu city government funded in 2018. At this time, the island had 13 human residents to around 130 cats. While at least one resident opposed the initiative, no kittens were recorded after the mass neutering. By 2024, there were only four human residents. That year, it was announced that the island was expected to soon cease to be home to both cats and humans, possibly within two years.

== List ==
Cat islands occur in many areas of Japan, although they tend to be in the south, where the weather is warmer. Two of the most well-known are Aoshima and Tashirojima. Tashirojima is a more northern island, but as it is surrounded by the Kuroshio Current it is warmer than the nearby mainland and does not receive snow. Cats are common on many inhabited islands, so the following list is not exhaustive.

Name	Prefecture	Location	Cat
Ainoshima (Kitakyushu)	Fukuoka	North of Kyushu	
Ainoshima (Shingū)	Fukuoka	North of Kyushu	
Aoshima	Ehime	In the Seto Inland Sea	
Enoshima	Kanagawa	In a bay in southern Honshu	
Kakarajima	Saga	Northwest of Kyushu	
Fukashima	Ōita	East of Kyushu	
Genkai Island	Fukuoka	Northwest of Kyushu	
Iwai Island	Yamaguchi	In the Seto Inland Sea	
Manabeshima	Okayama	In the Seto Inland Sea	
Muzukijima	Ehime	In the Seto Inland Sea	
Ogijima	Kagawa	In the Seto Inland Sea	
Okishima	Shiga	In the freshwater Lake Biwa	
Sanagishima	Kagawa	In the Seto Inland Sea	
Taketomi Island	Okinawa	In the southern Ryukyu Islands	
Tashirojima	Miyagi	In a bay off eastern Honshu	
Tokunoshima	Kagoshima	In the northern Ryukyu Islands	
Yushima	Kumamoto	In a bay off western Kyushu	

== See also ==
- Community cat
- Forbidden City cats
- Hermitage cats
- Parliament Hill cat colony
