= Aji =

Aji or AJI may refer to:

== Location ==
- Aji (town), Tieling County, Liaoning, China
- Aji Island, Miyagi Prefecture, Japan
- Aji, Kagawa, Kagawa Prefecture, Japan
- Aji River (disambiguation), rivers with the same name

== Other ==
- Aji (Go), a latent troublesome weakness or other possibility in a position in the game of Go
- Aji (Ryūkyū), a historical title and rank in the Ryukyu Islands
- Ají (sauce) a condiment made with cilantro, green onions, and garlic
- Aji Assamese Daily, a newspaper in Assam, India
- Ají pepper (Capsicum baccatum), a pepper that originated in ancient Peru
- Ağrı Airport (IATA code AJI), near the city of Ağrı, Ağrı Province, Turkey
- Al Jazeera English, an Arab television channel formerly called "Al-Jazeera International"
- Alliance of Independent Journalists, an Indonesian journalists organization
- American Jujitsu Institute, an American jujitsu organization founded by Henry Okazaki in 1939
- Seno Aji, an Indonesian politician and Deputy Governor of East Kalimanatan
- Kunto Aji, an Indonesian singer
- A female Hajji in Wolof, variation: Ajaratou
- Japanese horse mackerel, found around the coast of Japan
- "Aaji", a short story by Indian writer Narayan Dharap, adapted into the 2018 horror film Tumbbad
