= Okinoshima =

Okinoshima may refer to:

- Oki Islands, a group of Japanese islands historically called Okinoshima
- Okinoshima, Shimane, a town on Dōgo Island, Japan
- Okinoshima (Fukuoka), an island part of the Munakata city
- Okinoshima (Kōchi), an island located southwest of the present-day Kōchi Prefecture
- Okinoshima (Shiga), an island in Shiga Prefecture
- Okinoshima (Kagoshima), an island part of Ichikikushikino city
- Okinoshima, a subsequent name of the General Admiral Graf Apraksin surrendered to Imperial Japanese Navy after the Battle of Tsushima in 1905
- Japanese minelayer Okinoshima, an Imperial Japanese Navy minelayer commissioned in 1936 and sunk in 1942
