= Kakara =

Kakara may refer to:

- Kakara, Indonesia, an island in Indonesia
- Kakara pitha, a cake associated with Odisha, India
- Kakarajima, an island in Japan
- Kokora, a village in Estonia
