= Ainoshima (Shingū) =

Island off the coast of Fukuoka, Japan

Ainoshima (Aino-Island)
Native name: 相島 (Ainoshima)
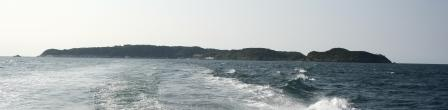
- Ainoshima

- Location within Japan Location within Fukuoka Prefecture

Geography
- Location: Genkai Sea
- Coordinates: 33°45′44.5″N 130°21′54.5″E
- Area: 1.25 km^{2} (0.48 sq mi)
- Coastline: 8 km (5 mi)

Administration
- Japan
- Prefecture: Fukuoka Prefecture
- District: Kasuya District
- Town: Shingū

Additional information
- Official website: Shingū Town Official Website (in Japanese)

Ainoshima (Japanese: 相島) (Aino-Island) is an island in Shingū, Fukuoka, Japan. Many feral cats and strays live on this island. Hence, it is known as "Cat Heaven Island".

== Sightseeing spots ==
Ainoshima has some historic sites.

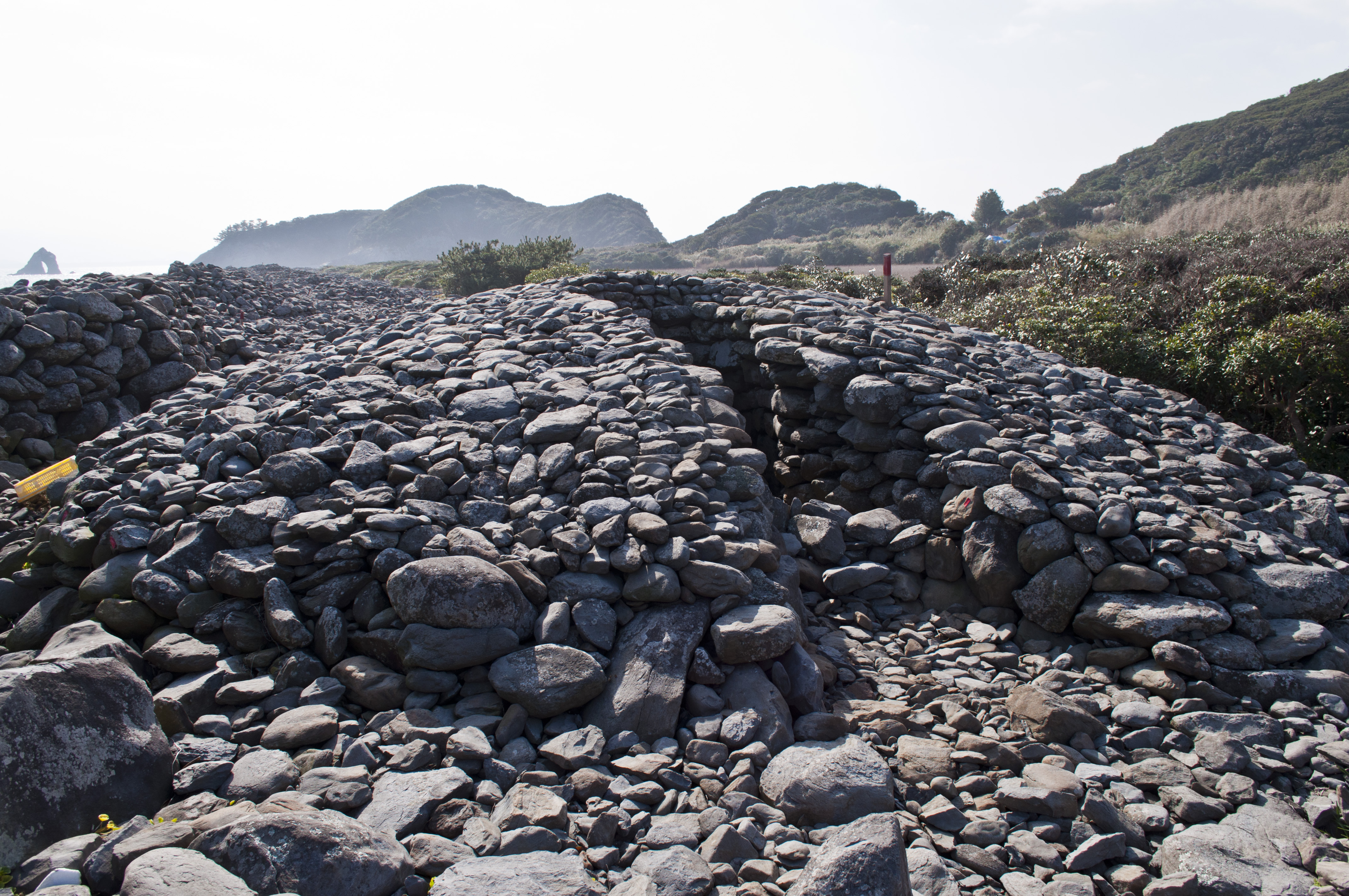
Ainoshima Stone Tumuli (相島積石塚群, Ainoshima tsumiishitsuka-gun)

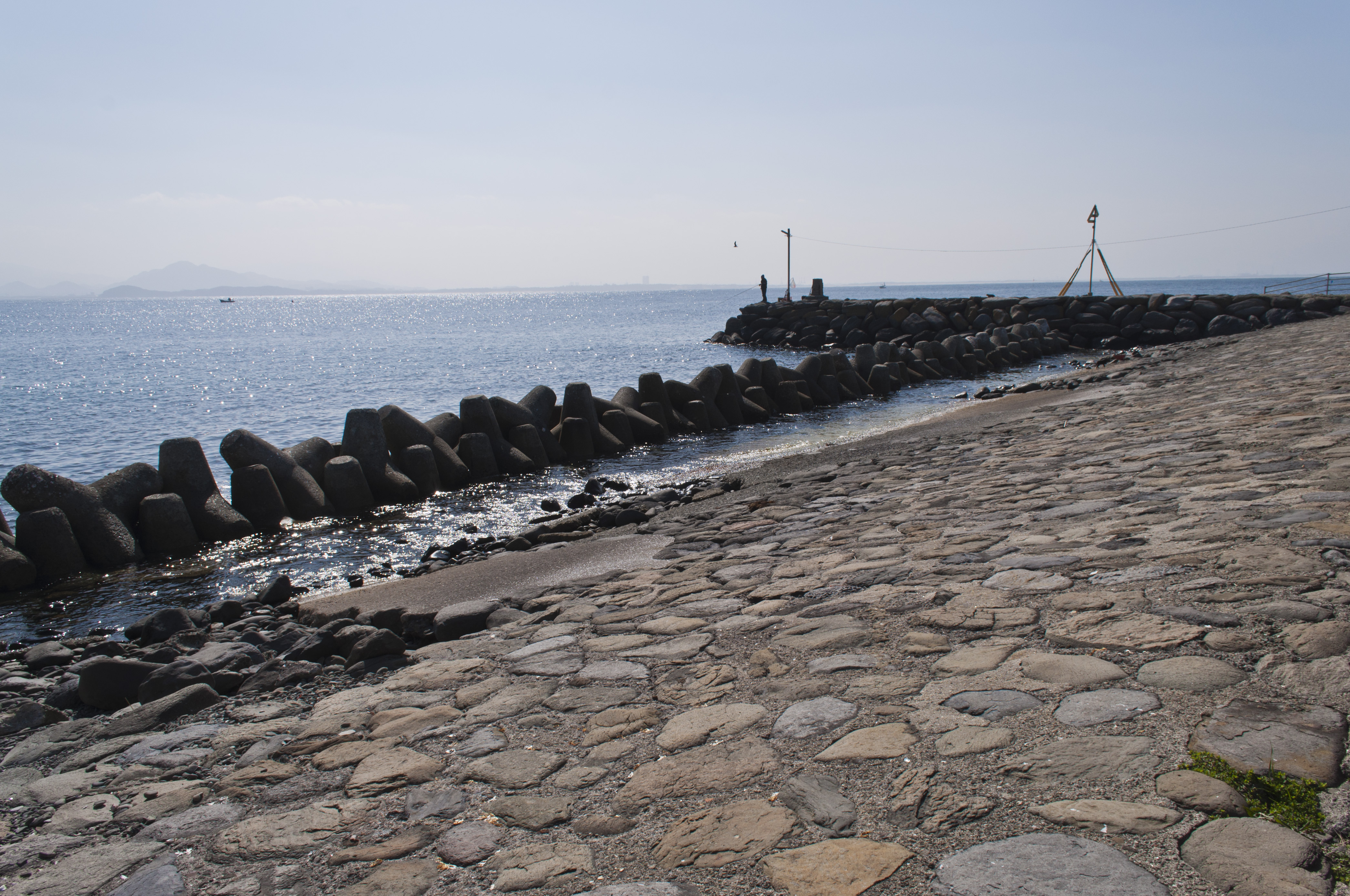
The old wharf for Joseon missions to Japan

=== Tumuli ===
These piles of stone from the 5th century are located on the eastern side of the island. They are speculated to mark ancient graves.

== Transportation ==
- Shingū Municipal Ferry Service (新宮町営渡船, Shingū Chō-ei Tosen)
- Shingū Port (Shingū Fishing Port) – Ainoshima Port : Required time and fare: approx. 17 minutes, 480 JPY
- Shingū Port is a twenty-minute walk from Nishitetsu Shingū Station.
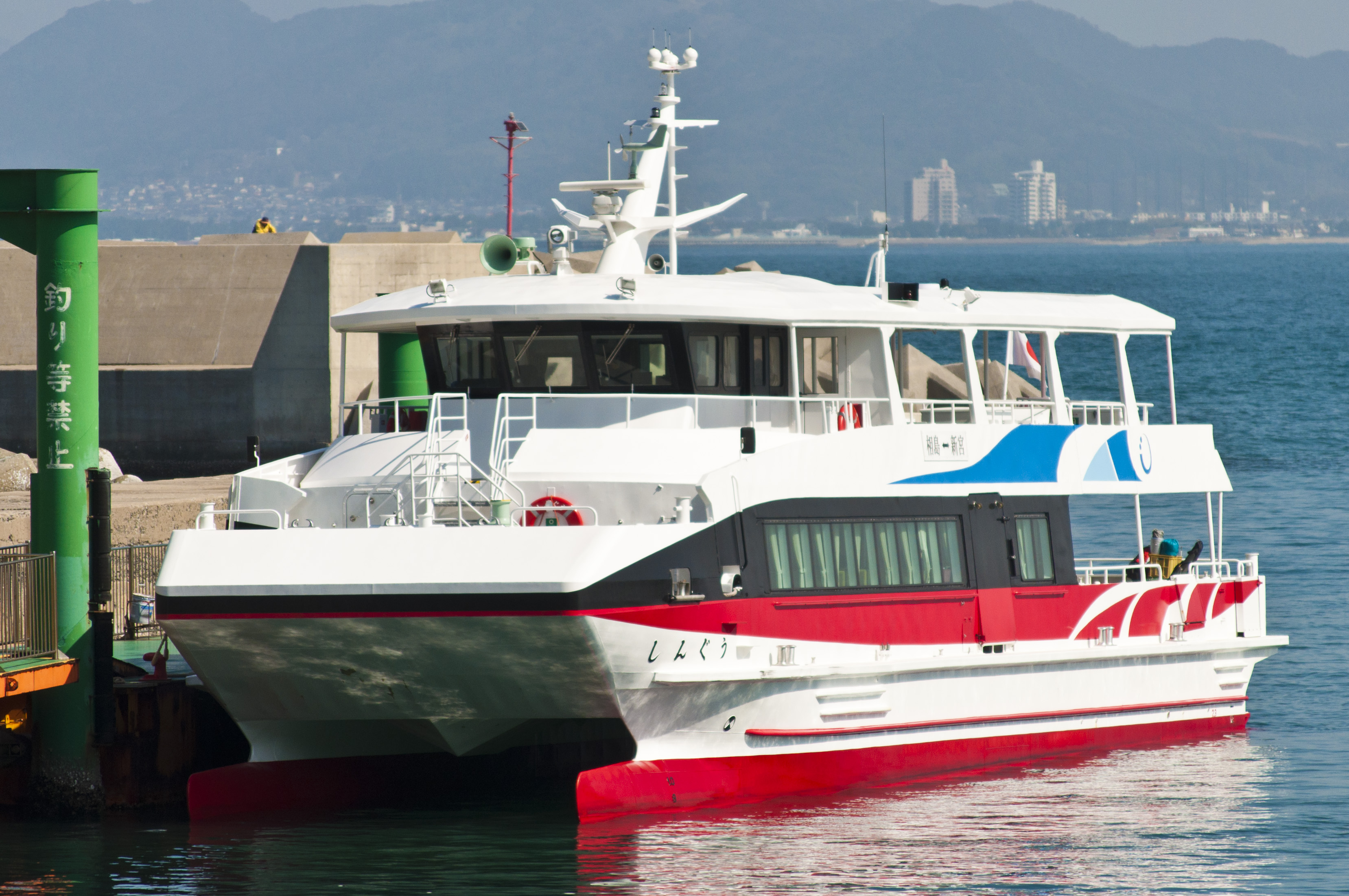
Ferry "Shingū" (しんぐう)

== See also ==
- Aoshima, Ehime, another Japanese "Cat Island"
- Tashirojima, another Japanese "Cat Island"
- Ōkunoshima, known as Usagi-jima ("Rabbit Island") for its feral rabbit population
