= List of Heavenly Delusion chapters =

Written and illustrated by Masakazu Ishiguro, Heavenly Delusion started in Kodansha's seinen manga magazine Monthly Afternoon on January 25, 2018. Kodansha has collected its chapters into individual tankōbon volumes. The first volume was released on July 23, 2018; a promotional video, directed by Tasuku Watanabe, for the first volume was released on the same date. As of October 22, 2026, 14 volumes have been released.

The story is divided in two storylines with one involving the characters Maru and Kiruko as they travel across a post-apocalyptic world, while another story focuses on a group of children who live in a school. In the outside world, 15 years have passed since an unprecedented disaster completely destroyed modern civilization. A group of children live in a facility isolated from the outside world. One day, one of them, a girl named Tokio, receives a message that says "Do you want to go outside of the outside?" Mimihime, another girl who lives in the same facility, has a prediction and tells the upset Tokio that two people will come from the outside to save her, one of whom has the same face as her, while the director of the school tells her that the outside world is Hell. Meanwhile, a boy named Maru, who looks just like Tokio, is traveling through this devastated Japan with a girl named Kiruko, in search of Heaven.

In North America, the series is licensed in English by Denpa. The first volume was released on December 31, 2019.

== Volumes ==
| No. | Original release date | Original ISBN | English release date | English ISBN |
|---|---|---|---|---|
| 1 | July 23, 2018 | 978-4-06-511976-1 | December 31, 2019 | 978-1-63442-940-5 |
1. "Tokio" (トキオ); 2. "Maru" (マル); 3. "Kiruko" (キルコ); 4. "'Hiruko' 1" ("ヒルコ" ①); 5. "'Hiruko' 2" ("ヒルコ" ②); 6. "Taka" (タカ); 7. "Tomato Heaven" (トマト天国, Tomato Tengoku)
In a school, several young students are being observed by their teachers. One student, Tokio, is attracted to the artist Kona and keeps several drawings he makes which are found unreal by another one. The story then moves to young boy similar to Tokio named Maru who is travelling alongside his bodyguard Kiruko to find a place known as Heaven to inject a similar person with a drug. During their journey, they are allowed to rest into a woman's house. However, in the night they are attacked by monster labeled as Hiruko who kills the woman. Maru manages to kill the Hiruko with a supernatural ability he possesses. The duo continue their journey to Heaven until they are welcome by a family of farmers from the Kusanabe Plantation. As they rest, Maru tells Kiruko he likes her but the latter claims she is actually a man with a female body.
| 2 | March 22, 2019 | 978-4-06-514744-3 | September 26, 2021 | 978-1-63442-944-3 |
8. "Kiriko Takehaya" (竹早桐子, Takehaya Kiriko); 9. "Haruki Takehaya" (竹早春希, Takehaya Haruki); 10. "Kuku 1" (クク①); 11. "Kuku 2" (クク ②); 12. "Mina" (ミーナ); 13. "Tarao 1" (タラオ①)
Kiriko Takehaya was a famous racer who lived with her brother, the rebellious Haruki, and a group of orphans assisted by Robin Inazaki. During the attack of a Hiruko, Haruki suffered severe wounds, losing all his limbs. His brain was then transplanted into Kiriko's body. Now known as Kiruko, she started searching for her missing friends. After telling Maru this, the duo finds themselves attacked by a fish-like Hiruko. With Kiruko out of firepower, she and Maru are chased by the monster until it is altered by the marijuana hidden inside, leaving Maru to perform the finishing move on the creature. Meanwhile at the school, Tokio sees a group of faceless babies. Shortly after that, a fellow student named Tarao suffers a disease and tries to kiss Tokio. After leaving the ship, Maru and Kiruko continue their journey on foot where the former gets into a fight with delinquents.
| 3 | October 23, 2019 | 978-4-06-517266-7 | April 6, 2022 | 978-1-63442-962-7 |
14. "Tarao 2" (タラオ②); 15. "Tarao 3" (タラオ③); 16. "100% Safe Water" (100%安全水, Hyaku Pāsento Anzen Sui); 17. "Totori" (トトリ); 18. "The Immortal Order 1" (不滅教団①, Fumetsu Kyōdan 1); 19. "The Immortal Order 2" (不滅教団②, Fumetsu Kyōdan 2)
Fearing another fight, Kiruko hides Maru in a room while she sells items she has found. Meanwhile, Tarao passes away due to his terminal disease much to the shock of the students with Kona remembering another late student, Asura. As they comfort each other, Kona and Tokio start a relationship. Back during their search for Heaven, Maru and Kiruko hunt a Hiruko only to be shocked by the fact it is a wild bear. Nevertheless, they kill it through teamwork. As they rest in an inn, the young owner named Totori tries to seduce Maru who instead discovers she has the heart of a Hiruko. The next day, Maru and Kiruko leave the city and meet a man who wants to hire him to take to the Immortal Order which is doing experiments with human lives to create immortal creatures. Though the man gives up, the duo decides to investigate it to search for Kiruko's doctor, Sawatari. They meet the Liviuman who oppose the Order's methods and accept the job of investigating. As they enter the building, two are approached by small Hirukos.
| 4 | May 22, 2020 | 978-4-06-519470-6 | October 19, 2022 | 978-1-63442-923-8 |
20. "The Immortal Order 3" (不滅教団③, Fumetsu Kyōdan 3); 21. "The Immortal Order 4" (不滅教団④, Fumetsu Kyōdan 4); 22. "The Immortal Order 5" (不滅教団⑤, Fumetsu Kyōdan 5); 23. "Asura" (アスラ); 24. "A-mk3"; 25. "The Wall Town 1" (壁の町①, Kabe no Machi 1)
Kiruko is trapped in a hallucination by the enemies until Maru wakes her up with a kiss and eliminates all the creatures. They are then met by a man wearing an eye patch who says he is Dr. Usami and he asks for their help. One of the human experiments wishes for a mercy kill by eliminating the Hiruko inside her body that has left her alive. Maru agrees but is shocked when Usami kills himself afterwards. Before leaving, Kiruko learns that Robin is still alive and she goes on a search to find him. Meanwhile in Heaven, Tokio fears something bad is going to happen to her body while Kona remembers Asura's suicide. The adults develop a gun identical to Kiruko's as she and Maru meet a man named Juichi. He gives them multiple theories to what caused the tragedy in the world and that there was a sect that advocated female supremacy, which they believe is Takahara Academy due to it having the same logo seen on Kiruko's gun. The Heaven leaders are in a commotion when learning Tokio is pregnant and wish to know the father's identity.
| 5 | December 23, 2020 | 978-4-06-521725-2 | May 2, 2023 | 978-1-63442-817-0 |
26. "The Wall Town 2" (壁の町②, Kabe no Machi 2); 27. "The Wall Town 3" (壁の町③, Kabe no Machi 3); 28. "The Wall Town 4" (壁の町④, Kabe no Machi 4); 29. "The Wall Town 5" (壁の町⑤, Kabe no Machi 5); 30. "Director" (園長, Enchō); 31. "Ohma" (オーマ, Ōma)
Kiruko and Maru investigate one empty Takahara Academy facility as they believe it is connected to Heaven. The two are interrupted by Juichi who is investigating it too to find a child in the facility. However, they reach another empty building where they attacked by a Hiruko able to freeze the area. After Kiruko takes it down, one of Juichi's allies reveal they found the missing child, his son. Kiruko and Maru are later attacked by the Hiruko again, whom they realize is actually Juichi's son and manage to calm him down. The next day, Kiruko and Maru are offered a vehicle by Juichi and continue their journey, though the man kills one of his allies. Meanwhile in Heaven, after Tokio gives birth to a child, the Director aims to transplant her brain in order to increase her lifespan. Mimihime interacts with the new students but one of them gives her hallucinations. Kiruko and Maru find information of Robin in another city and split up so that the former can talk with her old friend.
| 6 | July 21, 2021 | 978-4-06-524049-6 | September 26, 2023 | 978-1-63442-848-4 |
32. "Robin Inazaki 1" (稲崎露敏①, Inazaki Robin 1); 33. "Robin Inazaki 2" (稲崎露敏②, Inazaki Robin 2); 34. "Robin Inazaki 3" (稲崎露敏③, Inazaki Robin 3); 35. "Takahara Academy 1" (高原学園①, Takahara Gakuen 1); 36. "Takahara Academy 2" (高原学園②, Takahara Gakuen 2); 37. "Takahara Academy 3" (高原学園③, Takahara Gakuen 3)
Although Kiruko wishes to know what happened to the ones from Funayama Orphanage, Robin is shocked about the brain transplant, believing Dr. Sakota is responsible. As Kiruko prepares to rest, Robin instead sexually assaults her. Unable to wait more, Maru goes back to the city by force and learns Robin violated Kiruko. Enraged, Maru is beats him up until leaving him nearly dead. A free Kiruko asks Maru to stop the attack. Meanwhile, in the Academy, Mimihime fears the visions she suffers about students turning into Hirukos. As Maru and Kiruko leave the laboratory, people discover experiments involving Hirukos and corpses and ask a mercenary named Takezuka to find the related people. The academy is then attacked by an unknown chaos that wounds Shiro while protecting Mimihime and they proceed to escape. A doctor manages to protect Tokio's children but cannot tell the identity of each and marks one of them with a circle. He claims the marked child should be given to Tokio much to the staff's confusion though the director claims another.
| 7 | March 23, 2022 | 978-4-06-527299-2 | August 6, 2024 | 978-1-63442-858-3 |
38. "Dreams of Hell 1" (地獄の夢①, Jigoku no Yume 1); 39. "Dreams of Hell 2" (地獄の夢②, Jigoku no Yume 2); 40. "Dreams of Hell 3" (地獄の夢③, Jigoku no Yume 3); 41. "Day of Arrival" (お迎えの日, Omukae no Hi); 42. "Mikura 1" (ミクラ①); 43. "Mikura 2" (ミクラ②)
Kiruko and Maru meet a young girl named Helm as the latter senses Hirukos in the area. As Helm explains she was once violated by an elder, the duo helps her get revenge with such man. In the academy, several of unknown flying individuals leave the place for an operation while Kona finds Tokio with their child. Several military men attack the area forcing the teachers to hide. In the aftermath, the students Nanoha and Sachio are confused about their classmate Kaminaka Shino, who has no knowledge of her memories and instead calls herself Mikura. Meanwhile, Anzu, Tata, Shiro and Mimihime have become used to the civilization after the attack to the academy made them escape to from Heaven. However, they experience a major earthquake.
| 8 | November 22, 2022 | 978-4-06-529589-2 | June 23, 2026 | 978-1-63442-878-1 |
44. "Ties of the Land 1" (地の孤独①, Chi no Kodoku 1); 45. "Ties of the Land 2" (地の孤独②, Chi no Kodoku 2); 46. "Teruhiko Sawatari" (猿渡照彦, Sawatari Teruhiko); 47. "Shino Kaminaka" (上仲詩乃, Kaminaka Shino); 48. "Reconstruction Department" (復興省, Fukkōshō); 49. "Michika 1" (ミチカ①)
The earthquake has caused a major impact of the world in the past. Meanwhile, Maru and Kiruko spend time with a family as the former detects another Hiruko which is sealed in the sanctuary since the Edo Period. When the elder refuses such action, the duo instead to the Hamatsu Airport. It is later revealed that Takezuka is a hermaphrodite raised in Takahara by Dr. Teruhiko Sawatari, who struggled after the earthquake; the director went missing and the doctor was confused if Tokio's child was the right one or a clone. Sawatari eventually learned that Takahara is behind the world's end as they sent unknown creatures into space, which would cause an asteroid to hit the planet. Meanwhile, Mikura is revealed to be the Academy Director Shino Kaminaka using a new body as vessel. She went with her classmates, Sacchio and Nanoha, in a quest to find the ideal paradise. As time went on, Michika met a married Taka with Anzu and their child Totori and would eventually find Kiruko and Maru.
| 9 | June 22, 2023 | 978-4-06-531944-4 | December 8, 2026 | 978-1-63442-713-5 |
50. "Michika 2" (ミチカ②); 51. "Michika 3" (ミチカ③); 52. "Michika 4" (ミチカ④); 53. "Teruhiko Sakota" (迫(さこ)田(た)照(てる)彦(ひこ), Sakota Teruhiko); 54. "Anjulas 1" (アンジュラス①, Anjurasu 1); 55. "Anjulas 2" (アンジュラス②, Anjurasu 2)
Taka tries to kill Michika as he finds him dangerous but he is instead decapitated by his foe. Upon finding Kiruko and Maru as ordered, Michika convinces Maru to fight him for fun and once again remains victorious. However, the other people working alongside her fail to arrest the duo. The next day, Michika once again convinces Maru to fight, telling him she will explain everything they need if he wins. This time, Maru realizes Michika has a notable perception to movements just like him, which makes the rematch result in both fighters receiving multiple hits. Eventually, a satisfied Michika gives up and leaves with Kiruko being confused about Michika's answers, who claims they are all Hirukos. As Maru rests, Kiruko meets Teruhiko Sakota who transplanted her brain years ago after Kiriko was shot in the head. However, Kiruko believes her sister's existence remains safe. Three days later, Maru recovers and agrees with Kiruko's plan of helping with the Hiruko extermination. Sakota is shocked to see Maru, wondering if he is actually his brother Yamato and if he know his parents are Tokio and Kona. However, Maru has no memories of a family due to being put in an orphanage at young age. Sakota, revealed as Sawatari, takes the duo to Anzu to stop the man-eater but dies when fighting, leaving it to the teenagers to use their skills to stop it.
| 10 | February 22, 2024 | 978-4-06-534205-3 | — | — |
56. "Yuko Aoshima" (青(あお)島(しま)裕(ゆう)子(こ), Aoshima Yūko); 57. "Man-eaters" ("人食い", "Hito-kui"); 58. "Marin Inazaki" (稲(いな)崎(ざき)真(ま)凛(りん), Inazaki Marin); 59. "Ame-no-Nuboko" (あめのぬぼこ); 60. "Manga Road" (まんが道(みち)①, Mangamichi 1); 61. "Manga Road 2" (まんが道(みち)②, Mangamichi 2)
After Michika helps Maru finish the man-eater, the two traveling teenagers meet Dr. Yuko "Imanaga" Aoshima, who used to work in Takahara Academy with Sawatari, and believes the two should find Maru's missing family to give them an unknown medicine from Mikura in Kyushu Izukunoe Island. The two receive a robot, whose brain originally belonged to Nata, a Takahara student in the band with aid about their location. The timeline then moves to the past where a man named Toru worked for a gang and a young Robin lived peacefully with his younger sister Marin. Back into the present, Kiruko and Maru travel to Suita, Osaka to find a Funayama Orphanage and discover an area called New Heaven where Bandits Ohwl befriend them. A manga artist offers them the location of its former residents in exchange of help. The two accept and investigate areas that contain the manga but are forced to escape when a Hiruko attacks them with electricity. In the meantime, Kiruko finds a map of Aoshima, Ehime where Takahara was kept. As Kiruko and Maru deliver the work to the manga author, an older Toru appears.
| 11 | October 22, 2024 | 978-4-06-537054-4 | — | — |
62. "Toru Funayama 1" (船(ふな)山(やま) 通(とおる)①, Funayama Tōru 1); 63. "Toru Funayama 2" (船(ふな)山(やま) 通(とおる)②, Funayama Tōru 2); 64. "Toru Funayama 3" (船(ふな)山(やま) 通(とおる)③, Funayama Tōru 3); 65. "Manaka Mikura 1" (三(み)倉(くら)まなか①, Mikura Manaka 1); 66. "Manaka Mikura 2" (三(み)倉(くら)まなか②, Mikura Manaka 2); 67. "Manaka Mikura 3" (三(み)倉(くら)まなか③, Mikura Manaka 3)
| 12 | July 23, 2025 | 978-4-06-540046-3 | — | — |
68. "Monster" (バケモノ, Bakemono); 69. "Izukunoe Island II 1" (いずくのえ島 II ①, Izukunoe Shima II 1); 70. "Izukunoe Island II 2" (いずくのえ島 II ②, Izukunoe Shima II 2); 71. "Izukunoe Island II 3" (いずくのえ島 II ③, Izukunoe Shima II 3); 72. "Inori Village 1" (いのり村①, Inori Mura 1); 73. "Inori Village 2" (いのり村②, Inori Mura 2)
| 13 | February 20, 2026 | 978-4-06-542481-0 | — | — |
74. "Inori Village 3" (いのり村③, Inori Mura 3); 75. "The Heart" (心臓, Shinzō); 76. "Izukunoe Island I" (いずくのえ島 I, Izukunoe Shima I); 77. "Nonoko" (ノノコ); 78. "Fission" (分裂, Bunretsu); 79. "Yamato" (ヤマト)
| 14 | October 22, 2026 | 978-4-06-545202-8 | — | — |
80. "Yamato 2" (ヤマト II, Yamato II); 81. "Demon Busters 1" (妖怪バスターズ①, Yōkai Basutāzu 1); 82. "Demon Busters 2" (妖怪バスターズ②, Yōkai Basutāzu 2); 83. "Yama-to City 1" (ヤマ都①, Yama-to 1); 84. "Yama-to City 2" (ヤマ都②, Yama-to 2); 85. "Yama-to City 3" (ヤマ都③, Yama-to 3)

=== Chapters not yet in tankōbon format ===
86. "Shino Kaminaka 1" (上仲詩乃(1)①, Kaminaka Shino (1) 1)
