= Aji River =

Aji River may refer to:

- Aji River (Gujarat), India
- Aji Chay, a river in East Azerbaijan Province, Iran
- Aji River (Osaka), Japan, adjacent to the Nishi-Osaka Route

== See also ==
- Aji (disambiguation)
