= Ōkunoshima =

Japanese island with a population of feral rabbits

Native name: 大久野島
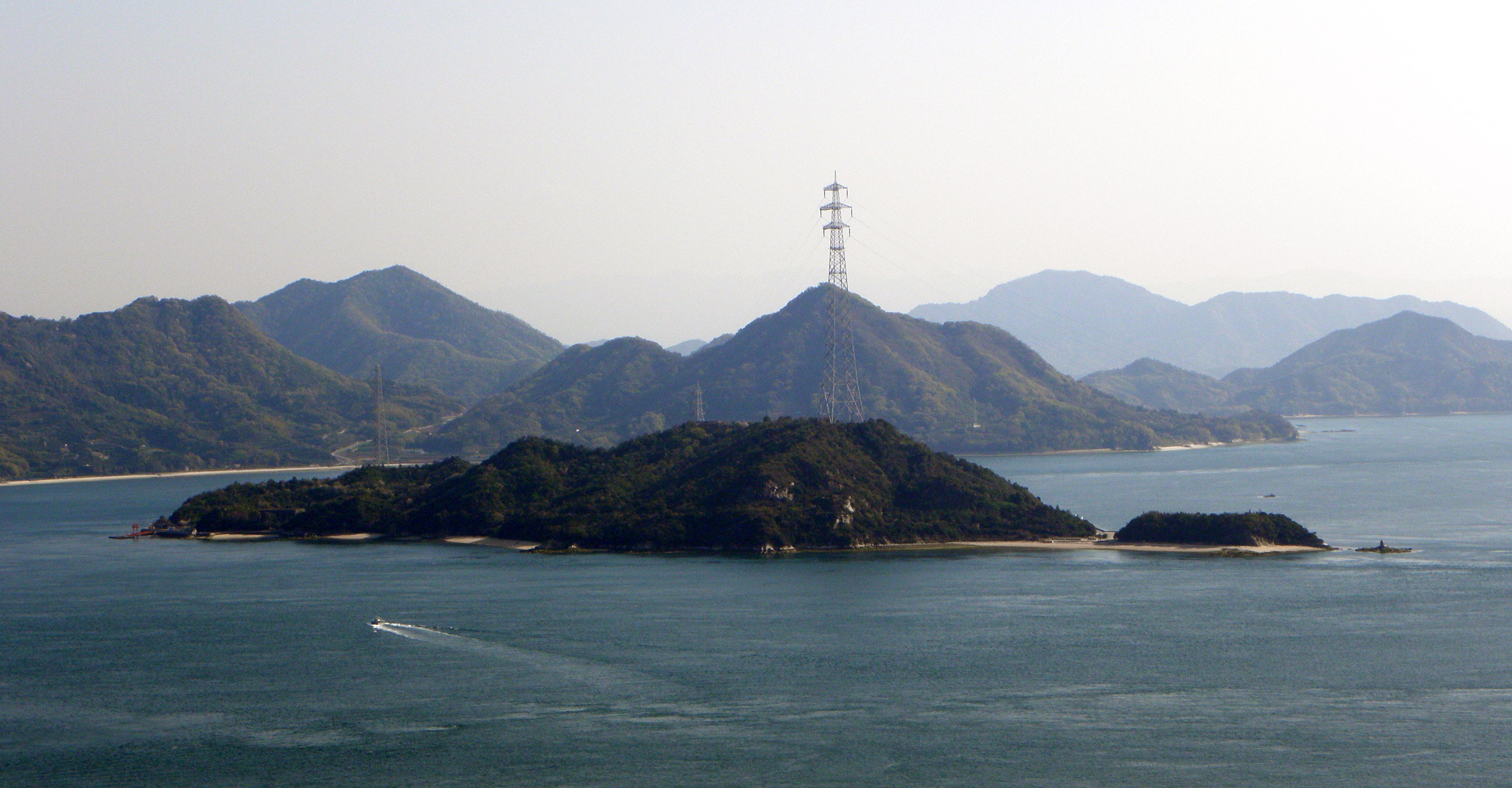
- A view of Ōkunoshima from Kurotaki-yama.

- Location within Japan

Geography
- Location: Seto Inland Sea
- Coordinates: 34°18′33″N 132°59′36″E

Administration
- Japan
- Region: Chūgoku (San'yō)
- Prefecture: Hiroshima Prefecture
- City: Takehara

Ōkunoshima (Japanese: 大久野島) is a small island in the Seto Inland Sea of Japan. It is considered to be part of the city of Takehara, Hiroshima Prefecture. In 1925, the Imperial Japanese Army built a poison gas factory on the island to contribute to Japan's chemical warfare program during the Second Sino-Japanese War. After World War II, Ōkunoshima was redeveloped as a park, and domestic rabbits were released on the island. Due to the rapidity of rabbit reproduction, the current population of rabbits is estimated to be in the thousands.

Due to the large rabbit population, Ōkunoshima has become a popular tourist attraction, gaining the nickname Usagi Shima (うさぎ島, "Rabbit Island").

== History ==
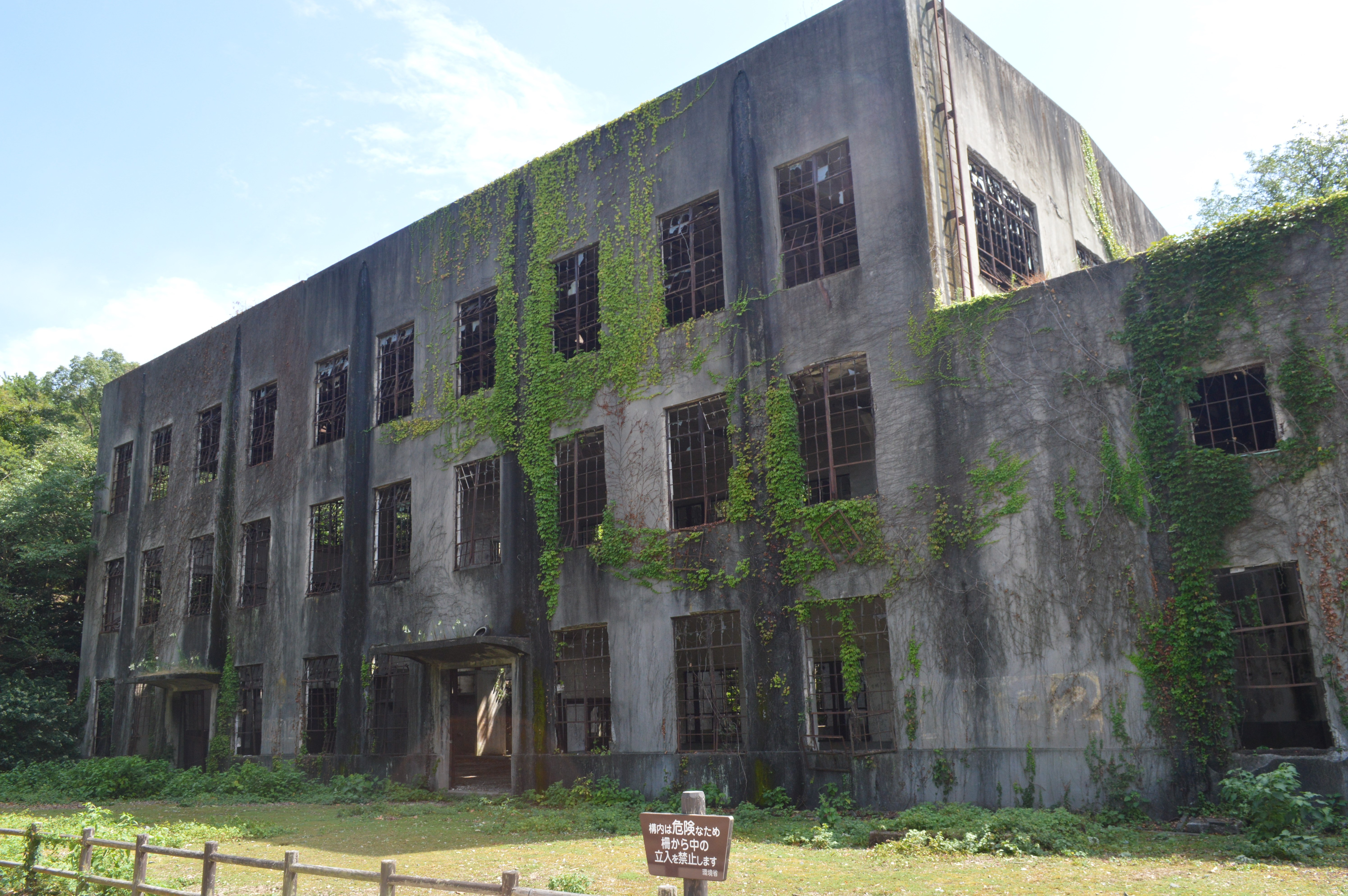
The ruins of the gas manufacturing plant (and the power station pictured here that supplied it) are still standing today.

The island was a cultivated area until the Russo-Japanese War when ten forts were built to protect it. Three fishing families lived on the island.

In 1925, the Imperial Japanese Army Institute of Science and Technology initiated a secret program to develop chemical weapons, based on extensive research that showed that chemical weapons were being produced throughout the United States and Europe. A chemical munitions plant was built on the island from 1927 to 1929 and was home to a chemical weapons facility that would go on to produce over six kilotons of mustard gas and tear gas.

Japan was a signatory of the 1925 Geneva Protocol, which banned the use of chemical warfare but not the development and storage of chemical weapons. Nevertheless, Japan went to great lengths to keep the chemical munitions plant a secret, even going so far as to remove records of the island from some maps. The island was chosen for its isolation, security, and distance from Tokyo and other areas in case of disaster. Under the jurisdiction of the Japanese military, the local fish preservation processor was converted into a toxic gas reactor. Residents and potential employees were not told what the plant was manufacturing, and everything was kept secret. Working conditions were harsh and many suffered from toxic-exposure related illnesses due to inadequate safety equipment. Approximately 200 rabbits were used in experiments aimed to test the efficacy of gas that was used in the Second Sino-Japanese War and for arming balloon bombs that targeted the United States. When the factory was demolished, these rabbits were likely euthanized or killed. While scientists have not ruled out a genetic link between the lab rabbits and the current rabbit population, the probability that they are related is very low.

When World War II ended, documents concerning the plant were burned and Allied Occupation Forces disposed of the gas either by dumping, burning, or burying it. People were told to be silent about the project, and several decades would pass before victims from the plant were given government aid for treatment. The manufacture of chemical weapons on the island did not become public knowledge until the 1980s.

In the early 1970s, a local elementary school released a small number of rabbits on Ōkunoshima, hoping to revive the island. Due to a lack of predators on the island, the rabbits have been habituated. In 1988, the Ōkunoshima Poison Gas Museum was opened. While ruins of the old forts and the gas factory still exist all over the island, entry is prohibited as it is considered too dangerous. As Ōkunoshima is part of the Inland Sea National Park system of Japan, there is a resource center and a museum.

In the present day, the island is inhabited by a large population of rabbits. In 2024, nearly 200,000 people visited Ōkunoshima. The island is accessible by ferry from Tadanoumi and Ōmishima.

== Rabbit population ==
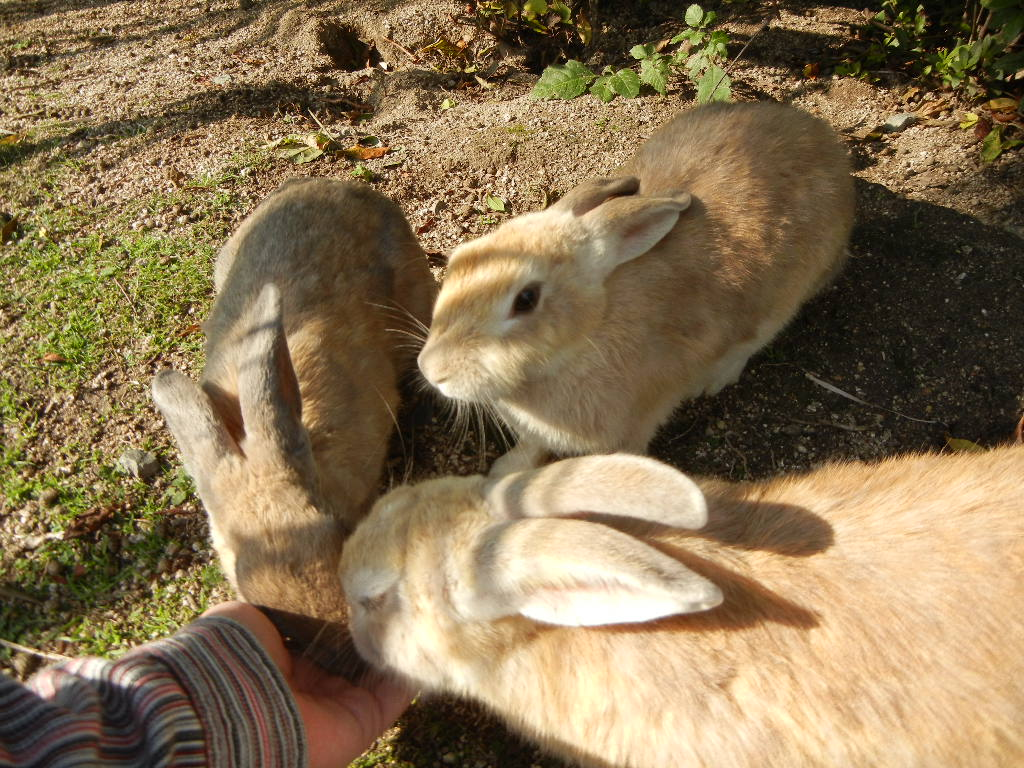
Rabbits on the island

This island is currently inhabited by a large population of rabbits. Many of them are descended from rabbits intentionally let loose when the island was developed as a park after World War II. During the war, rabbits were also used in the chemical munitions plant for testing the effectiveness of the chemical weapons, but those rabbits were euthanized or killed when the factory was demolished and are not related to the rabbits currently on the island. Hunting the rabbits is forbidden, and dogs and cats are not allowed on the island. In 2015, the BBC presented a short television series called Pets – Wild at Heart, which featured the island's rabbit population and the tourists that came to feed them.

== Poison Gas Museum ==
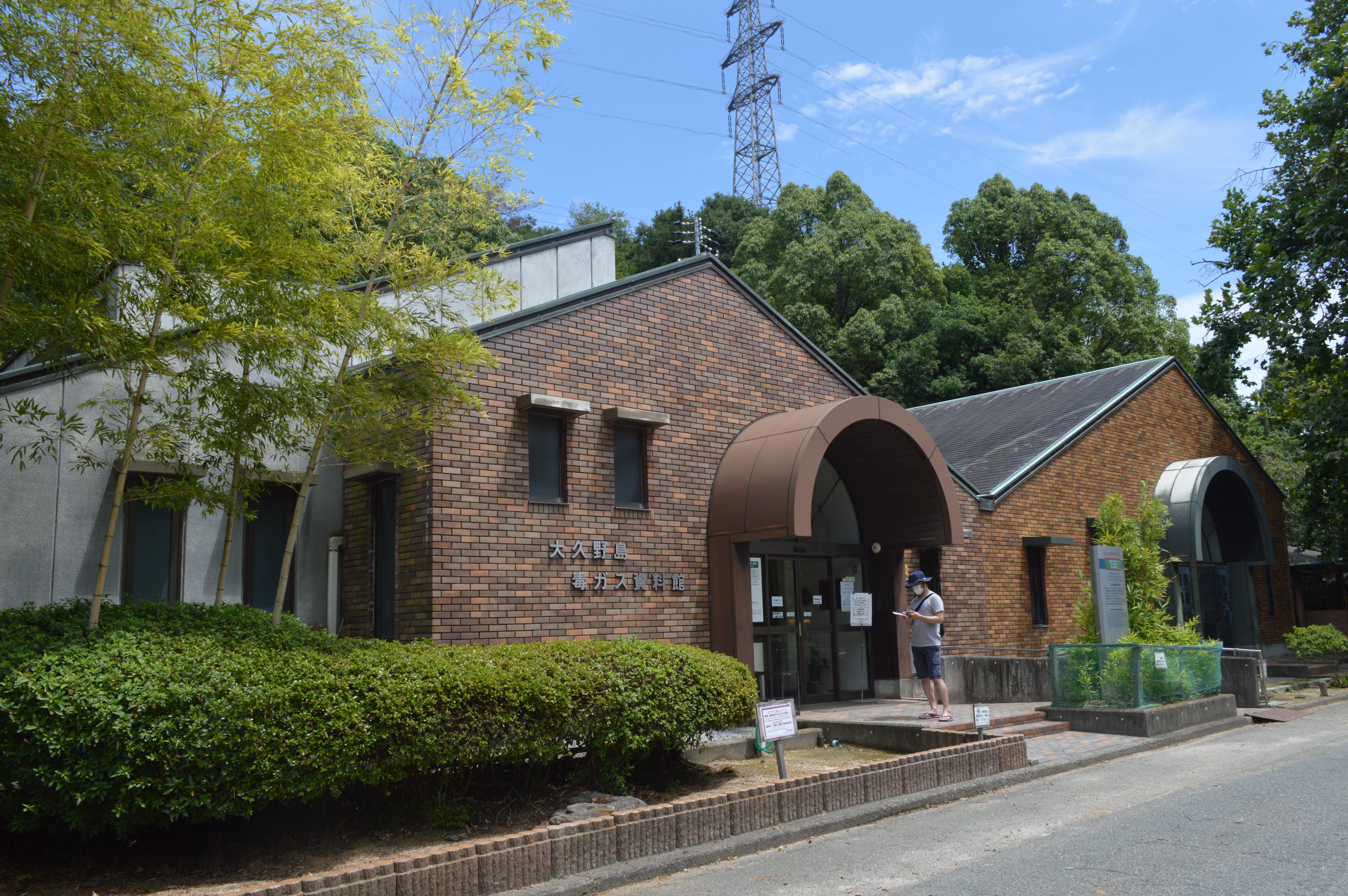
The Poison Gas Museum opened in 1988 to educate people about the island's role in World War II.

The Poison Gas Museum was opened in 1988 and "was established in order to alert as many people as possible to the dreadful truths about poison gas." As expressed by its curator, Murakami Hatsuichi, to The New York Times, "My hope is that people will see the museum in Hiroshima City and also this one, so they will learn that we [Japanese] were both victims and aggressors in the war. I hope people will realize both facets and recognize the importance of peace."

The small museum is only two rooms large and provides a basic overview of the construction of the chemical plant, working conditions, and the effects of poison gas on humans. Families of workers who suffered the aftereffects of the harsh working conditions donated numerous artifacts to help tell the story of the workers' plight. The second room shows how poison gas affects the human body through the lungs, eyes, skin, and heart. Images of victims from Iraq and Iran add to the message of the museum.

The museum also offers guides to the numerous remains of the forts from the Second Sino-Japanese War and the poison gas factory. Most of the buildings are run-down and condemned, but still recognizable.

The museum is aimed primarily at Japanese tourists, but English translations are provided on the overall summary for each section.

== Other buildings and structures ==
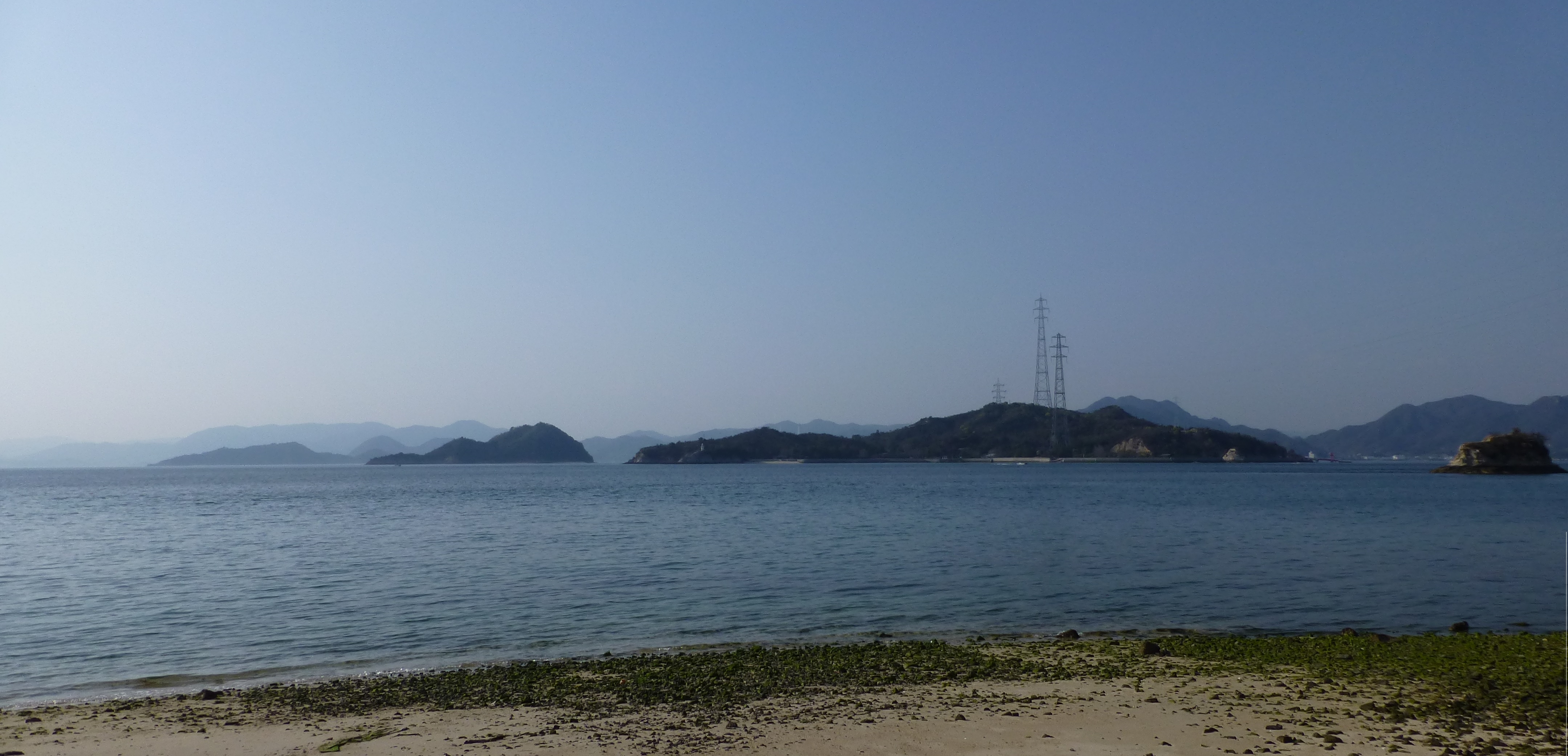
Ōkunoshima seen from the island of Ōmishima, in the southeast. The pylon on the right is 226 metres high, the tallest in Japan.

The island is connected to Takehara on the mainland by Chūshi Powerline Crossing, the tallest powerline in Japan.

== See also ==
- Cat islands in Japan
