= Aji Island =

Island in Miyagi, Japan

Coordinates: 38.265°N 141.480°E

Native name: 網地島
- Location within Japan

Geography
- Location: Pacific Ocean

Administration
- Japan
- Prefecture: Miyagi
- City: Ishinomaki

Aji Island (網地島, Ajishima), an island in the Pacific Ocean off the eastern coast of Honshu, Japan's largest island is situated in the Miyagi Prefecture, southwest of the Oshika Peninsula. Aji Island neighbors Tashirojima Island, which is commonly known as "Cat Island" due to its large population of stray cats.

Aji Island is home to several ports including Aji Port which is located at the northern tip of the island, and Nagato Port (also known as Futawashi Port) which lies at the southern tip of Aji Island.

The predominant landscape of the island consists of dense forests, with vast majority of the islands covered in diverse flora.

There are also many historical sites on the island including Ogane Shrine, Kumano Shrine, Kongoji Temple, and Joshunji Temple.

== History ==
It is estimated that settlements have been present on the island for approximately two thousand years.

Aji Island is one of the first locations that marked a relationship between Japan and Russia, when local citizens traded with a Russian expedition.

== March 2011 earthquake ==
The epicenter of the major Tōhoku earthquake and tsunami that struck Japan on 11 March 2011 was located off the coast of Aji Island and Miyagi Prefecture. The Tōhoku region, including Aji Island, suffered serious damages . The natural disaster was devastating to the island's economy, accelerating the rate at which citizens were moving away from the island. Since the natural disaster, Aji Islanders have been attempting to rebuild the island and increase population levels through agricultural and society-enriching activities.

== Principal products ==
Produce grown on the island consists mainly of sweet potatoes.

A variety of fish and seafood are harvested in the waters around the island, including salmon and sea urchin. On July 4, 2014, the sale of Ginzake salmon caught in local waters was reallowed, lifting the restriction on it after the 2011 earthquake. It was first allowed in 2007 and proved to be popular and profitable.

== Population ==
Aji Island has an aging population. Due to local need, the Amishoiin medical care center has been created to serve the island population.
