= Aoshima, Ehime =

Island in Japan

Aoshima
Native name: 青島 (Aoshima)
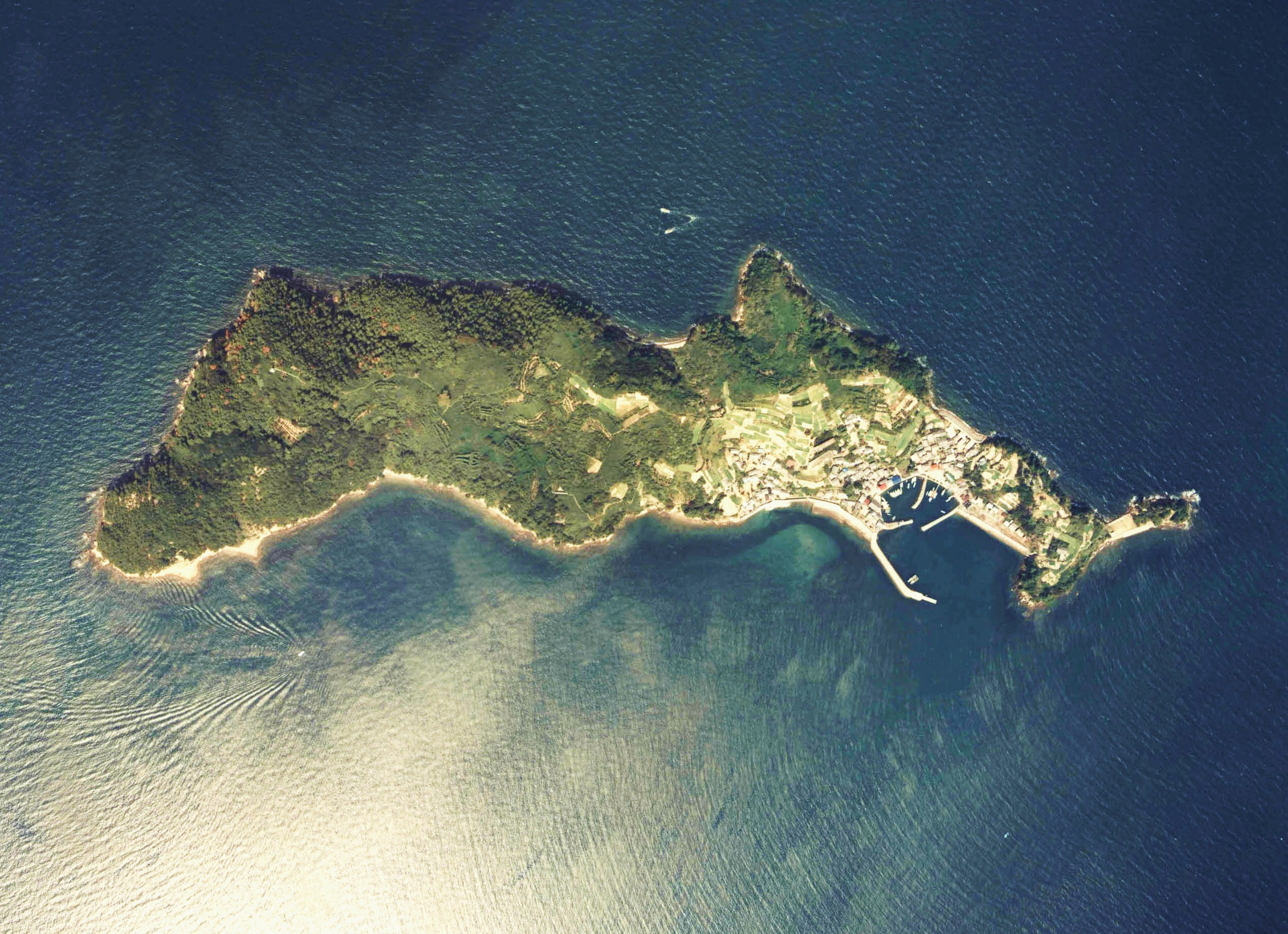
- Aerial view of Aoshima in 1981

- Location within Japan

Geography
- Location: Seto Inland Sea
- Coordinates: 33.736°N 132.482°E
- Area: 0.49 km^{2} (0.19 sq mi)
- Coastline: 4.2 km (2.61 mi)
- Highest elevation: 90.8 m (297.9 ft)

Administration
- Japan
- Region: Shikoku
- Prefecture: Ehime Prefecture
- City: Ōzu, Ehime

Demographics
- Population: 4 (2024)
- Ethnic groups: Japanese

Aoshima (Japanese: 青島, Hepburn: Aoshima), also known as Cat Island (Japanese: 猫の島, Hepburn: Neko no shima), is an island in Ehime Prefecture, Japan, known for its large number of feline residents and small number of people. Felines have been reported by news outlets to outnumber humans by ratios between 6:1 and 10:1, but as elderly inhabitants of the island have died, the ratio has greatly increased, to almost 36:1. (Note: As of 2019, Asahi Shimbun Globe reports the human population at 6, and AERA dot reports that there were at least 220 cats on the island in October 2018.) Cats were introduced to combat rodents on fishing boats but remained on the island and reproduced in large numbers.

The human population on the island has decreased since sardine fisheries became depleted and jobs moved to cities. As of December 2024, only four people are still living on Aoshima, while the number of cats has dropped to 80.

== Geography ==
The island is roughly 1.6 kilometres (1 mi) long. It was formerly part of Nagahama in Kita District, but as of 2005, it is part of Ōzu city.

== History ==
Originally, Aoshima was an uninhabited island. The village was formed in 1639 by the collective relocation of 16 families and their descendants from Sakoshi Village in Banshu (now Sakoshi, Akō city), and developed as a sardine fishing village with a secondary farming industry.

However, over the years, the sardine trade has dwindled, and the majority of people have abandoned the island to seek a better life on the mainland.

Aoshima Elementary School was closed in March 1979 and converted into a community center. It is currently used as a temporary accommodation facility for visitors to the island.

Since 2024, the number of restricted areas on Aoshima has been increasing. The road leading to the breakwater has been closed off. Entry to areas inhabited by residents is also prohibited. Due to weather conditions – typhoons, heavy rains, and strong winds – abandoned houses have collapsed and blocked some roads. There is a possibility that the island will become uninhabited within the next five years.

== Population ==
In 1945, the island was a fishing village with a population of approximately 900. The number of households peaked at 165 in 1960.

In 2013, the island was estimated to be home to 50 residents. In 2018, Ehime Shimbun reported that the population had decreased to 13 with an average age of "over 75". In 2019, The Asahi Shimbun Globe reported that only six residents remained on the island.

The New York Times reported on 10 May 2023 that the island's human population had dropped to five.

== Cats ==
Aoshima was formerly the home of a fishing village supported by the sardine trade; fishermen would bring cats with them to control the rodent problem, and would often leave cats on the island as they departed. As cats bred, the population grew.

The feline inhabitants of Aoshima are fed by food donations from all over Japan. They also eat small animals on the island and food from visitors.

The feline population of the island has been reported as between 120 and 130 between 2015 and 2018. In February 2018, it was reported by Ehime Shimbun that all cats on the island would be spayed or neutered to lower the feline population as a response to the declining human population. By October, 210 cats had been spayed and neutered, with another estimated 10 cats uncaptured that had been hidden by an old resident who opposed the program.

In December 2024, the inhabitants of Aoshima comprise only 4 elderly residents and approximately 80 cats. All known cats are over the age of seven, and an estimated third of them are battling illnesses, including blindness and respiratory diseases, caused by decades of inbreeding.

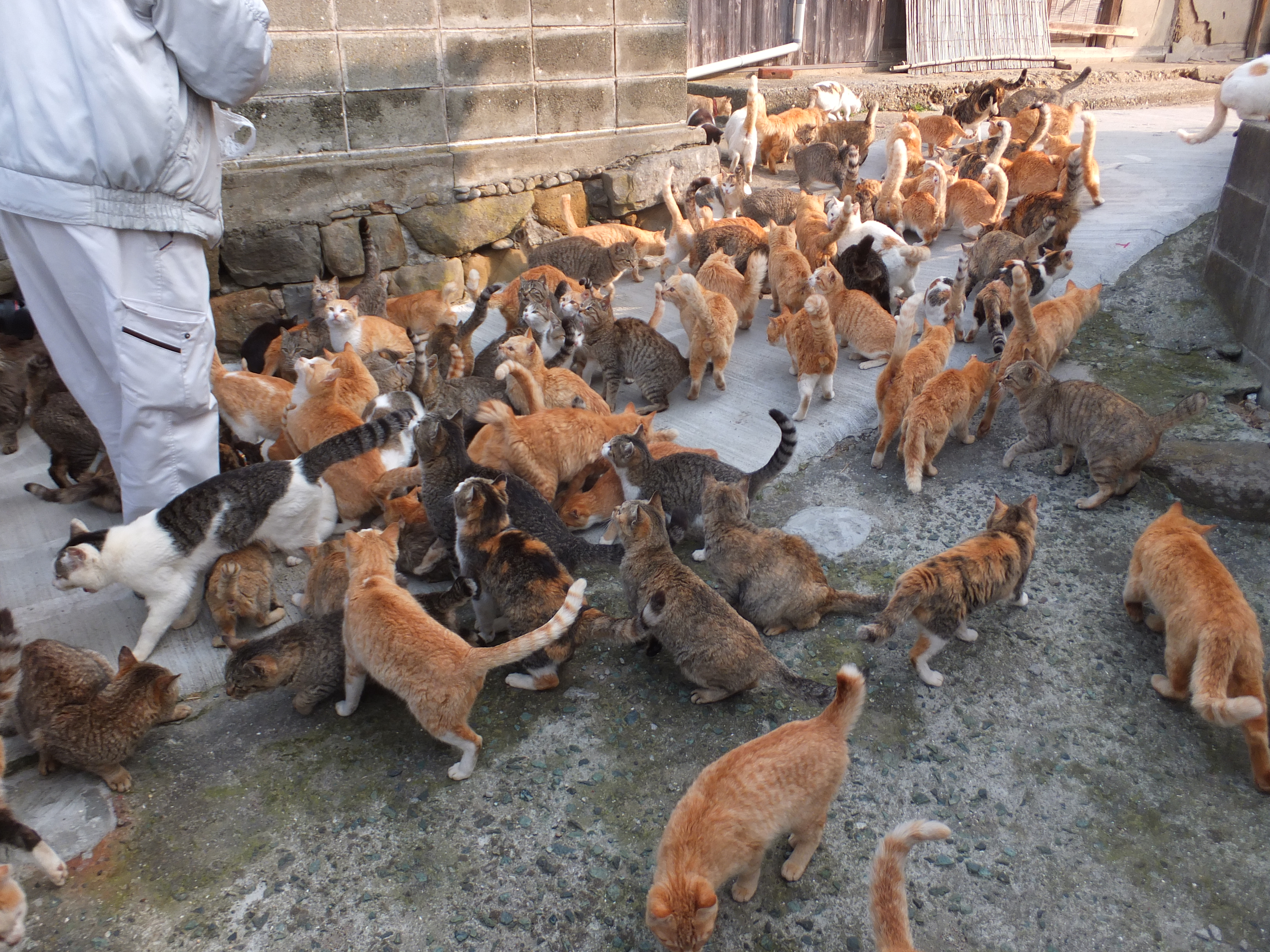
Cats scooping food at the port.

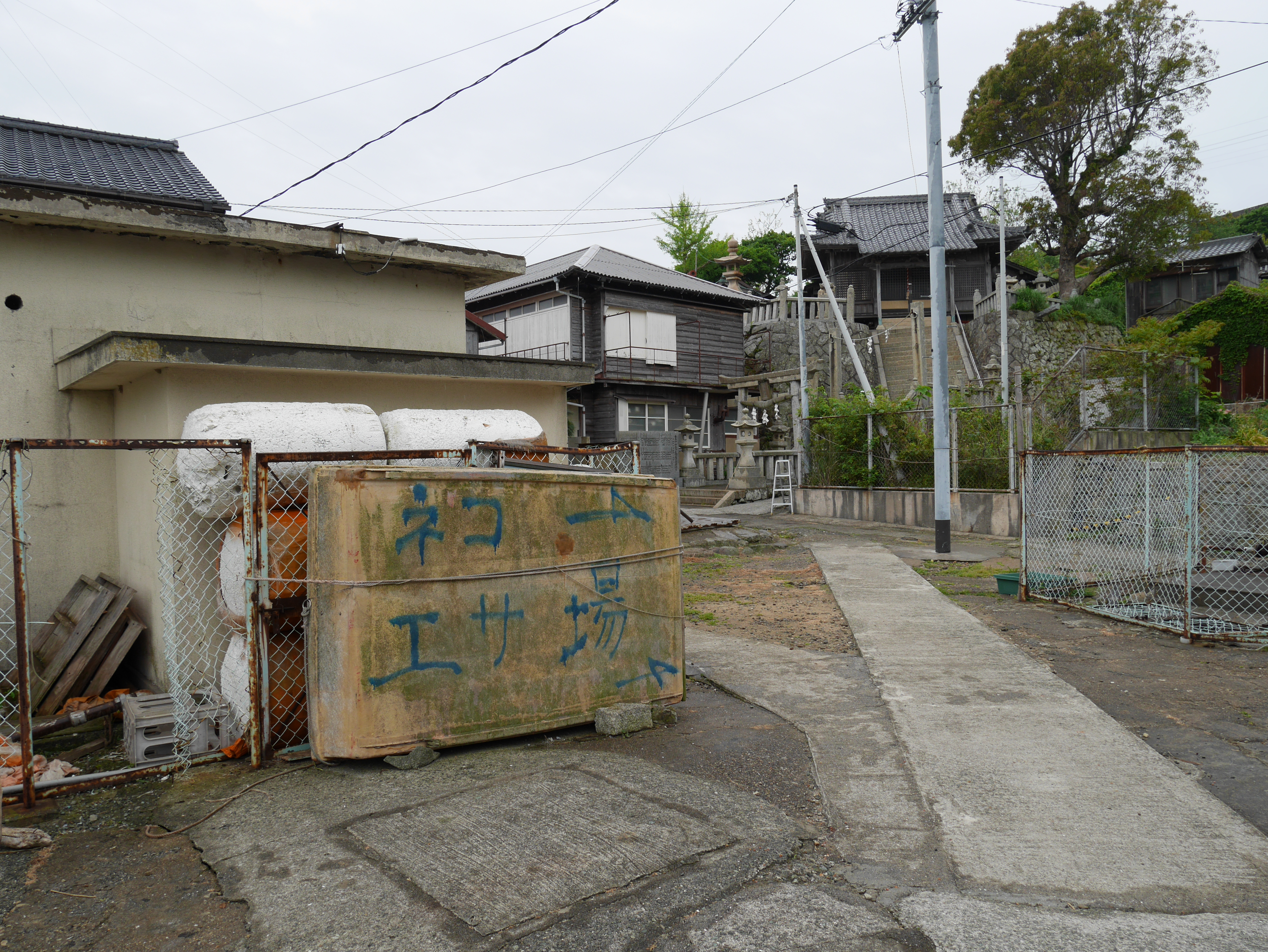
Designated cat feeding area a few minutes from the port. The back is Aoshima Shrine.

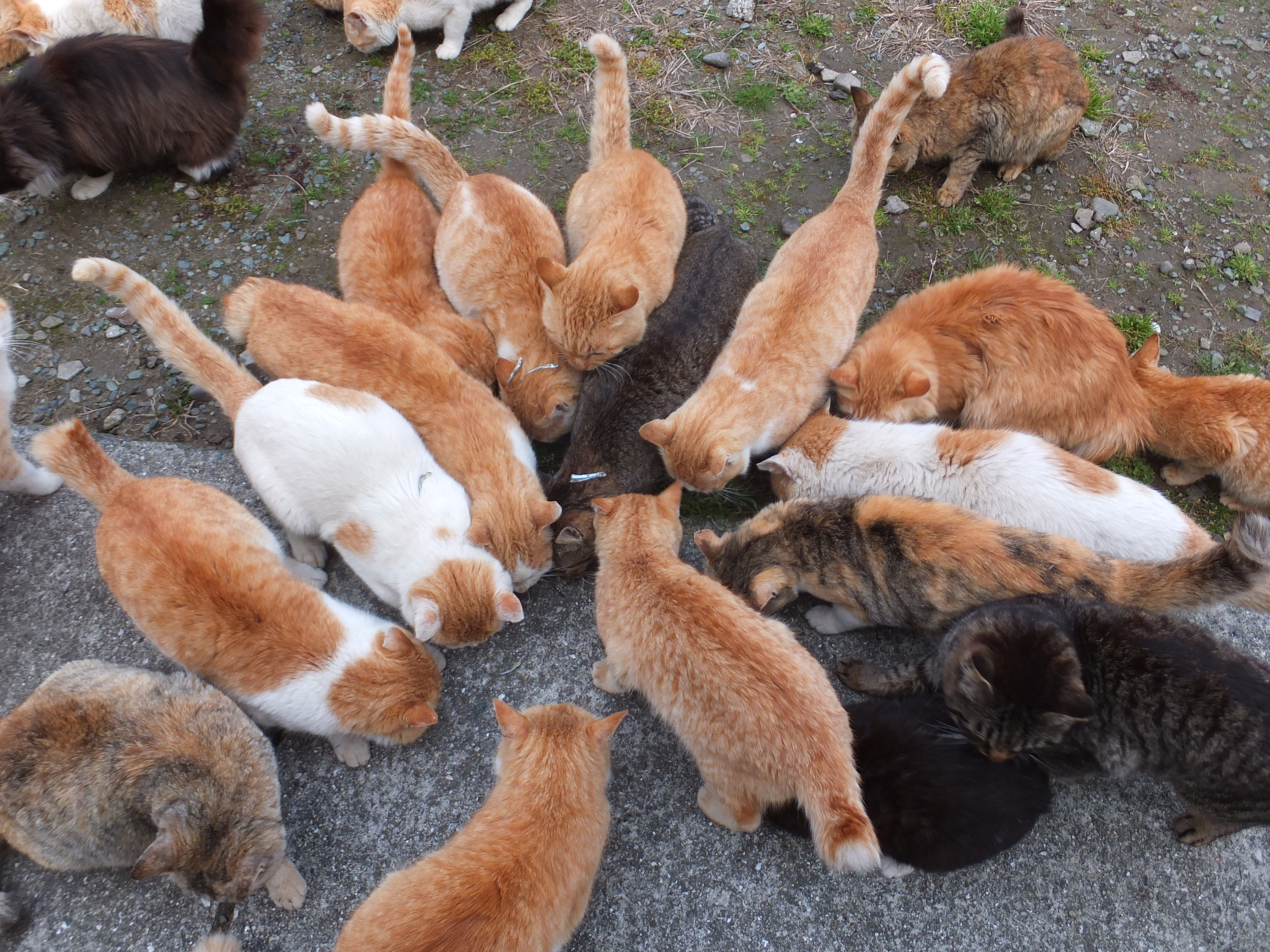
Cats eating food given at the designated cat feeding area.

== Tourism ==
The island attracts tourists who come to see the cats and give them food.

== Transport links ==
Aoshima is accessible via ferry. Two return trips run daily from Nagahama Port in Ōzu, accessible from Iyo-Nagahama Station. The ferry takes 35 minutes each way.

== See also ==
- Ainoshima, known as "Cat Heaven Island", located in Shingū, Fukuoka Prefecture
- Tashirojima, another Japanese "Cat Island", located in Ishinomaki, Miyagi Prefecture
- Ōkunoshima, known as Usagi-jima ("Rabbit Island") for its feral rabbit population
