= Cat Island (Rodrigues) =

Island in the Indian Ocean

Native name: Île aux Chats
- Interactive map of Cat Island

Geography
- Location: Indian Ocean
- Coordinates: 19°46′S 63°26′E
- Archipelago: Rodrigues

Administration
- Mauritius

Additional information
- Time zone: MUT (UTC+4)

Cat Island (French: Île aux Chats) is a small island lying south of Rodrigues in the Indian Ocean. It is surrounded by a coral reef and is known for diving and snorkelling sites.
