= Cat Island (Louisiana) =

Island in Cat Bay, Louisiana, US

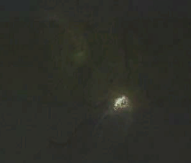
- Cat Island in 2016
- Interactive map of Cat Island

Geography
- Location: Cat Bay
- Coordinates: 29.3631°N 89.8539°W

Administration
- United States
- State: Louisiana

Demographics
- Population: Uninhabitated

Cat Island was a marshy island in Cat Bay in the Mississippi River Delta. It was a nesting ground of pelicans and other birds. During the BP oil spill, the island was heavily affected and the plants that once kept the island from erosion disappeared.
