= Japanese military =

Japanese military may refer to:

- Military history of Japan
- Imperial Japanese Armed Forces, 1868-1945
- Japan Self-Defense Forces, 1954-present
