= Kakarajima =

Japanese island

Coordinates: 33°36′0″N 129°52′0″E

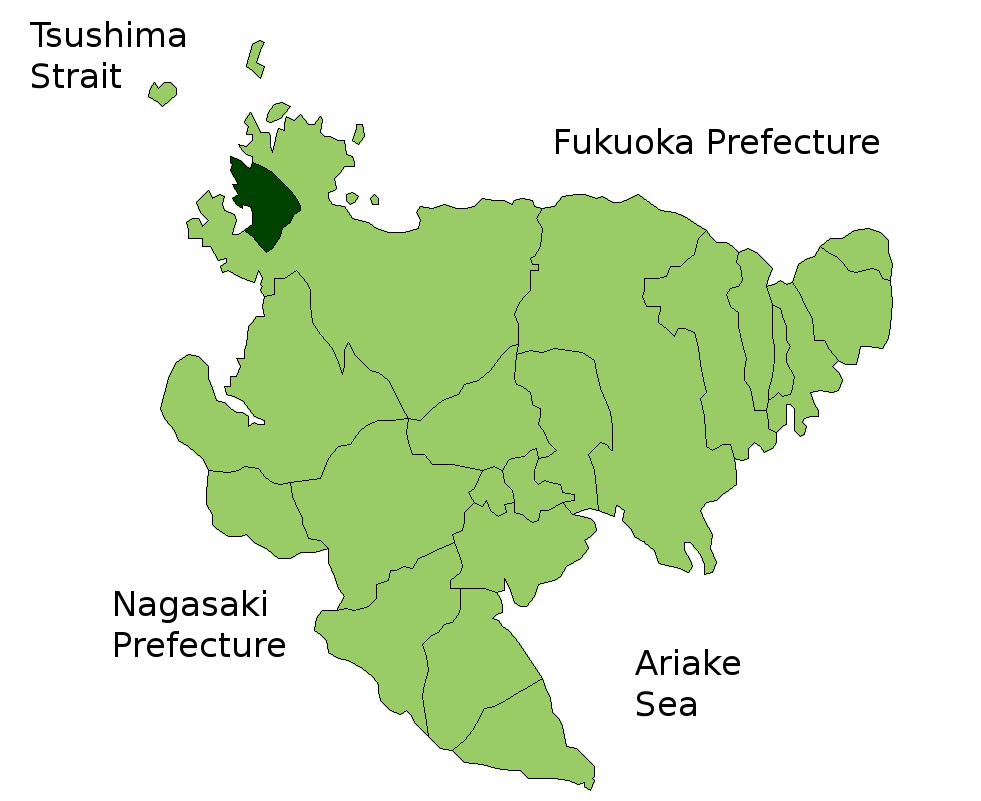
Kakarajima is the island furthest north on this map

Kakarajima or Kagarashima (加唐島), also known as Kakara, is an island to the north of Yobuko, which is in the Higashimatsuura District of Saga Prefecture, Japan. It is 2.82 kilometres (1.75 mi) long from north to south, and three quarters of a mile wide, with steep shores. In 1884, it was reported that a cable had been laid between Korea and Japan, with an intermediate station on Kagara Island. The island is a protected area for the vulnerable yellow bunting (Emberiza sulphurata).
