= Okishima =

Island in Biwa lake, Shiga, Japan

Coordinates: 35°12′28″N 136°03′51″E

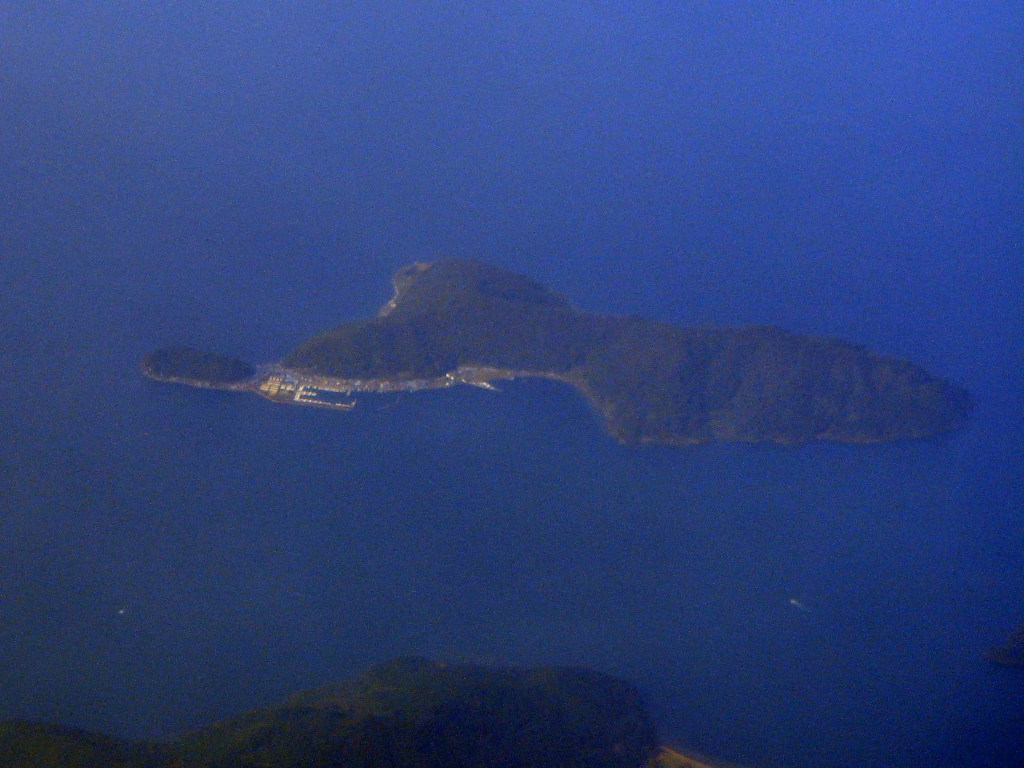
Okishima

Okishima (沖島, Okishima) or Okinoshima (沖ノ島, Okinoshima) is an island in Shiga Prefecture, Japan. It is part of Biwako Quasi National Park. It is the largest island of Lake Biwa and is administered by the city of Ōmihachiman.

== Transport ==
Okishima is accessible by ferry from Horikiri Port, Ōmihachiman.
