= Tashirojima =

Island in Miyagi, Japan

Native name: 田代島 (tashirojima)
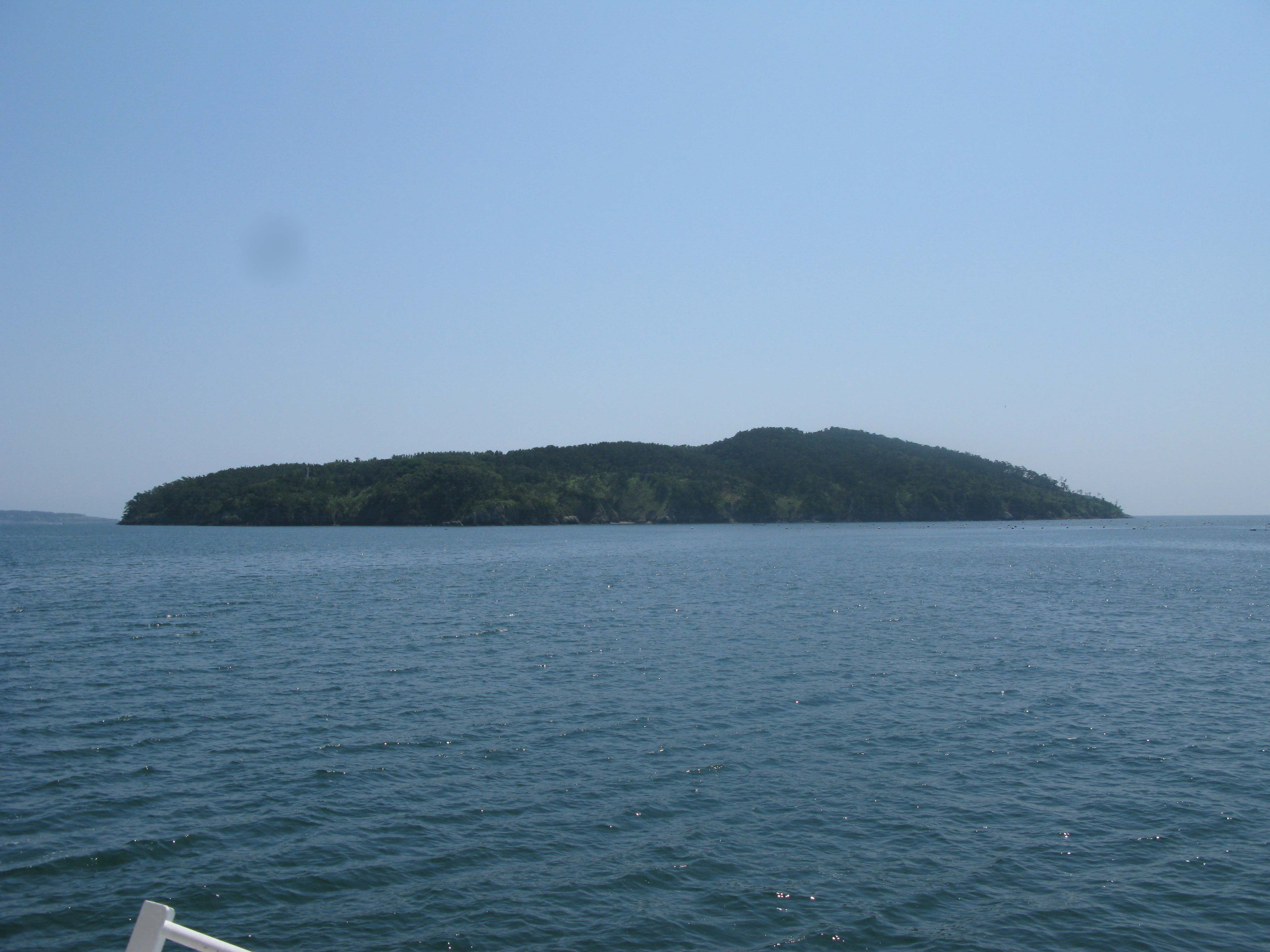
- View of Tashirojima from the west side

- Location within Japan

Geography
- Location: Pacific Ocean
- Coordinates: 38°18′N 141°25′E
- Area: 3.14 km^{2} (1.21 sq mi)
- Coastline: 11.5 km (7.15 mi)
- Highest elevation: 96.2 m (315.6 ft)
- Highest point: Shojima Mountain (正島山, shojimayama)

Administration
- Japan
- Prefecture: Miyagi
- City: Ishinomaki

Tashirojima (Japanese: 田代島) is a small island in Ishinomaki, Miyagi Prefecture, Japan. It lies in the Pacific Ocean off the Oshika Peninsula, to the north of Aji Island. The population was around 80 people in 2015, compared to around 1,000 in the 1950s. It has become known as "Cat Island" owing to its large stray cat population, which thrives due to the local belief that feeding cats brings wealth and good fortune. The cat population exceeds the human population on the island and pet dogs are not allowed.

The island is divided into two villages/ports, Oodomari and Nitoda. Aji Island previously belonged to the town of Oshika, while Tashirojima was part of Ishinomaki. In April 2005, Oshika merged with Ishinomaki, so both islands are now part of the city. Since 83% of the population was classified as elderly, the villages have been designated a "terminal village" (限界集落, genkai-shūraku), meaning that the survival of the village is threatened. Most residents work in fishing or hospitality.

The island is also known as Manga Island, as manga artist Shotaro Ishinomori had planned to move there shortly before his death. The island features manga-themed lodges designed to resemble cats.

== History ==
In Japan's late Edo period, much of the island raised silkworms for textiles. Residents kept cats to chase mice away from the silkworms. In 1602, all pet cats in Japan were freed by decree to combat the rampant rodent population that threatened the silkworm industry. The release of Tashirojima's pet cats is what created the island's thriving wild population.

In 1989, Tashiro Elementary School closed and was turned into an educational center, which itself closed in 2008. In 2000, Manga Island, a tourist facility, was built. In 2007, a 6 km (4 mi) and 10 km (6 mi) race called the Hyokkori Hyōtan Tashirojima Marathon was held.

In 2011, the island was hit by the Tōhoku tsunami, which destroyed the harbor and caused ground subsidence, leaving the villages more exposed to flooding during high tides and strong coastal winds. The local cat population fled inland to escape the tsunami, and only a portion returned to the villages afterward. The tsunami also caused an outbreak of parvo in the region, and at least 80 cats on Tashirojima were captured and vaccinated in a matter of days to prevent the disease. Due to the loss of the harbor, which had supported the ferry service and the island's small fishing industry, several fishers and their families moved away.

By 2015, government workers had rebuilt much of the harbor to raise the coastline and stop the floods, but the island's fishing industry remained diminished. Tourism, however, remained steady, and at least two regular visitors to the island had taken up residence there.

== Feline population ==
By 2015, the human population numbered around 80, while the total cat population exceeded that by several hundred, with at least 150 cats permanently residing in one of the villages. A vet visited the island every two months to examine the village-dwelling cats. While the cat population consists mainly of crossbreeds and mixed breed cats, one distinct breed commonly seen among the island's feline population is the Japanese Bobtail.

In Japanese culture, cats are considered to bring good luck, said to attract money and good fortune to those who cross their path. Some even claim that it was the cats who kept the majority of the island from being destroyed during the Tōhoku earthquake and tsunami in 2011.

== Cat shrine ==
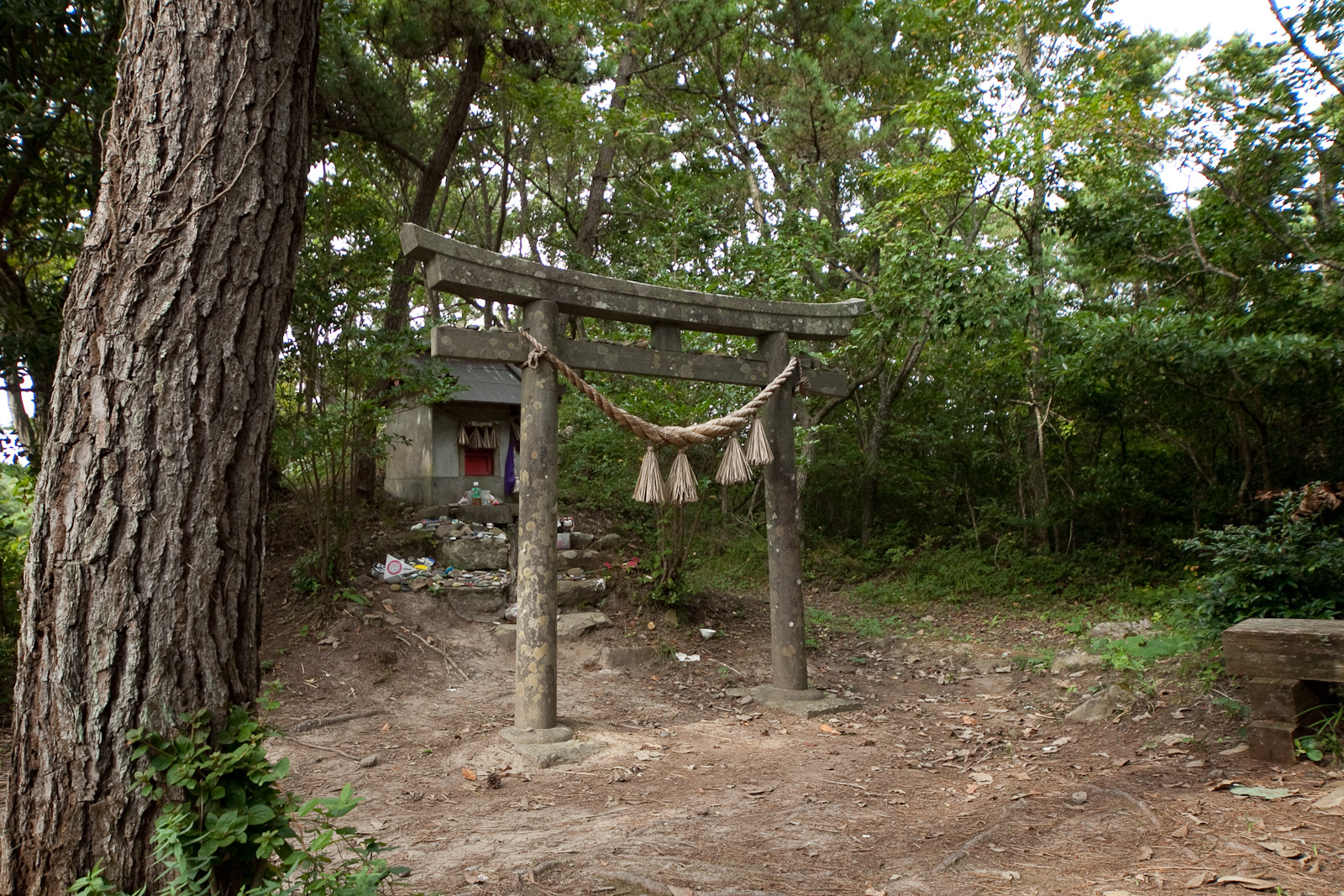
Tashirojima's cat shrine

There is a small cat shrine, known as neko-jinja (猫神社), in the middle of the island, roughly situated between the two villages. In the past, islanders raised silkworms for silk, and cats were kept to control the mouse population, as mice are natural predators of silkworms. Fixed-net fishing became common on the island after the Edo period, and fishers from other areas would stay on the island overnight.

The cats would visit the inns where the fishers stayed and beg for scraps. Over time, the fishers developed a fondness for the cats and began interpreting their actions as predictors of the weather and fish behavior. One day, while collecting rocks for use with fixed nets, a stray rock fell and killed one of the cats. Feeling remorse, the fishers buried the cat and enshrined it at that location on the island.

There are at least ten cat shrines in Miyagi Prefecture. There are also 51 stone monuments shaped like cats, an unusually high number compared to other prefectures. These shrines and monuments are primarily concentrated in the southern part of the island, where silkworm cultivation was once a common practice.

== In media ==
In 2004, a couple moved to the island from Sendai and opened an inn for travelers called Hamaya. In 2006, they started a blog about the island and its inhabitants. In May 2006, Terebi Asahi filmed an episode of Jinsei no Rakuen (人生の楽園) on the island, which mentioned the large cat population. Fuji Terebi's film Nyanko the Movie (にゃんこ the Movie) featured a story about Droopy-Eared Jack (たれ耳ジャック, Tare Mimi Jack), one of the island's cats. The movie was spun off into a series, the latest of which, Nyanko the Movie 4, was released in July 2010. Each installment has included an update on Jack. As a result, many cat lovers visit the island, and package tours specifically to "look for Jack" are now available. Cat photo contests and exhibitions are also held on the island.

In 2012, the BBC in the UK aired a short television series titled Pets – Wild at Heart, which featured the behaviour of pets, including the cats on Tashirojima.

In 2015, Landon Donoho, an independent filmmaker, crowd-funded a documentary titled Cat Heaven Island. It follows the stories of the island's inhabitants, both human and feline.

== Local products ==
- Oysters
- Abalone

== Access ==
- 40 minutes on the Ajishima Line ferry. Tashirojima is about 15 km (9 mi) from downtown Ishinomaki.

== See also ==
- Cat islands in Japan
- Ōkunoshima, known as Usagi-jima ("Rabbit Island") for its feral rabbit population
