= Osaka Prefectural Museum of Yayoi Culture =

- 大阪府立弥生文化博物館
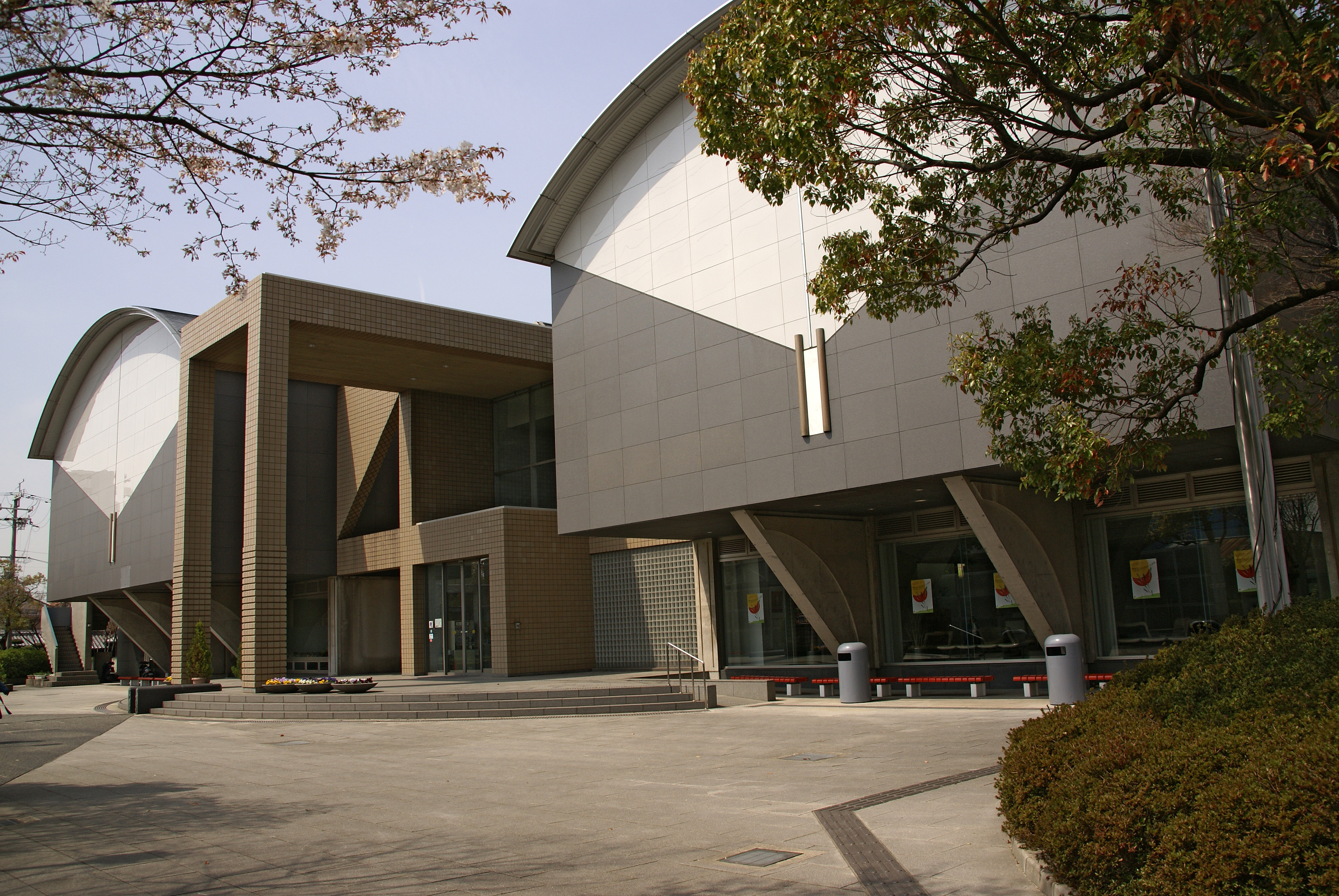
- Interactive map of the Osaka Prefectural Museum of Yayoi Culture area

General information
- Location: 4-8-27 Ikegami-chō, Izumi, Osaka Prefecture, Japan
- Coordinates: 34°29′57″N 135°25′38″E
- Opened: 1991

Website
- Official website (ja)

The Osaka Prefectural Museum of Yayoi Culture (大阪府立弥生文化博物館, Ōsaku Furitsu Yayoi Bunka Hakubutsukan) is an archaeology museum with a focus on the Yayoi period in Izumi, Osaka Prefecture, Japan. The museum opened in 1991 at the south end of the Ikegami-Sone Site. The permanent displays relate to Yayoi material and spiritual culture more generally as well as to the adjacent archaeological site.

== See also ==
- Kubosō Memorial Museum of Arts, Izumi
- Izumi Koganezuka Kofun
- Yayoi pottery
