= Izumi Koganezuka Kofun =

Kofun period keyhole-shaped burial mound in Japan

- 和泉黄金塚古墳 (Japanese)
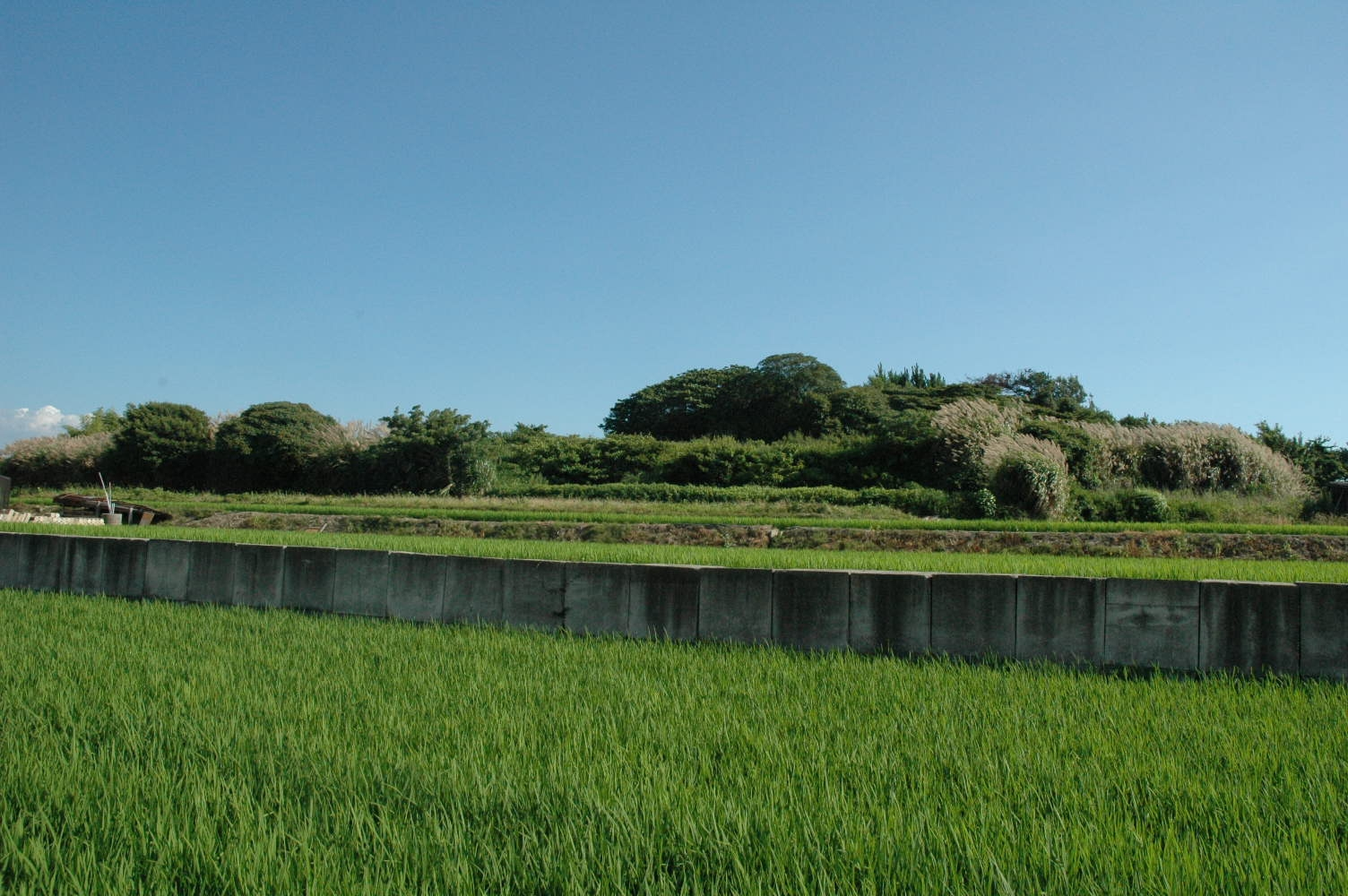
- Izumi Koganezuka Kofun

- Izumi Koganezuka Kofun Izumi Koganezuka Kofun (Japan)
- Interactive map of Izumi Koganezuka Kofun
- 34°25′42.95″N 135°21′19″E
- Type: Kofun
- Periods: Kofun period
- Location: Izumi, Osaka, Japan
- Region: Kansai region

History
- Built: c.4th century

Site notes
- Public access: Yes (no facilities)

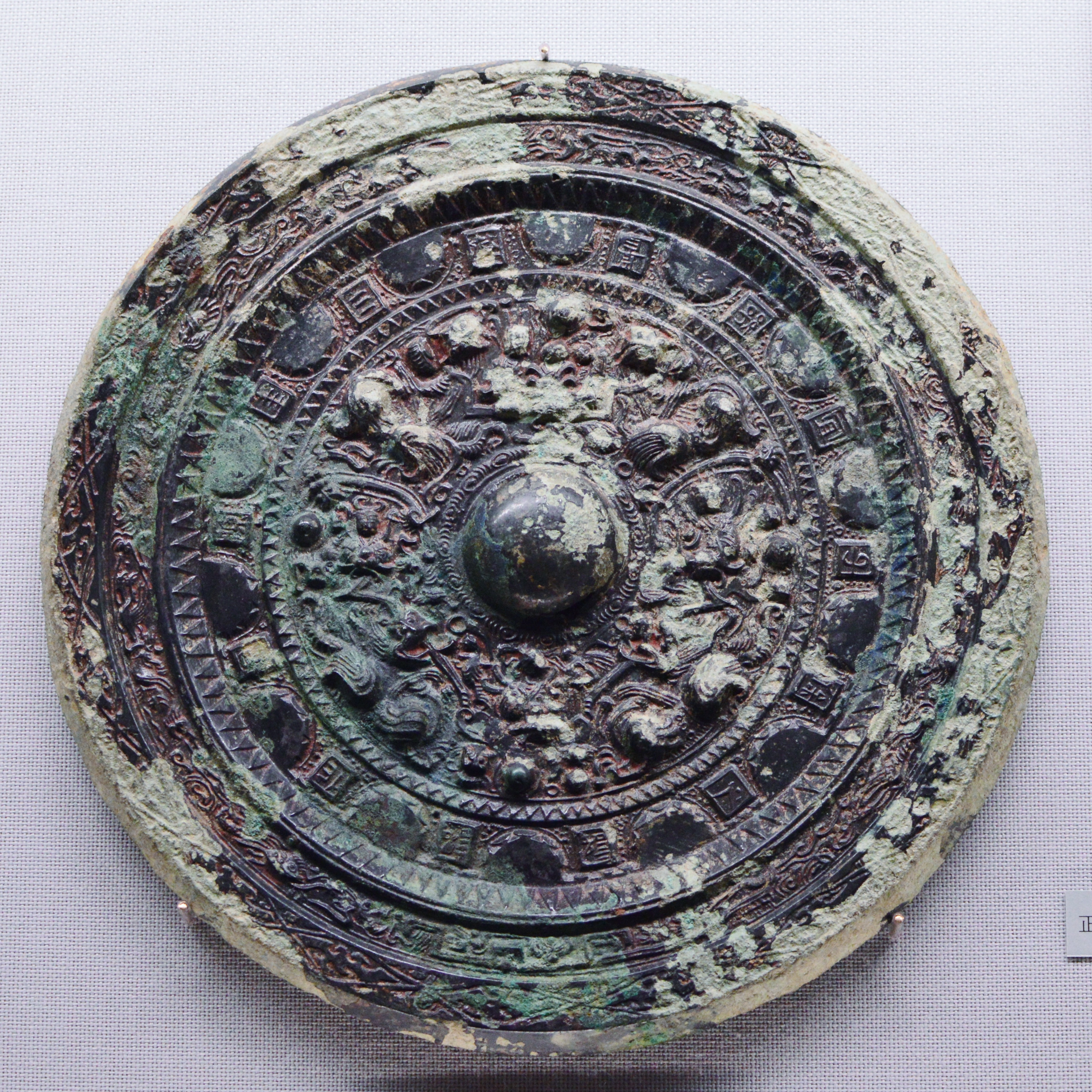
Shinju-kyo bronze mirror dated 238 AD from Izumi Koganezuka Kofun

Izumi Koganezuka Kofun (和泉黄金塚古墳) is a Kofun period keyhole-shaped burial mound, located in the Uedai neighborhood of the city of Izumi, Osaka in the Kansai region of Japan. The tumulus was designated a National Historic Site of Japan in 2008. It is noted for the bronze mirrors found within. These and other artifacts excavated from the tumulus are collectively designated a National Important Cultural Property.

== Overview ==
The Izumi Koganezuka Kofun is a zenpō-kōen-fun (前方後円墳), which is shaped like a keyhole, having one square end and one circular end, when viewed from above. It is located at the northwestern end of Shintayama hill, surrounded paddy fields, but the location is also close to the ancient provincial capital of former Izumi Province. The tumulus has a total length of about 94 meters. The presence of a kofun at this location has been known since antiquity, but in November 1945, a 17-year-old student noticed that the tumulus was severely damaged and convinced local authorities that a rescue archaeology excavation be performed. At that time, a leather-lacquered shield with copper decorations, iron swords and other metal artifacts were discovered. In 1950 to 1951, further excavation of the posterior circular portion by the Osaka Prefectural Board of Education and the Japanese Archaeological Association found the burial chamber within which three clay-covered wooden caskets were found side by side. The central casket had the remains of a woman, and she was flanked on either side with the remains of two men. Within and surrounding these coffins were a large quantity of grave goods, including Shinju-kyo mirrors, magatama beads and other jewelry, fragments of armor and a helm, iron swords, spears and other weapons, and other artifacts. The inscription of one of the mirror gave the reign date of Keisho 3, which corresponds to 238 AD. This drew great attention by historians, as per the Chinese chronicle Wei zhi (魏志 "Records of Wei"), which is part of the Records of the Three Kingdoms (三國志), in the year 239 AD Emperor Cao Rui sent "one hundred bronze mirrors" to Queen Himiko of Wa, and it was possible that this was one of these mirrors. These excavated items are now are in the possession of the Tokyo National Museum.

Further excavation were conducted from 2001 to 2005 by the Izumi City Board of Education which confirmed the scale of the tumulus, and recovered many cylindrical and figurative haniwa. From the haniwa and other artifacts, is thought that the tumulus was completed in the latter half of the 4th century.

The tumulus is about 20 minutes on foot from Tonoki Station on the JR West Hanwa Line.

Total length
94 meters:
Anterior rectangular portion
42 meters wide x 6.5 meters high, 2-tier
Posterior circular portion
57 meter diameter x 9 meters high, 2-tiers

== See also ==
- List of Historic Sites of Japan (Osaka)
