= Takaishi, Osaka =

Takaishi 高石市
- City
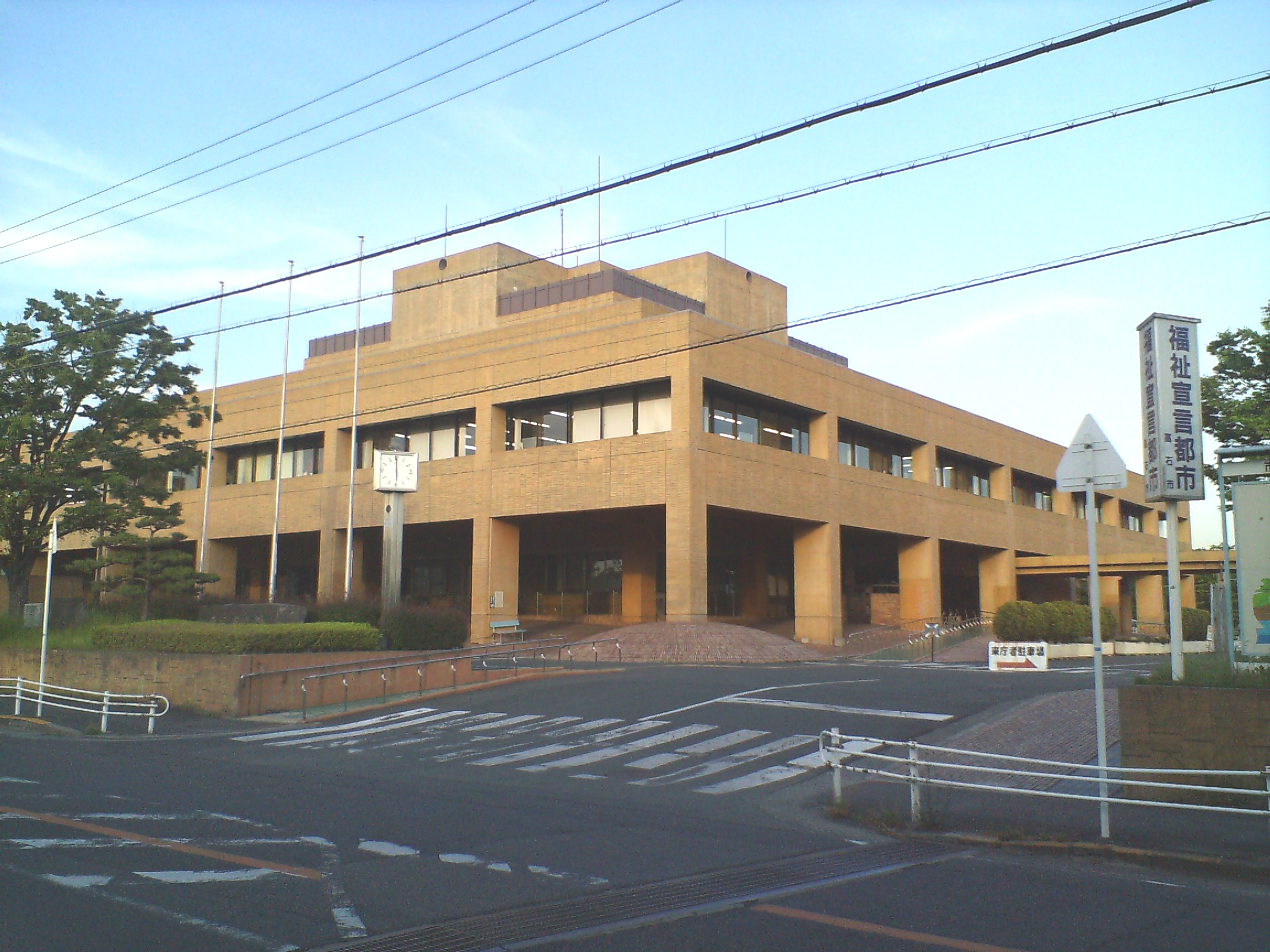
- Takaishi City Hall

- Flag chapter

- Location of Takaishi in Osaka Prefecture

- Location in Japan
- Coordinates: 34°31′N 135°27′E
- Country: Japan
- Region: Kansai
- Prefecture: Osaka

Area
  - Total: 11.30 km^{2} (4.36 sq mi)

Population (1 December 2021)
  - Total: 55,232
  - Density: 4,888/km^{2} (12,660/sq mi)
- Time zone: UTC+09:00 (JST)
- City hall address: 4-1-1 Kamo, Takaishi-shi, Osaka-fu 592-8585
- Website: Official website
- Symbols
- Flower: Chrysanthemum
- Tree: Pine

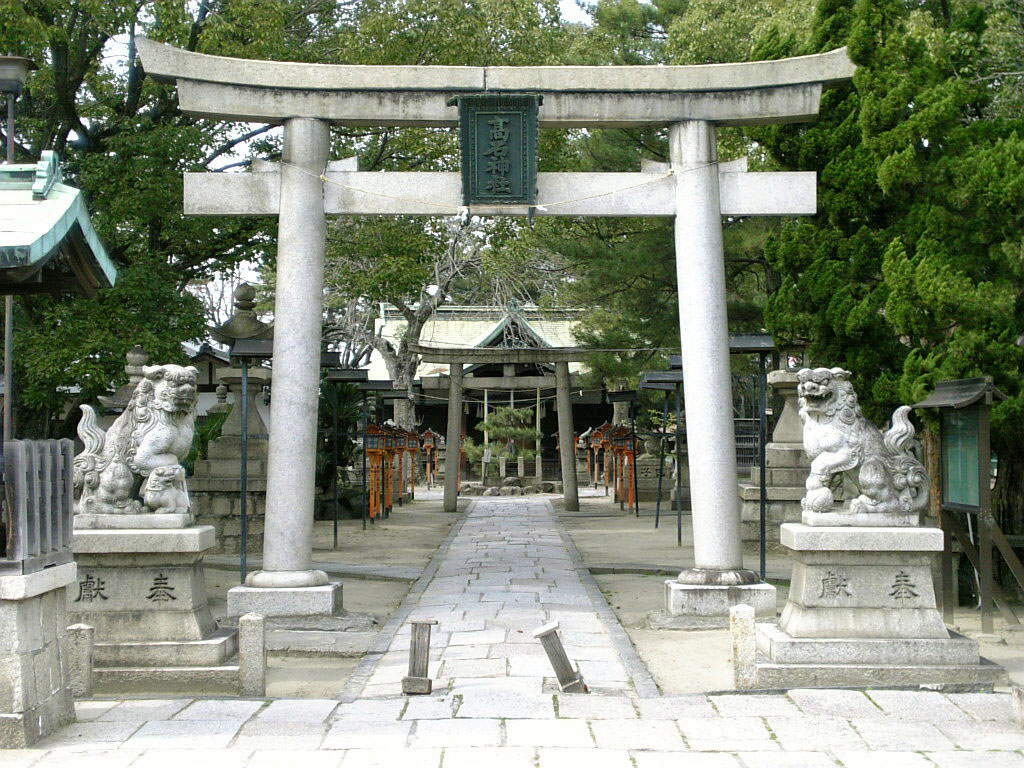
Takaishi Shrine

Takaishi (高石市, Takaishi-shi) is a city located in Osaka Prefecture, Japan. As of 1 December 2021, the city had an estimated population of 55,232 and a population density of 4,888 persons per km^{2}. The total area of the city is 11.30 square kilometres (4.36 sq mi).

== Geography ==
Takaishi is located in the south-central part of Osaka Prefecture, bordered by Osaka Bay to the west, Sakai City ( Nishi Ward ) to the northeast, and Izumi City and Izumiotsu City to the south. Almost the entire city area is flat and is completely urbanized. Roughly 6.1 kilometers east–west by 4.1 kilometers north–south, it is the second smallest city in terms of area in Osaka prefecture after Fujiidera. The western half of the city is reclaimed land and is part of the Sakai Senboku Seaside Industrial Zone.

It is traversed by both the Ashida and Oji Rivers.

=== Neighboring municipalities ===
Osaka Prefecture

- Izumi
- Izumiōtsu
- Sakai

== Climate ==
Takaishi has a humid subtropical climate (Köppen Cfa) characterized by warm summers and cool winters with light to no snowfall. The average annual temperature in Takaishi is 14.7 °C. The average annual rainfall is 1475 mm with September as the wettest month. The temperatures are highest on average in August, at around 26.7 °C, and lowest in January, at around 3.4 °C.

== Demographics ==
Per Japanese census data, the population of Takaishi almost doubled in the 1960s and peaked in the 1980s, and has been declining since.

Historical population
Year	Pop.	±%
1920	8,433	—
1930	13,074	+55.0%
1940	18,886	+44.5%
1950	24,557	+30.0%
1960	34,104	+38.9%
1970	61,442	+80.2%
1980	66,815	+8.7%
1990	65,086	−2.6%
2000	62,260	−4.3%
2010	59,523	−4.4%

== History ==
The area of the modern city of Takaishi was within ancient Izumi Province, and the place name "Takaishi" appears in the Nara period Nihon Shoki and other ancient works. During the Edo Period, the area was largely under the control of Kishiwada Domain. The village of Takaishi was established within Ōtori District, Osaka, with the creation of the modern municipalities system on 1 April 1889. On 1 April 1896, the area became part of Senboku District, Osaka. During the Russo-Japanese War, a large Prisoner-of-war camp was constructed on the coast of Takaishi, with an area of 430,000 square meters and a capacity to house 28,000 prisoners. The area is now a residential area. Takaishi was promoted to town status on 1 January 1915. The neighboring village of Toriishi was annexed on 1 April 1953. Takaishi was promoted to city status on 1 November 1966. The city experienced a severe financial crisis in the late 1990s and the mayor at that time attempted to merge the city with Sakai. However, the merger became the major campaign issue in the following mayoral election, and was voted down in 2003 when the incumbent mayor lost in his bid for re-election.

== Government ==
Takaishi has a mayor-council form of government with a directly elected mayor and a unicameral city council of 16 members. Takaishi collectively with the city of Izumiōtsu and the town of Tadaoka contributes two members to the Osaka Prefectural Assembly. In terms of national politics, the city is part of Osaka 18th district of the lower house of the Diet of Japan.

== Economy ==
Takaishi is located in the Sakai Senboku Seaside Industrial Zone, with half the city area on reclaimed land on the coast of Osaka Bay. The economy is dominated by heavy industry, notably petroleum refineries, petrochemical and chemical plants.

== Education ==
Takaishi has seven public elementary schools and three public middle schools operated by the city government and one public high school operated by the Osaka Prefectural Department of Education. The city also has two private middle schools and two private high schools. A private university, the Hagoromo International University is also located in Takaishi.

== Transportation ==
=== Railway ===
JR West – Hanwa Line

- Tonoki
- Higashi-Hagoromo

Nankai Electric Railway - Nankai Main Line

- Hagoromo - Takaishi

Nankai Electric Railway - Nankai Takashinohama Line

- Hagoromo - Kyarabashi - Takashinohama

=== Highway ===
- Bayshore Route
- National Route 26

== Sister cities ==
- Lomita, California, United States, since October 1981

== Local attractions ==
- Hamadera Park
- Honmichi headquarters
- Takaishi Danjiri Matsuri
- Takaishi Shrine
