= Mitsuo Tateishi =

Japanese baseball player (born 1957)

Mitsuo Tateishi 立石 充男
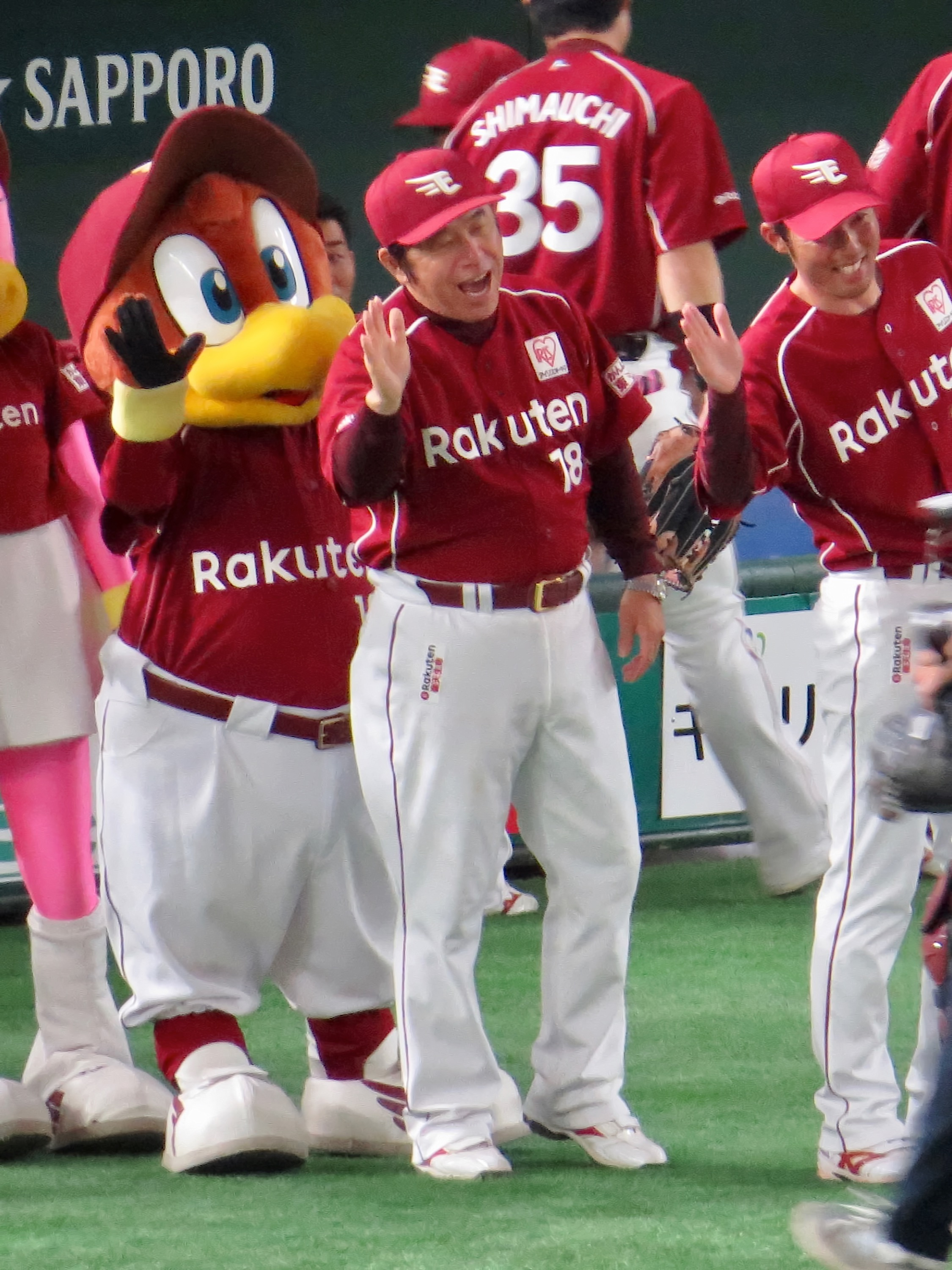
- Tateishi as a coach with the Rakuten Eagles
- Utility infielder/Coach
- Born: December 6, 1957 (age 68); Izumi, Osaka, Japan
- Batted: Right Threw: Right

NPB debut
- June 15, 1978, for the Nankai Hawks

Last NPB appearance
- 20 October, 1985, for the Nankai Hawks

NPB statistics (through 1985)
- Games Played: 267
- Batting average: .238
- Home runs: 11
- RBI: 49
- Stats at Baseball Reference

Teams
- As player: Nankai Hawks (1978–1985); As Coach: Nankai Hawks/Fukuoka Daiei Hawks(1987–1992); Chunichi Dragons (1993–1997); Koos Group Whales (1998–1999); Osaka Kintetsu Buffaloes (2000–2004); Hanshin Tigers (2005–2012); Uni-President 7-Eleven Lions (2014); Hanwha Eagles (2015); Tohoku Rakuten Golden Eagles (2016–2018); Chunichi Dragons (2019–2021)

Mitsuo Tateishi (立石 充男, Tateishi Mitsuo; born June 12, 1957 in Izumi, Osaka, Japan) is a former Japanese baseball player. He was most recently the position player coach for the Chunichi Dragons in Japan's Nippon Professional Baseball.

== Career ==
As a professional, Tateishi was a utility player for the Nankai Hawks over a span of 7 years. Tateishi has since gone on to have extensive coaching experience across Japan and East Asia.

On 29 October 2018, Tateishi was announced to be joining the coaching team of newly appointed Chunichi Dragons manager, Tsuyoshi Yoda, taking up a post as roaming outfield coach.
