= Kita-Sukematsu Station =

Railway station in Izumiōtsu, Osaka Prefecture, Japan

Kita-Sukematsu Station 北助松駅
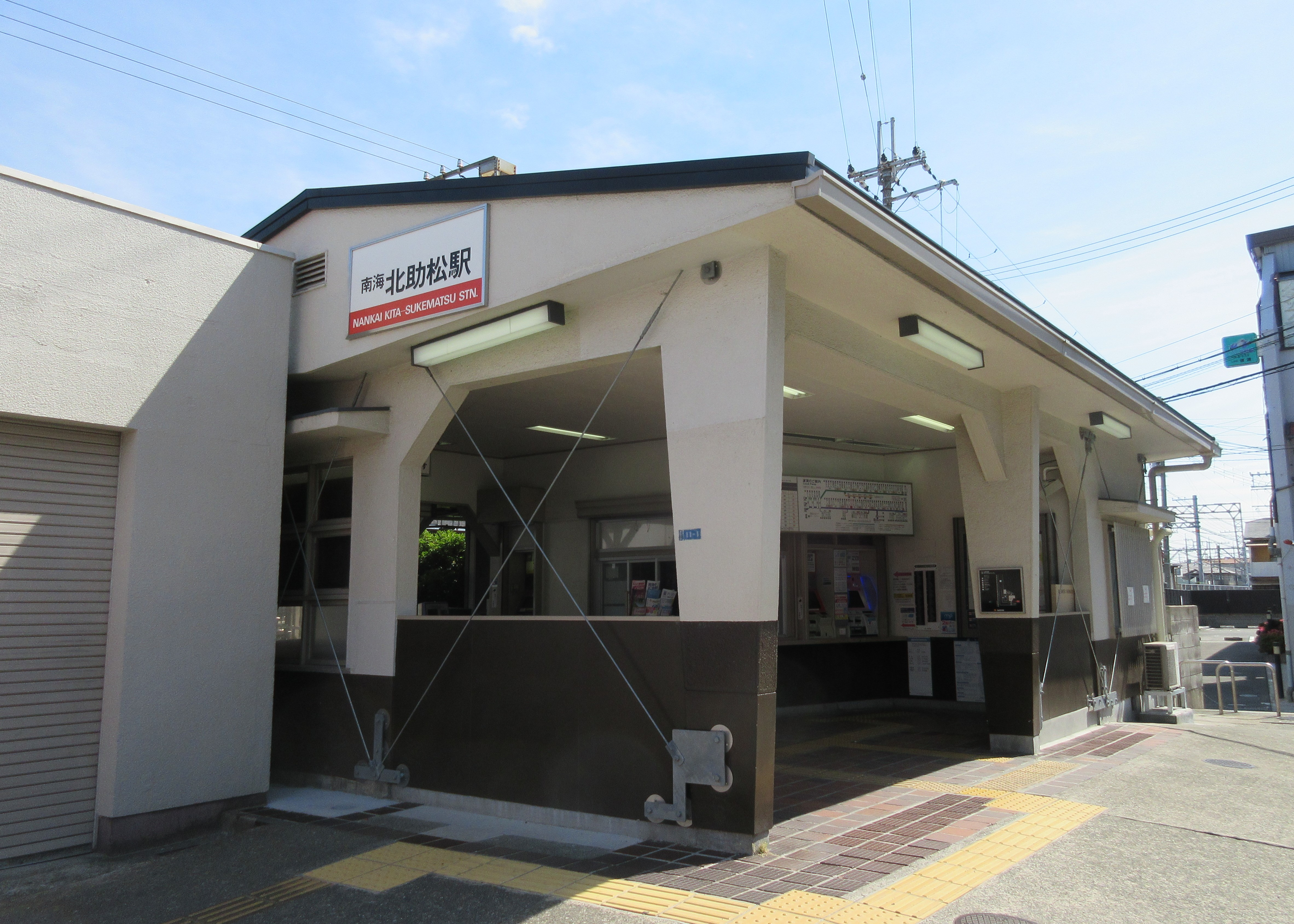
- Kita-Sukematsu Station building in July 2018

General information
- Location: 1-11-1 Higashi-Sukematsu-cho, Izumiōtsu-shi, Osaka-fu 595-0006; Japan
- Coordinates: 34°30′54″N 135°25′24″E
- Operator: Nankai Electric Railway
- Line: Nankai Main Line
- Distance: 18.5 km from Namba
- Platforms: 2 side platforms

Other information
- Station code: NK18
- Website: Official website

History
- Opened: 28 December 1957; 68 years ago

Passengers
- 2019: 12,574 daily
Location
- Location within Osaka Prefecture Location within Japan

Kita-Sukematsu Station (北助松駅, Kita-Sukematsu-eki) is a passenger railway station located in the city of Izumiōtsu, Osaka Prefecture, Japan, operated by the private railway operator Nankai Electric Railway. It has the station number "NK18".

== Lines ==
Kita-Sukematsu Station is served by the Nankai Main Line, and is 18.5 kilometers (11.5 mi) from the terminus of the line at Nanba.

== Layout ==
The station consists of two opposed side platforms. The platforms are independent of one another, and passengers wishing to change platforms must exit and re-enter the station.

=== Platforms ===
1	■ Nankai Main Line	for Wakayamashi and Kansai Airport
2	■ Nankai Main Line	for Namba

== Adjacent stations ==
«	Service	»
Nankai Main Line
Limited Express rapi:t α for Kansai Airport: Does not stop at this station
Limited Express rapi:t β: Does not stop at this station
Limited Express Southern: Does not stop at this station
Limited Express: Does not stop at this station
Express: Does not stop at this station
Airport Express: Does not stop at this station
Sub. Express: Does not stop at this station
Takaishi	Semi-Express for Namba (weekday mornings)	Matsunohama
Takaishi	Local	Matsunohama

== History ==
Kita-Sukematsu Station opened on 28 December 1957.

== Passenger statistics ==
In fiscal 2019, the station was used by an average of 12,574 passengers daily.

== Surrounding area ==
- Kitasukematsu Shopping Street
- Sukematsu Shrine
- Sukematsu housing complex
- Osaka Prefectural Takaishi High School
- Osaka Prefectural Shinoda High School

== See also ==
- List of railway stations in Japan
