= Takaishi Station =

Railway station in Takaishi, Osaka Prefecture, Japan

Takaishi Station 高石駅
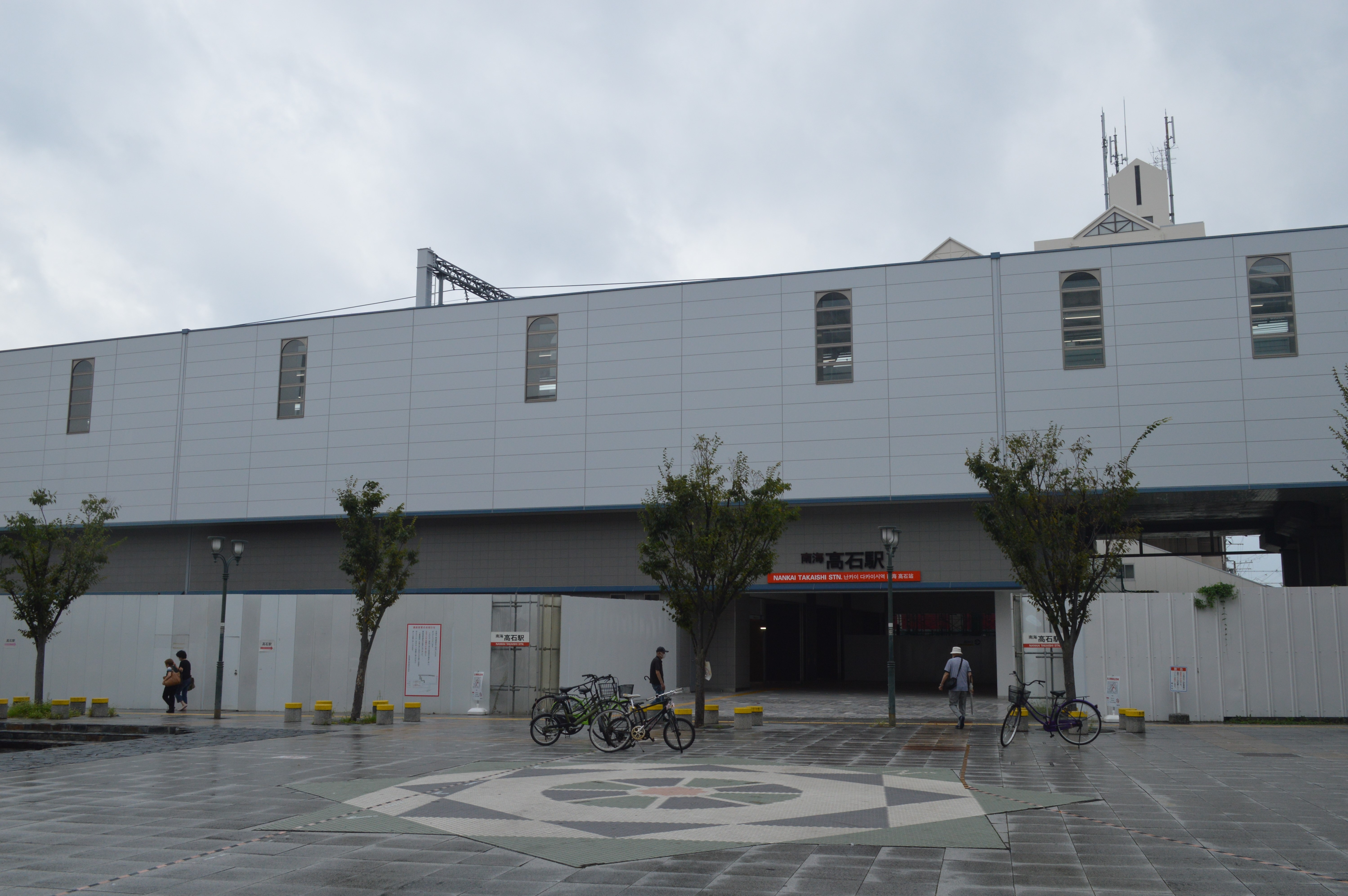
- Takaishi Station east entrance, September 2021

General information
- Location: 10-18, Chiyoda 1-chome, Takaishi-shi, Osaka-fu 592-0014; Japan
- Coordinates: 34°31′18″N 135°25′59″E
- Operator: Nankai Electric Railway
- Line: Nankai Main Line
- Distance: 17.3 km from Namba
- Platforms: 1 island platform

Construction
- Structure type: Elevated

Other information
- Station code: NK17
- Website: Official website

History
- Opened: March 1901; 125 years ago
- Former names: Kuzunoha (1901–1941); Takaishi-chō (1941–1966)

Passengers
- 2019: 10,184 daily
Location
- Location within Osaka Prefecture Location within Japan

Takaishi Station (高石駅, Takaishi-eki) is a passenger railway station located in the city of Takaishi, Osaka Prefecture, Japan, operated by the private railway operator Nankai Electric Railway. It has the station number "NK17".

== Lines ==
Takaishi Station is served by the Nankai Main Line, and is 17.3 kilometers (10.7 mi) from the terminus of the line at Nanba.

== Layout ==
The station consists of one elevated island platform with the station building underneath.

=== Platforms ===
| 1 | ■ Nankai Main Line | for Wakayamashi and Kansai Airport |
| 2 | ■ Nankai Main Line | for Namba |

== Adjacent stations ==
| « | Service | » |
Nankai Main Line
Limited Express "rapi:t α" for Kansai Airport (特急ラピートα): Does not stop at this station
Limited Express "rapi:t β" (特急ラピートβ): Does not stop at this station
Limited Express "Southern" (特急サザン): Does not stop at this station
Limited Express without seat reservations (自由席特急): Does not stop at this station
Express (急行): Does not stop at this station
Airport Express (空港急行): Does not stop at this station
Sub. Express (区間急行): Does not stop at this station
| Hagoromo | Semi-Express for Namba (準急, in the morning on weekdays) | Kita-Sukematsu |
| Hagoromo | Local (普通車) | Kita-Sukematsu |

== History ==
Takaishi Station opened on 13 April 1901 as Kuzunoha Station (葛葉駅). It was renamed Takaishicho Station (高石町駅) on 1 August 1941 and to its present name on 1 December 1966. The station was elevated in two stages, with the new outbound platform opened on 14 May 2016 and the new inbound platform on 22 May 2021.

== Passenger statistics ==
In fiscal 2019, the station was used by an average of 10,184 passengers daily.

== Surrounding area ==
- Seifu Nankai Junior and Senior High School
- Takaishi City Konan Junior High School
- Takaishi City Takaishi Elementary School

== See also ==
- List of railway stations in Japan

== Around the station ==
=== Public/Commercial facilities ===
Appla Takaishi is on the east side of the station. The northwest and southeast also have their own shopping streets. There is also a station plaza.

==== Appla Takaishi ====
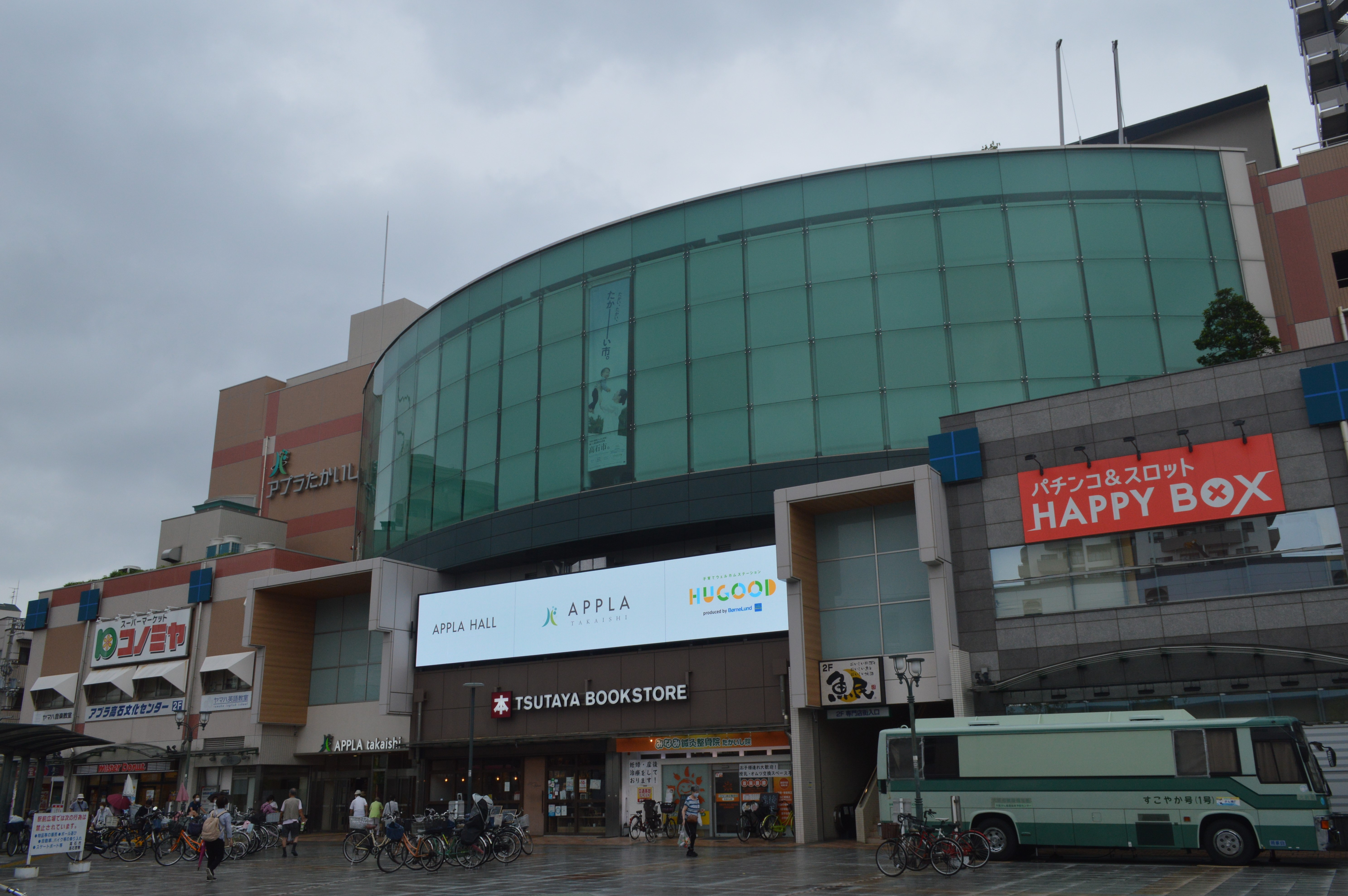
Appla Takaishi

A commercial complex on the east side of the station. The main tenants are as follows.

- Takaishi Shimin Bunkakaikan (Appla Hall)
- TSUTAYA BOOKSTORE Appla Takaishi
- Takaishi City Library
- Super Konomiya Takaishi store
- Seria Appla Takaishi store
- Hagoromo Garden
- cook deli GOZEN
- vegemaru
- hanna natrient

==== Other public/commercial facilities ====
- Life Takaishi
- Kansai Super
  - DAISO
- Sundi

=== Schools ===
- Seifunankai Junior & Senior High School
- Kounan Junior High School
- Takaishi Elementary School
- Kamo Elementary School
