= Kyarabashi Station =

Railway station in Takaishi, Osaka Prefecture, Japan

Kyarabashi Station 伽羅橋駅
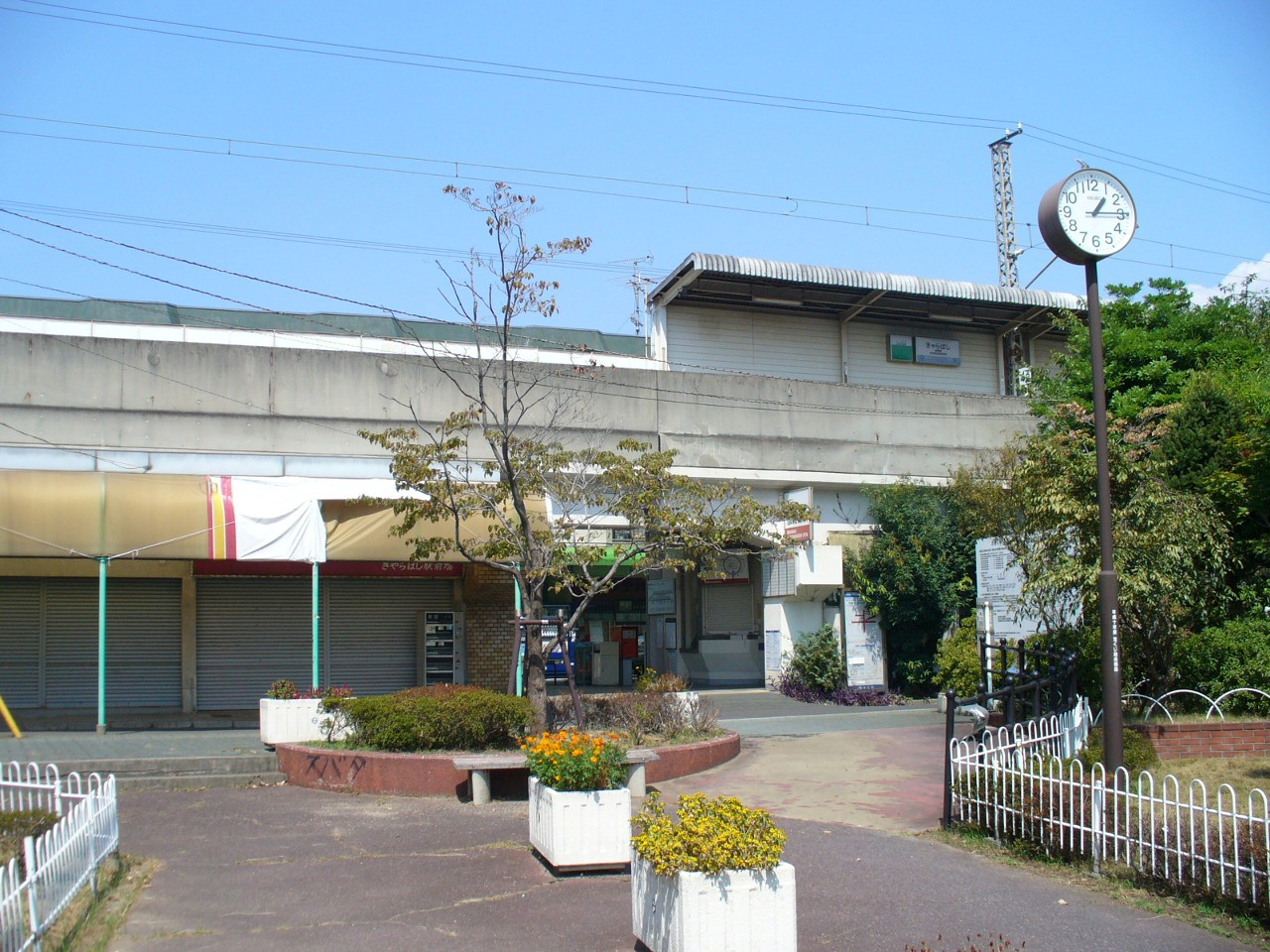
- Kyarabashi Station in August 2006

General information
- Location: 15-18, Hagoromo 5-chome, Takaishi-shi, Osaka-fu 592-0002; Japan
- Coordinates: 34°31′44″N 135°26′12″E
- Operator: Nankai Electric Railway
- Line: Takashinohama Line
- Distance: 0.9 km from Hagoromo
- Platforms: 2 side platforms

Construction
- Structure type: Elevated

Other information
- Station code: NK16-1
- Website: Official website

History
- Opened: October 2, 1918

Passengers
- 2019: 1539 daily

Services
Preceding station	Nankai Electric Railway	Following station
Hagoromo Terminus	Takashinohama Line	Takashinohama Terminus
Location
- Location within Osaka Prefecture Location within Japan

Kyarabashi Station (伽羅橋駅, Kyarabashi-eki) is a passenger railway station located in the city of Takaishi, Osaka Prefecture, Japan, operated by the private railway operator Nankai Electric Railway. It has the station number "NK16-1".

== Lines ==
Kyarabashi Station is served by the Takashinohama Line, and is 0.9 kilometers from the terminus of the line at Hagoromo.

== Layout ==
The station consists of two opposed unnumbered elevated side platforms with the station building underneath.

=== Platforms ===
North	■ Nankai Main Line	for Hagoromo
South	■ Nankai Main Line	for Takashinohama

== History ==
Kyarabashi Station opened on 2 October 1918. Operations were suspended from 22 May 2021, due to construction work, and was expected to resume in 2024.

Services resumed on 6 April 2024.

== Passenger statistics ==
In fiscal 2019, the station was used by an average of 1539 passengers daily.

== Surrounding area ==
- Hamadera Park
- Takaishi Shrine

== See also ==
- List of railway stations in Japan
