= Hagoromo Station =

Railway station in Takaishi, Osaka Prefecture, Japan

Hagoromo Station 羽衣駅
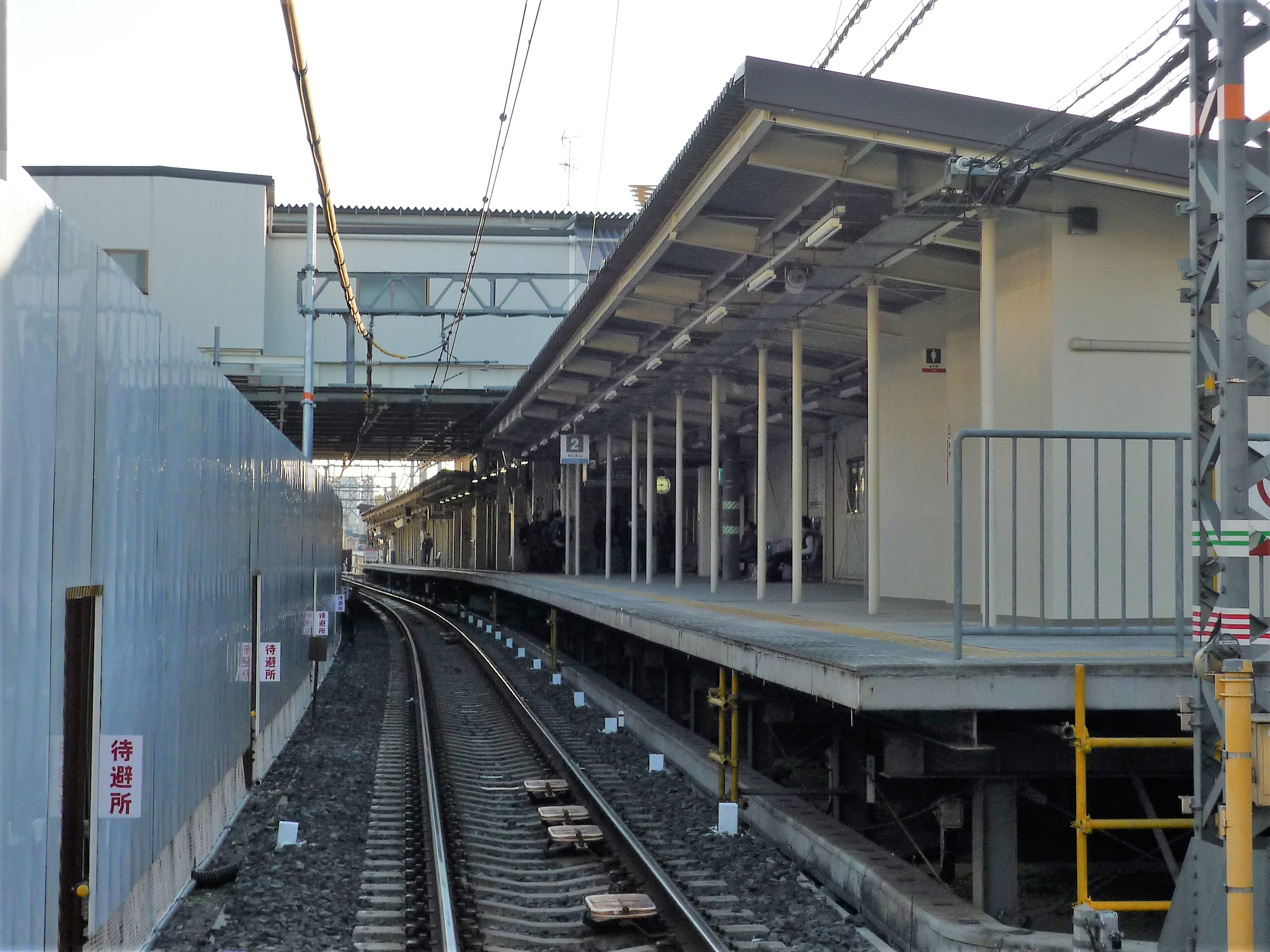
- Hagoromo Station platform 2 in December 2016

General information
- Location: 15-16, Hagoromo 1-chome, Takaishi-shi, Osaka-fu 592-0003; Japan
- Coordinates: 34°32′04″N 135°26′31″E
- Operator: Nankai Electric Railway
- Lines: Nankai Main Line; Takashinohama Line
- Distance: 15.6 km from Namba
- Platforms: 1 island platform, 1 side platform

Other information
- Station code: NK16
- Website: Official website

History
- Opened: 1 May 1912; 114 years ago

Passengers
- 2019: 22,112 daily

Services
| Preceding station | Nankai Electric Railway | Following station |
|---|---|---|
| Hamaderakōen NK15 towards Namba | Nankai Main Line Local | Takaishi NK17 towards Wakayamashi |
| Hamaderakōen NK15 towards Namba | Nankai Main Line Semi-Express (weekday mornings) | Takaishi NK17 One-way operation |
| Sakai NK11 towards Namba | Nankai Main Line Sub. Express Express | Izumiōtsu NK20 towards Wakayamashi |
| Sakai NK11 towards Namba | Nankai Main Line Airport Express | Izumiōtsu NK20 towards Kansai Airport |
| Terminus | Takashinohama Line | Kyarabashi NK16-1 towards Takashinohama |
Location
- Location within Osaka Prefecture Location within Japan

Hagoromo Station (羽衣駅, Hagoromo-eki) is an interchange passenger railway station located in the city of Takaishi, Osaka Prefecture, Japan, operated by the private railway operator Nankai Electric Railway. It has the station number "NK16".

== Lines ==
Hagoromo Station is served by the Nankai Main Line, and is 15.6 kilometers (9.7 mi) from the terminus of the line at Nanba. It is also the terminus of the 1.4 kilometer Takashinohama Line to Takashinohama, which has been temporarily been replaced by a bus service until 2024 our to construction work.

== Layout ==
The station consists of one elevated island platform and one side platform with the station building underneath.

=== Platforms ===
| 1 | ■ Nankai Main Line | for Wakayamashi and Kansai Airport |
| 2 | ■ Nankai Main Line | for Namba |
| 3 | ■ Takashinohama Line | for Takashinohama |

== History ==
Hagoromo Station opened on 1 May 1912.

The station was elevated in stages: a temporary station opened on 20 May 2013, the new elevated outbound platform for the mainline opened on 14 May 2016, the inbound platform for the mainline followed on 22 May 2021, and the elevated station was completed with the opening of the Takashinohama Line platform on 6 April 2024.

== Passenger statistics ==
In fiscal 2019, the station was used by an average of 22,112 passengers daily.

== Surrounding area ==
- Hamadera Park
- Hagoromo University of International Studies
- Hagoromo Gakuen Junior and Senior High School
- Osaka Aviation College

== See also ==
- List of railway stations in Japan
