= Takashinohama Line =

Railway line in Osaka Prefecture, Japan

Nankai Takashinohama Line
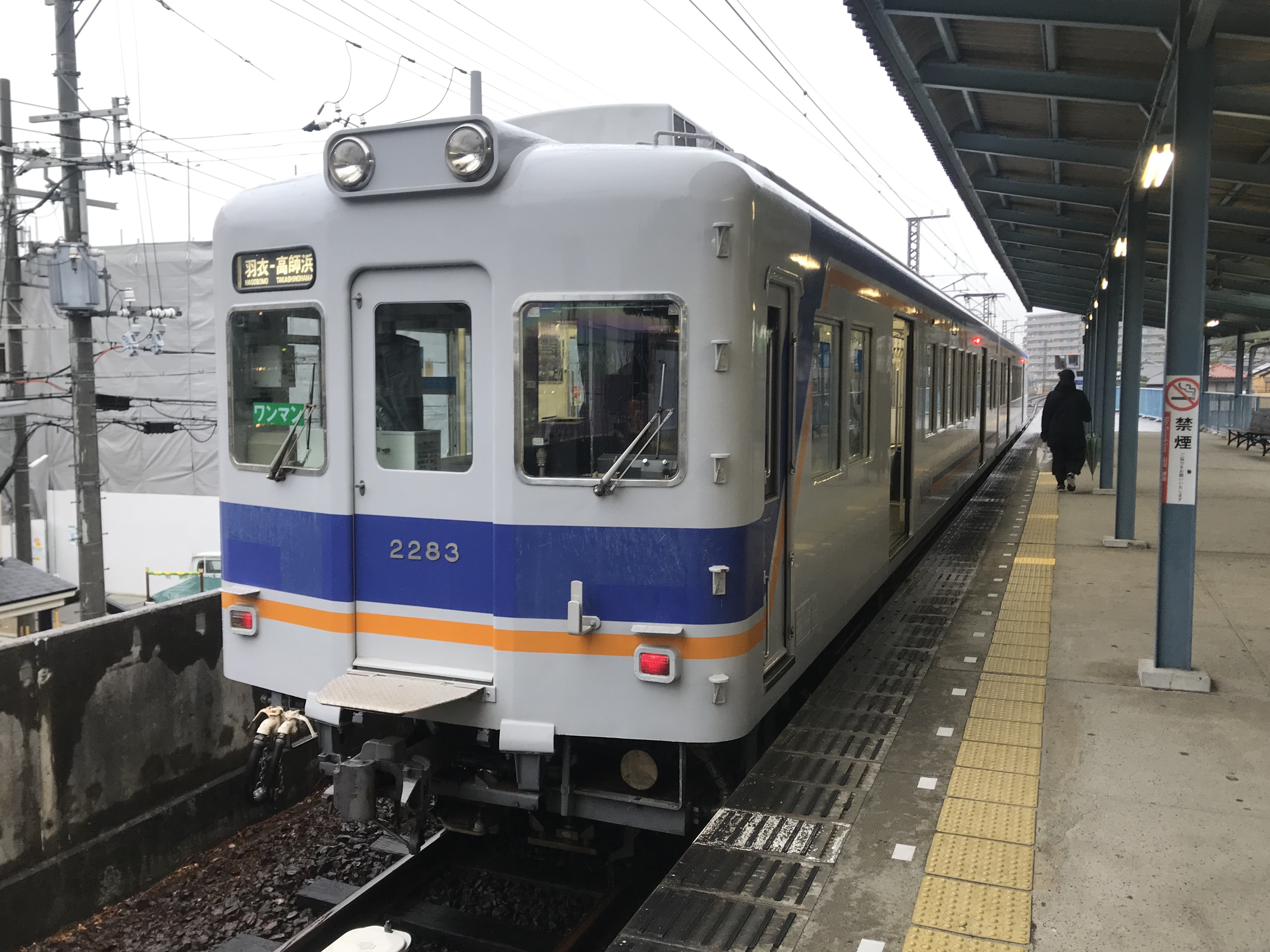
- Nankai 2200 series EMU

Overview
- Native name: 高篠浜線
- Locale: Osaka Prefecture
- Termini: Hagoromo; Takashinohama

Service
- Operator(s): Nankai Electric Railway Co., Ltd.

History
- Opened: October 12, 1918; 107 years ago
- Closed: 22 May 2021
- Reopened: 6 April 2024

Technical
- Line length: 1.5 km (0.93 mi)
- Number of tracks: Single
- Track gauge: 1,067 mm (3 ft 6 in)
- Electrification: 1,500 V DC, overhead lines
- Operating speed: 45 km/h (28 mph)

The Takashinohama Line (高師浜線, Takashinohama-sen) is a railway line in Osaka Prefecture, Japan, owned and operated by Nankai Electric Railway. This line connects to the Nankai Main Line.

== History ==
The line was opened in 1918 and 1919, electrified at 1500 VDC. The maximum speed of the line is 45 km/h (28 mph). From 22 May 2021, the service was suspended until 2024 due to the construction of the elevated Hagoromo Station, and bus transportation was carried out.

Services resumed on 6 April 2024.

== Stations ==
No.	Station	Distance (km)	Connecting Lines	Location
NK16	Hagoromo 羽衣	0.0	Nankai Main Line; JR West Hanwa Line (Higashi-Hagoromo)	Takaishi, Osaka
NK16-1	Kyarabashi 伽羅橋	1.0		Takaishi, Osaka
NK16-2	Takashinohama 高師浜	1.5		Takaishi, Osaka
