= Takashinohama Station =

Railway station in Takaishi, Osaka Prefecture, Japan

Takashinohama Station 高師浜駅
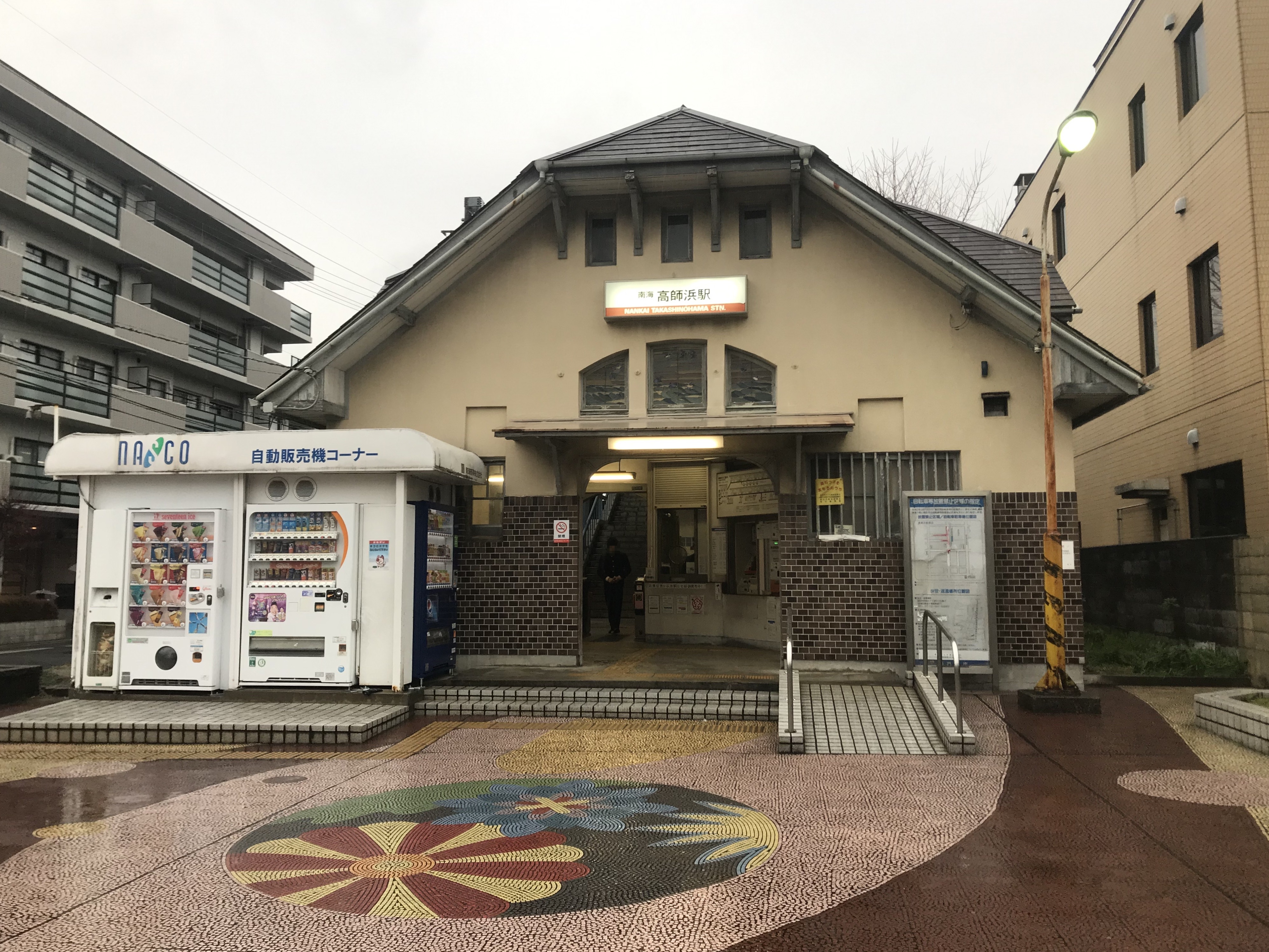
- Takashinohama Station in January 2019

General information
- Location: 1-37, Takashinohama 4-chome, Takaishi-shi, Osaka-fu 592-0004; Japan
- Coordinates: 34°31′38″N 135°25′54″E
- Operator: Nankai Electric Railway
- Line: Takashinohama Line
- Distance: 1.4 km from Hagoromo
- Platforms: 1 side platform

Construction
- Structure type: Elevated

Other information
- Station code: NK16-2
- Website: Official website

History
- Opened: 25 October 1919

Passengers
- 2019: 1699 daily

Services
Preceding station	Nankai Electric Railway	Following station
Kyarabashi towards Hagoromo	Takashinohama Line	Terminus
Location
- Location within Osaka Prefecture Location within Japan

Takashinohama Station (高師浜駅, Takashinohama-eki) is a passenger railway station located in the city of Takaishi, Osaka Prefecture, Japan, operated by the private railway operator Nankai Electric Railway. It has the station number "NK16-2".

== Lines ==
Takashinohama Station is a terminus the Takashinohama Line, and is 1.4 kilometers from the opposing terminus of the line at Hagoromo.

== Layout ==
The station consists of a single dead-headed elevated side platform with the station building underneath.

== History ==
Takashinohama Station opened on 25 October 1919. Operations were suspended from 22 May 2021 due to construction work, and was expected to resume in 2024.

Services resumed on 6 April 2024.

== Passenger statistics ==
In fiscal 2019, the station was used by an average of 1699 passengers daily.

== Surrounding area ==
- Osaka Rinkai Sports Center
- Takaishi fishing port
- Takaishi Marina

== See also ==
- List of railway stations in Japan
