= Kōki Aoyagi =

Japanese baseball player

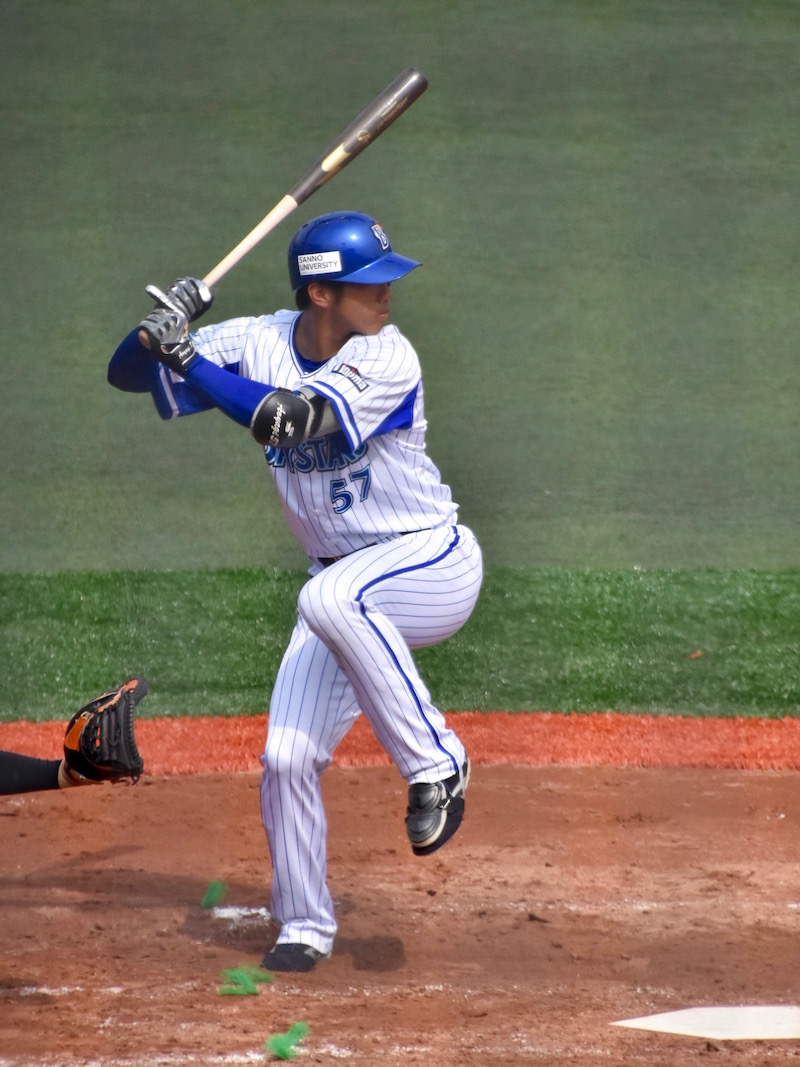
- Aoyagi with the Yokohama DeNA BayStars
- Outfielder
- Born: May 19, 1997 (age 29); Izumiōtsu, Osaka, Japan
- Bats: Right Throws: Right

Teams
- Yokohama DeNA BayStars (2016–2019)

Kōki Aoyagi (青柳 昴樹, Aoyagi Kōki; born May 19, 1997) is a professional Japanese baseball player. He was born in Izumiōtsu, Osaka, and plays outfielder for the Yokohama DeNA BayStars.

Aoyagi signed with the Canberra Cavalry of the Australian Baseball League for the 2018/19 season.
