= Matsunohama Station =

Railway station in Izumiōtsu, Osaka Prefecture, Japan

Matsunohama Station 松ノ浜駅
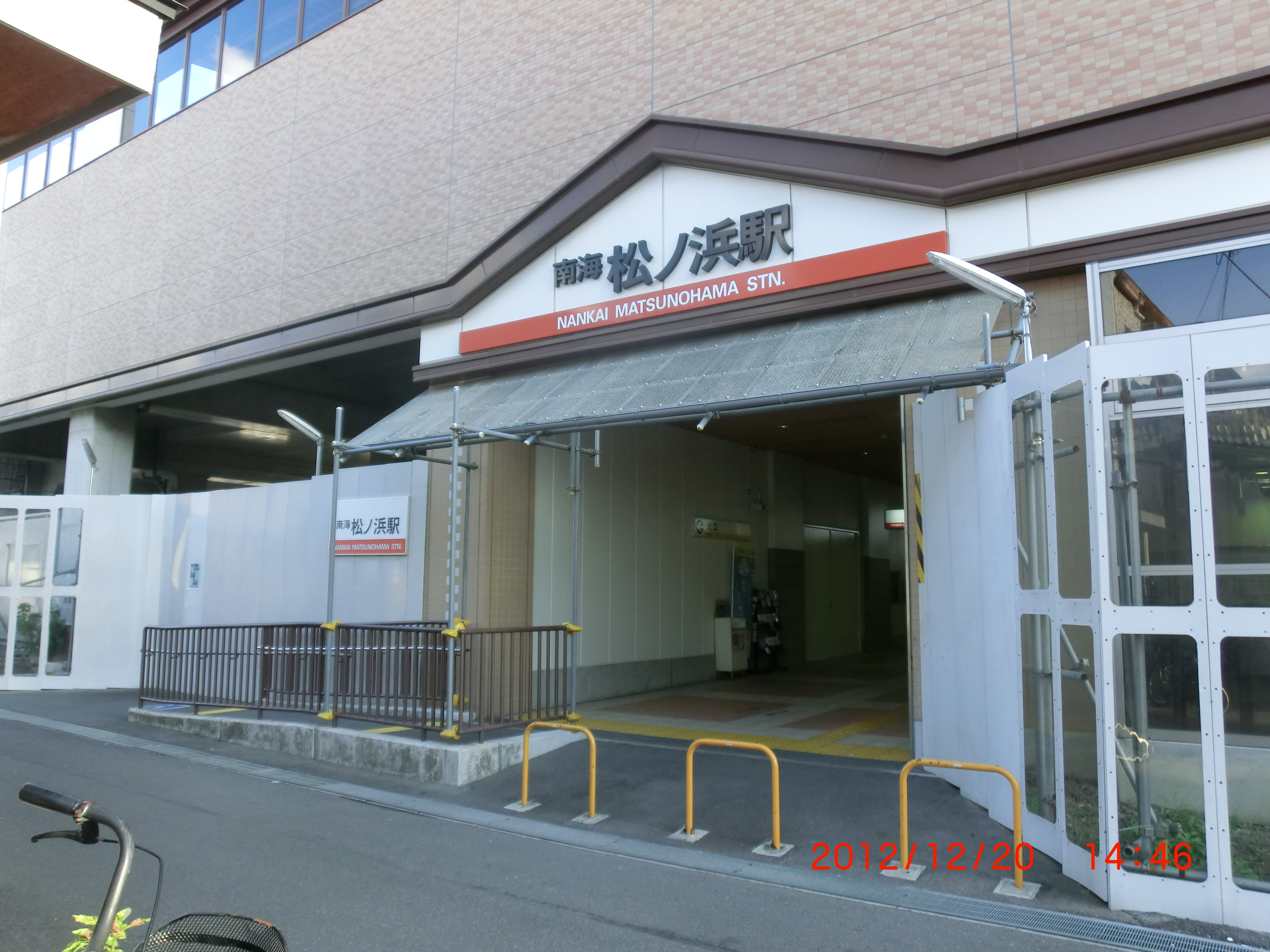
- Matsunohama Station, December 2012

General information
- Location: 1-1-15 Futsutachō, Izumiōtsu-shi, Osaka-fu 595-0015; Japan
- Coordinates: 34°30′33″N 135°24′55″E
- Operator: Nankai Electric Railway
- Line: Nankai Main Line
- Distance: 19.5 km from Namba
- Platforms: 2 side platforms

Construction
- Structure type: Elevated

Other information
- Station code: NK19
- Website: Official website

History
- Opened: 10 December 1914; 111 years ago
- Former names: Sukematsu (until 1960)

Passengers
- 2019: 3944 daily
Location
- Location within Osaka Prefecture Location within Japan

Matsunohama Station (松ノ浜駅, Matsunohama-eki) is a passenger railway station located in the city of Izumiōtsu, Osaka Prefecture, Japan, operated by the private railway operator Nankai Electric Railway. It has the station number "NK19".

== Lines ==
Matsunohama Station is served by the Nankai Main Line, and is 19.5 kilometers (12.1 mi) from the terminus of the line at Nanba.

== Layout ==
The station consists of two elevated opposed side platforms with the station building underneath.

=== Platforms ===
1	■ Nankai Main Line	for Wakayamashi and Kansai Airport
2	■ Nankai Main Line	for Namba

== Adjacent stations ==
«	Service	»
Nankai Main Line
Limited Express "rapi:t α" for Kansai Airport (特急ラピートα): Does not stop at this station
Limited Express "rapi:t β" (特急ラピートβ): Does not stop at this station
Limited Express "Southern" (特急サザン): Does not stop at this station
Limited Express without seat reservations (自由席特急): Does not stop at this station
Express (急行): Does not stop at this station
Airport Express (空港急行): Does not stop at this station
Sub. Express (区間急行): Does not stop at this station
Kita-Sukematsu	Semi-Express for Namba (準急, in the morning on weekdays)	Izumiōtsu
Kita-Sukematsu	Local (普通車)	Izumiōtsu

== History ==
Matsunohama Station opened on 10 December 1914 as Sukematsu Station (助松駅). It was renamed to its present name on 15 December 1960. On 22 February 2003, the station was replaced by a temporary station, which was used while a new elevated station was constructed, which opened on 7 June 2008. The station was lengthened to the south when the connecting tracks were also elevated, opening on 4 August 2012.

== Passenger statistics ==
In fiscal 2019, the station was used by an average of 3944 passengers daily.

== Surrounding area ==
- Osaka Prefectural Museum of Yayoi Culture

== See also ==
- List of railway stations in Japan
