= Ikegami-Sone Site =

Japanese archaeological site

Coordinates: 34°30′6.6″N 135°25′38.2″E

- 池上・曽根遺跡 (Japanese)
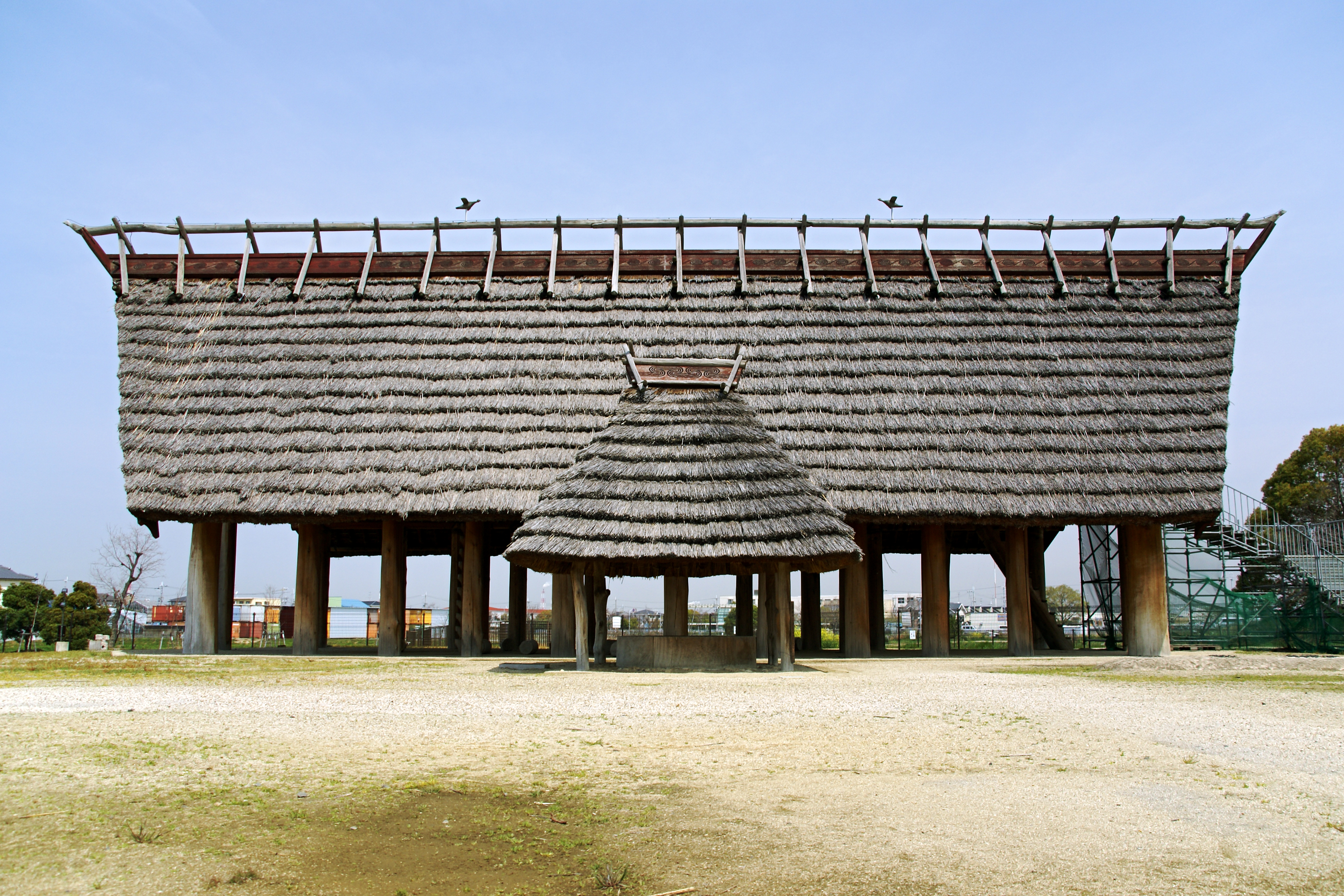
- Ikegami-Sone Site

- Ikegami-Sone Site Ikegami-Sone Site (Japan)
- Interactive map of Ikegami-Sone Site
- Type: settlement trace
- Periods: Yayoi period
- Location: Izumi - Izumiōtsu, Japan
- Region: Kansai region

Site notes
- Public access: Yes (park and museum)

The Ikegami-Sone site (池上・曽根遺跡, Ikegami-Sone iseki) is an archaeological site containing the ruins of a large-scale Yayoi period settlement straddling the Ikegami neighborhood in the city of Izumi and the Sone neighborhood in the city of Izumiōtsu in the Kansai region of Japan. It is a large settlement ruin with a total area of 600,000 m2, extending 1.5 kilometers north-to-south and 0.6 kilometers east-to-west. It was designated a National Historic Site of Japan in 1976 and has been maintained as an archaeological park since 2005.

== Overview ==
The Ikegami-Sone site was discovered around 1900 when a local resident started collecting shards of Yayoi pottery but initially received no academic attention. An archaeological excavation was conducted in preparation for the 1970 Osaka Expo when the route of Japan National Route 26 was planned, and it was discovered that the site was of unprecedented size. However, the discovery of the Yoshinogari site in Kyushu drew all attention, and the investigation at Ikegami-Sone did not proceed much further due to lack of funds. In the 1990s, a re-survey was conducted to improve the historic park, at which time the foundations of a large excavated pillar building were discovered. This was one of the largest Yayoi period structures yet discovered, and measured 19.2 by 6.9 meters. The cypress pillars had a diameter of 60-centimeters, and the roots of 17 of what appear to have originally been 26 pillars have survived. Dendrochronology proved that the pillars used in the construction of this building were cut in 52 BC. The post holes had been reused three or four times, indicating that the building had been reconstructed at least that many times over a 100-year period. The purpose of this building is unknown, but it is believed to have been the center of the settlement, either as a ritual space or the residence of the chief. Next to the large building was remains of a large camphor tree with a diameter of 2.3 meters, which was hollowed out to form the sides of a well, along with the foundations of several other excavated pillar buildings. A vary large number of pit dwellings existed to the south, and a paddy field with an area of about 250,000 square meters was located to the west of these structures. The entire settlement was encircled by a double ring of moats with a width of three to four meters. On the outer circumference of the moat, a group of twenty square girder tombs surrounds the southern, eastern, and northern areas of the settlement in a band shape.

Many excavated items including Yayoi pottery, stone tools, and bird-shaped wooden products that are thought to be religious relics have been discovered. Of note were a large number of stone knives made from a green schist from the Kinokawa River basin in Wakayama Prefecture. These included 1300 finished examples and 300 unfinished products. Other weapons, such stone swords and stone spearheads have also been found. For this reasons, the Ikegami-Sone Site is thought to have been a production and distribution center for stone knives. Ironware was not excavated at the Ikegami-Sone site, and it is thought that the spread of iron working in the region during the Yayoi period was later when compared with contemporary sites in northern Kyushu.

Also of note was a long-necked jar depicting a dragon, which seems to be from the late Yayoi period. Such pottery is thought to be related to water rituals because it has been excavated at other sites from wells. The dragon is considered to be a rain-making god in China, and the jar hints at some form of contact with continental culture during this period. Many of the artifacts found are preserved and displayed at the adjacent Osaka Prefectural Museum of Yayoi Culture (大阪府立弥生文化博物館, Ōsaka Furitsu Yayoi Bunka Hakubutsukan), and much of the site is preserved as an archaeological park with many reconstructions of buildings. The site is a seven-minute walk from Shinodayama Station on the JR West Hanwa Line.

== Gallery ==
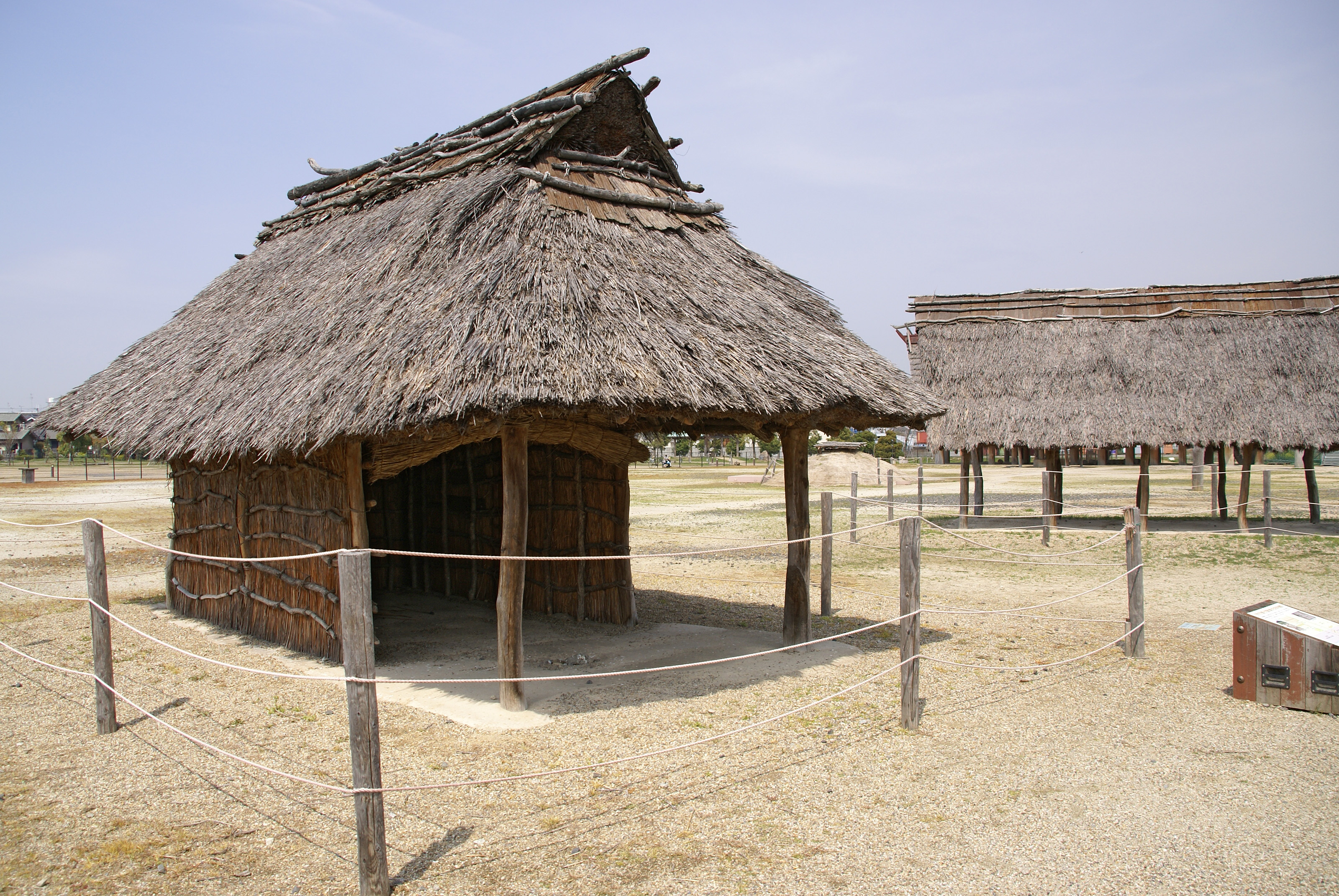
Reconstructed building at Ikegami-Sone site

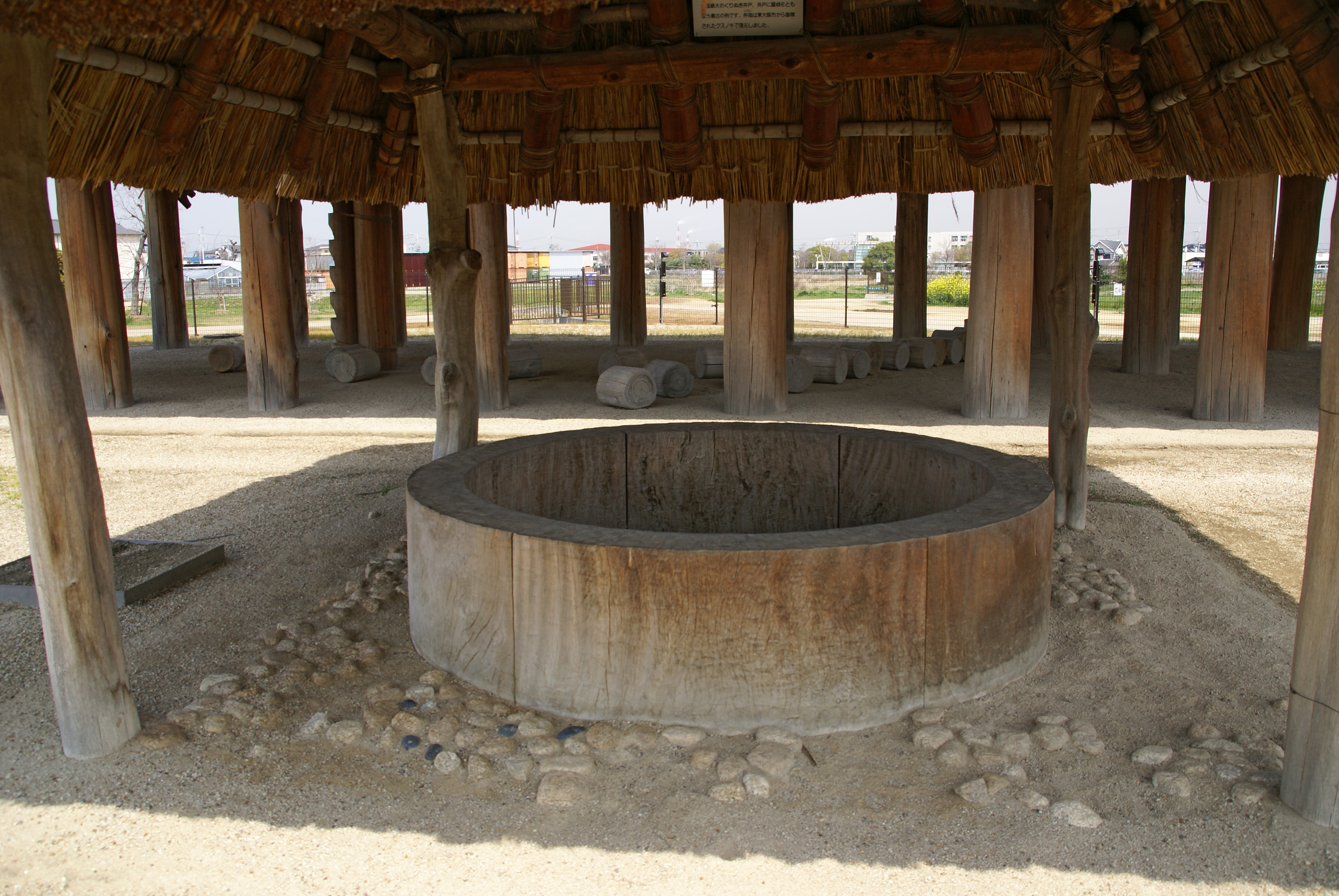
Reconstructed well at Ikegami-Sone site

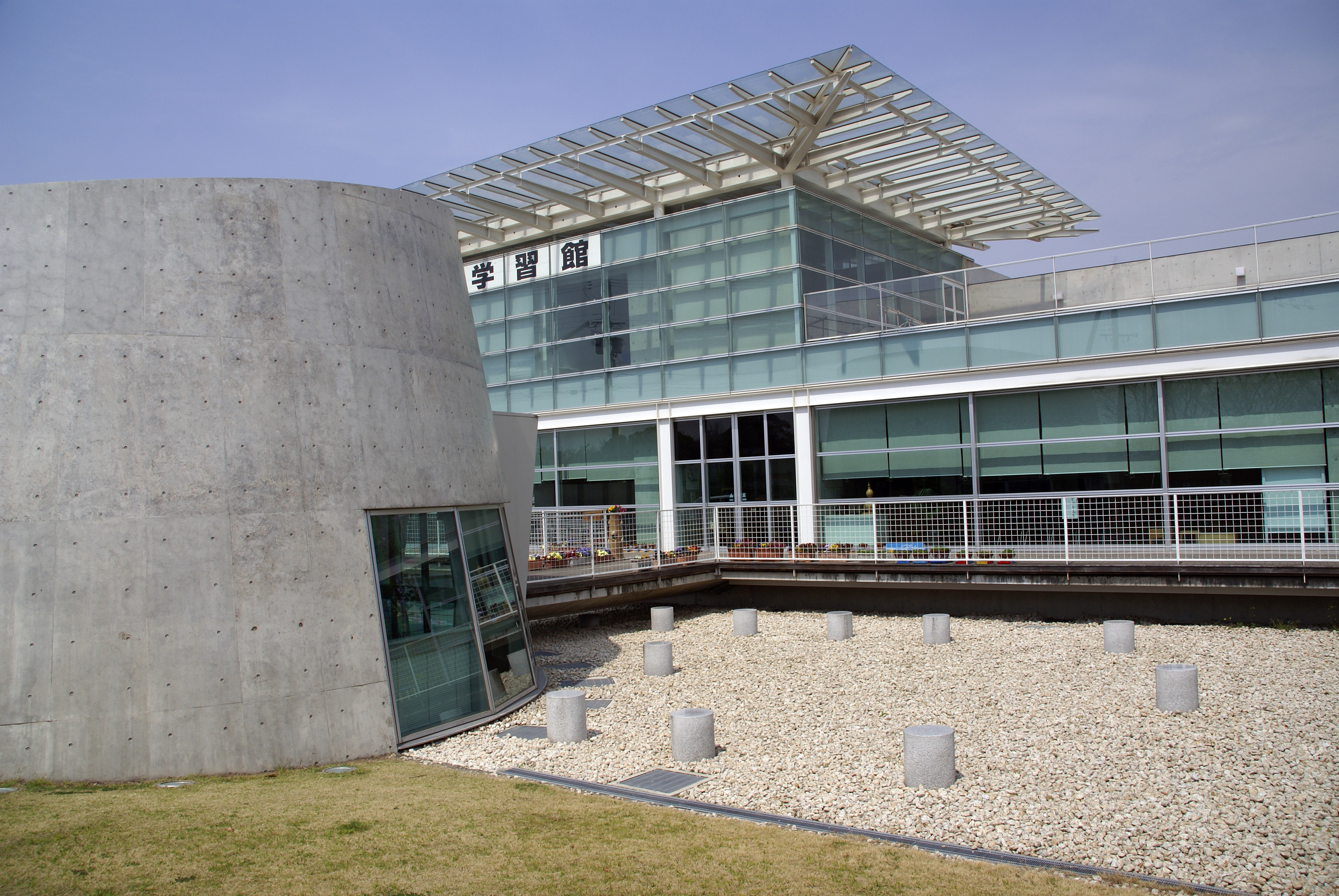
Osaka Prefectural Museum of Yayoi Culture

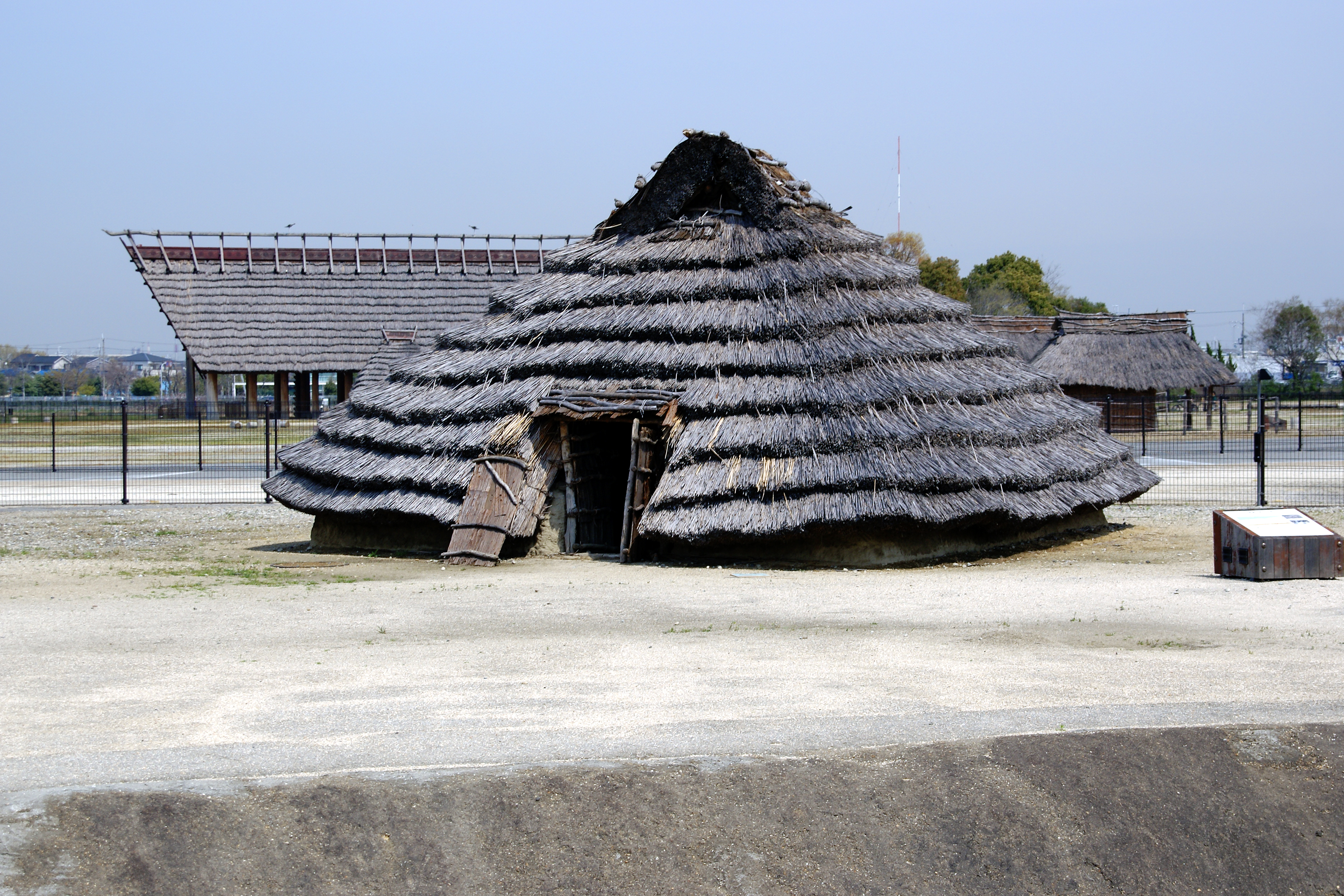
Reconstructed building at Ikegami-Sone site

== See also ==
- List of Historic Sites of Japan (Osaka)
