= Tonoki Station =

Railway station in Takaishi, Osaka Prefecture, Japan

Tonoki Station 富木駅
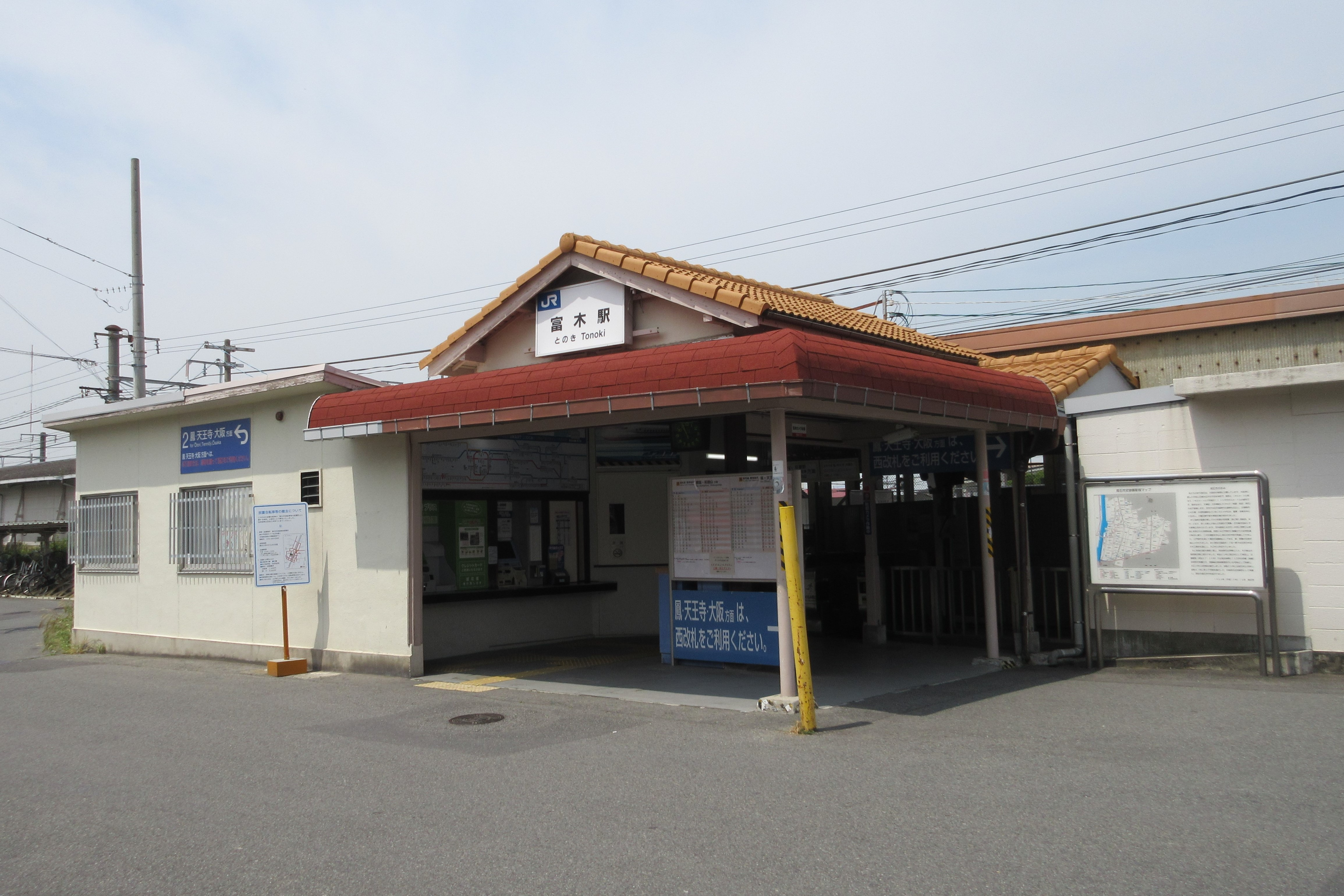
- Tonoki Station, May 2019

General information
- Location: 1-3 Toriishi 2chome, Takaishi-shi, Osaka-fu 592-0013; Japan
- Coordinates: 34°31′22″N 135°27′06″E
- Owner: West Japan Railway Company
- Operator: West Japan Railway Company
- Line: R Hanwa Line
- Distance: 16.3 km (10.1 miles) from Tennōji
- Platforms: 2 side platforms
- Connections: Bus stop

Other information
- Status: Staffed
- Station code: JR-R34
- Website: Official website

History
- Opened: 1 March 1940

Passengers
- FY2019: 3,898 daily
Location
- Location within Osaka Prefecture Location within Japan

Tonoki Station (富木駅, Tonoki-eki) is a passenger railway station in located in the city of Izumi, Osaka Prefecture, Japan, operated by West Japan Railway Company (JR West).

== Lines ==
Tonoki Station is served by the Hanwa Line, and is located 16.3 kilometers from the northern terminus of the line at Tennōji.

== Station layout ==
The station consists of two opposed side platforms connected by an underground passage. The station is staffed.

=== Platforms ===
1	■ R Hanwa Line	for Kansai Airport and Wakayama
2	■ R Hanwa Line	for Tennōji

== Adjacent stations ==
«	Service	»
JR West
Hanwa Line
Ōtori	Local	Kita-Shinoda
Ōtori	Regional Rapid Service	Kita-Shinoda
Direct Rapid Service: Does not stop at this station
Rapid Service: Does not stop at this station
Kansai Airport Rapid Service: Does not stop at this station
Kishuji Rapid Service: Does not stop at this station
Limited Express Kuroshio: Does not stop at this station
Limited Express Haruka: Does not stop at this station

== History ==
Tonoki Station opened on 1 March 1940. With the privatization of the Japan National Railways (JNR) on 1 April 1987, the station came under the aegis of the West Japan Railway Company.

Station numbering was introduced in March 2018 with Tonoki being assigned station number JR-R34.

== Passenger statistics ==
In fiscal 2019, the station was used by an average of 3898 passengers daily (boarding passengers only).

== Surrounding area ==
- Takaishi City Hall

== See also ==
- List of railway stations in Japan
