= Izumiōtsu =

Izumiōtsu 泉大津市
- City
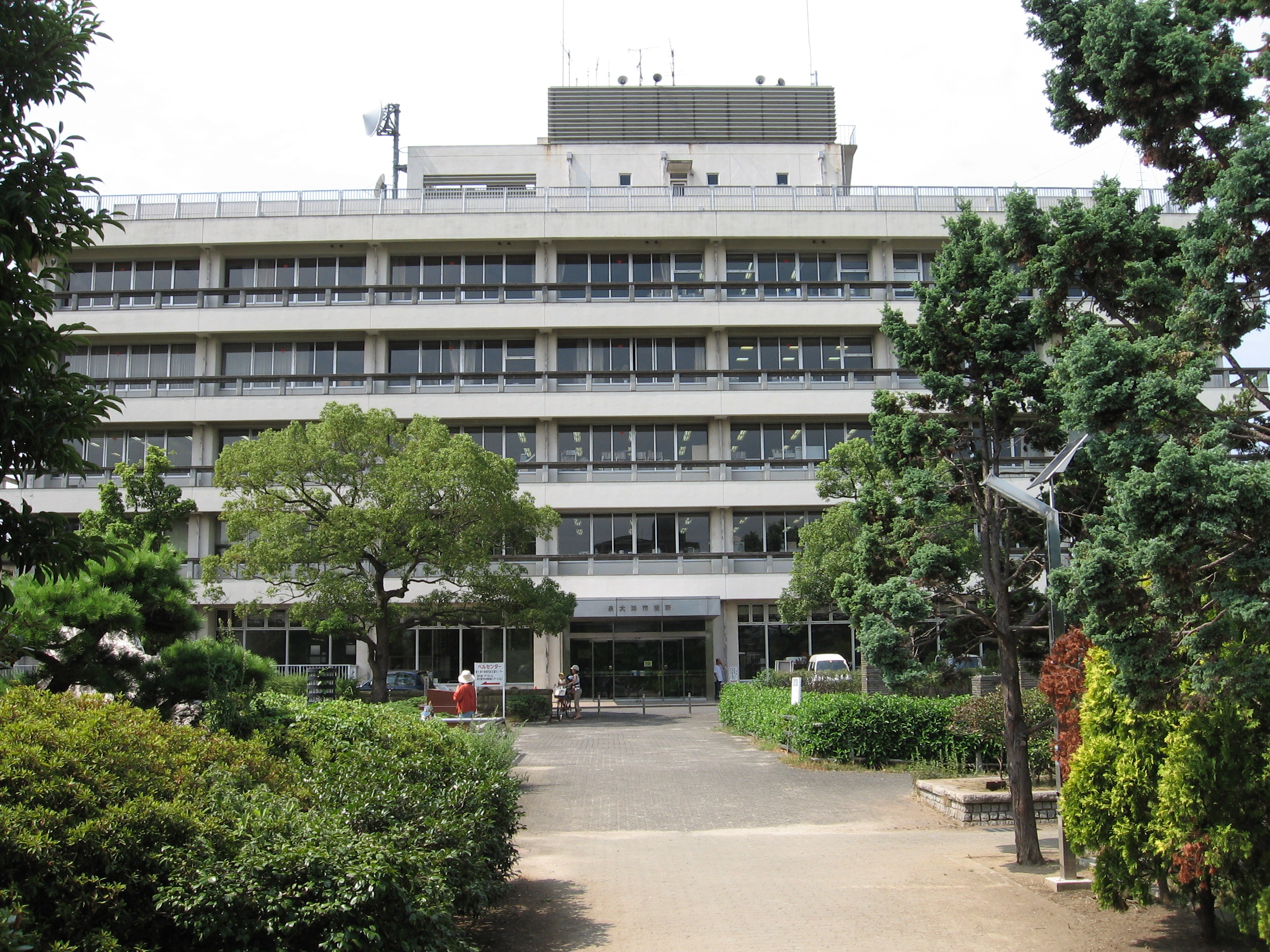
- Izumiōtsu City Hall

- Flag Emblem

- Location of Izumiōtsu in Osaka Prefecture

- Location in Japan
- Coordinates: 34°30′N 135°24′E
- Country: Japan
- Region: Kansai
- Prefecture: Osaka

Area
  - Total: 13.73 km^{2} (5.30 sq mi)

Population (January 1, 2022)
  - Total: 73,767
  - Density: 5,373/km^{2} (13,920/sq mi)
- Time zone: UTC+09:00 (JST)
- City hall address: 9–12 Shinonome, Izumiotsu-shi, Osaka-fu 595-8686
- Website: Official website
- Symbols
- Flower: Rhododendron
- Tree: Cinnamomum

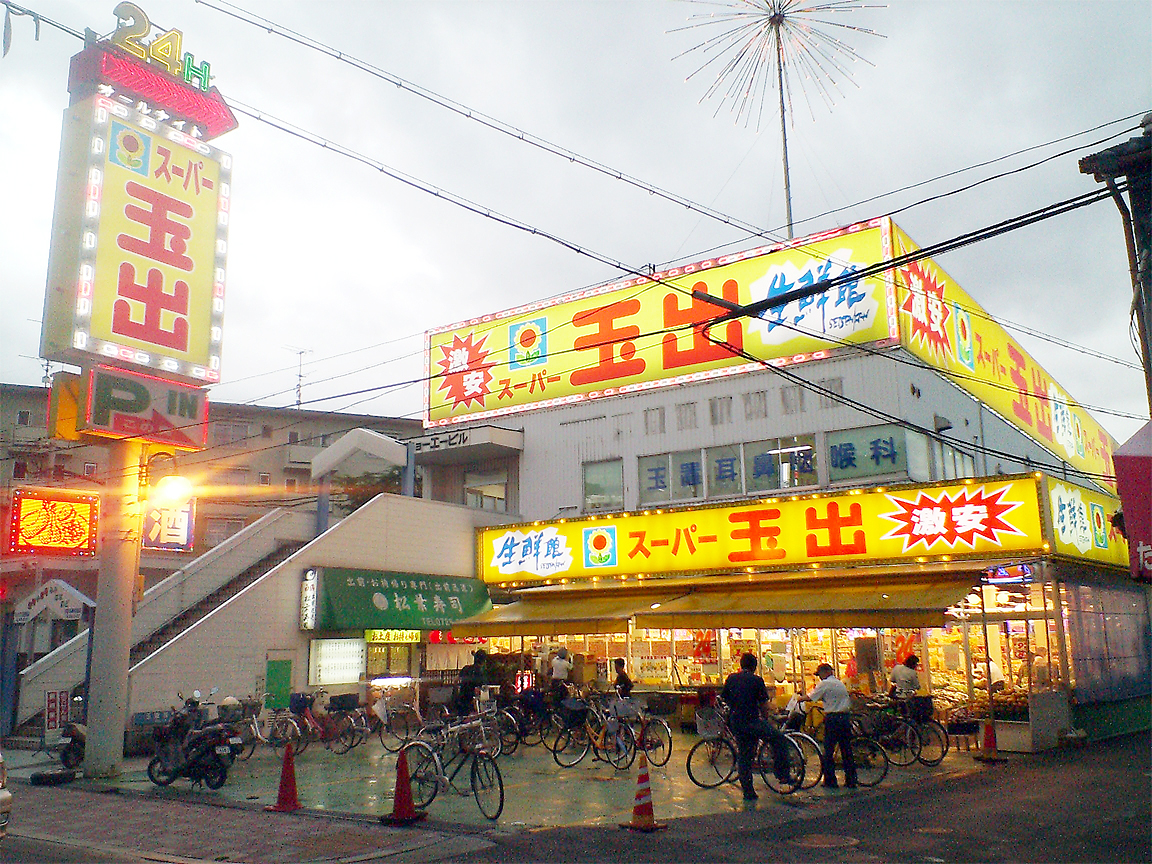
Supermarket in Izumiōtsu

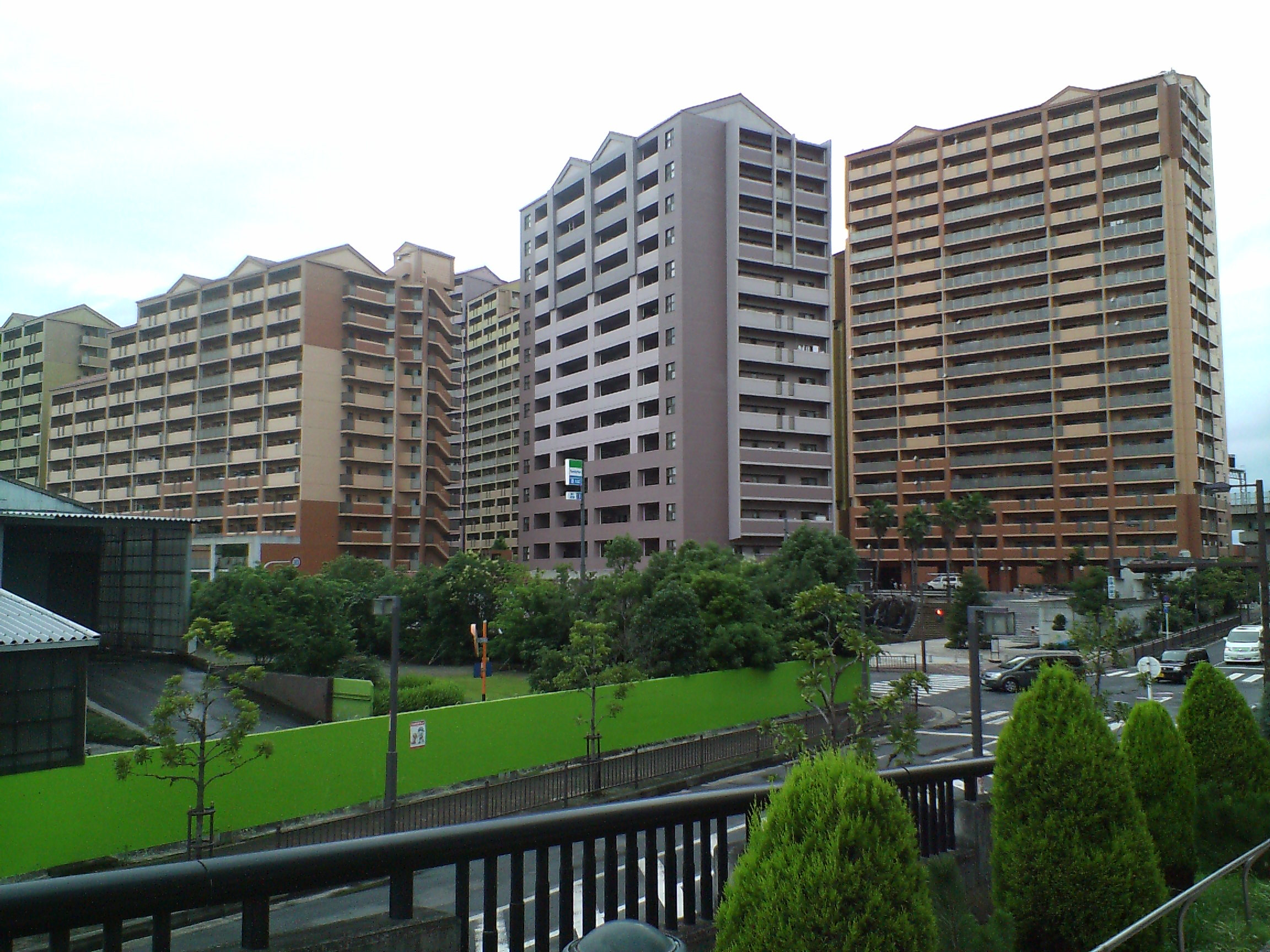
Kirara Town housing complex in Izumiōtsu

Izumiōtsu (泉大津市, Izumiōtsu-shi; Japanese pronunciation: [ì.(d͡)zɨ́.mí.ó̞ò̞.t͡sɨ̀, -ó̞ó̞.t͡sɨ̥.ɕì]) is a city in Osaka Prefecture, Japan. As of 1 January 2022, the city had an estimated population of 73,767 in 34920 households and a population density of 5400 persons per km^{2}. The total area of the city is 13.73 square kilometres (5.30 sq mi).

== Geography ==
Izumiōtsu is located in the southern part of Osaka Prefecture, with Osaka Bay to the northwest. The terrain is almost flat throughout the city, and the entire city is an urbanized area. The city is about 5.4 kilometers east-west and 5.5 kilometers north-south. About 4.8 square kilometers is reclaimed land along the coast.

=== Neighboring municipalities ===
Osaka Prefecture

- Izumi
- Tadaoka
- Takaishi

== Climate ==
Izumiōtsu has a humid subtropical climate (Köppen Cfa) characterized by warm summers and cool winters with light to no snowfall. The average annual temperature in Izumiōtsu is 14.7 °C. The average annual rainfall is 1475 mm with September as the wettest month. The temperatures are highest on average in August, at around 26.7 °C, and lowest in January, at around 3.4 °C.

== Demographics ==
Per Japanese census data, the population of Izumiōtsu had been on the rise until the early 2000s, but has been on the decline since 2005.

Historical population
Year	Pop.	±%
1920	14,028	—
1930	19,563	+39.5%
1940	27,800	+42.1%
1950	33,341	+19.9%
1960	42,304	+26.9%
1970	59,437	+40.5%
1980	67,474	+13.5%
1990	67,035	−0.7%
2000	75,901	+13.2%
2010	77,564	+2.2%

== History ==
The area of the modern city of Izumiōtsu was within ancient Izumi Province, and was the site of the port for the provincial capital of the province. During the Yayoi period it was a stronghold of the Mononobe clan and the place name of "Ōtsu" appears in the Nara period Nihon Shoki, the Heian period Sarashina Nikki and other works. In the Edo Period, the area was controlled by Hakata Domain or as tenryō territory of the Tokugawa shogunate administered by Kishiwada Domain. The village of Ōtsu was established within Izumi District with the creation of the modern municipalities system on April 1, 1889. On April 1, 1896 the area became part of Senboku District, Osaka. Ōtsu was promoted to town status on April 1, 1915 and to city status on April 1, 1942. To avoid confusion with the city of Ōtsu, Shiga, the city name was chosen to be "Izumiōtsu".

== Government ==
Izumiōtsu has a mayor-council form of government with a directly elected mayor and a unicameral city council of 16 members. Izumiōtsu collectively with the city of Takaishi and the town of Tadaoka contributes two members to the Osaka Prefectural Assembly. In terms of national politics, the city is part of Osaka 18th district of the lower house of the Diet of Japan.

== Economy ==
The textile industry has been important to Izumiōtsu since the Edo period, and the city still commands more than 90% of the domestic cotton blanket market. The port was also modernized in the early 20th century and occupies a part of the Sakai Senboku coastal industrial area. Sumitomo Rubber Industries, a major producer of automobile tires, is also a major employer.

== Education ==
Izumiōtsu has eight public elementary schools and three public middle schools operated by the city government and one public high school operated by the Osaka Prefectural Department of Education. The city previously had a North Korean school, Senshu Korean Elementary School (泉州朝鮮初級学校).

== Transportation ==
=== Railway ===
Nankai Electric Railway - Nankai Main Line

- Izumiōtsu - Kita-Sukematsu - Matsunohama

=== Highway ===
- Bayshore Route
- National Route 26

== Sister cities ==
- Geelong, Australia, friendship city since April 28, 1992
- Gwangyang, South Jeolla South Korea, friendship city since May 29, 2008

== Local attractions ==
- Ikegami-Sone site, National Historic Site

== Notable people from Izumiōtsu ==
- Kōki Aoyagi, Japanese professional baseball player (outfielder, Yokohama DeNA BayStars, Nippon Professional Baseball – Central League)
- Mariko Gotō, Japanese singer, lyricist, composer and actress
- Mizuho Katayama (Real Name: Kim Mijinsu, Hangul: 김미진수), Zainichi Korean synchronized swimming coach
- Hiromi Kawata, Japanese free announcer
- Sou Nishimura, Japanese mangaka
- Mitsuki Sumoto, Japanese figure skater
- Takashi Tachibana, Japanese social activist, journalist, accountant and politician
