= Kubosō Memorial Museum of Arts, Izumi =

- 和泉市久保惣記念美術館
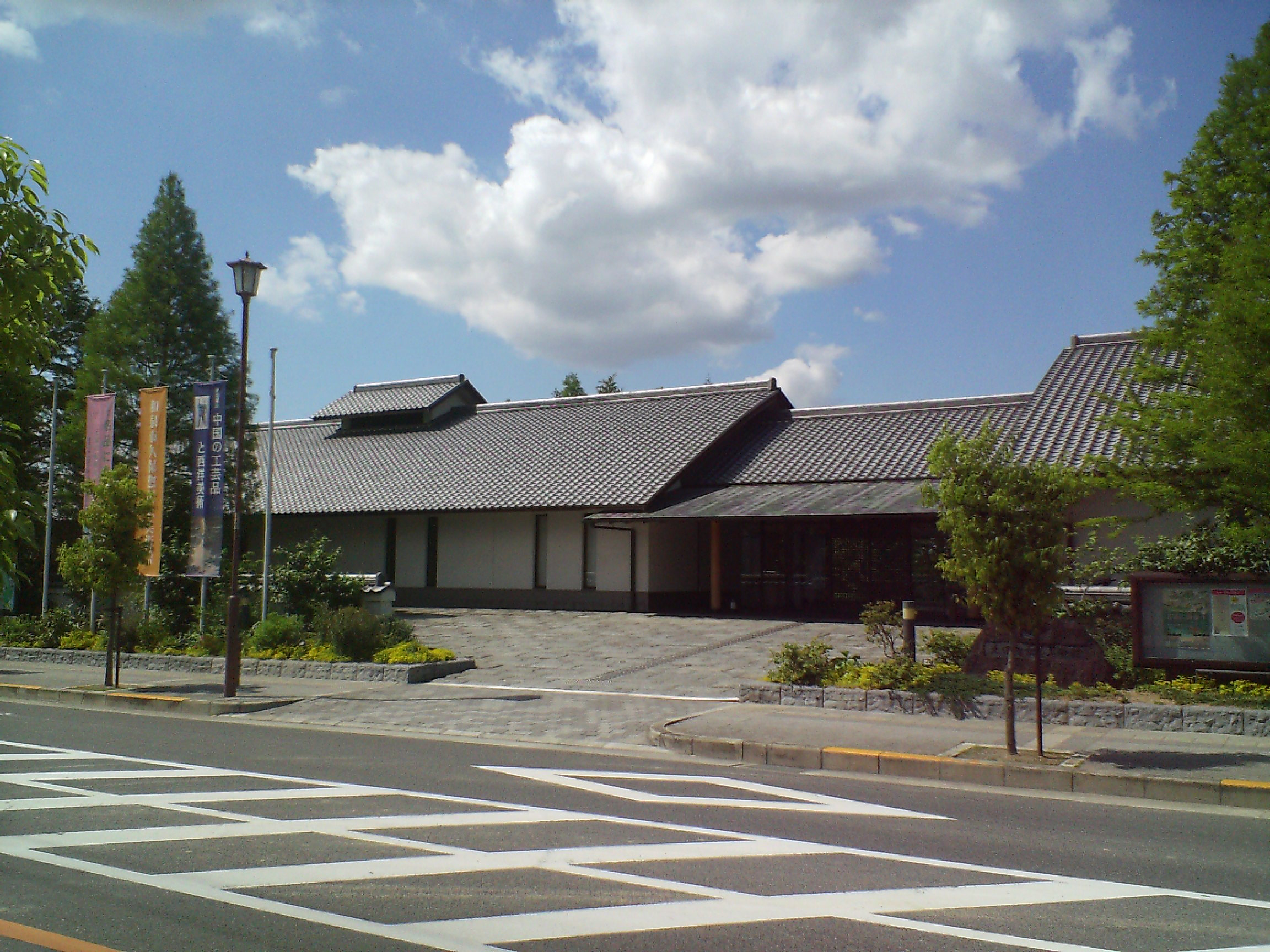
- Interactive map of the Kubosō Memorial Museum of Arts, Izumi area

General information
- Location: 3-6-12 Uchida-chō, Izumi, Osaka Prefecture, Japan
- Coordinates: 34°26′42″N 135°27′13″E
- Opened: October 1982

Website
- Official website

The Kubosō Memorial Museum of Arts, Izumi (和泉市久保惣記念美術館, Izumi-shi Kubosō Kinen Bijutsukan) opened in Izumi, Osaka Prefecture, Japan, in 1982. The new wing was added in 1997. The local Kubo family, founders of the Kubosō cotton textile business, donated the land, buildings, collection, and funds for the museum's management to the city. The collection of some eleven thousand works includes two National Treasures (the Kasen Uta-awase scroll and the Southern Song celadon vase with phoenix ears known as Bansei) and twenty-nine Important Cultural Properties.

== See also ==
- Fujita Art Museum
- List of National Treasures of Japan (writings: Japanese books)
- List of National Treasures of Japan (crafts: others)
