= Izumi, Osaka =

Izumi 和泉市
- City
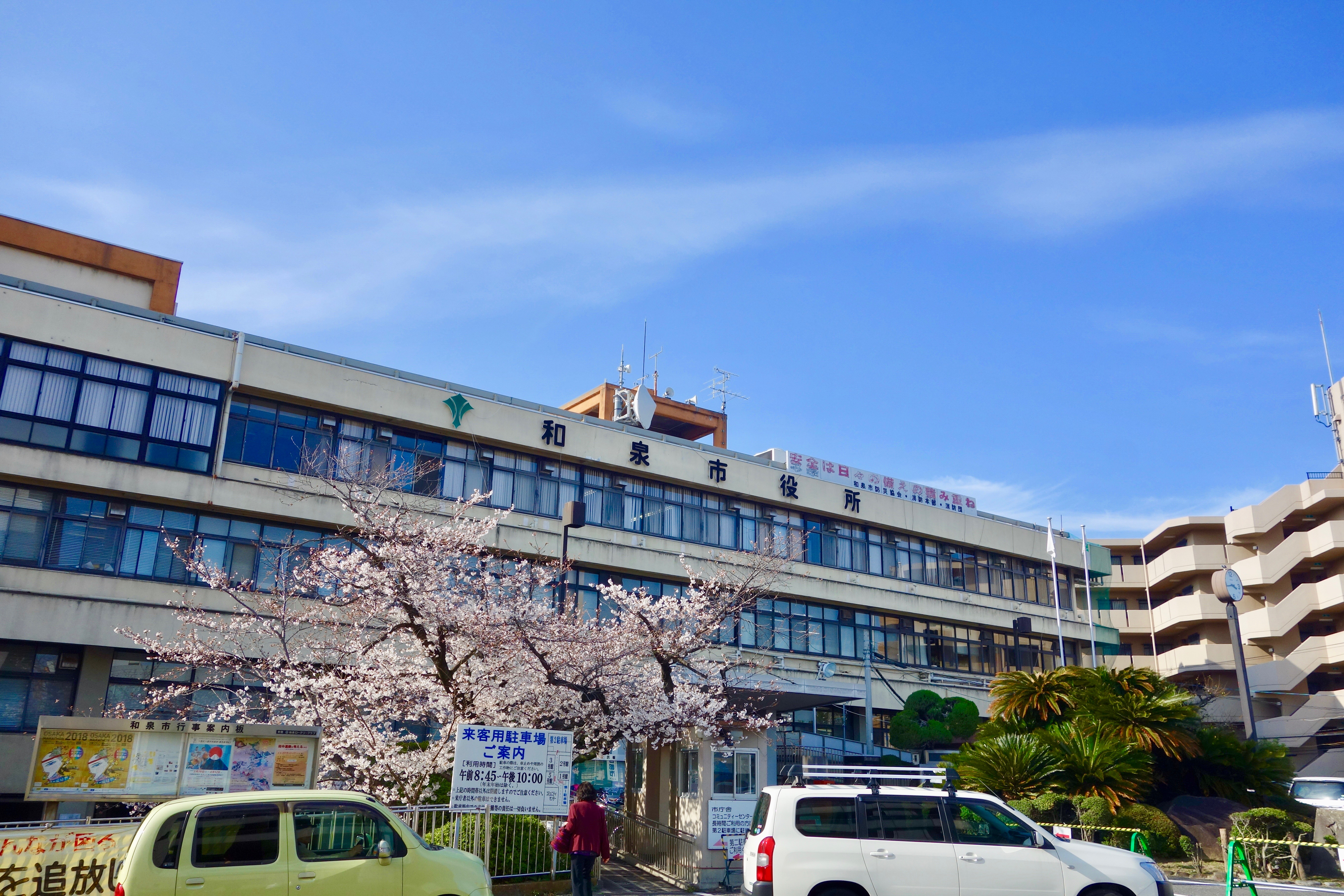
- Izumi City Hall

- Flag Emblem

- Location of Izumi in Osaka Prefecture

- Location in Japan
- Coordinates: 34°29′N 135°25′E
- Country: Japan
- Region: Kansai; Kinki
- Prefecture: Osaka

Government
  - Mayor: Yoshiyuki Isaka

Area
  - Total: 84.98 km^{2} (32.81 sq mi)

Population (December 31, 2021)
  - Total: 184,615
  - Density: 2,172/km^{2} (5,627/sq mi)
- Time zone: UTC+09:00 (JST)
- City hall address: 2-7-5 Fuchūchō, Izumi-shi, Ōsaka-fu 594-8501
- Website: Official website
- Symbols
- Flower: Narcissus
- Tree: Camphor laurel

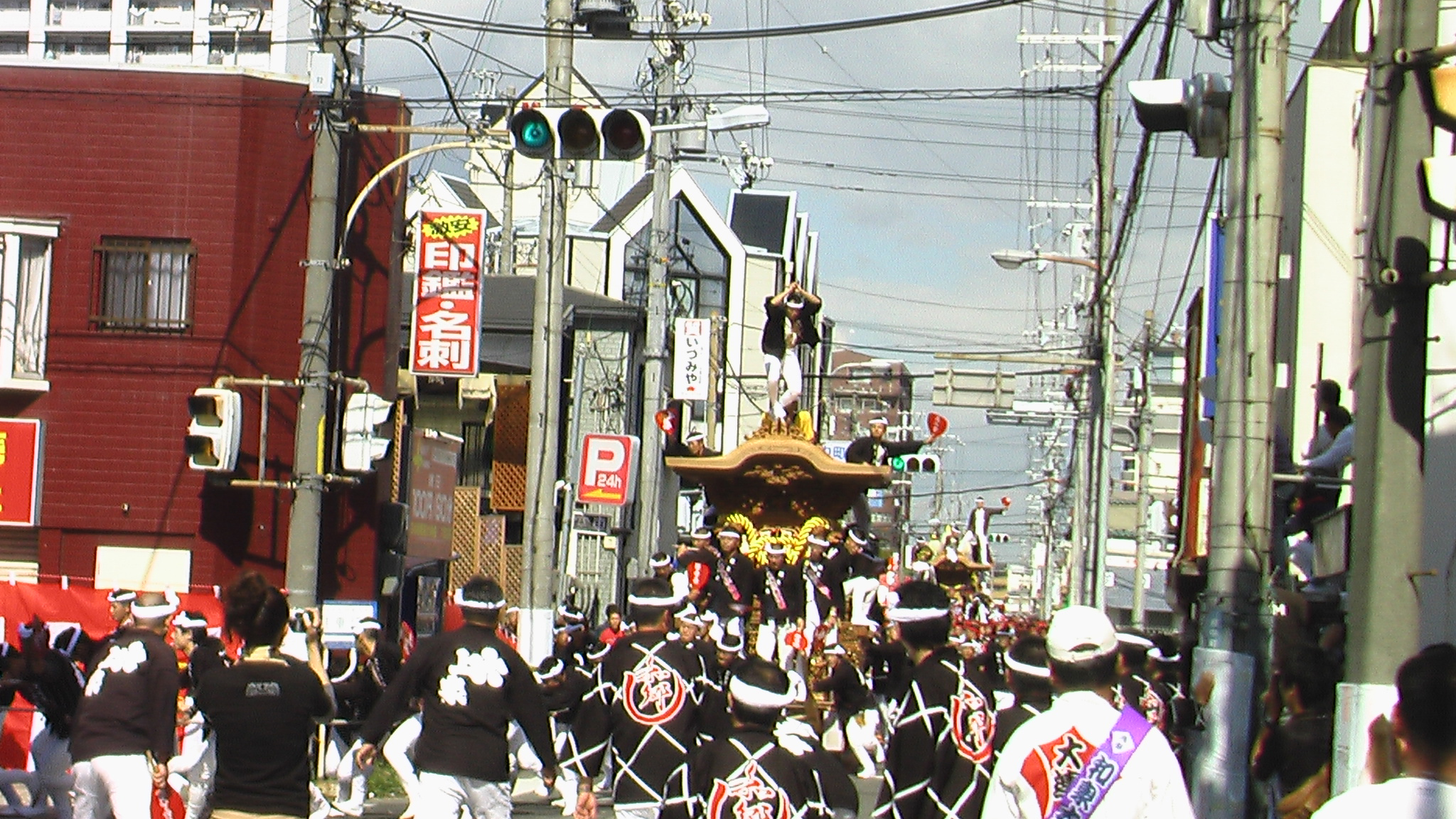
Izumi Danjiri Matsuri

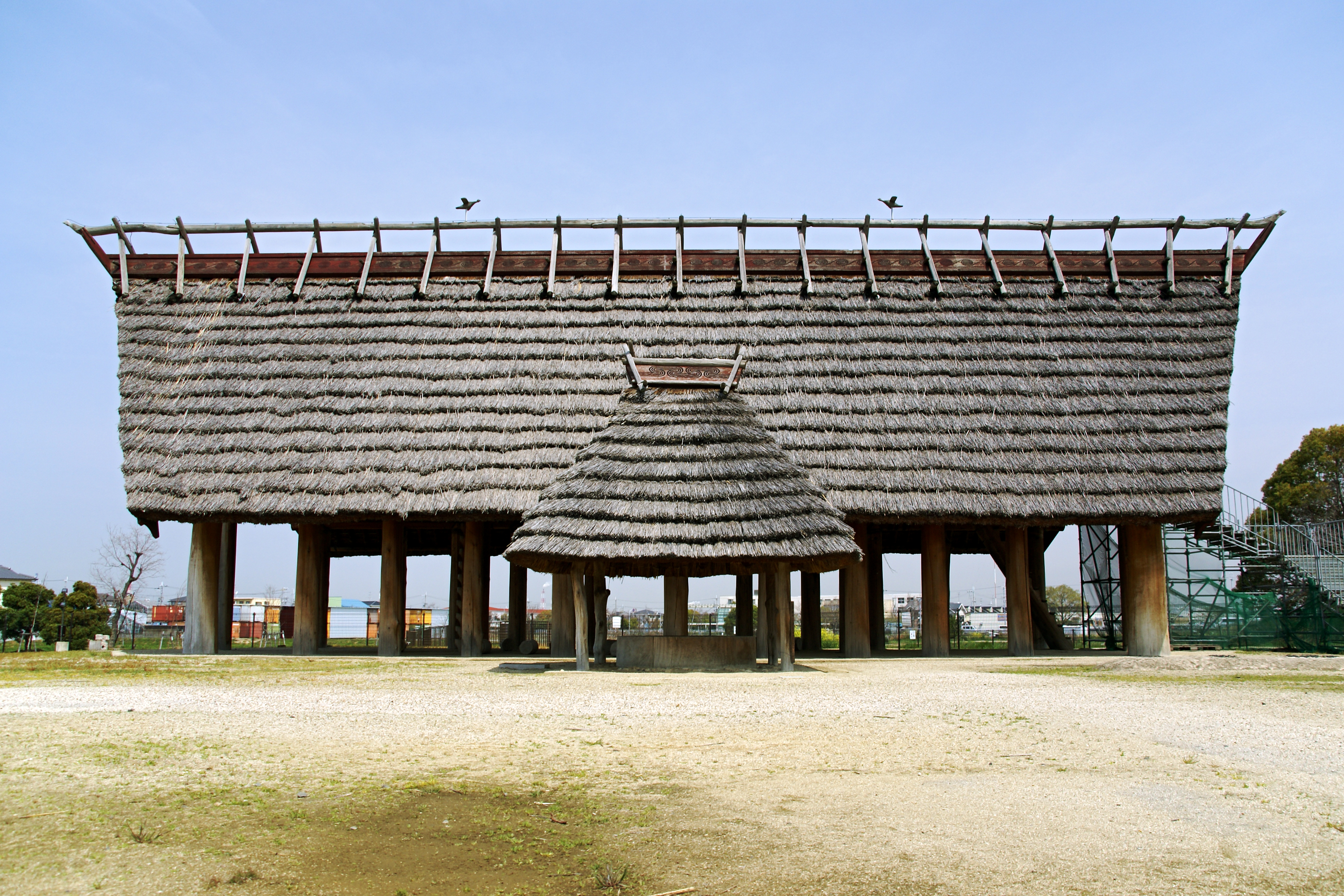
Ikegami-Sone Ruins

Izumi (和泉市, Izumi-shi; Japanese pronunciation: [í.(d͡)zɨ̀.mʲì, ì.(d͡)zɨ́.mʲí.ɕì)]) is a city located in Osaka Prefecture, Japan. As of 31 December 2021, the city had an estimated population of 184,615 in 80862 households and a population density of 2200 persons per km^{2}. The total area of the city is 84.98 square kilometres (32.81 sq mi).

== Geography ==
Izumi is located in the southwestern part of Osaka Prefecture, about 25 km from the city center of Osaka and about 20 km from Kansai International Airport, forming a long and narrow city area (6.9 km east–west, 18.8 km north–south) from north to south. The total area of the city is the fifth largest in Osaka Prefecture after Takatsuki. The terrain is low from the southeast to the northwest, with the Izumi Mountains in the south, hills in the center and north, and flat land in the northwest. The city ranges in elevation from 9.2 meters to 885.7 meters above sea level ). Parts of the city are within the borders of the Kongō-Ikoma-Kisen Quasi-National Park.

=== Neighboring municipalities ===
Osaka Prefecture

- Kawachinagano
- Kishiwada
- Izumiōtsu
- Sakai
- Tadaoka
- Takaishi

Wakayama Prefecture

- Katsuragi

== Climate ==
Izumi has a humid subtropical climate (Köppen Cfa) characterized by warm summers and cool winters with light to no snowfall. The average annual temperature in Izumi is 14.0 °C. The average annual rainfall is 1475 mm with September as the wettest month. The temperatures are highest on average in August, at around 25.9 °C, and lowest in January, at around 2.6 °C.

== Demographics ==
Per Japanese census data, the population of Izumi has risen steadily over the past century.

Historical population
Year	Pop.	±%
1920	31,154	—
1930	36,371	+16.7%
1940	45,557	+25.3%
1950	57,796	+26.9%
1960	70,701	+22.3%
1970	95,987	+35.8%
1980	124,322	+29.5%
1990	146,127	+17.5%
2000	172,974	+18.4%
2010	185,017	+7.0%

== History ==
The area of the modern city of Izumi was within ancient Izumi Province, and was the site of the provincial capital and kokubun-ji of the province. In the Edo Period, a small portion of the area was controlled by Hakata Domain. The villages of Kokufu, Gosho and Hakata were established within Izumi District with the creation of the modern municipalities system on April 1, 1889. On April 1, 1896, the area became part of Senboku District, Osaka. The town of Izumi was created on April 1, 1933, by the merger of Kokufu, Gosho and Hakata. On September 1, 1956, Izumi merged with the villages of Kita-Ikeda, Minami-Ikeda, Minami-Matsuo, Yokoyama, and Minami-Yokoyama to form the city of Izumi.

== Government ==
Izumi has a mayor-council form of government with a directly elected mayor and a unicameral city council of 24 members. Izumi contributes two members to the Osaka Prefectural Assembly. In terms of national politics, the city is part of Osaka 18th district of the lower house of the Diet of Japan.

== Economy ==
Izumi has a mixed economy light manufacturing and agriculture. Major industries include cotton products, glass crafts, artificial pearls, processed metal products and various electronic devices. With the opening of the Semboku Rapid Railway in 1995, the city established the "Techno Stage Izumi" industrial park, which has attracted over 100 companies.

== Education ==
Izumi has 20 public elementary schools and nine public middle schools operated by the city government and three public high school operated by the Osaka Prefectural Department of Education. The prefecture also operates one special education school for the handicapped. A private college, Momoyama Gakuin University, is located in Izumi.

== Transportation ==
=== Railway ===
JR West – Hanwa Line

- Kita-Shinoda - Shinodayama - Izumi-Fuchū

Nankai Electric Railway – Semboku Line

- Izumi-Chūō

=== Highway ===
- Hanwa Expressway
- Sakai Senboku Road
- National Route 26
- National Route 170
- National Route 480

== Local attractions ==
- Ikegami-Sone Site
- Izumikoganezuka Kofun
- Kubosō Memorial Museum of Arts, Izumi
- Osaka Prefectural Museum of Yayoi Culture

== Sister cities ==
- Bloomington, Minnesota, United States

== Notable people from Izumi ==
- Jun Akiyama, professional wrestler
- Masayuki Kuwahara, professional baseball player
- Hiroto Kyoguchi, professional boxer
- Kanako Nishi, writer, novelist, essayist and artist (born in Tehran, Iran but raised in Izumi, Osaka, her family's hometown)
- Taisuke Okuno, professional mixed martial artist
- Taizo Sugitani, equestrian and Olympic show jumping rider
- Super Delfin, professional wrestler
- Mitsuo Tateishi, position player coach for the Chunichi Dragons in Japan's Nippon Professional Baseball
