= Shimoterao Nishikata Site =

- 下寺尾西方遺跡 (Japanese)
- Shimoterao Nishikata Site Shimoterao Nishikata Site (Japan)
- 35°21′49″N 139°24′01″E
- Type: settlement trace
- Periods: Yayoi period
- Location: Chigasaki, Kanagawa, Japan
- Region: Kantō region

Site notes
- Public access: Yes (no public facilities)

The Shimoterao Nishikata Site (下寺尾西方遺跡, Shimoterao Nishikata iseki) is an archaeological site in Chigasaki, Kanagawa Prefecture, in the southern Kantō region of Japan containing a middle to late Yayoi period settlement trace. The site was designated a National Historic Site of Japan in 2019. The site is located near the Shimoterao Kanga site, also a National Historic Site.

== Overview ==
The Shimoterao Nishikata Site is located at the western end of the Sagamino Plateau at an elevation of approximately 13 meters. Archaeological excavations conducted by the Chigasaki City Board of Education have found the traces of one of the largest moated settlements in the southern Kantō region dating to the latter half of the middle Yayoi period. The settlement had two phases of construction. The initial settlement extended for 200 meters east-to-west by 250 meters north-to-south, with an area of about 40,000 square meters, and was surrounded by a moat. In the later phase of the settlement, the area was extended to 400 meters east-to-west by 268 meters north-to-south, of 84,000 square meters, and the moats were correspondingly extended, and a second moat was dug. From the inside the enclosure, the foundations of 58 pit dwellings, one prehistoric storage pit and three middens with a large concentration of Yayoi pottery were discovered. In addition to various earthenware shards, other artifacts included weapons such as thick sword-bladed stone axes and hollowed-in columnar single-edged stone axes, various utilitarian stone tools as well as grindstones, small amounts of ironware and jewelry such as magatama and tubular beads. One of the magatama was a large unfinished product with a length of 6.09 cm, indicating that this was also a production site.

The site is about a ten-minute walk from Chigasaki Station.

== See also ==
- List of Historic Sites of Japan (Kanagawa)
