= Shimoterao Kanga site =

Archaeological site in Japan

Shimoterao Kanga ruins
- 下寺尾官衙遺跡群 (Japanese)
- Shimoterao Kanga ruins Shimoterao Kanga site (Japan)
- 35°21′46″N 139°23′48″E
- Periods: Nara - Heian period
- Location: Chigasaki, Kanagawa, Japan
- Region: Kantō region

History
- Built: late 7th to late 8th century AD

Site notes
- Elevation: 27 m (89 ft)
- Area: 4,810.50 m^{2} (51,779.8 sq ft)
- Public access: No

The Shimoterao Kanga ruins (下寺尾官衙遺跡群, Shimoterao kanga iseki-gun) is an archaeological site with the ruins of a Nara to Heian period government administrative complex located in what is now the city of Chigasaki in Kanagawa Prefecture in the southern Kantō region of Japan. It was designated as a National Historic Site from 2015.

== Overview ==
In the late Nara period, after the establishment of a centralized government under the Ritsuryō system and Taika Reforms, local rule over the provinces was standardized under a kokufu (provincial capital), and each province was divided into smaller administrative districts, known as (郡, gun, kōri), composed of 2–20 townships in 715 AD. Each of the districts had an administrative complex built on a semi-standardized layout based on contemporary Chinese design, and Sagami Province was divided into eight such districts. Whereas as the governor (kokushi) was an official dispatched from the central government on temporary assignment, the district rulers (gunji) were typically hereditary local chieftains or nobility.

The Shimoterao ruins are located in northern Chigasaki, in an area which corresponds to ancient Kōza District and were discovered in 2015 during construction work on the nearby JR East Sagami Line railway tracks. Most of the ruins are underneath the Chigasaki Hokuryo High School and surrounding residential districts.

The complex is a roughly rectangular enclosure, containing the foundations of a large central building which served as the county seat, flanked by buildings to the right and left forming a U-shaped courtyard. The foundations of four raised floor buildings, presumably part of the granary complex for storing taxation rice were found to the north, and the ruins a large Buddhist temple were located to the south. On the west was the ruins of a river port, as the site is located at an elevation of 13 meters overlooking the Koide River. The buildings were completed from the end of the 7th century to the first half of the 8th century and appear to have been abandoned around the first half of the 9th century.

Chigasaki city has plans to relocate the school and to transform the area into an archaeological park. Adjacent to the site is the Shimoterao Nishikata Site, a Yayoi period settlement and shell midden, which received separate National Historic Site designation in 2019.

== See also ==
- List of Historic Sites of Japan (Kanagawa)
