= Moated settlements =

Settlement type

A moated settlement (環濠集落) (English: moated settlements, ditched settlements, ditch-enclosed settlements ) is a human settlement (village) surrounded by a moat. It is thought to be a new settlement boundary facility brought from the continent along with paddy rice agriculture.

== Roots ==
The roots of the "moat encircling" and "moat shelter" are thought to be in the middle reaches of the Changjiang River and South Mongolia (Xinglongkubo culture), respectively, and in the Japanese archipelago, and were produced in Yayoi Era and Middle Ages.

In the middle reaches of the Yangtze River, a moat encircling settlement dating back about 8,000 years has been discovered at the Pengtoushan site on the Li Yang Plain in Hunan Province.。The diameter of this moat encircling settlement is approximately 200 meters, with the western side connected to a natural river, and a moat approximately 20 meters wide running around the northern, eastern, and southern sides. Although not fully excavated yet, it is the site of rice paddy rice cultivation farming.

A moated settlement dating from about 8200 to 7400 years ago has been found at the Xinglongbubo site in Inner Mongolia Red Peak City. The settlement is bounded by a ditch with a long axis of 183 meters and a short axis of 166 meters with a flat shape that goes around an elliptical shape. The ditch is approximately 1.5 to 2 meters wide and about 1 meter deep. About 100 pit houses have been discovered inside the moat encircling the village. The village's occupation is field farming, which includes the cultivation of millet and other crops.

== Japan ==
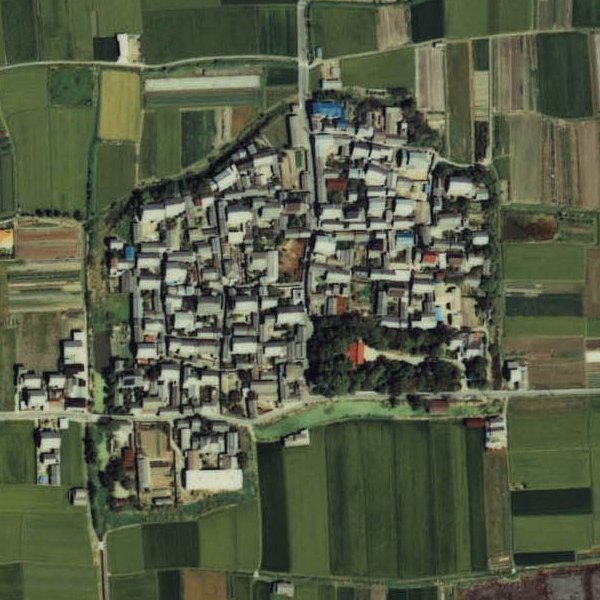
Moat encircling village existing in Hiedacho, Yamato Koriyama City, Nara Prefecture. Compiled from "National Land Image Information (Color Aerial Photographs)" by the Ministry of Land, Infrastructure, Transport and Tourism.

=== Characteristics ===
Moat encircling settlements are characterized as defenses and bases. The moat encircling the settlement was excavated in a deep V shape and pointed stakes called Gyakumogi were embedded around the moat encircling it, suggesting that the settlement had a defensive character. Large settlements are considered to be political and economic settlements and to have the characteristics of hub settlements because they have been in existence for a long time, have a large population, have small settlements in the vicinity, have residences of chiefs and large dugout buildings for rituals, have produced metalware, and have had exchange goods excavated from remote areas.

In the Wakoku period, which is considered to be the period of the formation of kingship in Wakoku, the settlements became more defensive in nature and, together with hill towns, are considered to reflect military affairs trends in the process of the formation of kingship. As the formation of kingship progressed into the Kofun period, the chiefs began to locate their residences outside the community, and moat encircling settlements were gradually dismantled.

=== Jomon Period ===
Moat encircling settlements are also found in the southern Korean Peninsula, and in Kitakyushu there are moat encircling settlements from the late Jomon period (4th century BC). The Jōmon people tend not to form moat encircling settlements. However, at the Shizukawa 16 site in HokkaidoTomakomai City about 4,000 years ago (late middle to early late Jomon), a V-shaped ditch about 1 to 2 meters wide and 2 meters deep with a major axis of 56 meters and a minor axis of 40 A moat encircling settlement was discovered at the Shizukawa 16 site in Shizukawa City. Two circular pit houses were found inside the moat encircling the site, and 15 were found outside the moat encircling the site. It would be different in character from the moat encircling settlements of the Yayoi period. For example, it may have been a space for Jomon rituals. This site is currently the only moat encircling settlement of the Jomon period. Although not a moat encircling settlement, there is a late Late Period double fence in Kami-shinjo, Akita Prefecture, a straight ditch separating a residence and a cemetery in Koba, Ibaraki Prefecture, and a late Late Period to early Late Period Miyago shell mound in Saitama Prefecture. These were used to enclose places of worship, cemeteries, etc., and separate them from places of daily ranking.

=== Yayoi Period ===
Moat encircling settlements are thought to have been introduced from the continent at the same time as the rice culture, and to have spread to the eastern part of the archipelago. However, from the late 2nd century to the early 3rd century, the moat encircling settlements that characterized the Yayoi period disappeared in many areas. This is thought to indicate a major change in politics from western Japan to the Tokai and Kanto region during this period.

Moat encircling settlements of this period can be classified into two types: the lowland type, located on slightly elevated alluvial land, and the upland type, located on high ground such as plateaus and hills. The lowland type is surrounded by a water moat, while the highland type is surrounded by a moat shelter.

So far, the oldest moat encircling settlement of the Yayoi period has been found at the Etsuji site in Kasuya Town, located on the Genkai Sea coast of northern Kyushu.

There are no early moat encircling settlements in the Kinki region, but there is the Kobe CityOobiraki site in the first half of the Early Period. The moat encircling the site was 70 meters in diameter and 40 meters in diameter, and a pit-house and a storage pit have been found within the moat. The cross section of the moat encircling the site was V-shaped and inverted trapezoidal, and the ditch was estimated to have been 2 meters wide and 1.5 meters deep. Stone tools made up a large proportion of the stone tools excavated.

The Asahi Site in Aichi Prefecture is a settlement of the Middle Yayoi Period and is known as one of the most advanced moat encircling settlements in terms of defensive facilities. It is thought that a large moat was built around the outside of the settlement, and earthen mounds were constructed on the inside with the soil from the moat. Furthermore, a double fence with inverted bushes and random piles were built on the outer side of the moat. Moat encircling settlements that developed after the end of the early Yayoi period are thought to have been established independently in preparation for Battle between villages, such as land and water conflicts caused by the establishment of rice paddy farming in the areas west of the Nōbi Plain.

Around that time, moated settlements appeared at the Itazuke site in Fukuoka City, the Ama Ruins in Osaka PrefectureTakatsuki City, and the Ogiya Ruins in Kyōtango, Kyōtango, Kyoto Prefecture. In Itazuke, a V-shaped ditch with a reconstructed width of more than 2 meters and a depth of more than 1 mail in cross section is moated in an oval shape with a long diameter of 120 meters and a short diameter of 100 meters. There are also dwellings and holehouses outside the moat. At the Ougitani site, the moat encircles the village with a ring moat 6 meters wide and 4 meters deep at its widest, or 270 meters long and 250 meters deep at its shortest. It is thought that the mura was defended from these remains.

It is also thought that in western Japan, such as Northern Kyushu and the Kinki region, the creation of villages was common at the end of the Early Yayoi Period, when paddy rice agriculture took root. After the middle Yayoi period, moat encircling settlements became widespread in the Kinki region, with large moat encircling moats of 300 to 400 meters in diameter, and people apparently congregated within the moats.

In the Late Period, large moat encircling settlements such as the Saga Prefecture Yoshinogari site in northern Kyushu, the Amma site and Ikegami Sone site in Osaka Prefecture, the Karako-Kagi site in Ikegami-Sone Site, and the Karako-Kagi Site in Nara Prefecture.

They were built on low ground and usually have earthworks, which were dug out of the moat (in contrast, earthworks in the Middle Ages are on the inside of the moat). The purpose of forming a moat encircling a mura to distinguish the interior from the exterior is thought to be to provide a defensive function to protect the settlement from foreign enemies and beasts. Moats are sometimes double or triple moat encircling, and some form long moat encircling belts. It is also thought to reflect the chiefpower necessary for rice farming, the strengthening of community cohesion, and the class difference between the inside and outside. In the case of water moats, they can also function as drainage.

=== Middle Ages ===
In the Sengoku era of the late Muromachi period (1336-1573), wars were frequent, and some farm villages built moats around their settlements to protect them from attack. The most important Buddhist Buddhist temples existed in the center, and the larger ones became Jinaicho. Some of the moat encircling the temple still remains today, such as Imai-chō. One of the existing settlements, Hieda moat encircling village (Yamatokoriyama City, Nara Prefecture), is centered around the Uruta Shrine. Takuya Hamano and Genjiro Minoda's book, "A Village with a Hori" (June 1973, Iwasaki Shoten, Boys and Girls Historical Novel Series) is based on the ancient records of Uruta Shrine.

== Ancient ruins ==
There are still a few moat encircling settlements that have remained intact since that time. The remains of Yoshinogari ruins have revealed the whole picture of a large moat encircling settlement. In addition, the recent excavation of the Sutsukabana site in Hakuta-cho, Yasugi City, one of the legendary sites of the Ijanami mausoleum, has attracted much attention.

=== Early ===
- Etsuji Site (Kasuya-cho, Fukuoka Prefecture) Late Yayoi Period (Early Yayoi Period), a shallow ditch about 1 meter wide runs twice around the perimeter. This settlement may have been established under the strong influence of the southern part of the Korean Peninsula.
- Naka Site (Fukuoka Prefecture) Double moat encircling a regular circle, 150 meters in outer diameter.

=== Last term ===
It spreads eastward from northern Kyushu to the Seto Inland Sea coastal area and Osaka Bay coast. The size is 70–150 meters in diameter, ovoid, small, and does not enlarge into a large annulus.

- Itazuke Ruins (Fukuoka City)
- Hyakkenkawa Sawada Site (Okayama Prefecture)
- Nakanoike Site (Zentsuji City, Kagawa Prefecture)
- Daikai ruins (Kobe city, Hyogo Prefecture)
- The Ama Site (Takatsuki City, Osaka Prefecture)
- Ougidani Site (Kyotango City, Kyoto Prefecture, formerly Mineyama Town, San'in Region, a double moat encircled by a moat, from which earthenware, stone tools, iron axes, jade making tools, glass blocks, clay flutes, etc. were excavated)

=== Mid-term and beyond ===
- Harunotsuji Site (Southeast of Iki Island, Nagasaki Prefecture)
- Yoshinogari ruins (Saga Yoshinogari Town)
- Sutrazukabana site (Shimane Yasugi City)
- Ikegami-Sone Site (straddling Izumi City and Izumiotsu City, Osaka Prefecture)
- Yamatokoriyama City, Nara Prefecture)
- Karako-Kagi Site (Nara Prefecture Tawaramoto Town)
- Ota-Kuroda Site (Wakayama City, Wakayama Prefecture)
- Asahi Site (located in Kiyosu City, Kasuga Town, and Nagoya City, Aichi Prefecture): The site with the most extensive defensive facilities.
- Kanzaki Site (located in Ayase City, Kanagawa Prefecture)
- Otsuka-Saikachido Site (Kanagawa Yokohama)

== Existing settlements ==
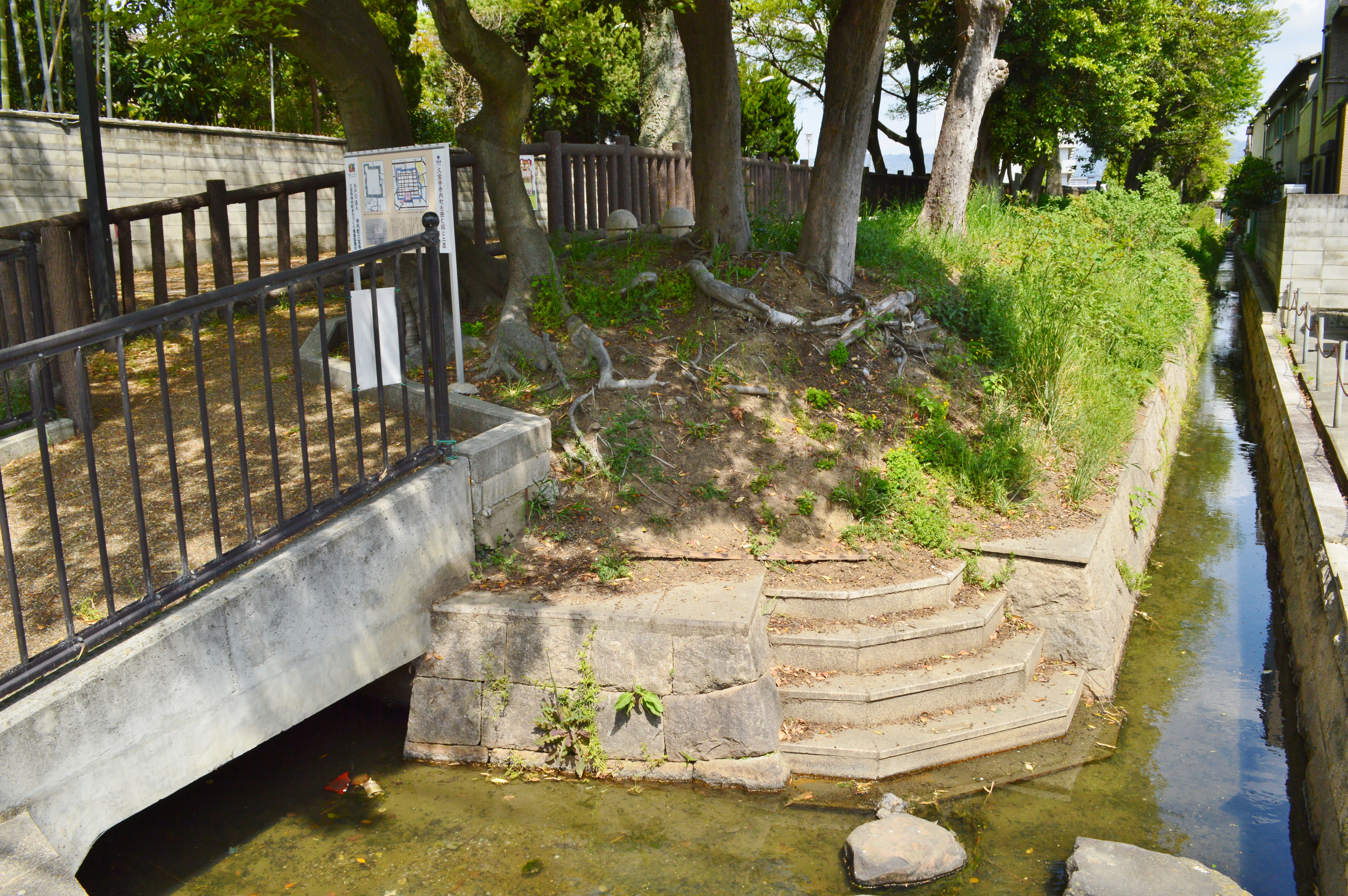
The moat encircling Kuhoji Terauchi-machi. Located in the center of the large city of Yao, Osaka, the original moat encircling settlement has hardly survived.

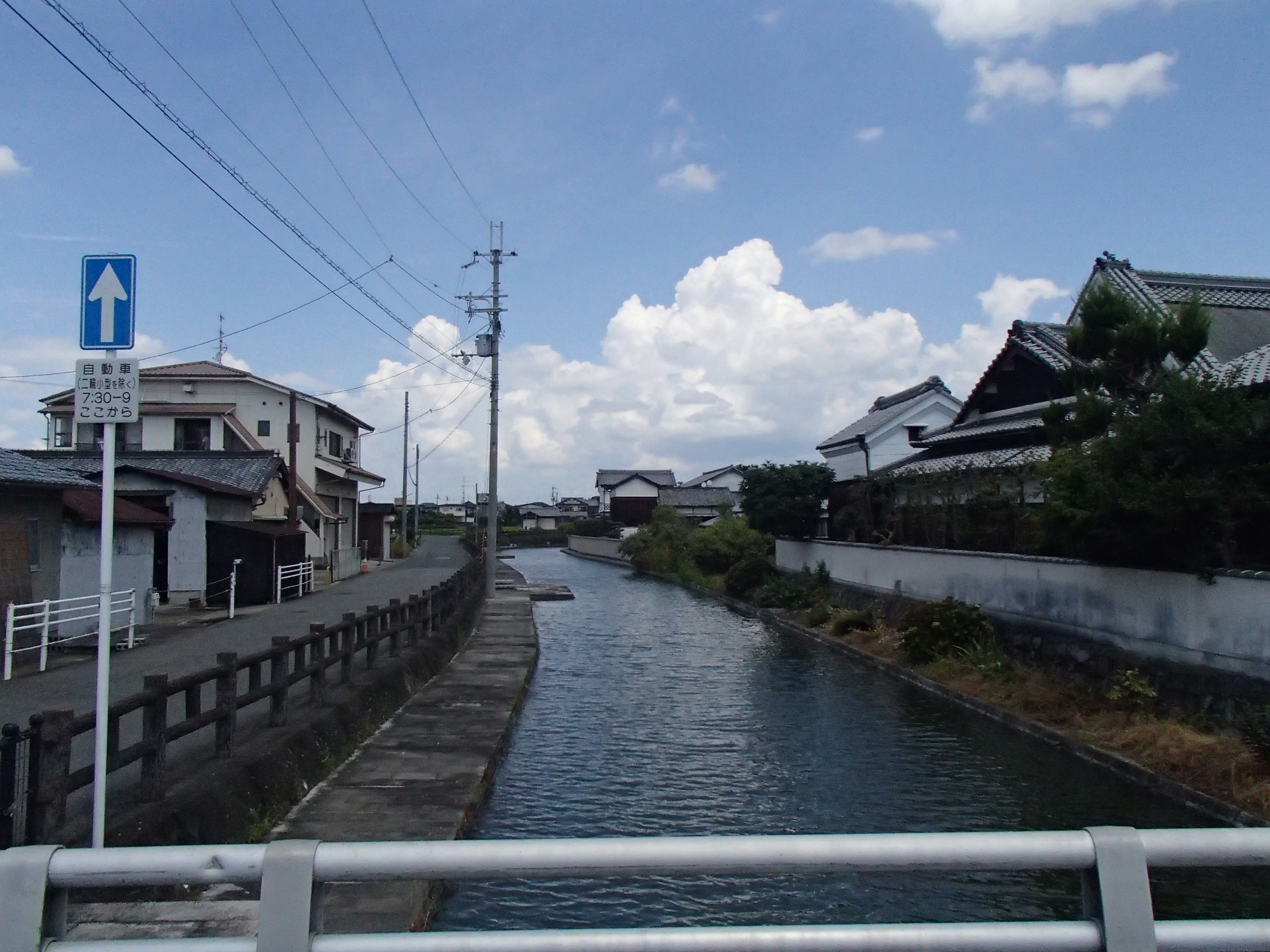
Milieda moat encircling settlement

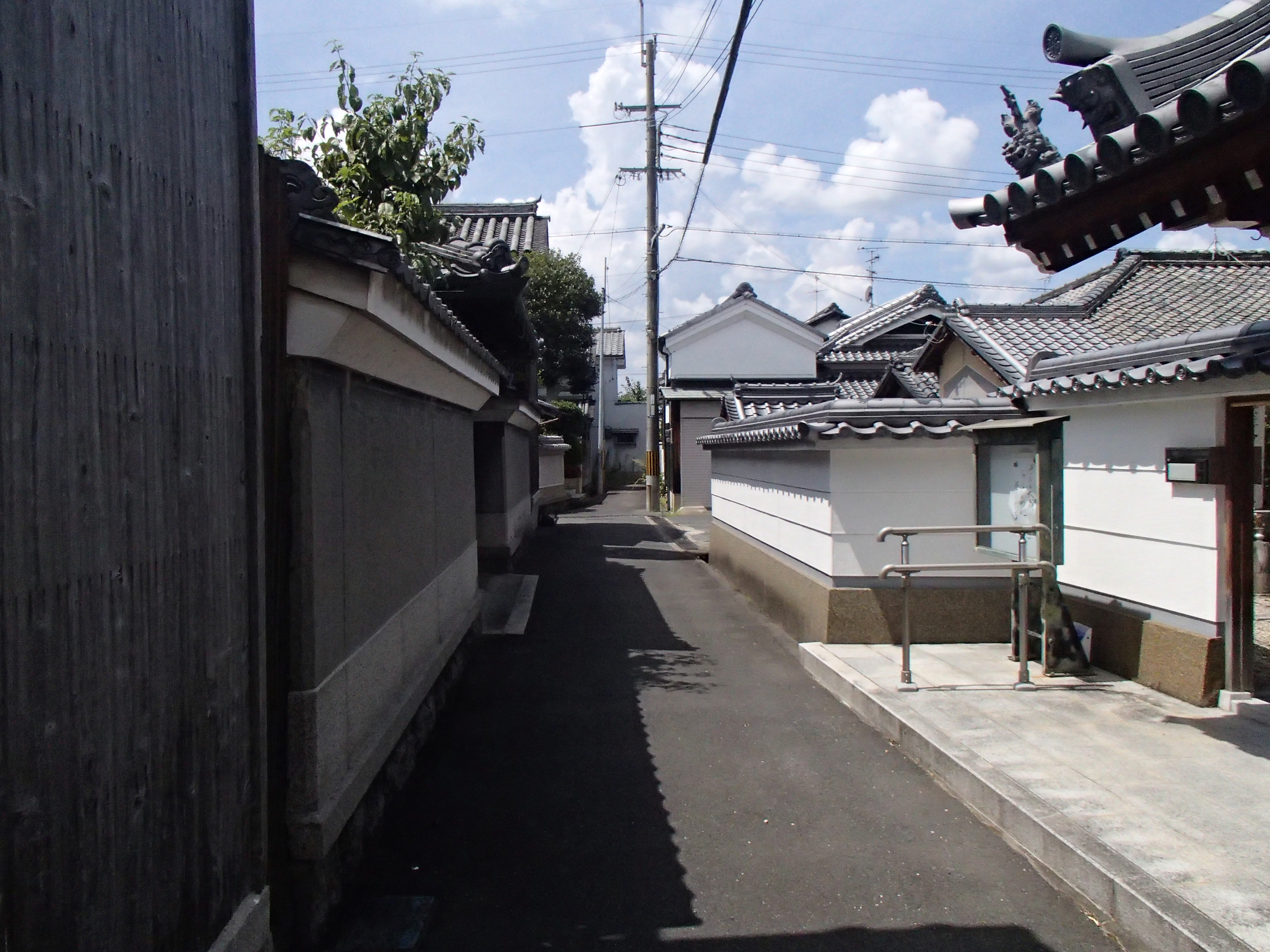
Milieda moat encircling settlement

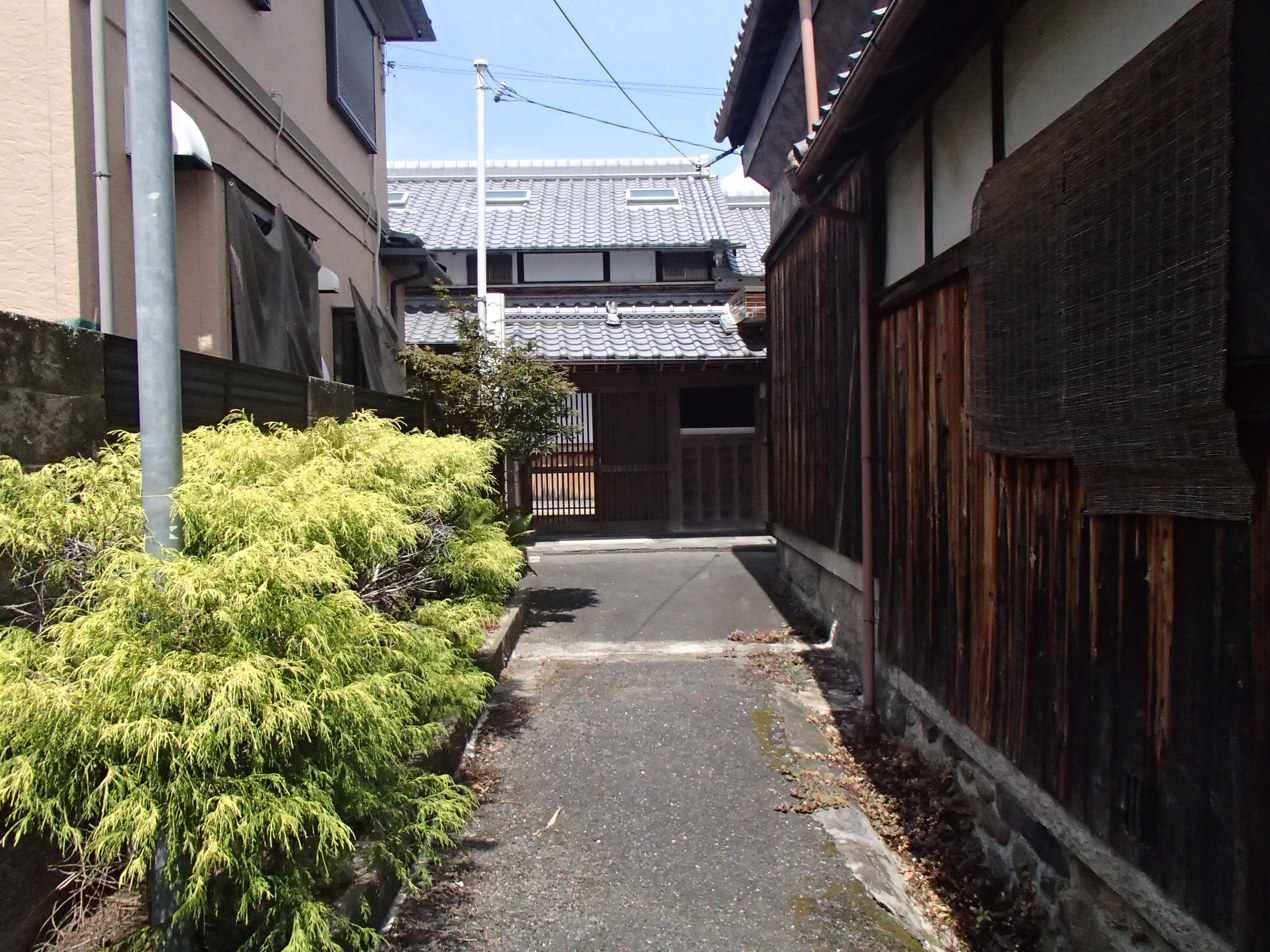
Milieda moat encircling settlement

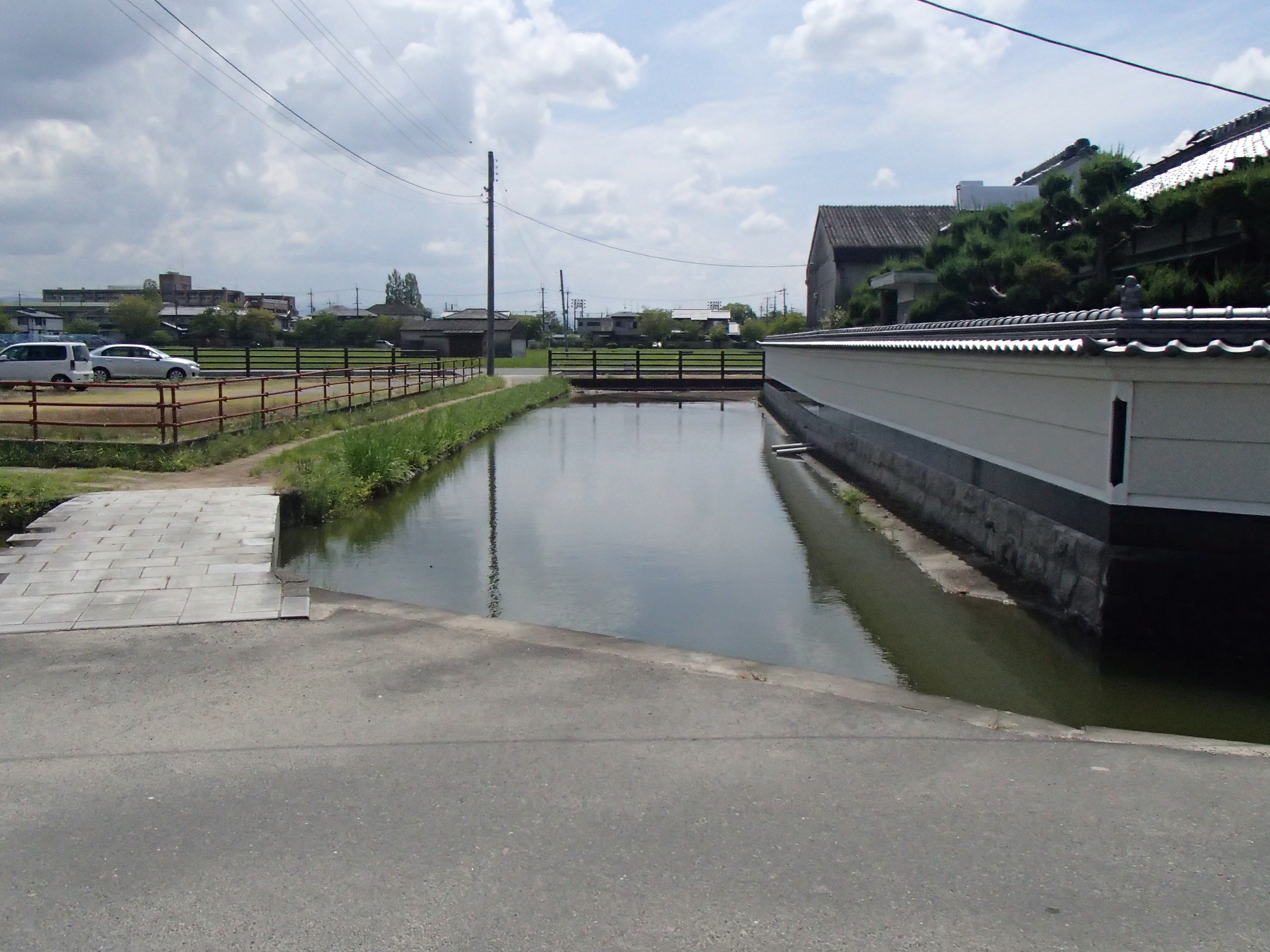
Milieda moat encircling settlement

Wakatsuki moat encircling settlements (Yamato Koriyama City, Nara Prefecture) and Hieda moat encircling settlement (Yamato Koriyama City, Nara Prefecture) are especially famous as historically important sites, and are also famous as tourist attractions because they are close to Koriyama Station and have parking lots in front of Uruta Shrine in the Hieda moat encircling settlement.

There appear to be many of them in Nara Prefecture, but this is simply because Nara Prefecture promotes moat encircling settlements as tourist attractions, and of course there are moat encircling settlements existing all over Japan.。Moat encircling settlements in Nara Prefecture have been clearly developed as tourist attractions with information boards, but many of the existing moat encircling settlements in Japan are not developed as tourist attractions, but are simply a group of private houses surrounded by waterways with narrow roads that cars cannot pass through and no parking lots. Many moat encircling settlements have been filled in as a result of urbanization, and there are many examples of unmarked, concrete-filled waterways in large cities that are actually remnants of ancient moat encircling settlements.

- Mie Prefecture
  - Ichimida Terauchi Town (Mie PrefectureTsu City)
  - Shiga Prefecture
  - Shimoishidera moated settlement (Shiga Prefecture Hikone City)
  - Shinkai-cho (Hikone City, Shiga Prefecture) - The site is believed to be the site of a flatland castle of the Shinkai clan, the development lord of the Shinkai area, which was used as a waterway for the village after the Shinkai clan was destroyed in 1558.
- Osaka Prefecture
  - Kyuhoji Terauchi-machi (Osaka PrefectureYao City)
  - Keikoji Terauchi-machi (Osaka PrefectureYao City)
  - Hiranogo moat encircling site (Osaka PrefectureOsaka CityHirano-ku) - The site has not retained its original form as a settlement and the moat encircling has been mostly filled in, but a portion has been preserved and maintained. The Hirano clan's shrine, Kakezu Shrine, and other structures are still in existence.
  - Kitsure moat encircling settlement (Osaka PrefectureOsaka CityHirano-ku) - The moat encircling the settlement was reclaimed in the 1960s and turned into a road. Six Jizoson (stone statues of Jizo) that were located at the entrance to the village are still in existence.
- Nara Prefecture
  - Milida moat encircling settlement (Nara Yamatokoriyama) - This is a valuable moat encircling settlement in that the features of a moat encircling settlement, such as the intricate roads in the settlement and the "Shichikyoku-ri", a demon gate, are completely extant. It is said to be the birthplace of Hieda Are, the compiler of Kojiki, and home to Uruta Shrine, which is dedicated to Hieda Are.
  - Wakatsuki moat encircling settlement (Nara Yamatokoriyama) - A valuable moat encircling settlement in that the date of its formation can be supported by data.
  - Banjo moat encircling settlement (Nara Yamatokoriyama City)
  - Takayasu moat encircling settlement (Nara Ikaruga Town)
  - Minami Yagyu moat encircling settlement (Tenri City, Nara Prefecture)
  - Takenouchi moat encircling settlement (Tenri City)
  - Kayao moat encircling settlement (Nara Tenri City)
  - Hozu moat encircling settlement (Nara Tawaramoto Town)
  - Nango moated encircling settlement (Hiroryo Town, Nara Prefecture)
  - Fujimori moated encircling settlement (Tamato Takada City, Nara Prefecture)
  - Imai moat encircling settlement (Kashihara City, Nara Prefecture)
  - Saga Prefecture
  - Naotori Moat Encircling Settlement Creek Park (Saga Prefecture Kanzaki City)

and others.

== See also ==
- Hill town
- Moot hill
- Castle, Drawbridge, City gate
