= Meta Shrine =

Shinto shrine in Hieda, Nara, Japan

Meta Shrine (賣太神社, Meta Jinja)
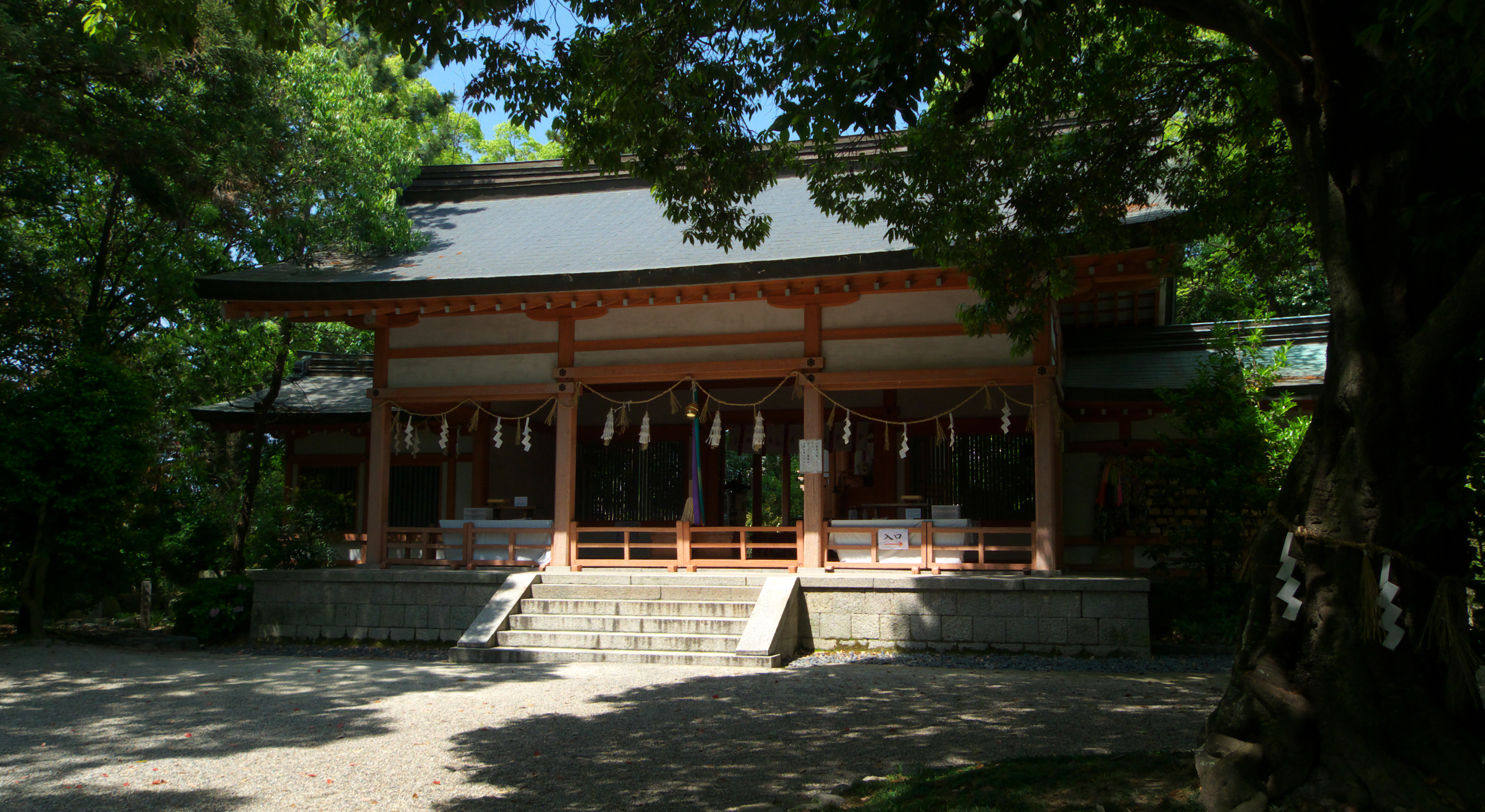
- The haiden of Meta Shrine

- Location within Japan

Religion
- Affiliation: Shinto

Location
- Coordinates: 34.6392°N 135.7961°E

Meta Shrine (賣太神社, Meta Jinja) is a Shinto shrine in Hieda, a moated village located in Yamatokōriyama in Nara Prefecture, Japan.

== Shrine ==
The main deity is Hieda no Are, who was involved in the compilation of the Kojiki, and Ame-no-Uzume-no-Mikoto and Sarutahiko Ōkami. Hieda no Are is the god of scholarship and storytelling.

== Festivals ==
The Hieda-No-Are festival takes place every year on May 5（Children's Day (Japan)） (Note: The festival has been held on August 16, but in consideration of the recent heat wave, the date was changed to May 5 starting in 2025.).

A Hieda-No-Are celebration was held on April 30, 2012, to mark the 1,300th anniversary of the compilation of the Kojiki.

== Facilities ==
- Kasuga Shrine
- Itsukushima Shrine
- Yabashira Shrine
- Storyteller Monument
