= Mount Hakkyō =

Mountain in the country of Japan

- 八経ヶ岳
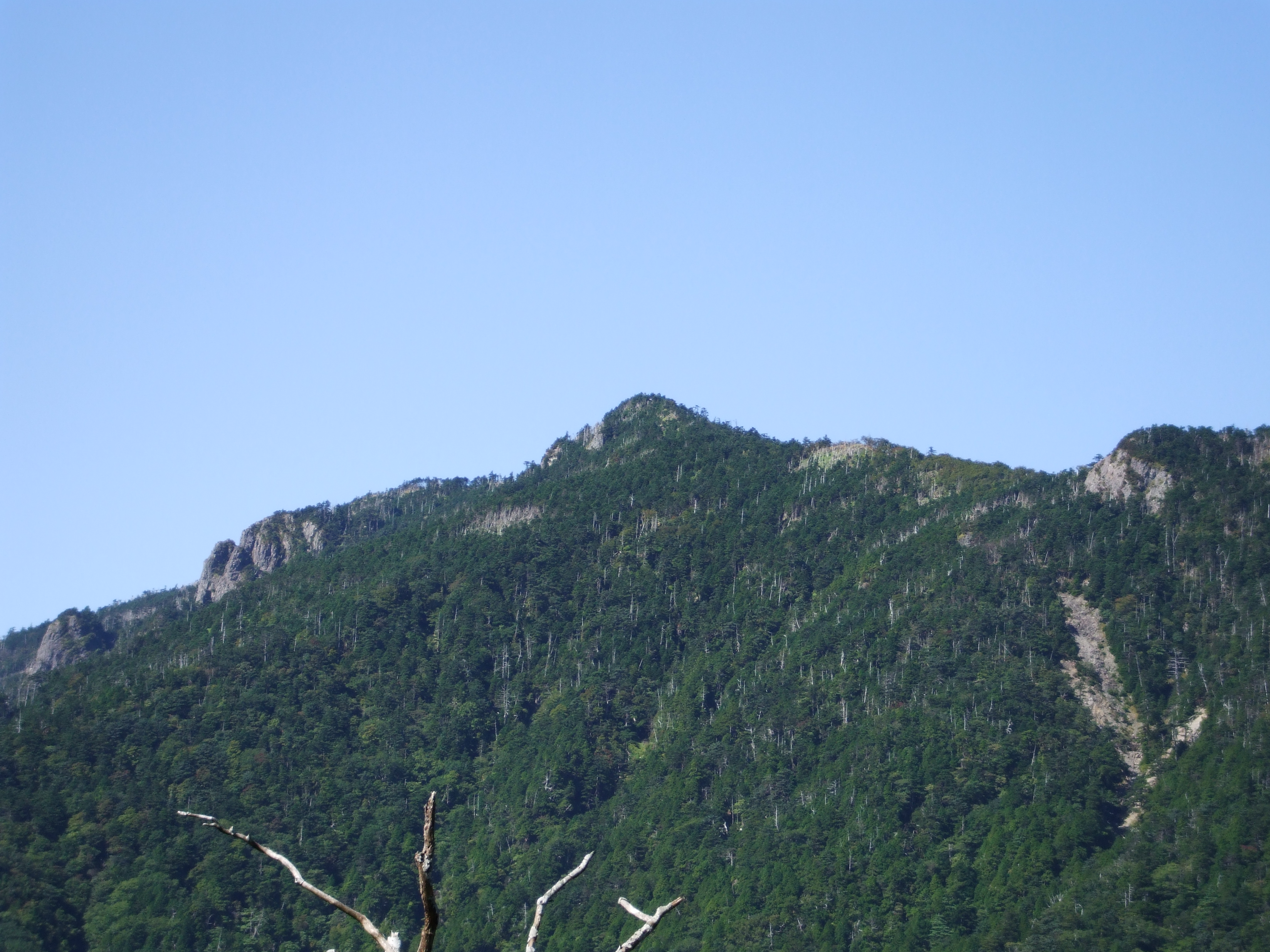
- Mount Hakkyō (September 2008)

Highest point
- Elevation: 1,914.6 m (6,281 ft)
- Prominence: 1,732 m (5,682 ft)
- Listing: Ultra, Ribu; List of mountains and hills of Japan by height
- Coordinates: 34°10′27″N 135°54′24″E

Naming
- Language of name: Japanese

Geography
- Location within Japan
- Location: Nara, Japan
- Parent range: Ōmine Mountains

Mount Hakkyō (八経ヶ岳, Hakkyō-ga-take) is a mountain within the Omine Mountains, which are located on the border of Tenkawa and Kamikitayama, Yoshino District, Nara Prefecture, Japan. At 1,914.6 m (6,281 ft), it's the tallest mountain in the in Nara Prefecture and Kansai region.

== Overview ==
In Japanese, ‘Hakkyō’, literally means ‘eight Buddhist scriptures’. This definition is derived from a legend about the believed founder of Shugendo, En no Gyōja, burying eight Buddhist scriptures on the top of the mountain. The mountain is also called Hakken-zan, literally ‘mountain of eight swords’ or Bukkyō-ga-take, also literally ‘mountain of Buddhist scriptures’. Sometimes, the mountain is mistaken for Mount Omine.

Multiple primeval forests on Mount Yatsugatake have been designated as national natural monuments and are registered as UNESCO World Heritage sites in the "Sacred Sites and Pilgrimage Routes in the Kii Mountain Range" (registered in July 2004) .

- Bukkyogatake Primeval Forest - a primeval forest including pure Abies veitchii forests and spruce forests (designated October 12, 1922 (Taisho 11))
- Sacred magnolia habitat (designated February 7, 1928 (Showa 3))

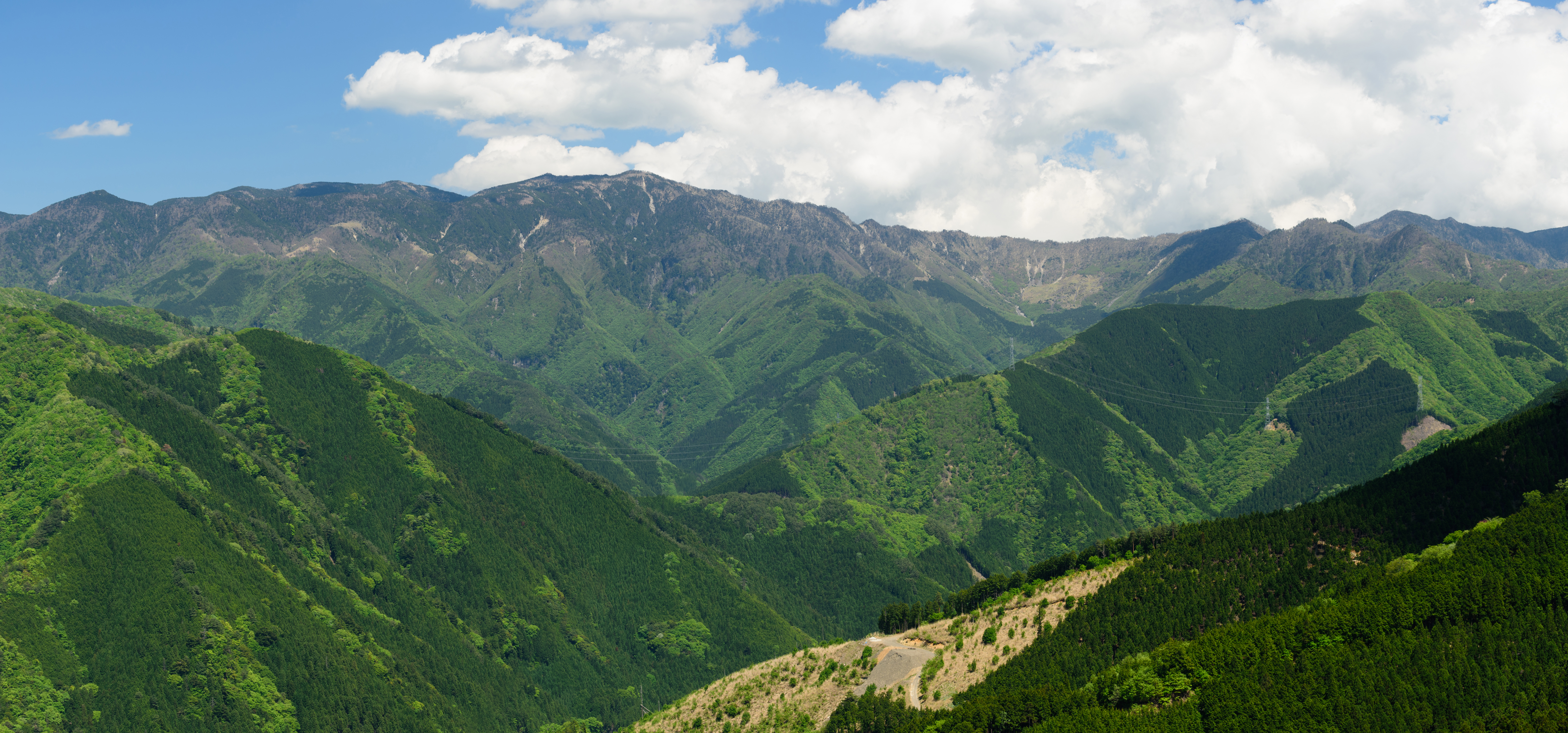
From left to right : Mount Chōsen, Mount Misen and Mount Hakkyō, Mount Myōjō, Mount Bussyō

== Routes ==
The mountain has several routes to the summit. The easiest is from Gyojamodori-Tunnel-Nishi-guchi, taking about three hours. The traditional route is from Tenkawa-Kawai, a seven-hour journey.

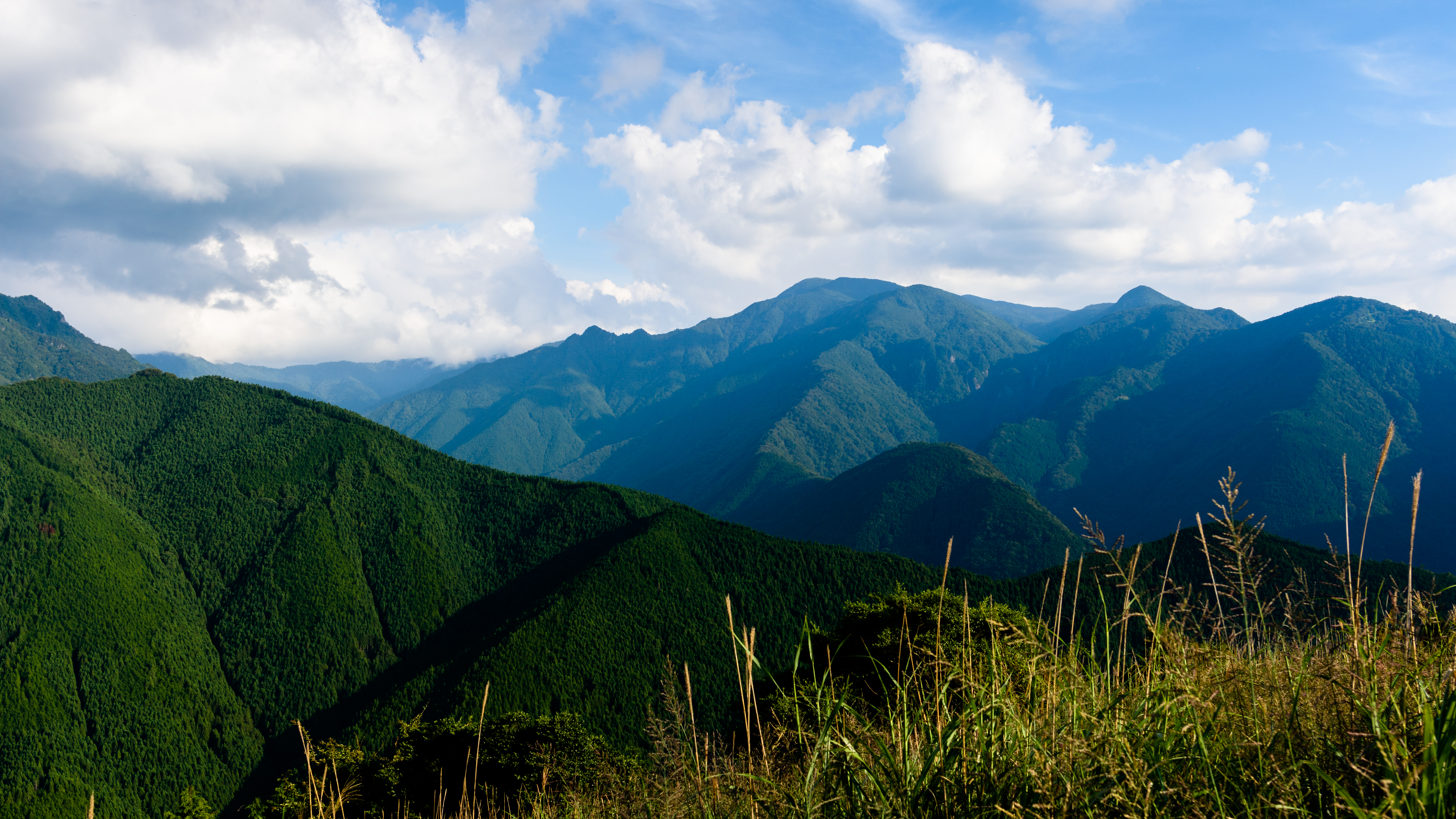
The right ridge line is the traditional route from Tenkawa-Kawai to Mount Misen and Mount Hakkyō.

== Reception ==
The mountain was listed in the book 100 Famous Japanese Mountains by Kyūya Fukada.

== In popular culture ==
- The mountain appeared in Assassin's Creed Shadows.

== Gallery ==
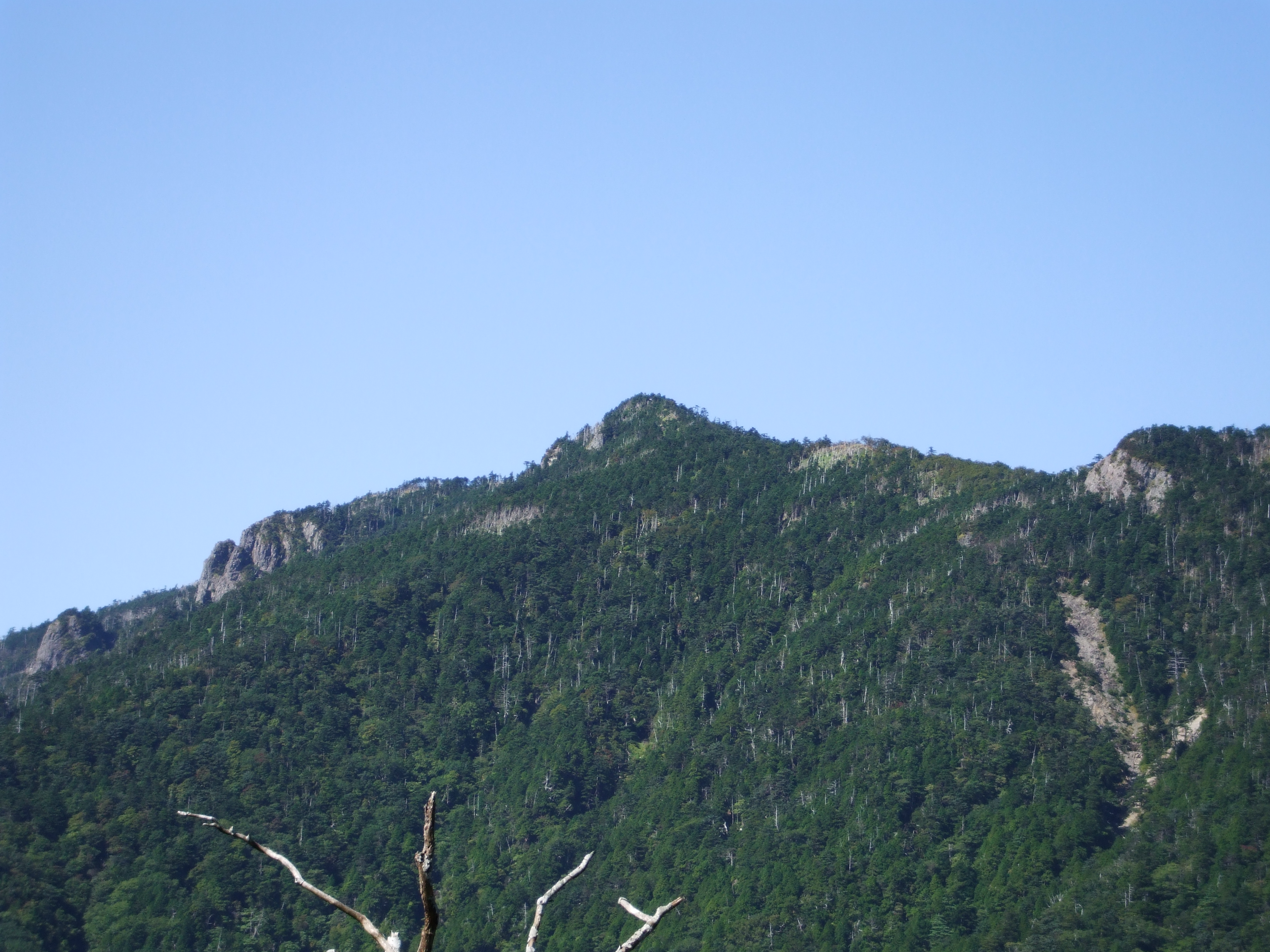
Mount Hakkyō from south

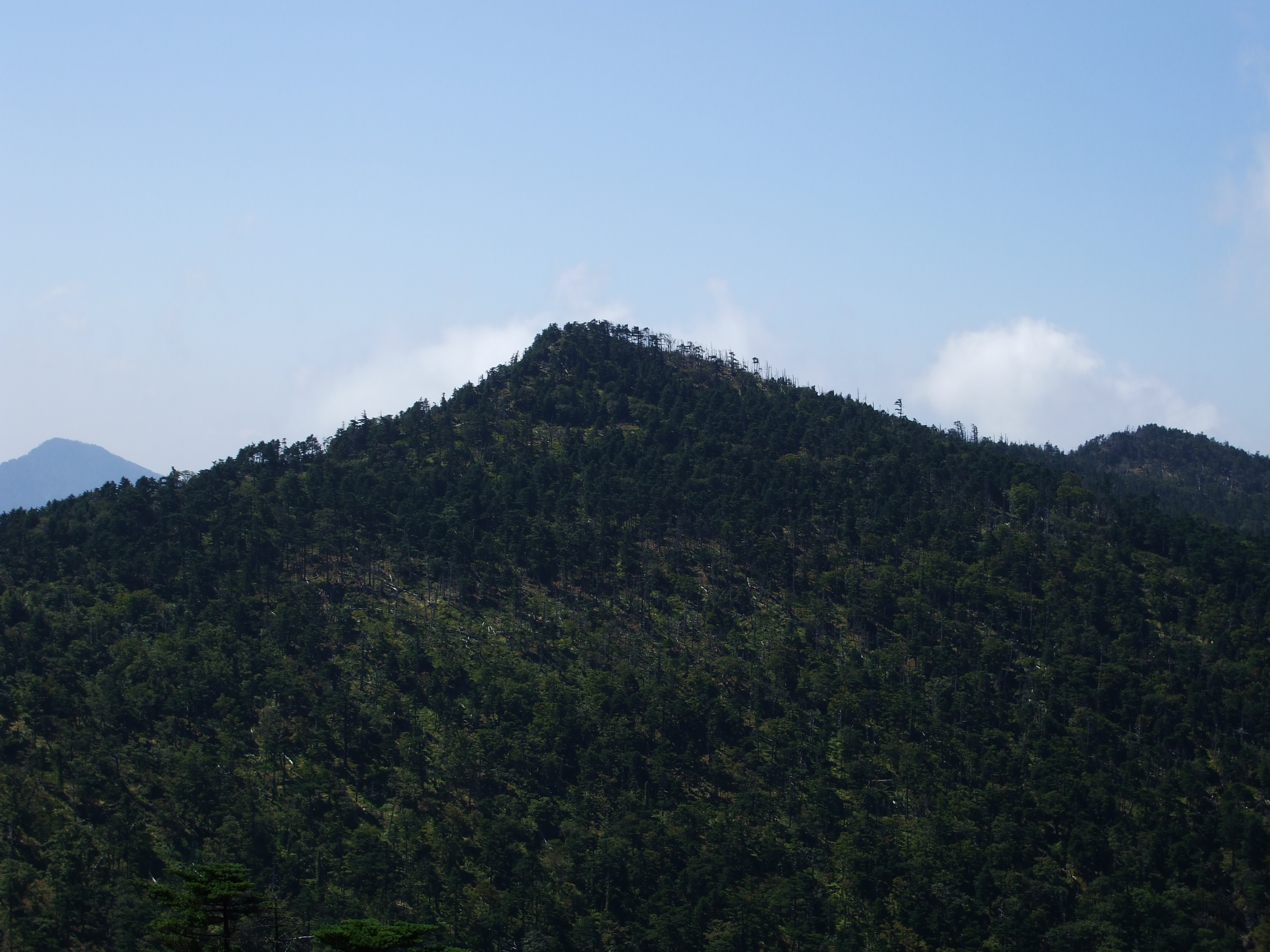
Mount Hakkyō from Mount Misen (Nara)

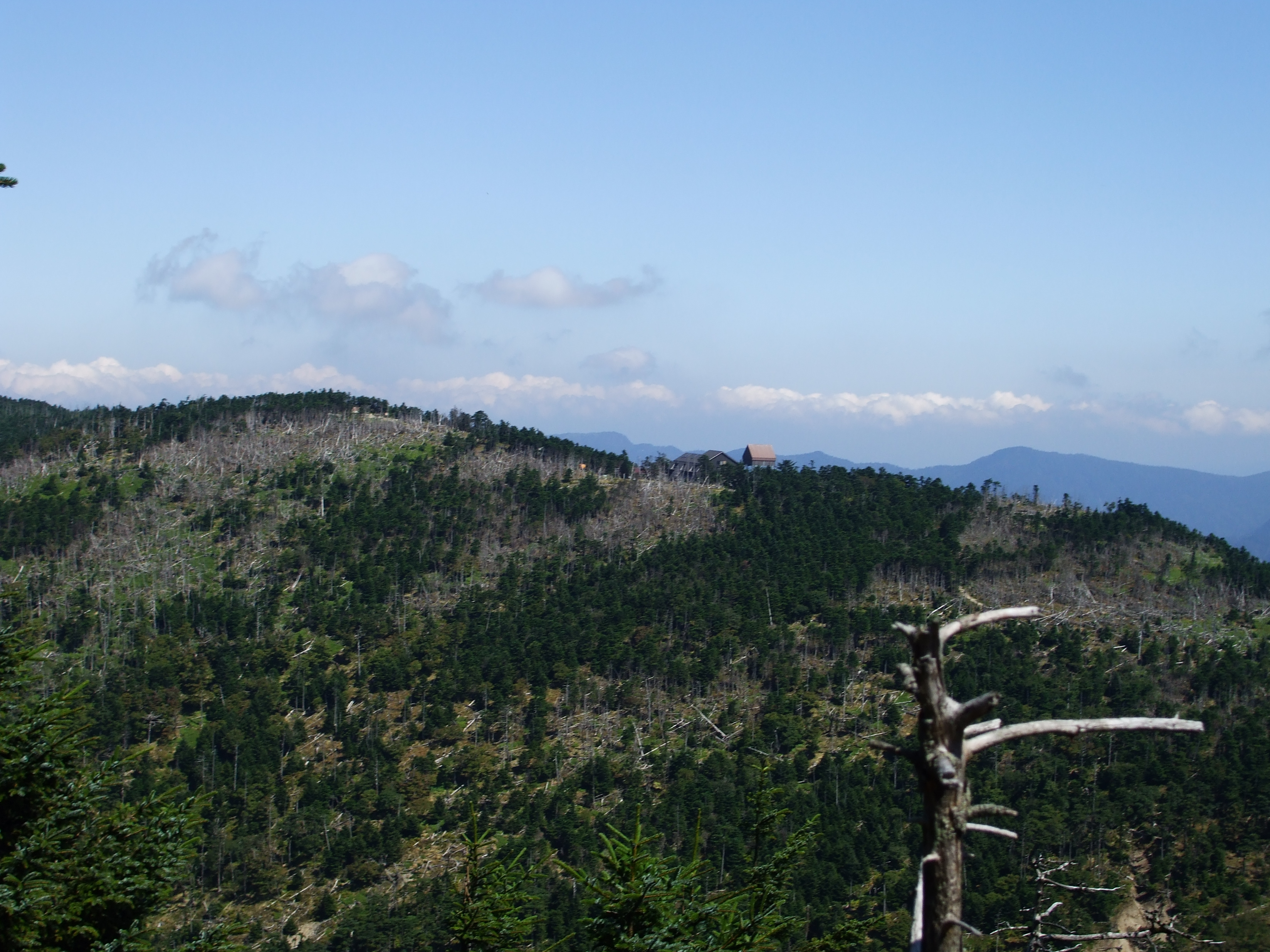
Mount Misen and Mount Daifugen from Mount Hakkyō

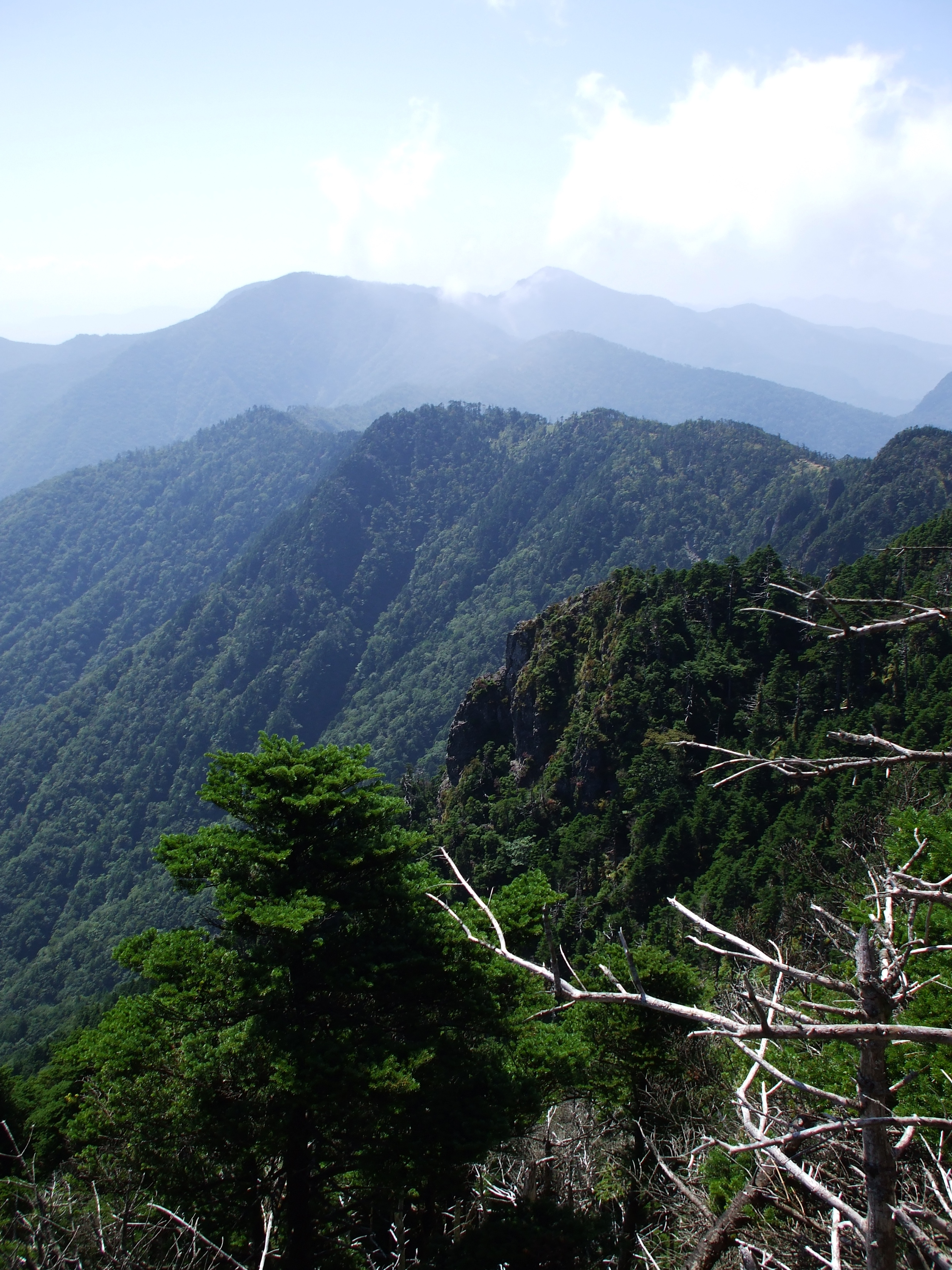
Mount Shaka from Mount Hakkyō

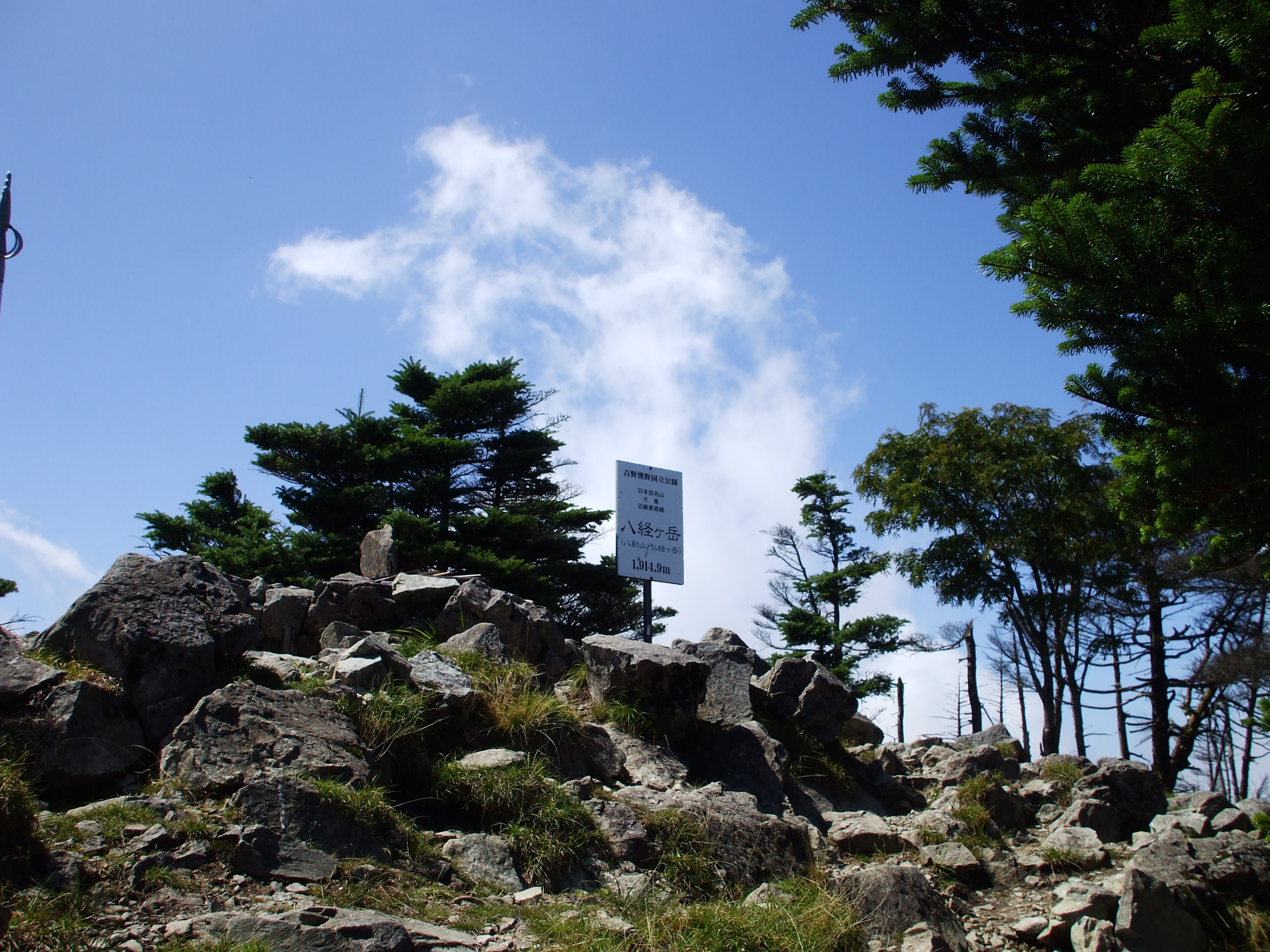
Top of Mount Hakkyō

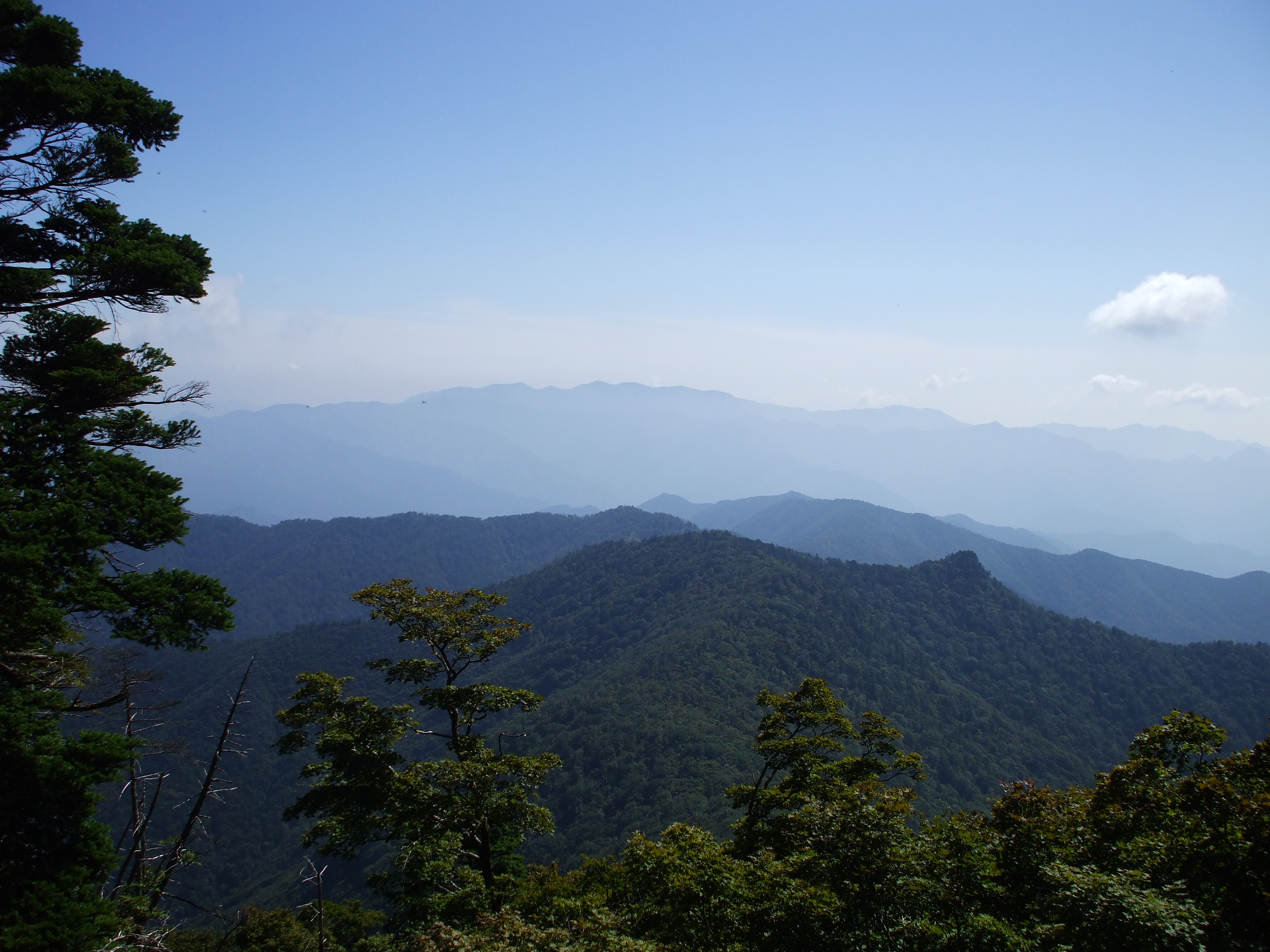
Mount Ōdaigahara from Mount Hakkyō

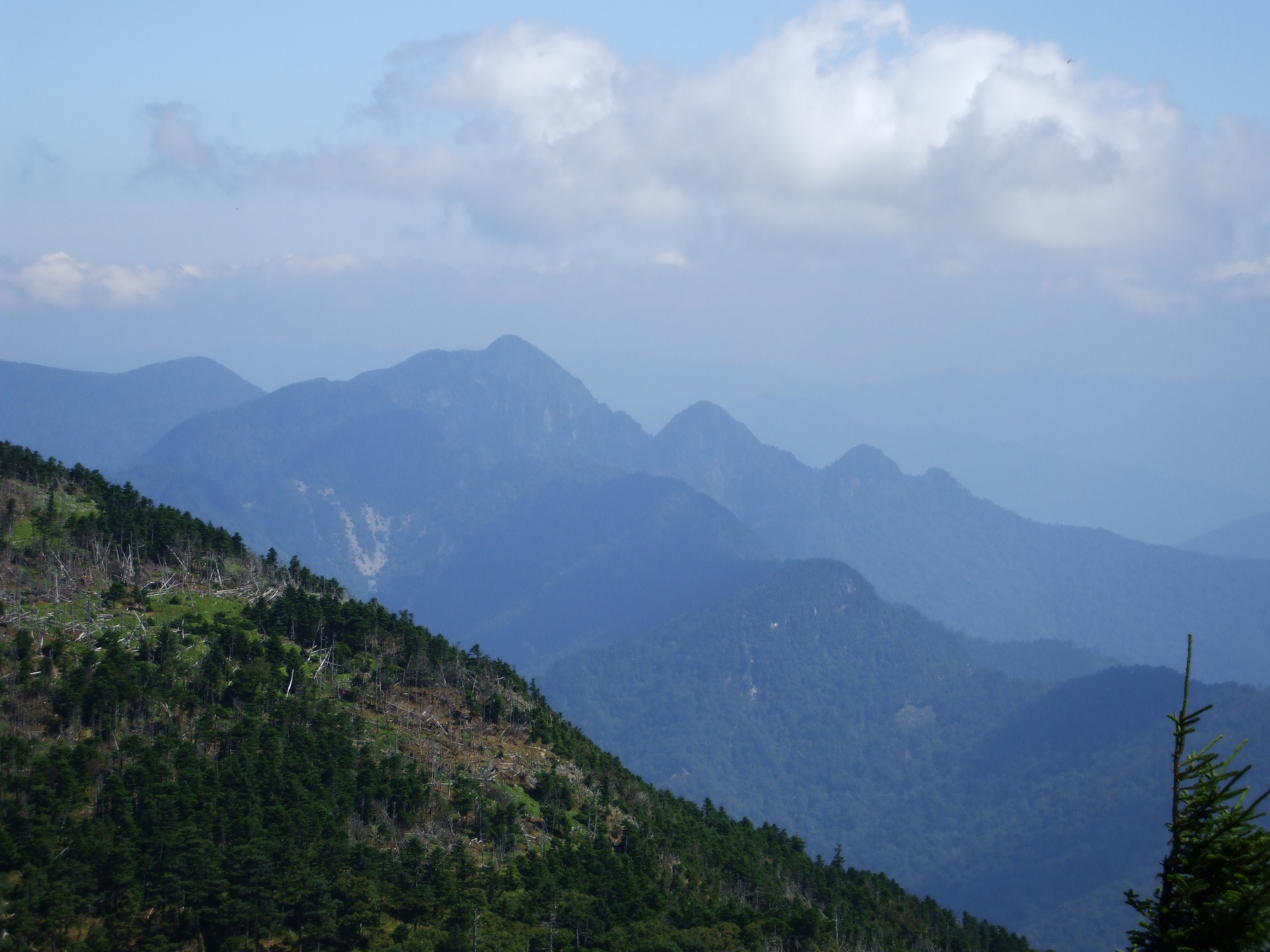
Mount Daifugen from Mount Hakkyō

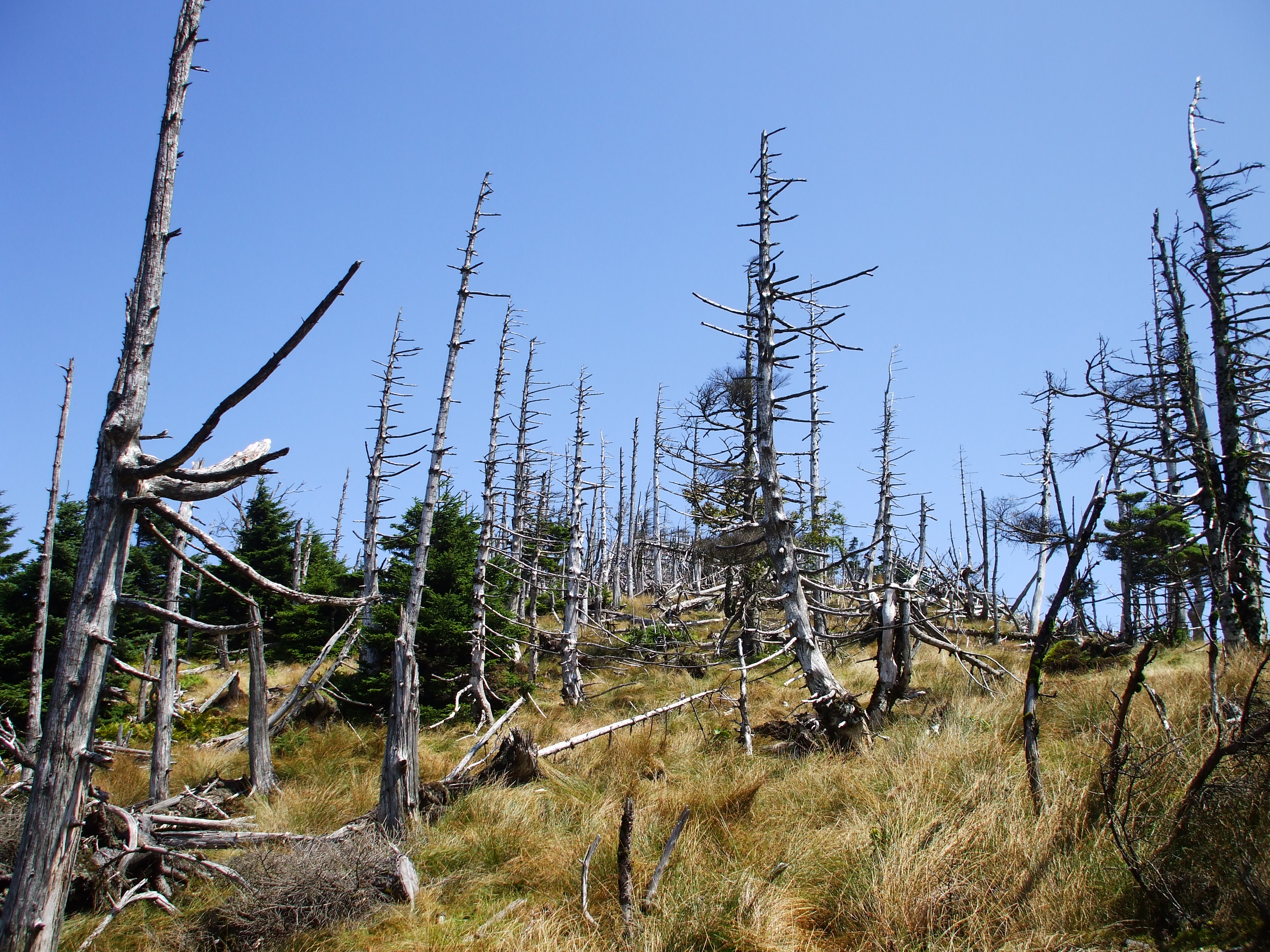
At the top of Mount Hakkyō

== Sources ==
- Official Home Page of the Geographical Survey Institute in Japan
- Omine, Daitaka, Odaigahara
