= Ōminesan-ji =

Shugendō temple in Tenkawa, Kansai Region, Japan

Ōminesan-ji 大峯山寺
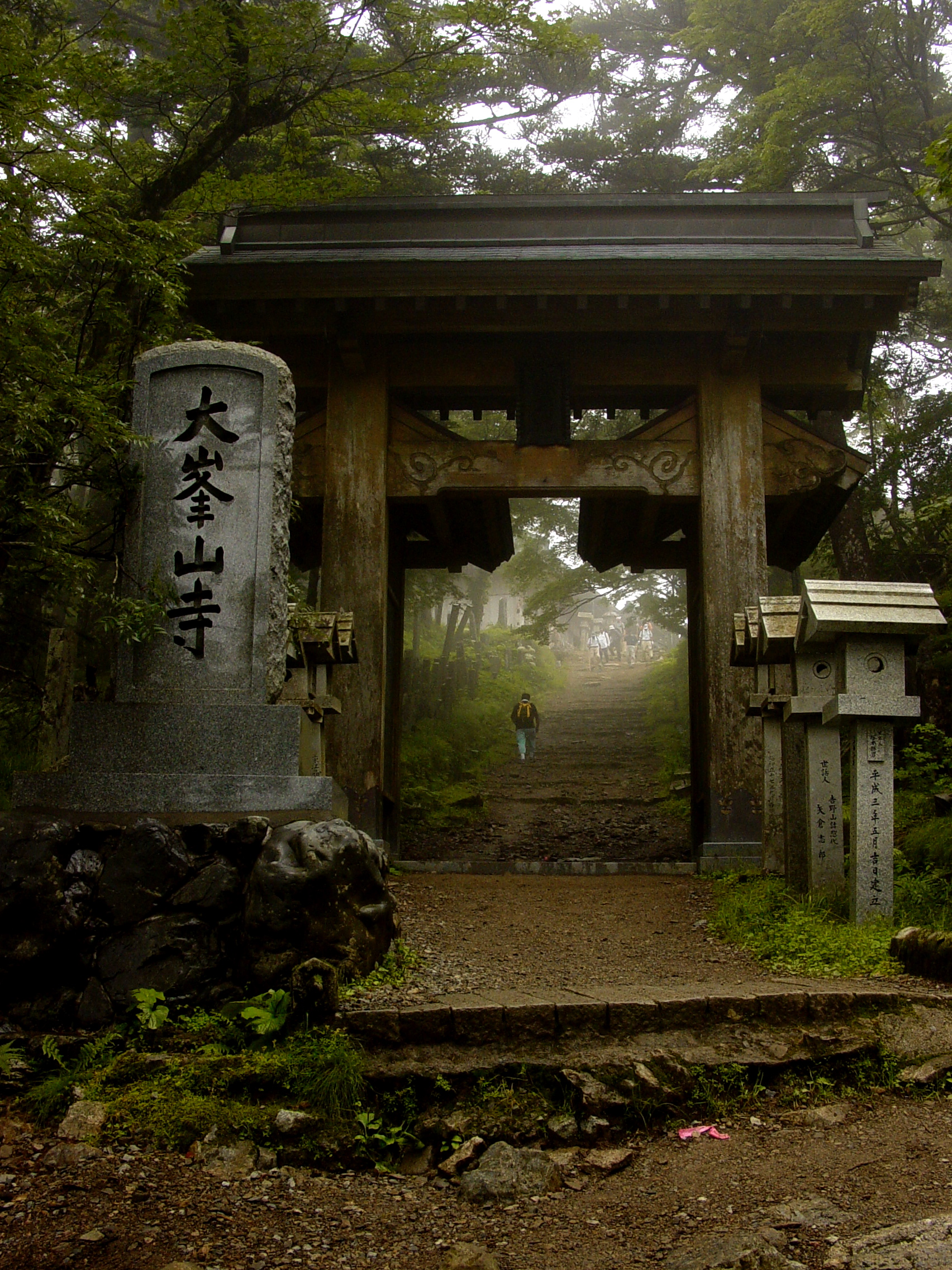
- Stairs on the way to Ōminesan-ji

- Location within Nara Prefecture Location within Japan

Religion
- Affiliation: Buddhist
- Deity: Zaō-gongen
- Rite: Shugendō

Location
- Location: Ōmine-san, Tenkawa-mura Yoshino-gun, Nara Prefecture
- Country: Japan
- Interactive map of Ōminesan-ji 大峯山寺
- Coordinates: 34°15′11″N 135°56′29″E

Architecture
- Founder: En no Gyōja
- Completed: Second half of 7th century
- UNESCO World Heritage Site
- Type: Cultural
- Criteria: ii,iii, iv, vi
- Designated: 2004
- Reference no.: 1142bis-001

Ōminesan-ji (大峯山寺, Ōminesan-ji) is an important temple of the Shugendō religion in the village of Tenkawa, Yoshino district, Nara prefecture, Japan. It is located at the Sanjōgatake peak of Mount Ōmine. Along with Kinpusen-ji, it is considered the most important temple in Shugendō. From the early Heian period to the present, women have been prohibited from entering the sacred mountain. The precincts were designated a National Historic Site of Japan in 2002.

== Overview ==
According to tradition, the temple was established in at the end of the 7th century by En no Gyōja, the founder of Shugendō, a form of mountain asceticism drawing from Buddhist and Shinto beliefs. The main hall is located near the summit of Sanjōgatake (1719.2 meters), located in the middle of the Ōmine Mountain Range, and enshrines Zaō Gongen. While the main hall (Zaō-dō) of Kinpusen-ji on Mount Yoshino is called "Sange no Zaō-dō," the main hall of Ōminesan-ji is called "Yamagami no Zaō-dō." The two Zaō-dō temples on the mountain and at the bottom of the mountain are more than 20 kilometers apart, and are now separate temples, but originally they were part of a single Shugendō temple called "Kinpusen-ji." It was only in modern times that they were separated.

"Kinpusen-san" and "Ōmine-san" do not refer to individual peaks, but to the mountains as a place of faith and training. "Kinpusen-san" refers to the entire sacred mountain area from Mount Yoshino to Sanjōgatake, and the group of temples scattered there was collectively called "Kinpusen-ji." On the other hand, "Ōminesan" is a general term for the mountains of the Ōmine mountain range, including Mt. Daifugen, Mt. Misen, Mt. Hakkyogatake, and Mt. Shakagatake. The 80-kilometer road from Mt. Yoshino through the Ōmine mountain range to Kumano Hongū Taisha in Tanabe, Wakayama is called the "Ōmine Okugake Trail" and is a training route for ascetic monks.

Much of the early history of Ōminesan-ji is unclear. In the Tenpyō era (729-749), Gyōki is said to have carried out a major renovation, and by some legends say built Kinpusen-ji at the foot of the mountain as the Zaō-dō Hall at the top of Ōminesan was difficult to access. Although they went into decline in the early Heian period, it was revived by the Shingon Buddhist monk Shōbō (Rigen Daishi) at the end of the 9th century, and since the 10th century, it has been visited by many members of the imperial family and aristocrats. Fujiwara no Michinaga offered sutras in a gilt bronze container in Heian period buried in a mound near the mountain top, which was excavated and designated a National Treasure in August 11, 2007 During the Sengoku period, the main hall was burned down in a conflict with the Ikko sect, but it was rebuilt in the Edo period. In 1614, Tokugawa Ieyasu ordered Tenkai, a Tendai Buddhist monk (the founder of Kan'ei-ji in Edo and other temples), to become head of Kinpusen-ji and Ōminesan-ji. After the Meiji restoration, the Shinbutsu Bunri abolished the syncretic Shinto-Buddhist beliefs that had been practiced throughout the country for many centuries, and Shugendō was officially suppressed. From 1871, the Meiji government declared Kinpusen-ji and Ōminesan-ji to be a Shinto shrine. In 1886, the Kinpusen-ji and Ōminesan-ji reverted to Buddhism, and the two locations were separated into Kinpusen-ji at the foot of the mountains and Ōminesan-ji at the top. In 2004, Ōminesan-ji was designated as part of a UNESCO World Heritage Site under the name Sacred Sites and Pilgrimage Routes in the Kii Mountain Range.

== Precincts ==
There is a ridge path from Mount Yoshino to the main hall of Ōminesan-ji, but general worshippers climb Sanjōgatake from Dorogawa in Tenkawa Village at the foot of the mountain. It takes about four hours on foot from Dorogawa. Even from the trailhead, Ōmine Ōhashi Bridge, it takes about three hours to climb one way. The sanctuary around the Sanjōgatake peak (山上ヶ岳) has long been considered sacred in Shugendō, and women are not allowed in the area beyond four "gates" on the route to the peak. On the neighboring Inamuragatake peak (稲村ヶ岳), altitude 1,726 m, it has been opened as a place of training for female believers since 1959, thus called "Women's Ōmine" (女人大峯, Nyonin Ōmine).The mountain trail from Ōmine Ōhashi Bridge to the main hall of Ōminesan-ji is well-maintained, and several teahouses have been set up along the way. A short distance from Ōmine OŌhashi Bridge, past the ruins of Ichinose Teahouse and Ipponmatsu Teahouse, is a water source called "En no Gyoja Osuke Mizu." Further on is Dorotsuji Teahouse, where the trail joins with the Ōmine Ōkugake Trail from Mount Yoshino. Further ahead are two teahouses called Daranisuke Teahouse, built by a pharmacy at the foot of the mountain (which manufactures and sells a medicine called "Daranisukemaru"). All of the teahouses are built to cover the mountain trail, so it is always necessary to pass through the buildings. Beyond that are difficult chain sections (ascetic practice areas) called "Abura Koboshi," "Kanekakeiwa," and "Nishi no Nozoki." The most famous of these is the "Nishi no Nozoki" practice area, where pilgrims lean over the edge of a cliff with a safety rope. There are safe detours at all difficult sections. Behind the main hall is the "Ura no Gyojo," where pilgrims train without safety ropes on a cliff without chains. At Nishi no Nozoki, safety ropes are held by a guide, and entry to the Ura practice area is prohibited without the guidance of a guide.

== Cultural properties ==
=== Important Cultural Properties ===
- Main Hall (Zaō-dō) - Rebuilt in 1691. It is a hipped-gabled building measuring approximately 23 x 19 meters and 13 meters high. Copper tiles and copper sheet roofing. The inner sanctuary was built in 1691, but the outer sanctuary was expanded in 1706.

== See also ==
- Sacred Sites and Pilgrimage Routes in the Kii Mountain Range
- Shugendō
- List of Historic Sites of Japan (Nara)
