= Shugendō =

Syncretic religion from Heian Japan

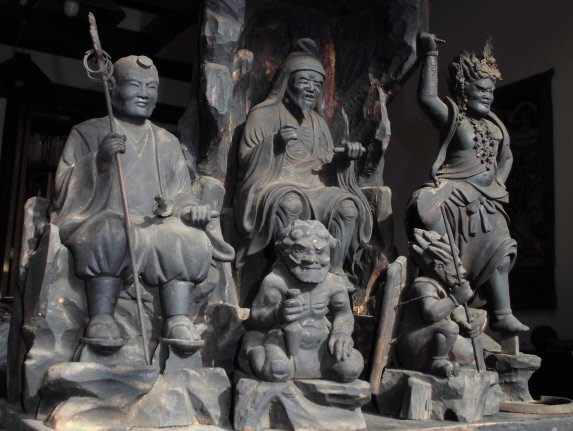
Some of the primary figures of Shugendo practice and worship. En no Gyoja, Rigen Daishi, Zao Gongen, and two oni named Zenki and Goki.

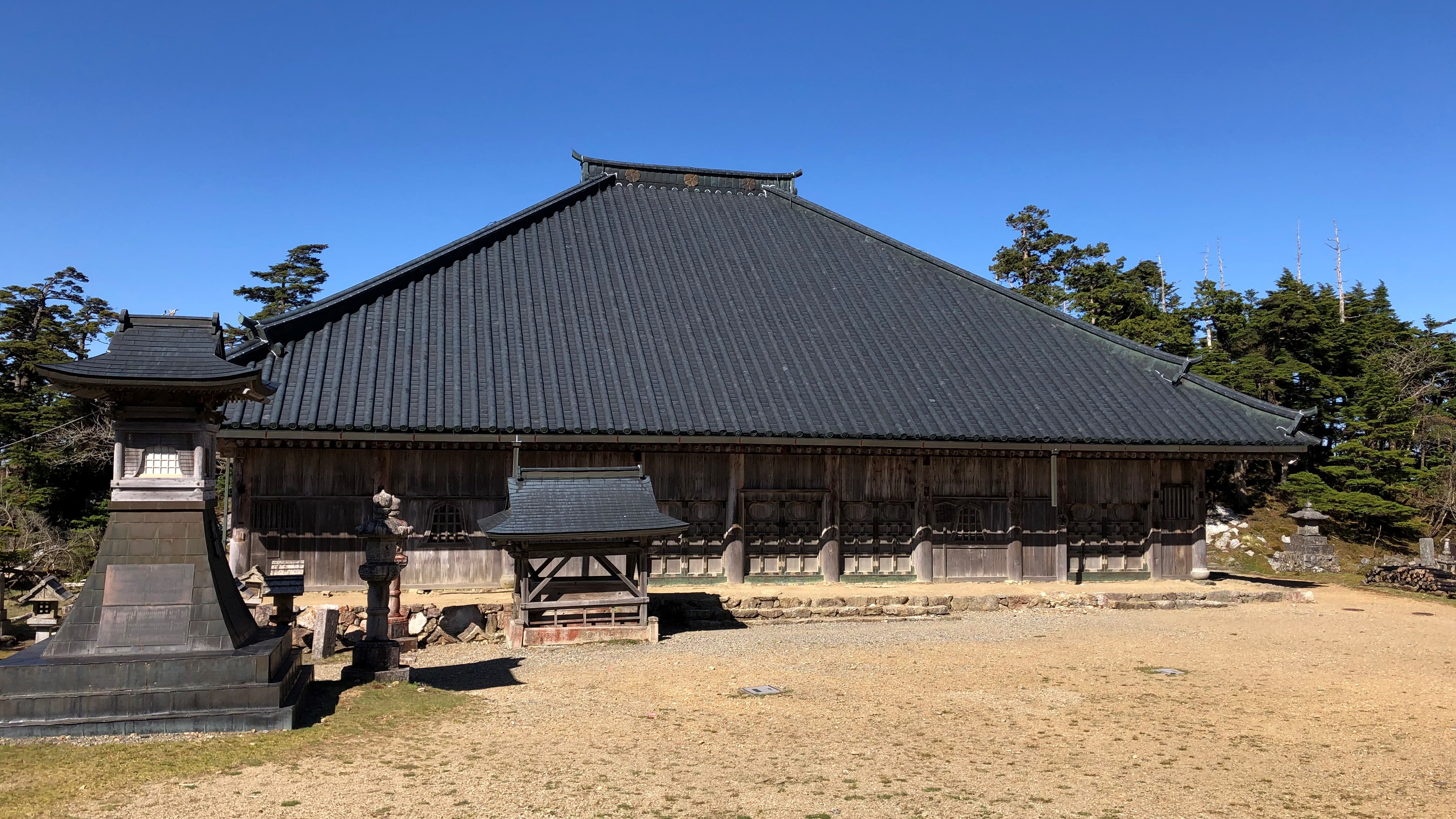
Ōminesan-ji a non-denominational holy site of Shugendō

Shugendō (修験道, lit. 'the "Way [of] Trial [and] Practice", the "Way of Shugen, or Gen-practice"') is an Esoteric Buddhist religion, associated with a body of ascetic practices that originated in the Nara Period of Japan having evolved during the 7th century from beliefs, philosophies, doctrine and ritual systems drawn from Esoteric Buddhism, but more minorly the utilization of folk-religion, Shinto, mountain worship, and Taoism to various degrees depending on the sect. A distinction is often made between institutional Shugendo lineages with codified education and practice lineages principally associated with various Shingon and Tendai Buddhist lineages who controlled entrance of various sacred mountain sites of maintained practice and study. While numerous forms of local religious and mountain traditions from the kamakura period forward are sometimes attributed to Shugendo via use of its tools, rites, and vocabulary, this is debated by scholars.

The goal of Shugendō is for practitioners to conduct religious training while treading through steep mountain ranges with the intention of cultivating great compassion and Siddhi to alleviate the suffering of the practitioner and all beings. Practitioners are called Shugenja (修験者) or Yamabushi (山伏, lit. '"Mountain Prostrator"'). The mountains where Shugendō is practiced are all over Japan, and can span multiple mountains within one range such as the Ōmine mountain range with Mount Hakkyō and Mount Ōmine or the Ishizuchisan mountain range with Kamegamori (瓶ヶ森) and Tengudake.

== History ==
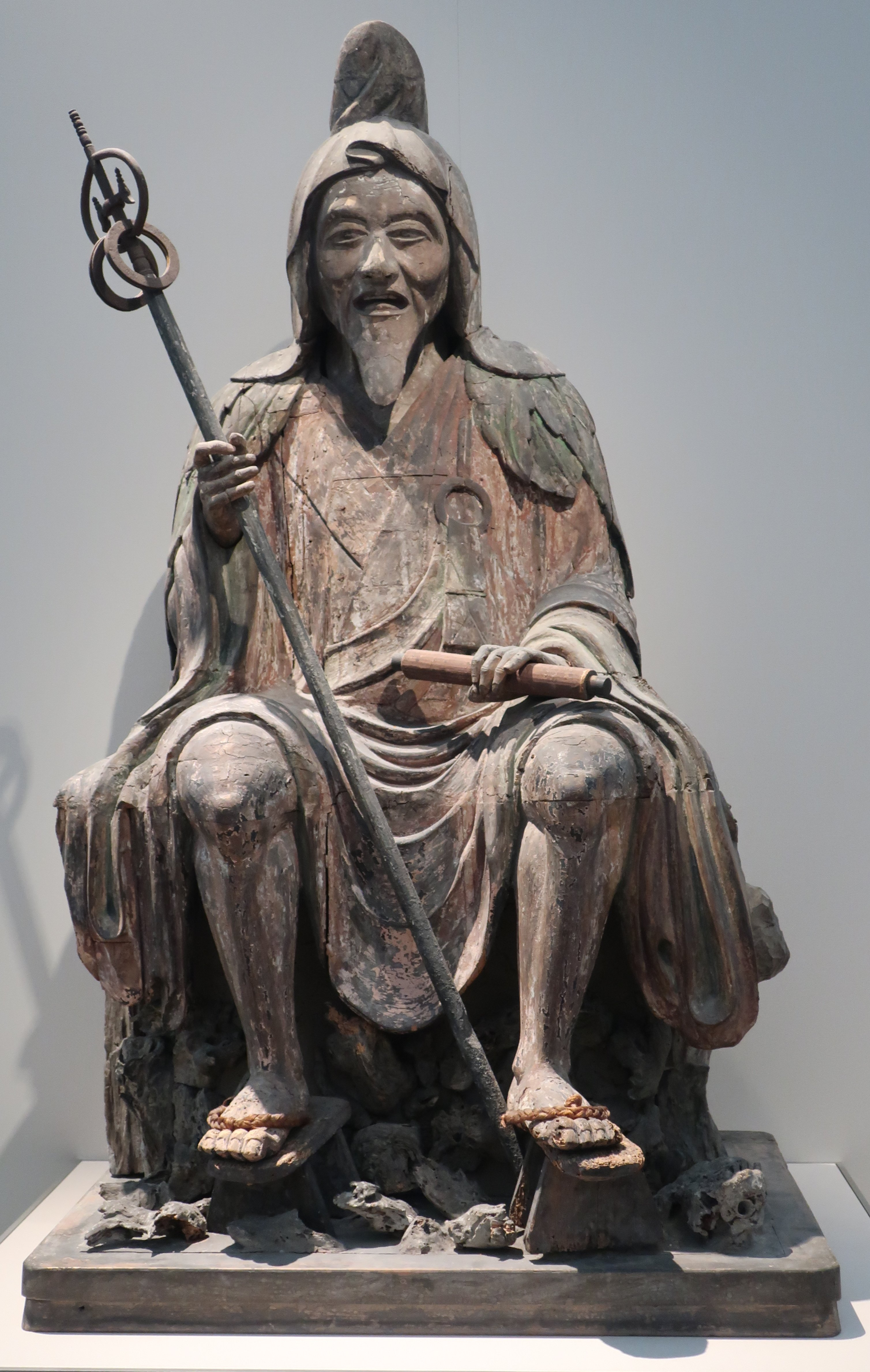
English: En no Gyōja, Japan, Kamakura period, c. 1300–1375, polychromed wood, Kimbell Art Museum

Shugendō evolved during the seventh century from an amalgamation of beliefs, philosophies, doctrines and ritual systems drawn from local folk-religious practices, Shinto mountain worship and Buddhism. The seventh-century ascetic and mystic En no Gyōja is considered as the patriarch of Shugendō, having first practice what would later be referred to as Shugendō as doctrine and practice. Shugendō literally means "the path of training and testing" or "the way to spiritual power through discipline."

From the ninth century, elements of Esoteric Buddhism such as Shingon and Tendai Buddhism were taken into Shugendō and it developed further. In the Heian period, it became very popular among the nobles living in Kyoto to visit Kumano Sanzan (three major shrines, Kumano Hongū Taisha, Kumano Hayatama Taisha and Kumano Nachi Taisha), which was the common holy place of Shugendō, Shinto and Buddhism.

In 1613, the Tokugawa authorities issued the Shugendo Hatto (修験道法度) and actively regulated the various independent and unique lineage streams throughout Japan, enforcing them to either affiliate with the Shingon affiliated Tozan ha and Tendai affiliated Honzan ha organizations. It would not be until the post World War II religious freedoms act when many of these lineages could become independent again.

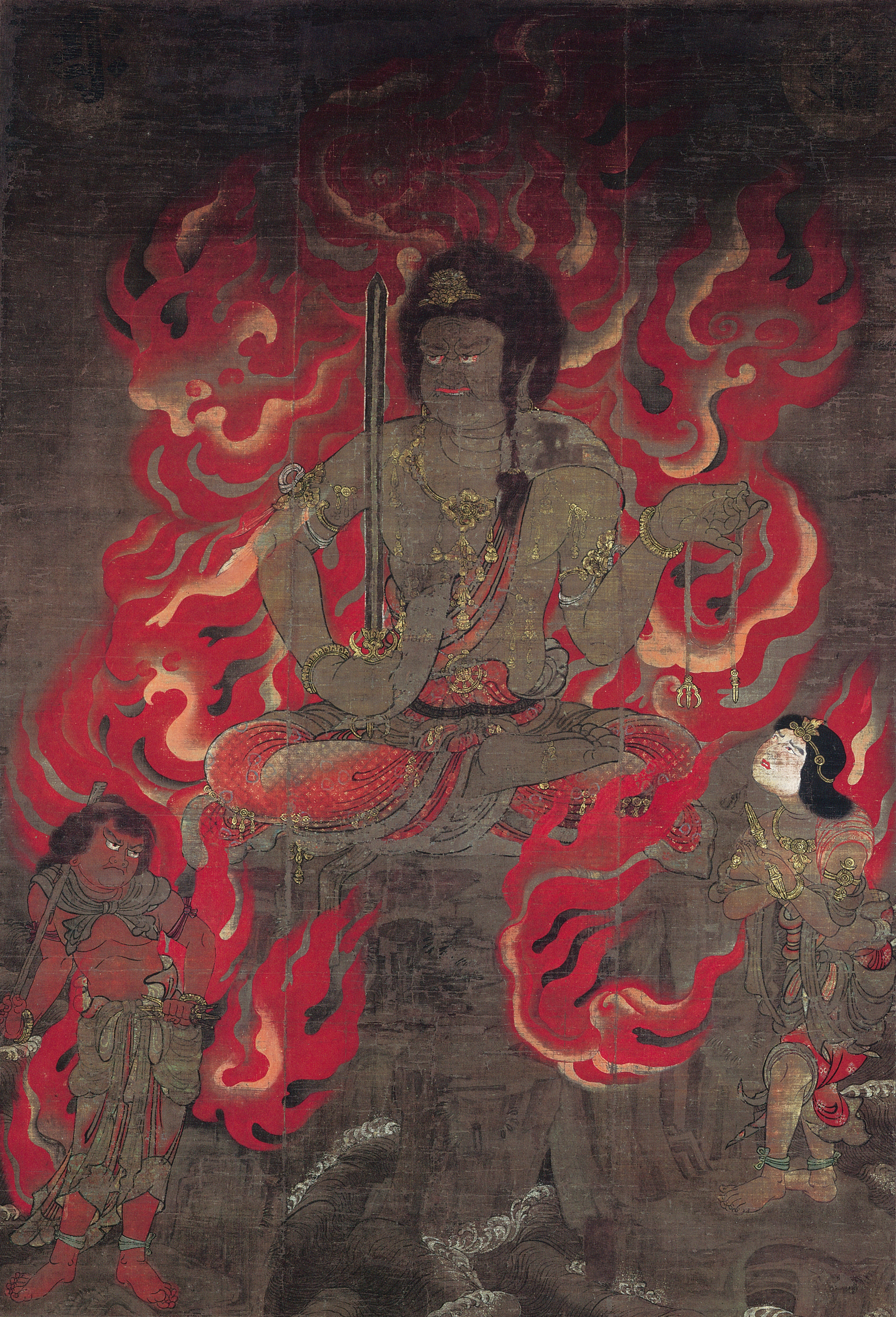
Fudō Myōō silk scroll from Daigo-ji (Kyoto)

The Meiji government, which erected a barrier between Shinto and Buddhism, ruled that Shugendō was unacceptable because of its amalgamation of the two religions, and officially forbade it in 1872. With the advent of religious freedom in Japan after World War II, Shugendō was revived.

In 1907, Yoshitaro Shibasaki and his team successfully climbed Mount Tsurugi, which was regarded as the last unclimbed mountain in Japan. However, they found a metal cane decoration and a sword on the top of the mountain, and it turned out that someone had reached the top before them. A later scientific investigation revealed that the metal cane decoration and sword dated from the late Nara period to the early Heian period and that shugenja had climbed Mount Tsurugi more than 1,000 years ago.

The Ōmine mountain range, which stretches 100 km from north to south and connects Yoshino and Kumano, was historically one of the biggest practice places of Shugendō. The highest peak of the Ōmine mountain range is Mount Hakkyō at an altitude of 1915 m, and there are 75 places for ascetic practices along the mountain trail, and Ōminesan-ji Temple at the top of Mount Ōmine at an altitude of 1719 m is considered to be the highest sacred site of Shugendō. At present, the Ōmine mountain range is designated as a UNESCO World Heritage Site "Sacred Sites and Pilgrimage Routes in the Kii Mountain Range" and Yoshino-Kumano National Park.

== Buddhist institutions and lineages ==
Shugendō developed in the medieval period through networks of Shingon and Tendai acharyas, lay practitioners, and mountain communities. By the medieval and early modern periods, several important centers had developed distinct lineages.

Shōgo-in of the Honzan Shugen-shū sect, located in Kyoto, became an important institutional center of Shugendō, and during the Shugendō Hatto was designated as the principal center of the Tendai-aligned Honzan-ha tradition. Its authority was solidified through networks of ordained and lay pilgrimage groups throughout Japan.

Kinpusen-ji of the Kinpusen Shugen Honshū sect is one of the major institutions centered on the Mount Ōmine-based tradition. Due to events throughout the history of Shugendō, it has had associations with Shingon- and Tendai-based institutions at separate times, but became independent with the religious freedoms act in 1948.

Sanbō-in is a sub-temple of Daigo-ji, the head temple of the Daigo-ha Shingon Sect. During the Shugendō Hatto, Sanbō-in was designated as the principal center of the Shingon-aligned Tōzan-ha tradition. Centered on the Mount Ōmine-based tradition, it is a dual center of Shingon and Shugendō faith and practice.

Gokuraku-ji of the Ishizuchisan Shingon sect is a tradition centered on Mt. Ishizuchi and the study of Shingon Buddhism and Shugendō. After enduring the various government orders which brought them under various institutions, in 1954, with the religious freedoms act, they could return to being an independent institution.

Mount Hiko in northern Kyushu is a decentralized spiritual center of Shugendō, not originally aligned with any particular Buddhist lineage, nor subordinate to the Honzan or Tōzan traditions. During the Edo period, it had substantial networks of lay supporters and pilgrimage associations. Institutional education is done according to many different streams at different temples and shrines in the area.

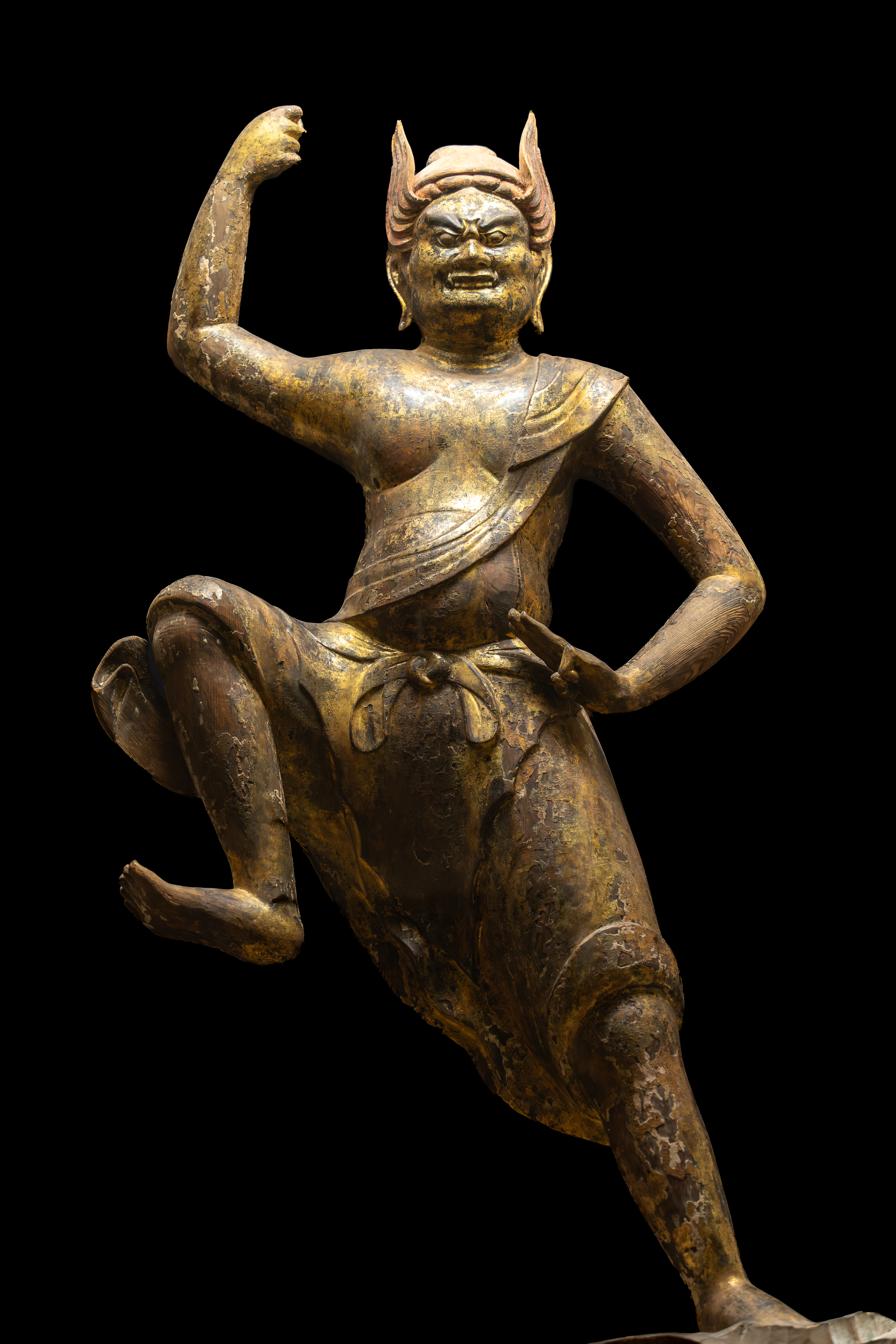
Zaō Gongen as depicted in the Omine centered traditions

== Zaō Gongen ==
Gongen (権現) refers to a manifestation appearing in the form of a local deity, in some cases as Buddhist figures, and in others as Japanese kami. The medieval Japanese doctrine known as honji suijaku explained that Buddhist deities could take various appearances in order to guide people according to specific circumstances. Gongen worship thus became an important faculty for the religious interaction between Buddhist and Shinto institutions and local indigenous religious traditions. This allowed for sacred geographical sites such as mountains, springs, and caves to be associated with Buddhist deities as temporal expressions. There are numerous Gongen throughout Japan, with Zaō Gongen (蔵王権現) being one of the most prominent and unique to Shugendō.

=== Kongō Zaō Gongen (金剛蔵王権現) ===
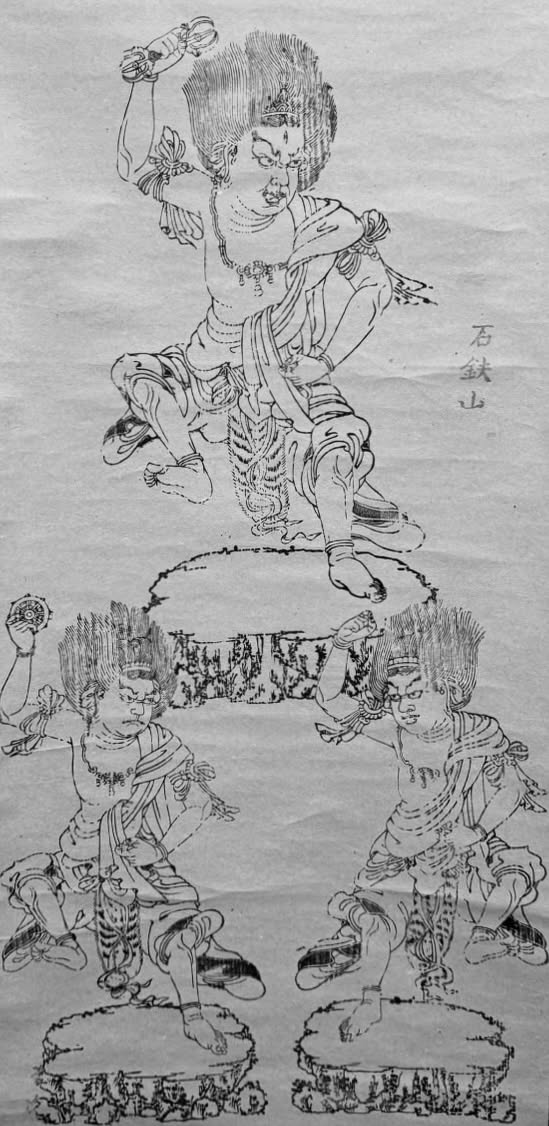
The threefold Zaō Gongen manifestation of Mount Ishizuchi related traditions.

The most widely familiar appearance of Zaō Gongen is centered around the Mount Ōmine and Mount Kinpusen range. This appearance is believed to have appeared to En no Gyōja after an extended period of ascetic practice at the summit of Mount Sanjō while praying for a Buddha capable of saving beings in a troubled age of violent and obstinate beings. In response to his prayers, it is said that Shakyamuni, Avalokitesvara, and Maitreya successively appeared before him. En no Gyōja, however, believed their gentle forms to be insufficient and so continued his austerities till, as temple records describe, the mountain shook and a great rock split open to reveal the figure of Kongō Zaō Dai-Gongen.

=== Ishizuchi Kongō Zaō Dai-Gongen (石鎚金剛蔵王大権現) ===
According to traditions preserved at Mount Ishizuchi, En no Gyōja performed ascetic practice in the range around the year 680 AD, praying for the salvation of all beings who were obstructed by the three poisons and to transform this land into a pure land to aid them. During these prayers, Amitābha, Avalokiteśvara, and Mahāsthāmaprāpta appeared to him. He was unsatisfied, however, by their offer of personal salvation in Sukhavati and by their gentle, unsuitable appearances, and so the three deities transformed into the figures of Ishizuchi Kongō Zaō Dai-Gongen. Tradition records also state that Kūkai, when practicing austerities at Mount Hoshigamori in the early ninth century, beheld Ishizuchi Dai-Gongen and received teachings from him.

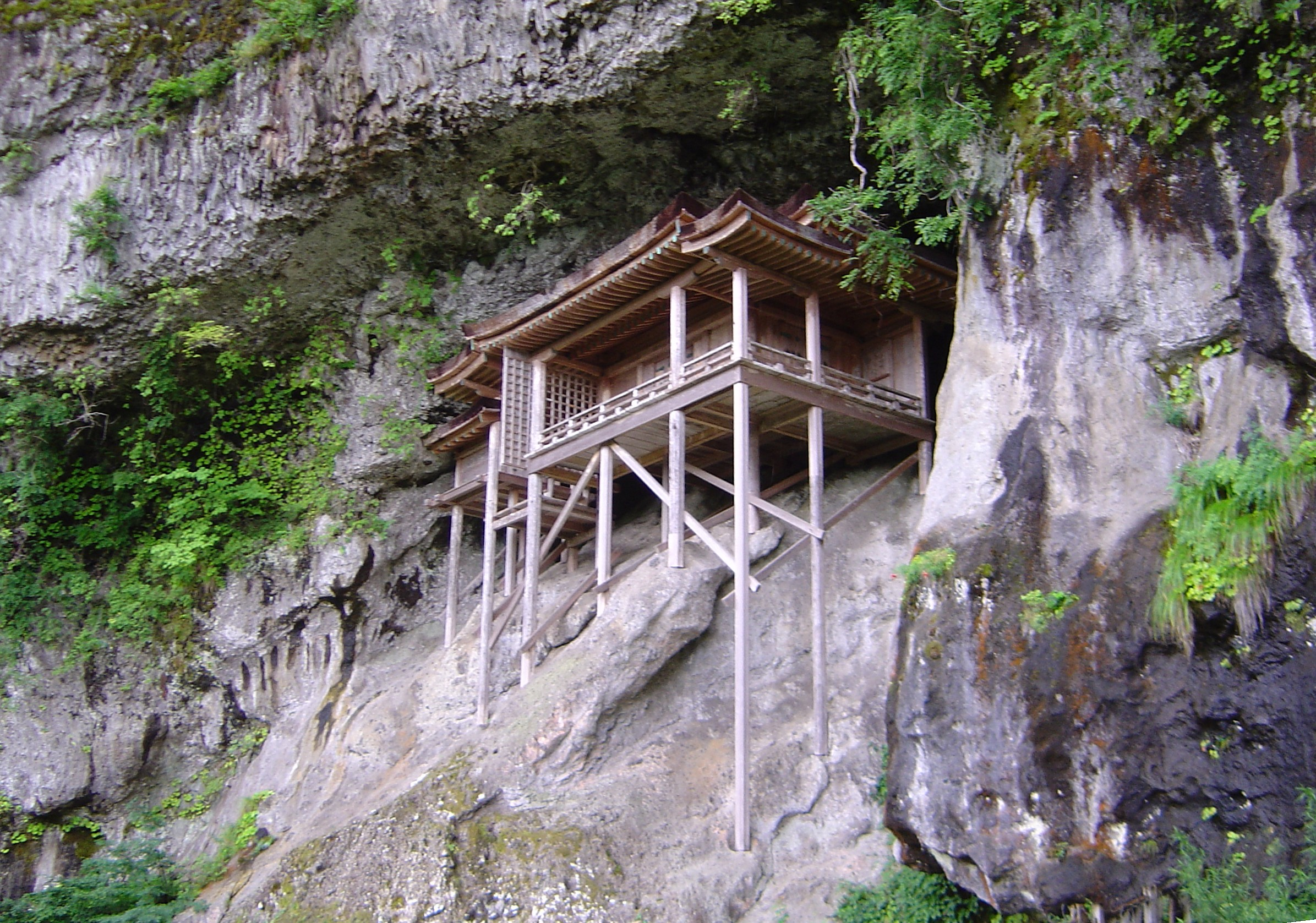
The Nageire-dō of Mt. Mitoku

=== Zaō Gongen of Mount Mitoku (三徳山蔵王権現) ===
According to the tradition of Mount Mitoku's Sanbutsu-ji, En no Gyōja arrived at the mountain in 706 and established it as a place of ascetic practice after he had seen a lotus petal fall from the sky there. It is said that he enshrined Zaō Gongen in the mountain when he built a small temple at the foot of the mountain, shrank it to the size of his hand, and tossed it into the recesses of the cliffside, where it resides and is referred to as the Nageire-dō.

== Practices ==
Miyake Hitoshi describes the main worldview and practice as follows:

Shugendō practice is centered on mountain asceticism and ritual engagement with the sacred and supernatural. In Shugendō thought, mountains are understood as sacred realms inhabited by deities and as places where the ordinary and spiritual realms intersect. Mountain practice, pilgrimage, and rituals are consequently understood not merely as physical austerities but as means of engaging with this sacred realm.

The tantric Buddhist deities Dainichi Nyorai (大日如来, Mahāvairocana) and Fudō Myōō (不動明王, Acalanatha Vidyaraja) play a central role in Shugendō practice. However, Shugendō ritualists also practice different rituals, prayers, and ceremonies associated with particular deities, including the buddhas Yakushi and Amida; the bodhisattvas Monju, Kokūzō, and Kannon; as well as Indian deities like Benzai-ten and Daikoku-ten; and Japanese kami like Inari.

=== Mountain practice ===
The most common Shugendō practices are "practices in the mountains" (入峰修行, nyūbu shugyō). In Shugendō, sacred mountains are seen as a supernatural home of numerous deities and as a symbol of the entire universe. According to Miyake, "the central element which forms both of these rituals is the symbolic action exhibited in a state of identification with the central deity Fudō Myōō."

Some forms of mountain practice according to Miyake Hitoshi are:

- Entering the mountain to hold ceremonies, make offerings, read or bury sutras, and so forth, in honor of various buddhas or other deities in the mountain seen as a mandala.
- Entering the mountain for periods of retreat, in which shugenja do various ascetic practices and receive esoteric knowledge and initiations.
- The most advanced nyūbu is the wintertime retreat in the mountains said to confer special Siddhis.

=== Ritual practice ===
Shugendō has a wide variety of initiations that are unique to the Shugendō tradition but are based on Esoteric Buddhist abhiseka, as well as practices like fire ceremonies for averting misfortunes (sokusai goma), usually focused around Fudō Myōō. There was, and still is, often tension between various Shugendō institutions over a lack of centralized standards, term usage, and implications, with terms like kanjō and sendatsu being prime examples. In some traditions, these terms carry the implication of someone who has undergone extensive religious study and been given esoteric training transmission, while in some lay traditions they mean someone who has made a certain number of ascents and been given certification as a mountain guide.

=== Lay, confraternity, and institutional practice ===
The scope of practice is often dependent on the degree of formalization one engages in. It can range from lay participation, pilgrimage confraternities (kō 講, kai 会), and the training of initiated shugenja priests in an institution (shu 宗, ha 派). While all are Shugendō, mountain asceticism is performed, and the attire is identical, the expected degree or variety of training is different.

Lay individuals may participate in pilgrimages, devotional practices, prayers, and other observances. Other lay individuals may participate through pilgrimage confraternities under the guidance of a lay leader or Buddhist priest from a Shugendō-related or non-Shugendō-related Buddhist or Shinto sect.

Fully institutionalized practice is undertaken by ordained priests who have completed the prescribed training and transmissions of a recognized lineage, in some traditions called ichiryū denjū (一流伝授), a lengthy transmission of the entire lineage system. This form of Shugendō combines mountain asceticism with esoteric Buddhist ritual, particularly from the Shingon and Tendai traditions. Shugendō thus, under one term, can encompass a spectrum from lay, through confraternity, to institutional priesthood.

=== Minor skills or practices ===
Other minor practices which are part of Shugendō include the following:

- fortunetelling and divination (bokusen, 卜占)
- Shugendō practitioners also take part in Shinto festivals (matsuri, 祭) and make offerings to kami.
- obtaining oracles through mediums that have been possessed by a deity (yori kitō, 憑祈禱)
- using incantations (kaji, 加持) for a specific purpose
- spells and charms (fuju, 符呪; majinai, 呪い), used for healing, childbirth, protection, and so on
- exorcism (tsukimono otoshi, 憑物落とし) for healing purposes

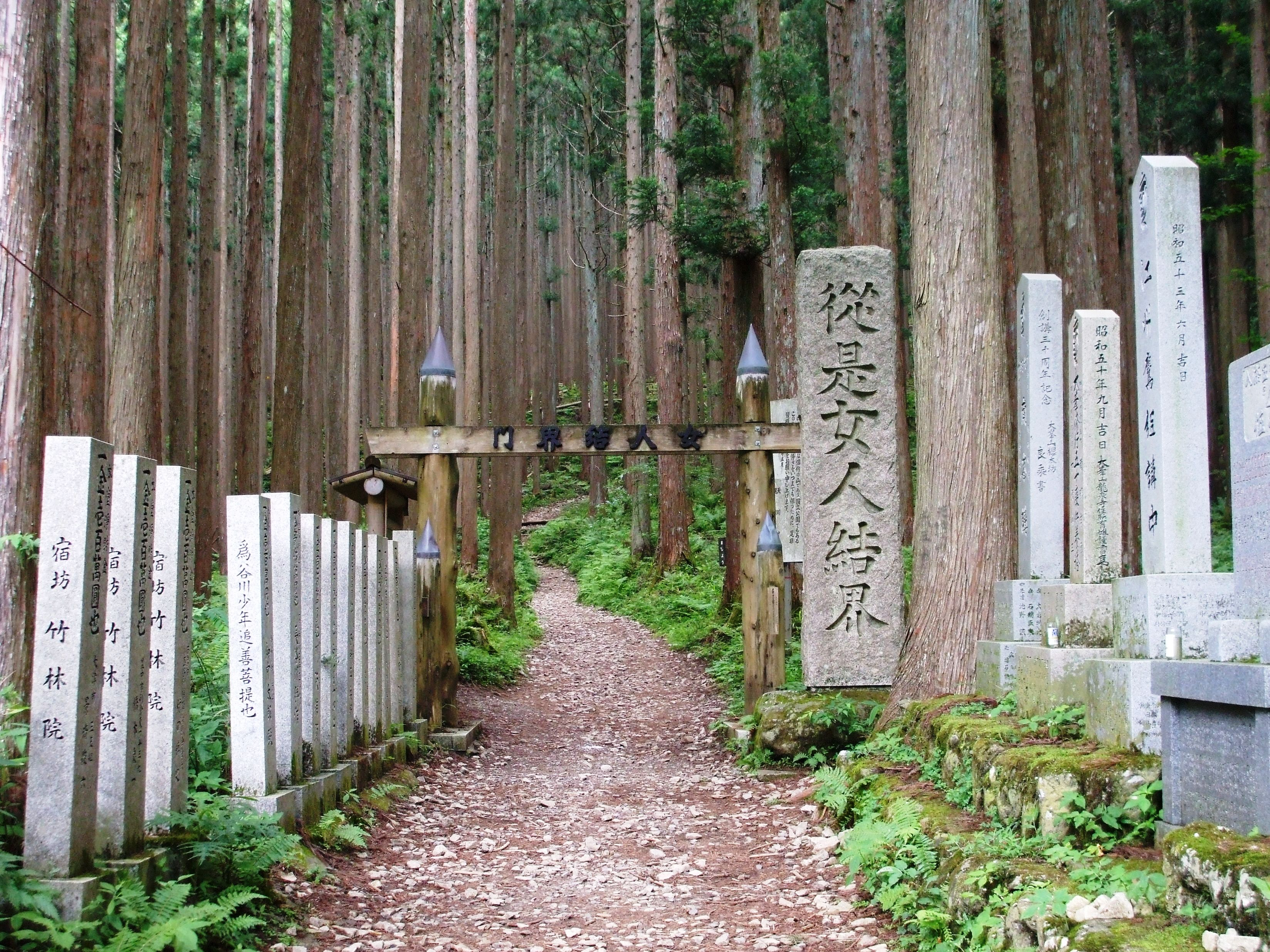
The entrance of the route to Mount Ōmine

== Sacred sites ==
The following are selected notable geographical sites associated with Shugendō.

- Mount Ōmine 大峰山 is a major non denominational pilgrimage site for practitioners across the nation and one of Japan's Seven Holy Mountains. Ominesan-ji Temple 大峰山寺 is located near the peak and managed by both the Shingon and Tendai based traditions at different times annually. Known to be the site where Omine Kongō Zaō Gongen 金剛蔵王権現 appeared before En no Gyoja.
- Mount Kinpusen 金峯山 is a mountain that historically has been a place of cultivation where at different times Shingon and Tendai institutions of Shugendo thrived. In history it served as one of the main cultivation sites of the Shingon master Rigen Daishi.
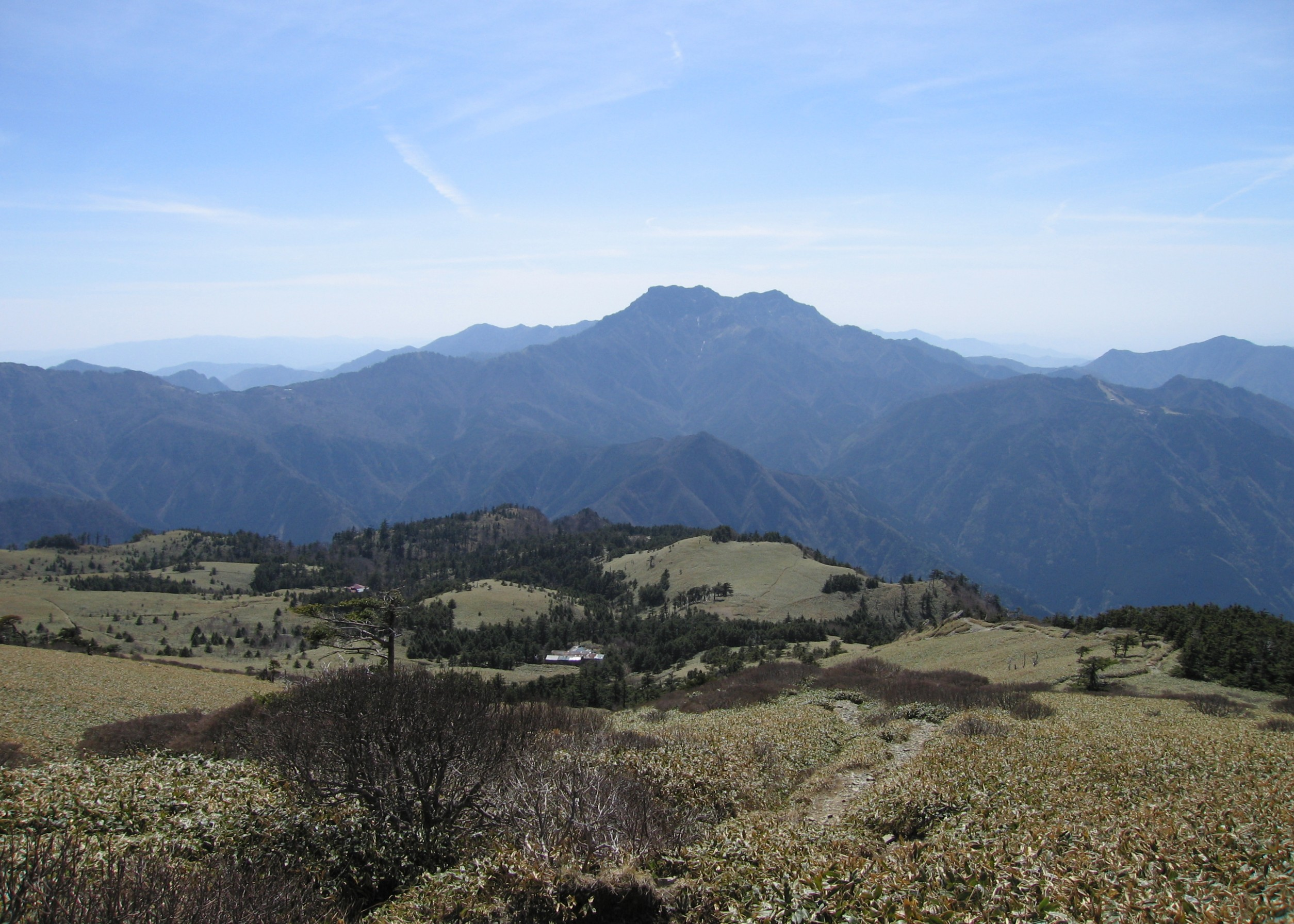
  Mount Ishizuchi from Mount Kamegamori (瓶ヶ森)
- Ishizuchisan 石鎚山, one of Japan's Seven Holy Mountains, consists of three primary mountains Tengu dake 天狗岳, Kamegamori 瓶ヶ森, and Ryuosan 龍王山. It is also a site of Tengu faith with the veneration of Hōki-bō Daitengu 法起坊大天狗.
- Mount Kongō 金剛山 is known as a sacred site in the Katsuragi network of Shugendō practitioners. Centered around the temple is Tenporin-ji 転法輪寺. The mountain is associated with the faith of the deity Hōki Daibosatsu 法起大菩薩.
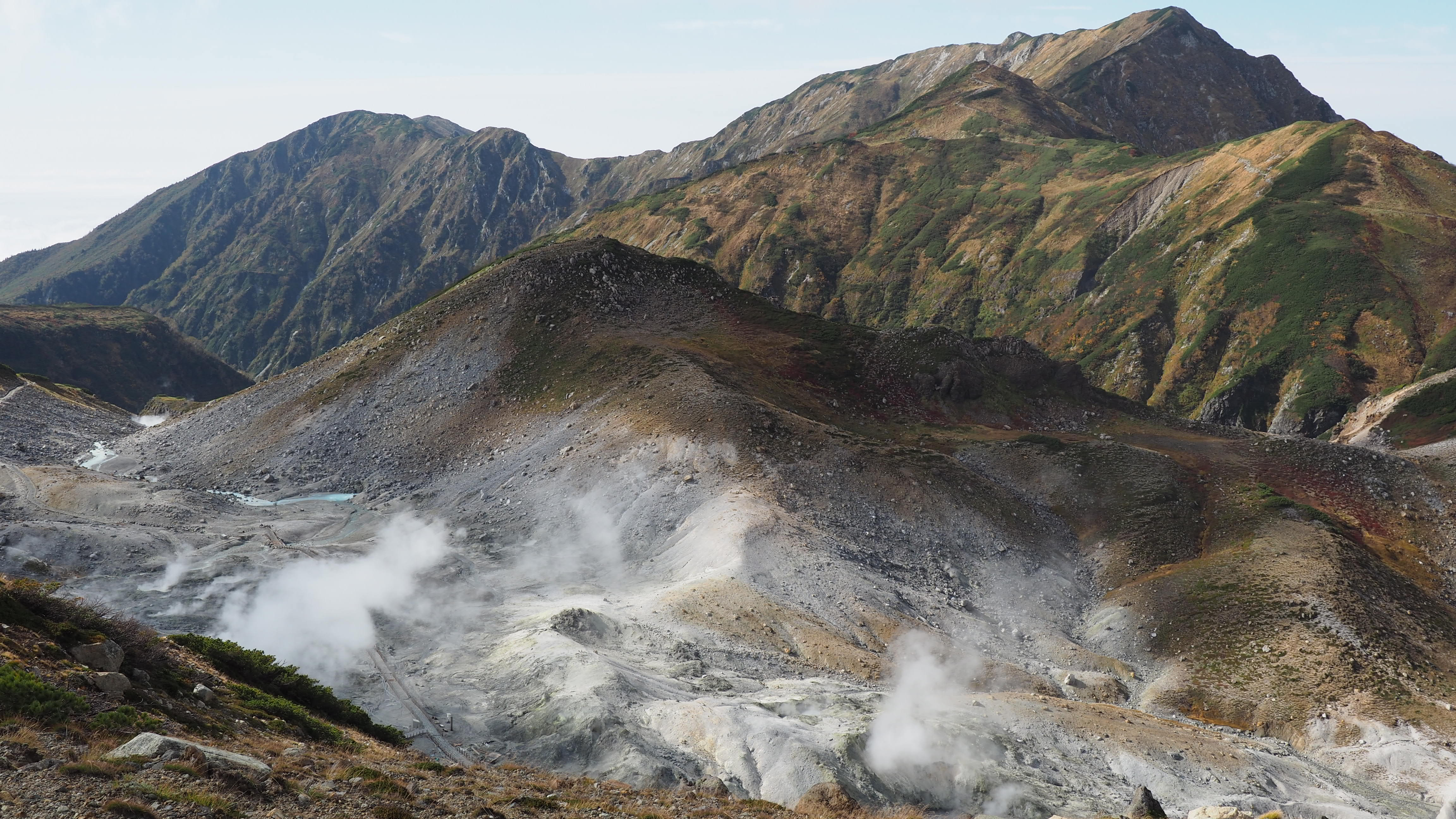
  The sulfur-rich range of Mount Tate
- Tateyama 立山, one of Japan's Seven Holy Mountains, was affiliated with the Shogoin tradition of Shugendo. Since the Shinto Buddhist Separation order there has been a sharp decline in institutional practice in the region.
- Mount Haku is one of Japan's Seven Holy Mountains, including Gozenpō 御前峰, Ōnanjimine 大汝峰, Bessan 別山, Kengamine 剣ヶ峰, Ōkurayama 大倉山, and Sannomine 三ノ峰 peaks.
- Sanyama-sama 三山様: the three mountains of Dewa Sanzan 出羽三山. Historically centered around the Hagurosan Kōtakuji Shōzenin 羽黒山荒沢寺正善院. There is also a prominent Shinto yamabushi tradition in the area.
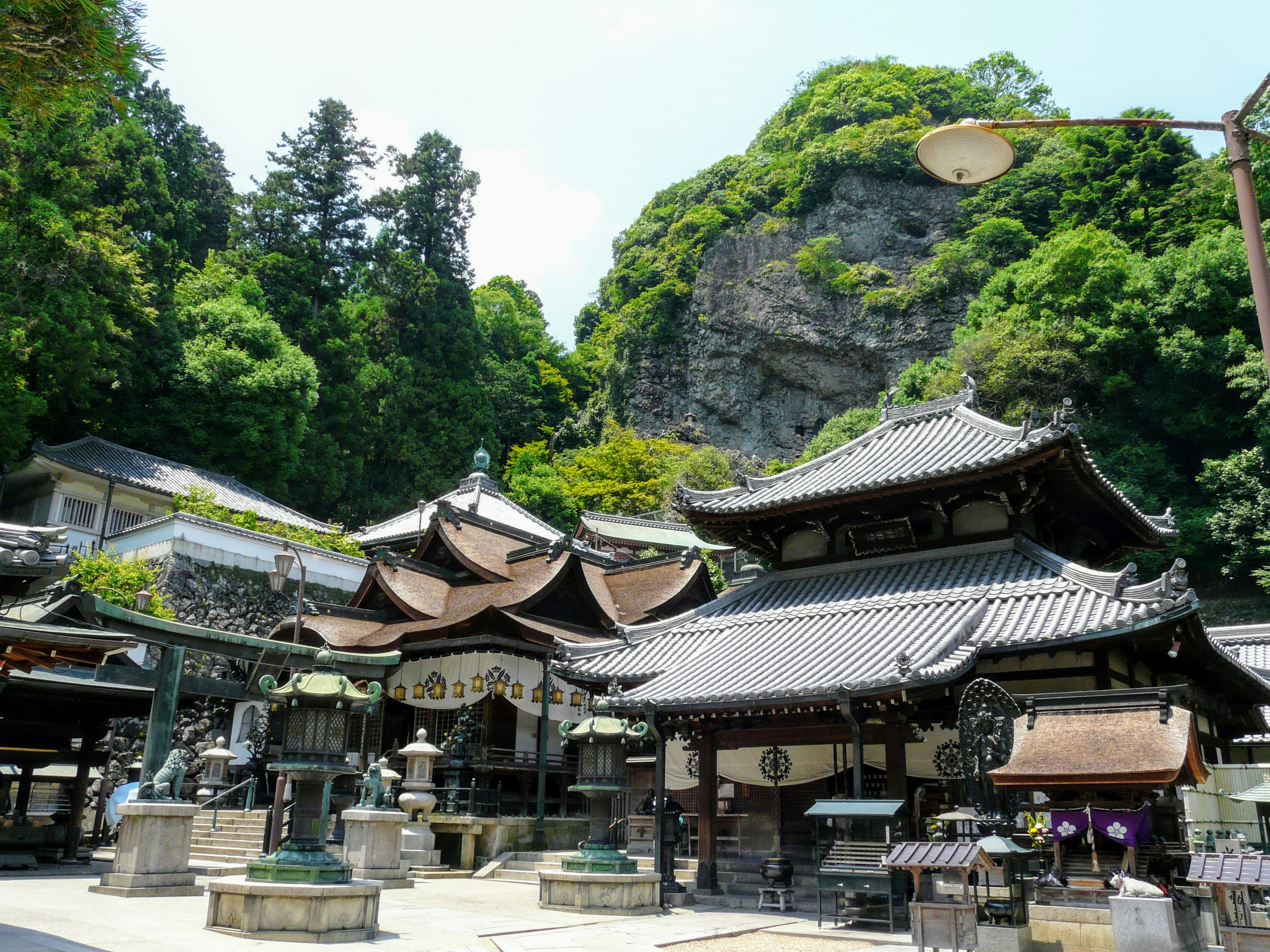
  The grounds of Hozan-ji along the slopes of Mount Ikoma
- Mount Minō 箕面山 in Minō, Osaka Prefecture is a mountain tied to the history of En no Gyoja's early cultivation.
- Mount Ikoma, located on the border of Osaka and Nara prefectures, is centered around Hōzan-ji and the Hōzan-ji Shingon Sect. The founder of the temple, the Shingon master Tankai, propagated a belief in the combined practice of Shingon, Shugendo, and the Vinaya.
- Mount Mitoku Sanbutsu-ji in Tottori Prefecture.

== See also ==
- Shingon Buddhism
- Tendai Buddhism
- En no Gyoja
- Mount Ōmine
- Mount Ishizuchi
- Hozan-ji
- Gongen
- Shinto
- Kūkai

== General and cited references ==
- Carter, Caleb Swift (2022). A Path into the Mountains: Shugendō and Mount Togakushi. Honolulu: University of Hawaii Press. doi:10.2307/j.ctv2rb76h6. ISBN 978-0-8248-9013-1. JSTOR j.ctv2rb76h6.
- Castiglioni, Andrea; Rambelli, Fabio; Roth, Carina, eds. (2020). Defining Shugendō: Critical Studies on Japanese Mountain Religion. London: Bloomsbury Publishing. ISBN 978-1-350-17939-4.
- Faure, Bernard; Moerman, Max; Sekimori, Gaynor (2011). Shugendō: The History and Culture of a Japanese Religion. Kyoto: Ecole française d'Extrême-Orient, centre de Kyoto. ISBN 9782855391236.
- Gill, Andrea K. (2012). "Shugendō: Pilgrimage and Ritual in a Japanese Folk Religion". Pursuit - the Journal of Undergraduate Research at the University of Tennessee. 3 (2): 49–65. doi:10.7290/pur32otzk. ISSN 2330-4715.
- Grapard, Allan G. (2016). Mountain Mandalas: Shugendō in Kyushu. Bloomsbury Shinto Studies. London: Bloomsbury Publishing. ISBN 978-1-4742-4900-3.
- Hitoshi, Miyake; Sekimori, Gaynor (2005). The Mandala of the Mountain: Shugendō and Folk Religion (1st ed.). Tokyo: Keio University Press. ISBN 9784766411287.
- Miyake, Hitoshi (1989). "Religious Rituals in Shugendo: A Summary". Japanese Journal of Religious Studies. 16 (2/3): 101–116. doi:10.18874/jjrs.16.2-3.1989.101-116. JSTOR 30234003.
