= Gokuraku-ji (Saijō) =

Buddhist temple in Ehime Prefecture, Japan

Coordinates: 33.8454°N 133.1464°E

- 極楽寺
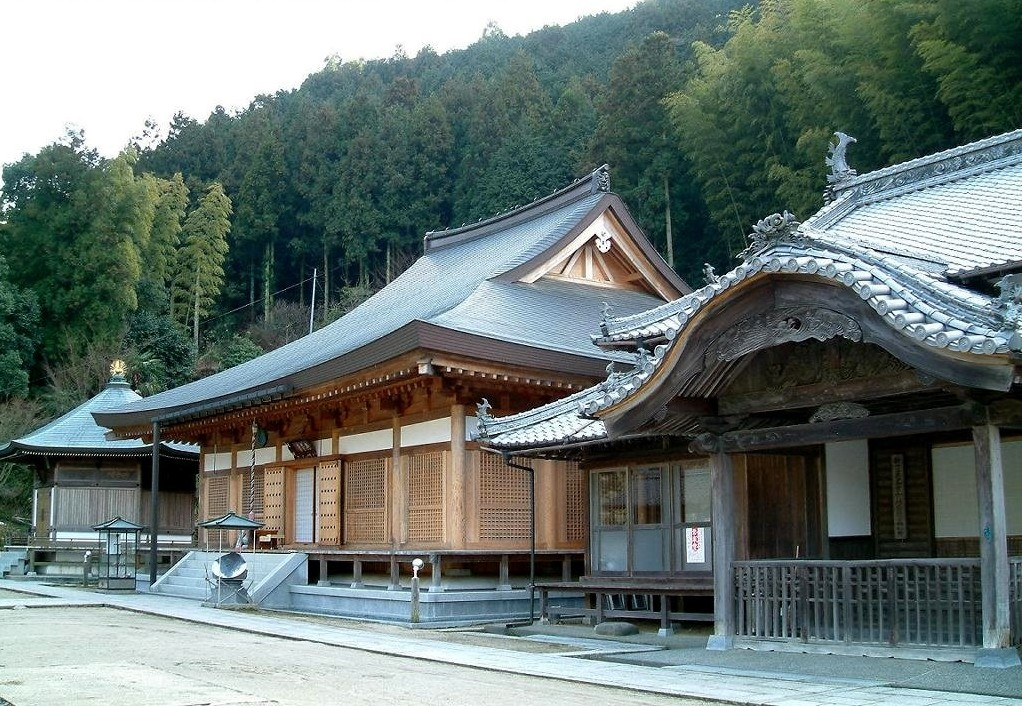
- Main Hall

Religion
- Affiliation: Ishizuchisan Shingon Shu
- Sect: Kogi Shingon, Shugendo
- Deity: Fudo Myōō, Aizen Myōō, Ishizuchi Kongō Zaō Dai Gongen, Cintamanicakra, Hōkibō Daitengu, Kangiten

Location
- Location: 4-36 Ohoki, Saijo City, Ehime Prefecture

Architecture
- Founder: En no Gyōja
- Established: 680

Gokuraku-ji (極楽寺) is the head temple of the Ishizuchisan Shingon and Shugendō sect in Saijō, Ehime Prefecture, Japan. The principal images are Fudo Myōō, Aizen Myōō, and Zaō Gongen. It is the fundamental training center for Ishizuchisan sect, and has been a major training center for Shugendō for about 1,300 years.

== History ==
According to the temple document known as the Gokurakuji Engi (極楽寺縁起), around 680 AD, En no Gyōja retreated to Mount Ryuo, where he could look up at Mount Ishizuchi, purified himself at the Fudogataki waterfall and underwent training for days on end. It is said, later on the summit of Mt. Ishizuchi, the majestic Amitābha Tathāgata appeared, flanked by Avalokiteshvara and Mahāsthāmaprāpta Bodhisattvas above the mountain across the valley kamegamori 瓶ヶ森. En no Gyōja prayed the following in their presence, "In the coming age and decline of the Dharma, sentient beings will increasingly lose their spiritual capabilities and many will suffer in the sea of suffering. Please drive away the three poisons in the hearts of all sentient beings and guide them to the path of enlightenment." Responding to his prayer, a thunderous sound rattled, and the compassionate forms of the Amitābha Trio transformed into fierce, wrathful appearances known as Ishizuchi Kongō Zaō Dai-gongen, before he carved their likeness into wood.

En no Gyōja later founded Tengaji Temple, which kept these three Ishizuchi Gongen statues as its principal image, and the temple flourished from the Heian period to the Muromachi period and was serviced by many eminent practitioners such as Jōsen Bosatsu, Kōjō Daishi (光定大師) of the Tendai sect, and Kōbō Daishi 弘法大師, who when practicing in the mountains of Ishizuchisan is said to have beheld Ishizuchi Kongō Zaō Dai-gongen and received teachings from him. These teachings being institutional to the foundations of the sect as a temple of Shingon Buddhism and Shugendo. However, at the end of the Muromachi period, Tengaji Temple was burned down in 1350 during the wars of the Sengoku period, and the head priest at the time, Gyozen Daitoku (行善大徳), ordered his disciple Yūhō Daishi (宥法大師) to find a place to continue the flame of Tengaji's teachings, before dying. Yūhō found a place where he could look up at Mount Ryuo, built a temple, named it Gokurakuji, and protected the flame of the teachings.

Later, the central of the three Ishizuchi Zao Gongen statues that were the principal image of Tengaji, the central Kongo Zaō Gongen, was excavated from the ruins of Tengaji and enshrined as the principal image of Gokurakuji's Zao-den. Since Gokurakuji was established, two fires destroyed many treasures, but the original images have been preserved, and to this day, goma ceremonies are held daily in front of Ishizuchi Kongo Zaō Gongen in the mornings and evenings. In 2014, the two side statues, Ryuouku Zao Gongen and Muihouku Zao Gongen, which had been lost, were replaced, completing the set. In the Meiji period, the Shinto-Buddhist separation order was enacted, many temples in the area joined larger government friendly sects and abandoned Zao Gongen and Shugendo worship, this temple was not abandoned, and Ishizuchi faith has continued unbroken. Currently, the chief abbot is Kanno Kensho, and the keeper is Kanno Kensei.

== Beliefs ==
Hōkibō Daitengu (法起坊大天狗)

Is a Daitengu particularly venerated by the Ishizuchisan Shingon School. According to temple records, the name derives from the kanji Hōki (法起), referencing Hōki Bodhisattva (法起菩薩), traditionally identified as the samboghakaya of En no Gyōja in Shugendo Theology. Temple documentation states that among the 48 Daitengu mentioned in the Tengu Sutra, Hōkibō is the only one bearing the name associated with En no Gyōja's manifestation.

Temple tradition records an event in which Hōkibō appeared before an acharya of the Ishizuchisan school at Mount Tengu the peak of Ishizuchisan. It is said he identified himself as En no Gyōja, and that following his death in his physical form as the elderly ascetic, he manifested as this appearance atop Mount Tengu to continue his prayers and preserve and transmit esoteric teachings. In this account, Hōkibō requests the acharya that the dissemination of these teachings given to him never leaves the mountain based tradition of Ishizuchisan and to guard them with proper transmission.

The Gokurakuji tradition views the veneration of Hōkibō as central to the guardianship of veneration to En no Gyōja and his final teachings. The temple emphasizes that these teachings belong exclusively to the tradition's lineage and the protection of which is their highest priority.

== Affiliation and role in Ishizuchisan Shingon Buddhism ==
Gokuraku-ji serves as the head temple of the Ishizuchisan Shingon School (石鎚山真言宗, Ishizuchisan Shingon-shū), a Japanese Esoteric Buddhist sect within the Kōgi Shingon (Orthodox Shingon) tradition. The school maintains Shingon and Shugendō (mountain ascetic) lineage lines, and is centered on Mount Ishizuchi in Ehime Prefecture.

=== Doctrine and training ===
Ishizuchisan Shingon’s doctrine centers on esoteric Shingon and Shugendō practices and ascetic austerities. The school maintains two distinct training paths:

- Shingon education: Tokudō (ordination), Shidō Kegyo (initiations), Denpō Kanjō (elementary empowerment), and Ichiryū Denjū and further empowerments (master-level empowerment)
- Shugendō training: Mountain pilgrimages, waterfall purification, mountain austerities, and initiation to tantric practice.

=== Contemporary role and outreach ===
Gokuraku-ji continues to function as a key Shingon and Shugendō training site, preserving the veneration of Zaō Gongen. The temple has played this role for over 1,300 years.

In recent years, the Ishizuchisan Shingon School has expanded its international outreach, translating the entirety of the corpus of their lineage into English-language materials and inviting sincere individuals from abroad to engage with its teachings. While advanced esoteric practices remain reserved for initiated practitioners, the sect provides introductory content and guidance through its official portal.

== Gallery ==
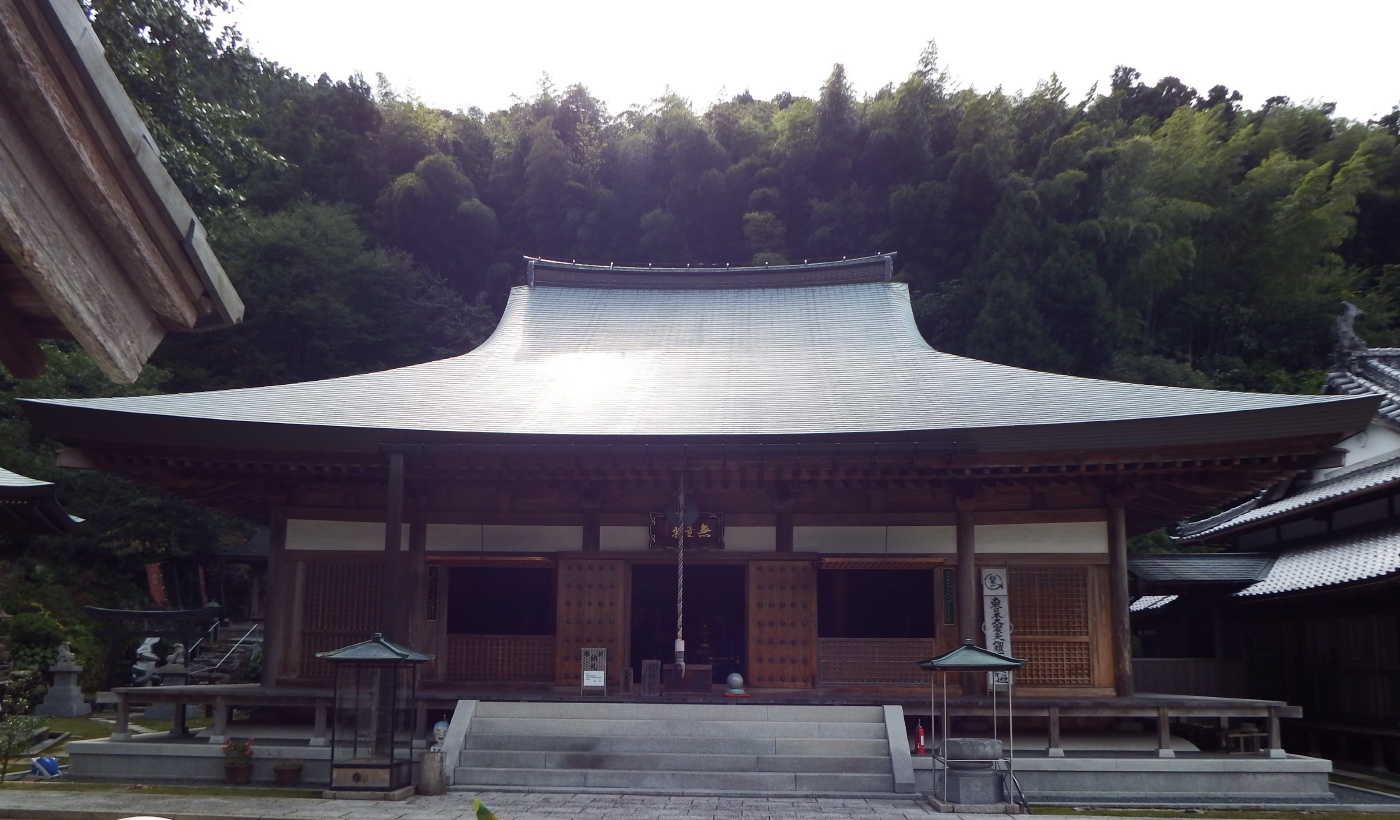
Main Hall

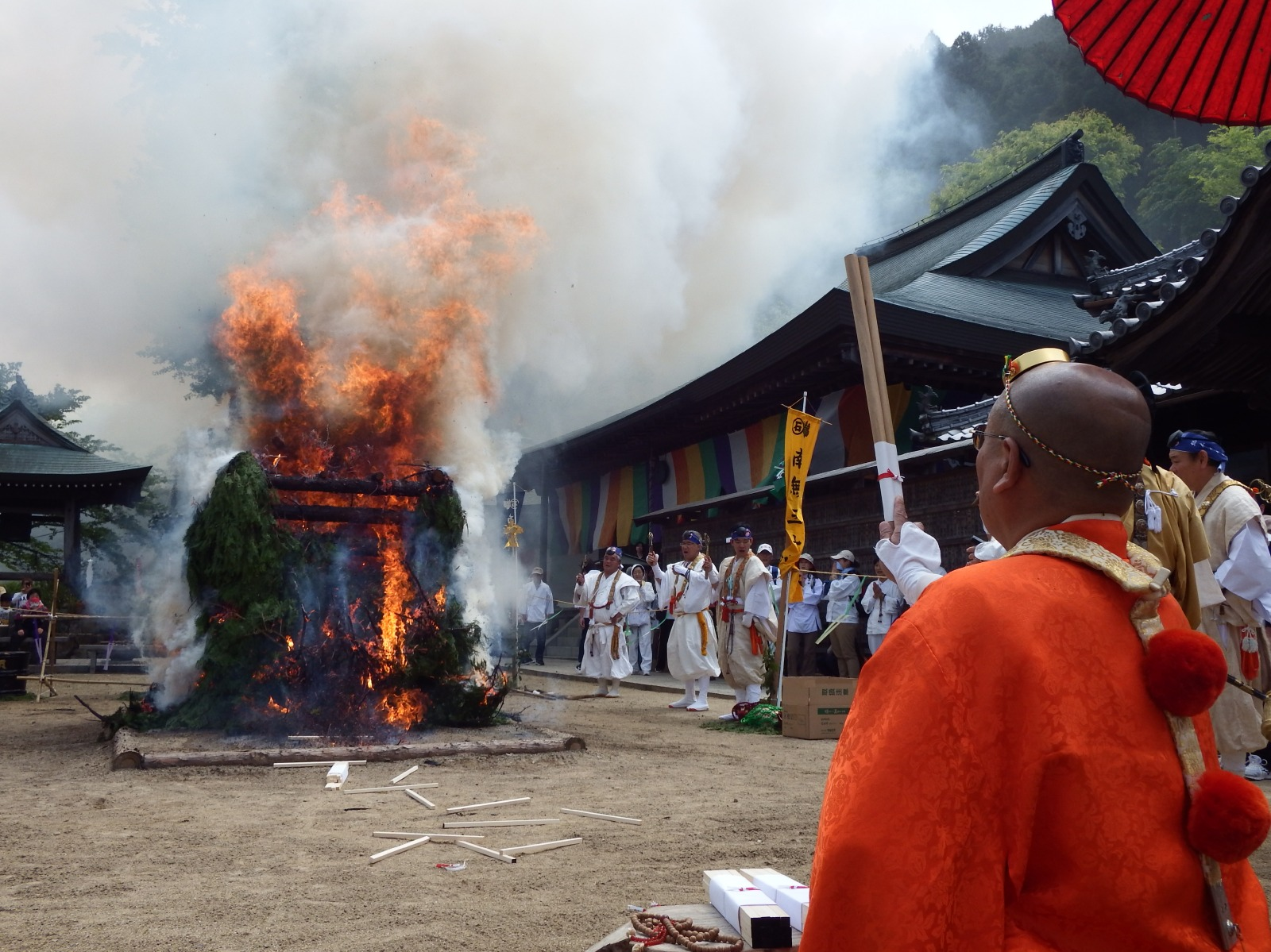
Goma Fire Ritual

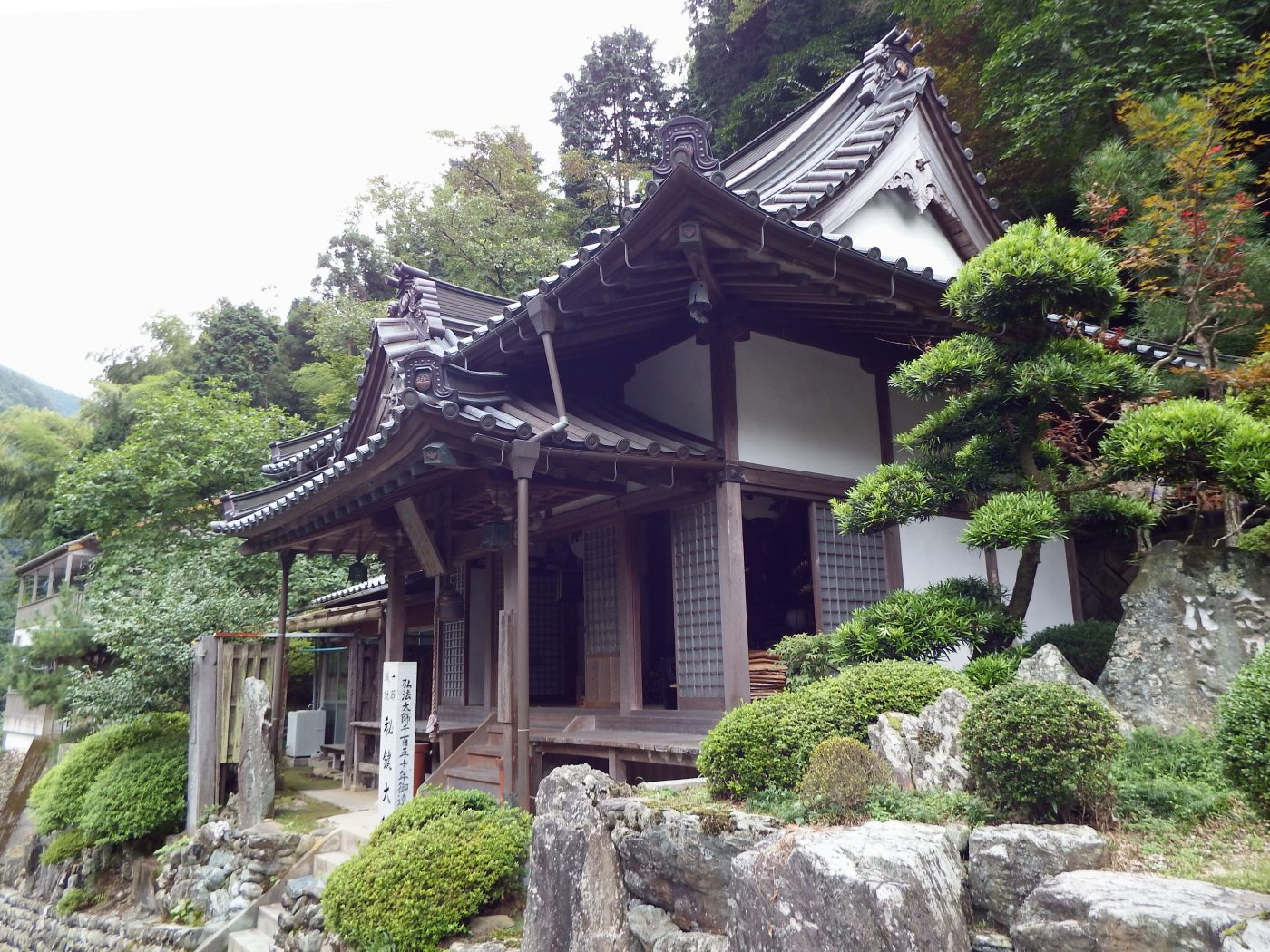
Daishido Hall

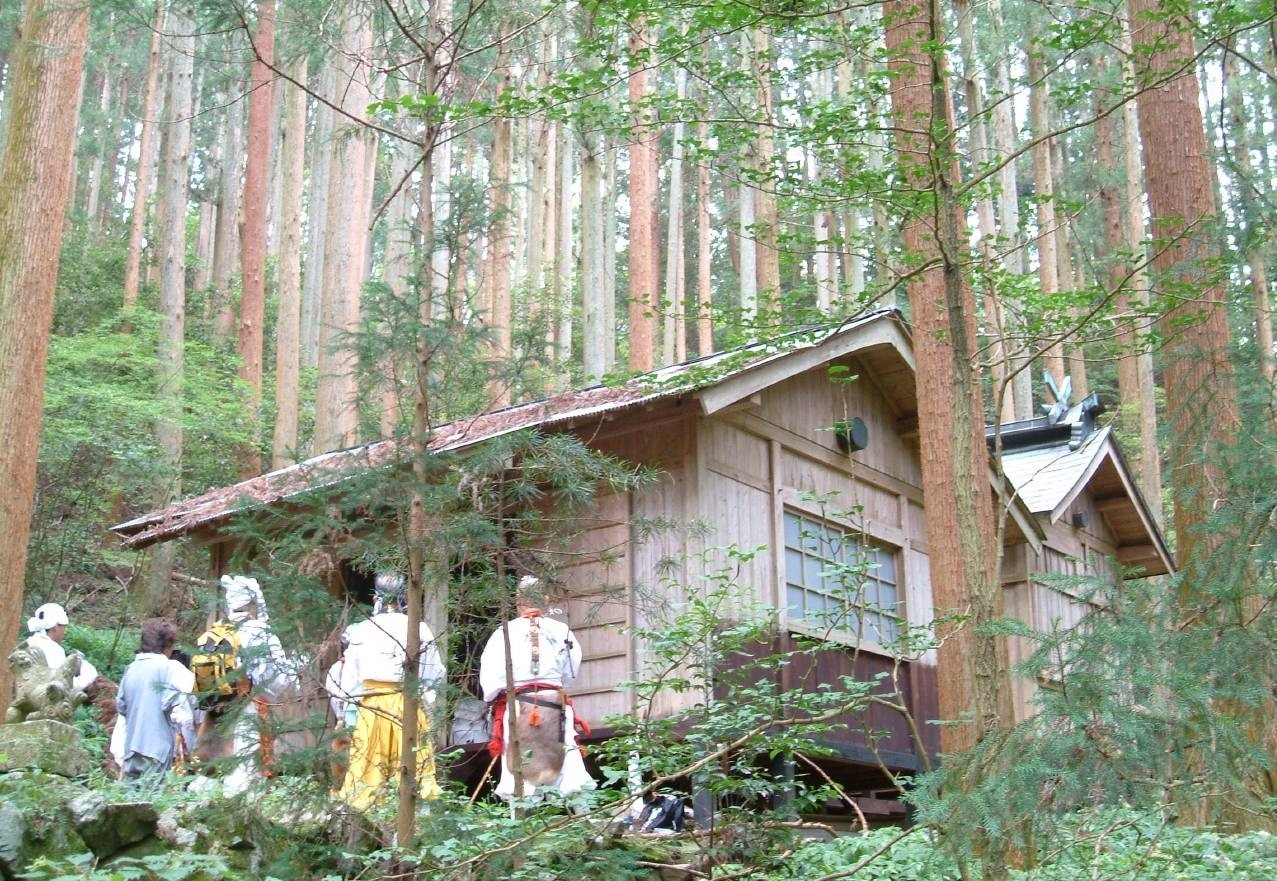
The temple at the site of Tenkawa-ji Temple

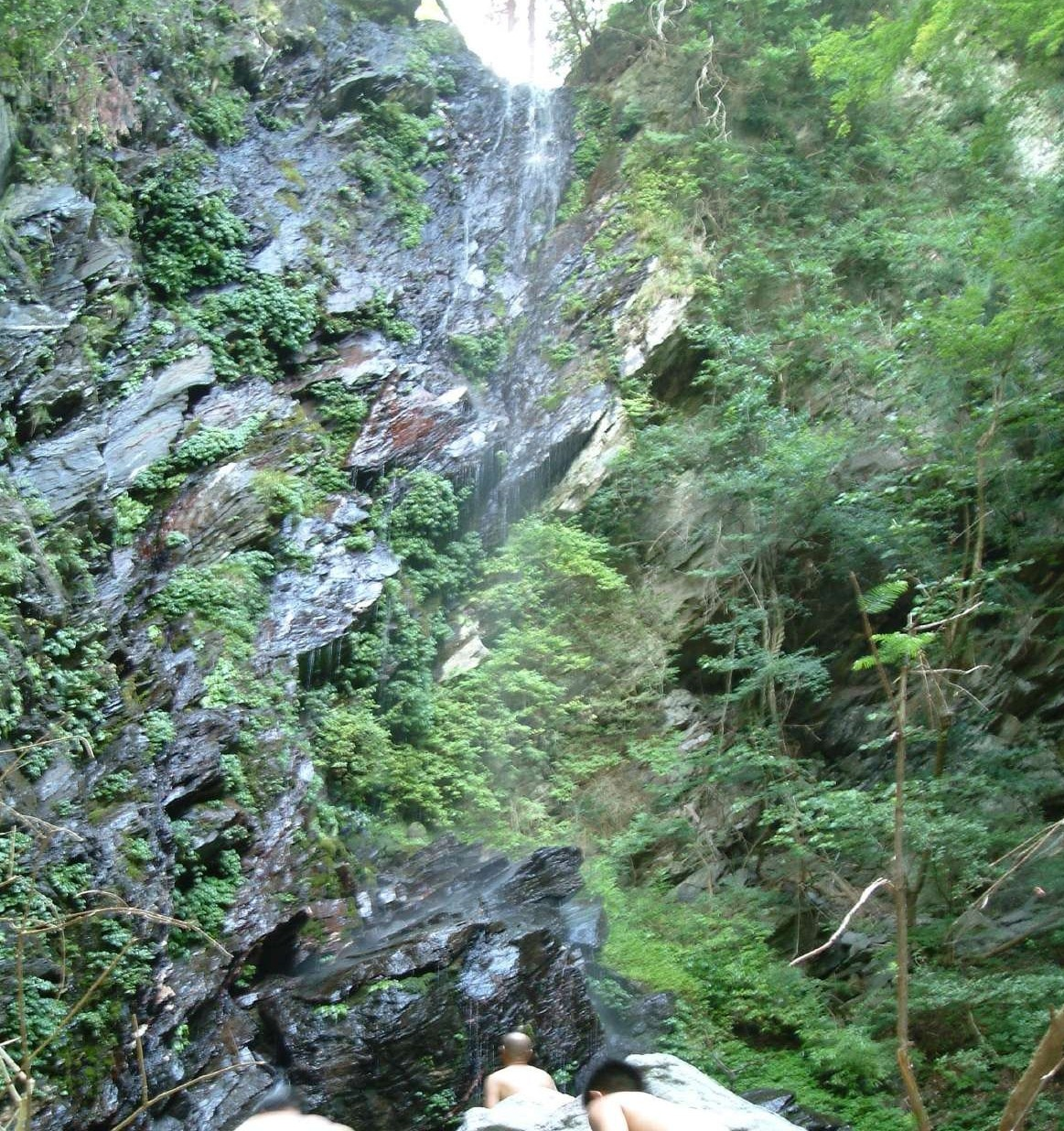
Fudogataki Falls
