= En no Gyōja =

7th-century Japanese ascetic and mystic; founder of Shugendō

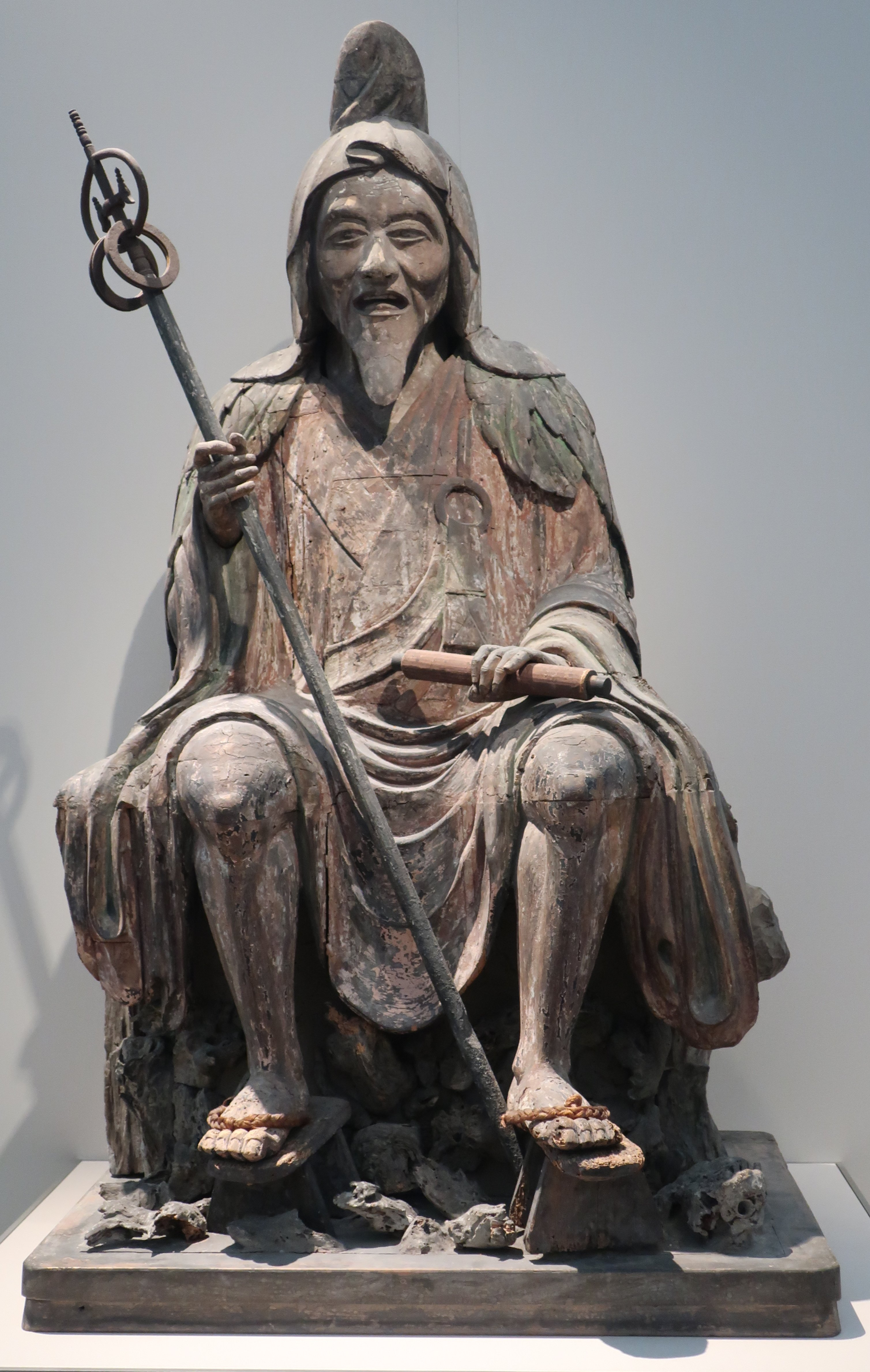
Statue of En no Gyōja, Kamakura period, c. 1300–1375, Kimbell Art Museum

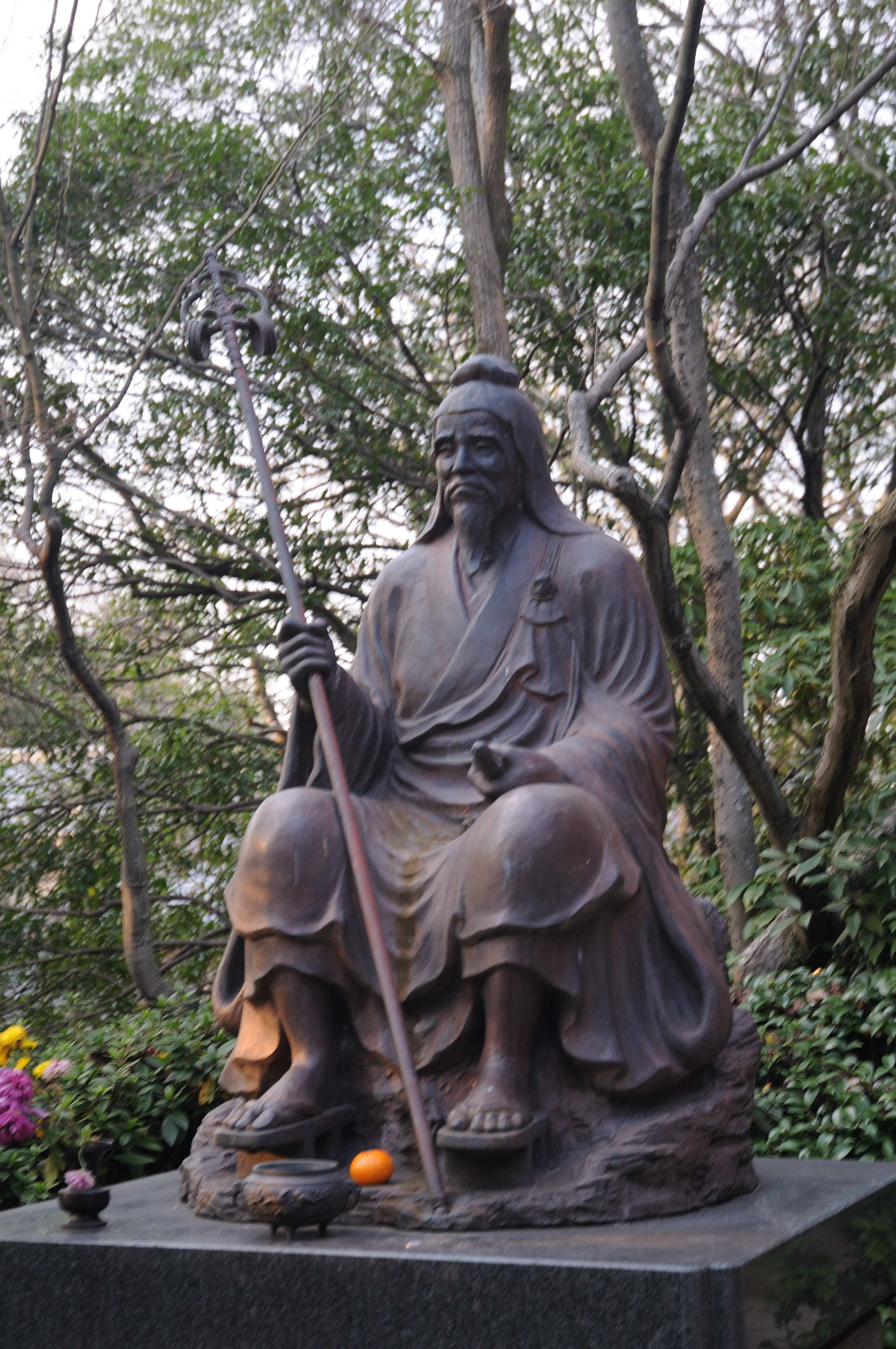
Statue of En no Gyōja in Goryūsonryū-in, Kurashiki, Okayama Prefecture, Japan

En no Ozunu/Ozuno/Otsuno (役 小角; b. 634, in Katsuragi (modern Nara Prefecture); d. c. 700–707) was a Japanese ascetic and mystic, traditionally held to be the founder of Shugendō, the path of ascetic training practiced by the gyōja or yamabushi.

He was banished by the Imperial Court to Izu Ōshima on June 26, 699, but folk tales at least as old as the Nihon Ryōiki (c. 800) recount his supernatural powers and exploits.

He is also referred to by the name En no Gyōja (役 行者; Japanese pronunciation: [en no ɡʲoꜜː.(d)ʑa, eꜜn no ɡʲoː.(d)ʑa], lit. 'En the ascetic'), En no Ubasoku (役優婆塞, "En the Layman") , or also under the full name En no Kimi Ozunu, where Kimi (君) is his kabane or titular name.

== Historical references ==
Even historical accounts of his life are intermixed with legends and folklore. According to the chronicle Shoku Nihongi (797), En no Ozunu was banished to the island of Izu Ōshima on June 26, AD 699:

On hinoto-ushi day (Note: See Sexagenary cycle#Problems with English translation. The sequential number for "fire ox" may be 14th, but this does not determine the day of month, because it is continuously carried over, and does not reset to zero at the start of each month.) [24th day of the 5th month, Mommu 3 (June 26, AD 699)], En no Kimi Ozunu was banished to Izu no Shima. Ozunu had first lived in Mount Katsuragi and been acclaimed for his sorcery and was the teacher of Outer Junior 5th Rank Lower Grade Karakuni no Muraji Hirotari. Later, [a person (or Hirotari?)] envied his power and accused him of trickery with his weird magic. [The Imperial Court] banished him far [from the Capital]. Rumor says, "Ozunu was able to manipulate demonic spirits, making them draw water and gather firewood. When they disobeyed, he bound them using sorcery."

In spite of this incident, it seems that the Court continued to highly evaluate the herbal knowledge of Ozunu's school, since Vol. 11 of the book also tells that on October 5, Tenpyō 4 (October 28, AD 732), his student Karakuni no Hirotari was elected as the Head Apothecary (典薬頭, Ten'yaku no Kami), the highest position in Agency for Apothecary (典薬寮, Ten'yaku-ryō).

== In the religion Shugendō ==
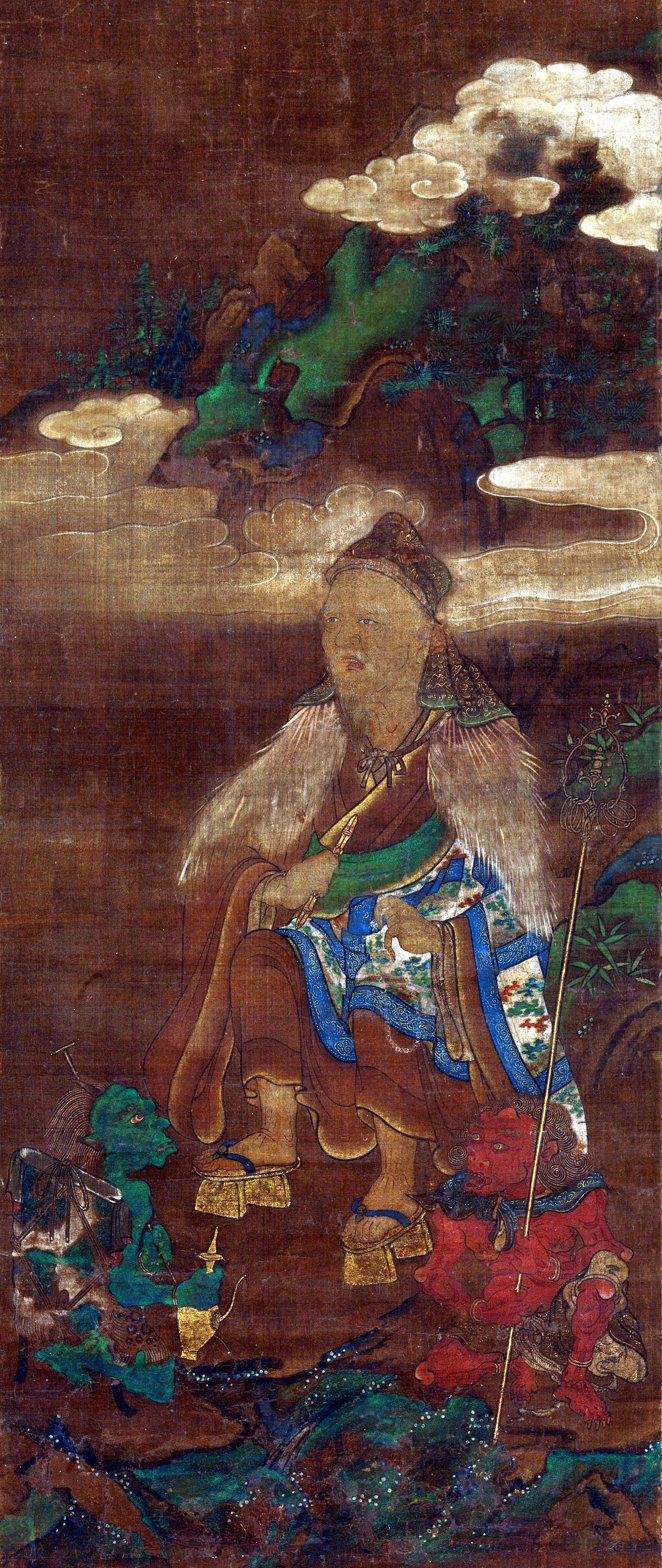
Muromachi period portrait of En no Gyōja accompanied by two oni (demons) providing water and wood

In folk religion, En no Ozunu is traditionally held to be the founder of Shugendō, a syncretic religion incorporating aspects of Taoism, Shinto, esoteric Buddhism (especially Shingon Mikkyō and the Tendai sect) and traditional Japanese shamanism.

En no Gyōja was conferred the posthumous title Jinben Daibosatsu (Great Bodhisattva Jinben, 神変大菩薩) at a ceremony held in 1799 to commemorate the one-thousandth year of his passing. Authorship of the non-canonical Sutra on the Unlimited Life of the Threefold Body is attributed to En no Gyōja. Due to his mythical status as a mountain saint, he was believed to possess many supernatural powers.

=== Hōki Bosatsu and the Hōkibō Daitengu of Mt. Ishizuchi ===
Before the Imperial conferral of the posthumous title Jinben Daibosatsu (神変大菩薩) in 1799, En no Gyōja was venerated under the bodhisattva name Hōki Bosatsu (法起菩薩; "Dharma Arising Bodhisattva"), a protector deity associated with mountain ascetics from his own time.

According to traditions preserved at Mt. Ishizuchi's religious institutions, after En no Gyōja ascended from Tenjōgatake in 701, he came to Mt. Ishizuchi, which he had opened in his youth, and manifested there as Ishizuchi-san Hōkibō Daitengu (石鎚山法起坊大天狗), guardian of the mountain and the surrounding region. He is enshrined under this identity at the Hōkibō-dō at Ishizuchi-san Gokuraku-ji (Saijō), the head temple of the Ishizuchi Shingon and Shugendō sect. His disciple Zenki is likewise venerated as Ōminesan Zenkibō, guardian of the Yoshino range. The name Hōkibō (法起坊) is written with the same characters as Hōki Bosatsu (法起菩薩), reflecting the continuity between En no Gyōja's bodhisattva identity and his manifestation as the great tengu of Mt. Ishizuchi.

== In popular culture ==
- In Kyoto's Gion Festival, one of the yamaboko floats (En no Gyoja Yama) is dedicated to En no Gyoja. It is an annual pilgrimage destination for yamabushi (practitioners of Shugendo), who perform various rituals on site.
- In the 19th century novel Nansou Satomi Hakkenden, the spirit of En no Gyoja gifts the Satomi family a magical japamala as a ward against their curse, which is later divided to become the personal talismans of the eponymous Eight Dog Warriors.
- In the historical fantasy novel Teito Monogatari by Hiroshi Aramata the protagonist Yasunori Kato claims to be a descendant of En no Gyōja.
- In the manga OZN by Shiro Ohno the protagonist is a superheroic version of En no Ozunu.
- In the SNES game Shin Megami Tensei, an NPC named En-no-ozuno resides in Kongokai.
- In the PS1 game Oni Zero: Fukkatsu, the main antagonist is En no Gyōja.
- In Koji Suzuki's novel Ring, Sadako's mother drags a statuette of En no Ozunu from the sea.
- In the movie "Ninja Assassin," the antagonist is 'Master Ozunu;' who heads the, "9 Clan".
- In the anime Zenki, a posthumous character named Enno Ozunu was the master of Zenki, who would centuries later be summoned again by his descendant, Chiaki Enno.
- The manga Touge Oni tells the tale of En no Ozuno and his two disciples, Zenki and Miyo (later Goki), traveling the land of Wa meeting various Kami.
- He appears as a Mitama given by the Guardian Tree in Toukiden and Toukiden : Kiwami. He is also in the second installment, still as a Mitama, but given randomly by slaying a higher leveled Oni.
- Many of the new-age popular Japanese writers, such as Mizurasu Kohaku and Hoshino Asahi, are influenced by En no Ozuno.
