= Ōmine Okugakemichi =

Pilgrimage route in Wakayama, Japan

- 大峯奥駈道 (Japanese)
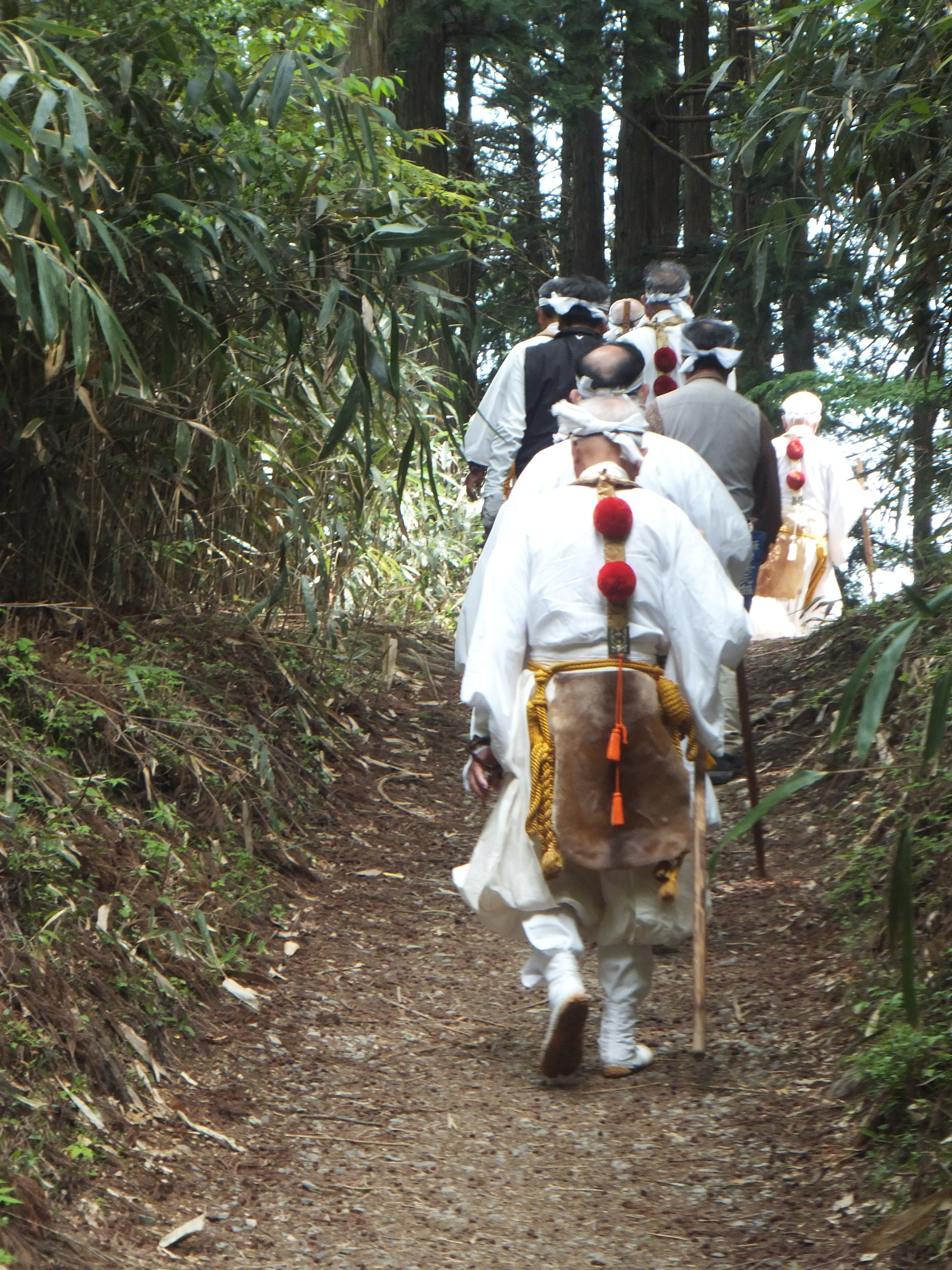
- Yamabushi on the Ōmine Okugakemichin

- Location within Wakayama Prefecture Location within Japan
- Type: Pilgrimage route
- Periods: Asuka period
- Location: Yoshino, Nara to Shingū, Wakayama, Japan
- Region: Kansai region

History
- Built: early 7th century AD

Site notes
- Public access: Yes

UNESCO World Heritage Site
- Type: Cultural
- Criteria: ii, iii, iv, vi
- Designated: 2004

The Ōmine Okugakemichi (大峯奥駈道, lit. “deep inner path of the grand peaks”) is a pilgrimage route on the Kii Peninsula in the Kansai region of Japan. It begins in Yanagi-no-shuku, a former ferry station on the Yoshino River in Nara prefecture, leads through the 1200-1900 meter Ōmine mountain region of Yoshino and Kumano in Wakayama Prefecture and ends after about 170 kilometers at the Kumano Hongū Taisha.

== Overview ==
According to tradition, the Ōmine Okugakemichi was established as a training ground for Shugendō, a syncretic religion incorporating aspects of Taoism, Shinto, esoteric Buddhism and traditional Japanese shamanism, by the Asuka period mystic En no Gyōja. It connects Kimpusen-ji in Yoshino district, Nara Prefecture with the Kumano Sanzan in southern Wakayama Prefecture. The route is very rugged and isolated, with a number of demanding sections up to narrow paths on steep slopes and steep climbs on cliffs. Mount Ōmine in the route's name is a specific holy mountain, but originally, the term referred to all of the Yoshino Mountains along the route. Believers took either Kumano or Yoshino as a starting point, depending on their religious orientation. The latter direction has dominated since the Edo period.

Along the route are 75 spiritual places called nabiki (靡) in caves, on rocks, at waterfalls, on mountain peaks, etc. are used for prayer or for spiritual exercises. For religious reasons, women have been forbidden to travel most of the route, and Mount Ōmine remains closed to women to this date. The path takes several days to complete, and is mostly wilderness with no settlements, and few possibilities to turn off the path once started.

During the Edo Period, Kishū Domain controlled most of the territory the path traversed, and often viewed Shugendō monks with suspicion. After the Meiji Restoration, Shugendō faced hostility from the Meiji government's separation of Buddhism and Shinto policies, and large portions of the path were lost or reverted to wilderness. In 1936, the area became part of the Yoshino-Kumano National Park, and from the 1980s, amateur historians and hiking groups have worked to restore the trail and to build mountain shelters for hikers and modern Shugendō followers attempting the trail. In 2002, the trail was designated as a National Historic Site, and it was included within the Sacred Sites and Pilgrimage Routes in the Kii Mountain Range UNESCO World Heritage Site since 2004.

== Gallery ==
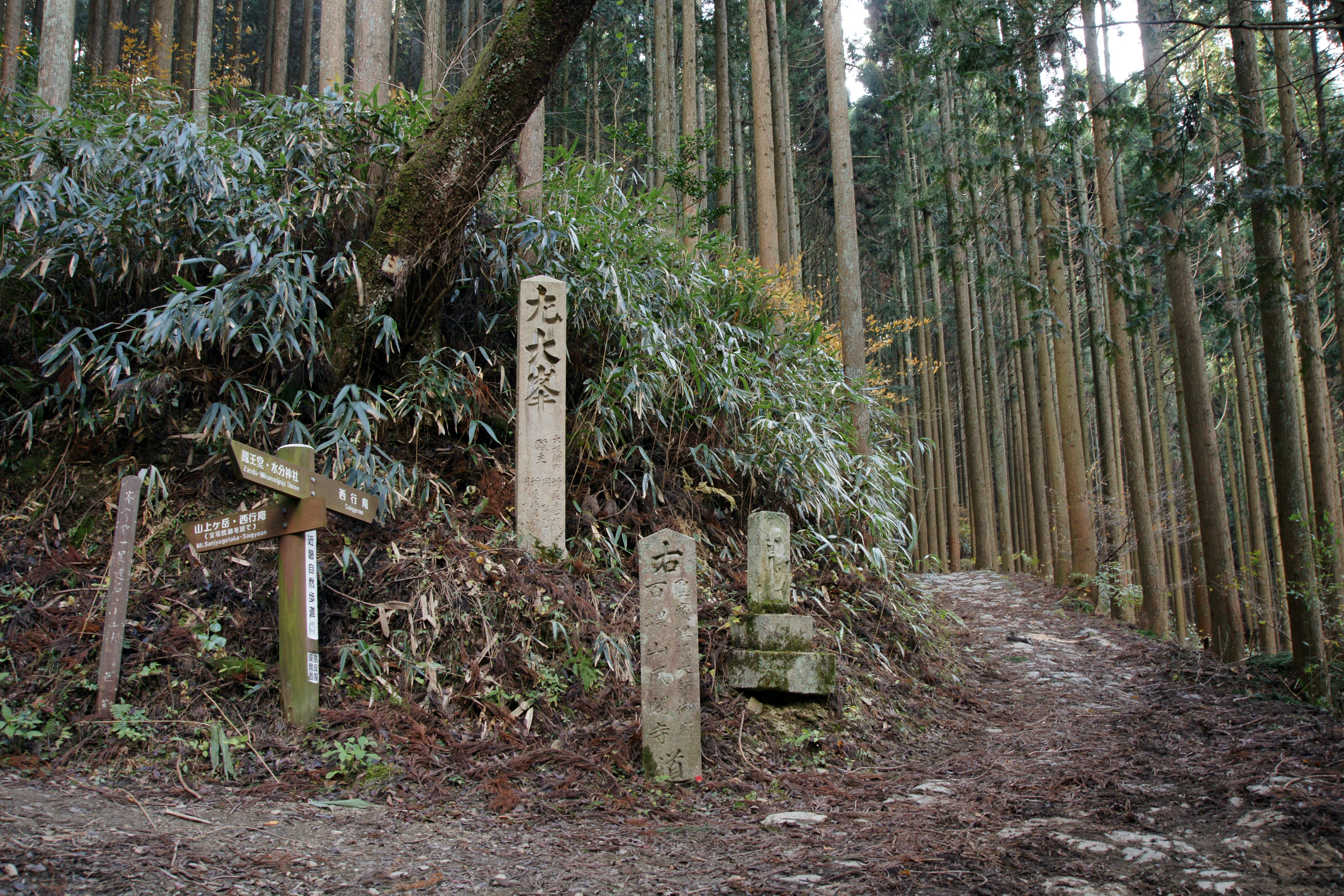
A signpost in Oku-Senbon, Yoshinoyama (Omine Okugando continues from the front to the left, and the right is a branch toward Hyakukaidake)

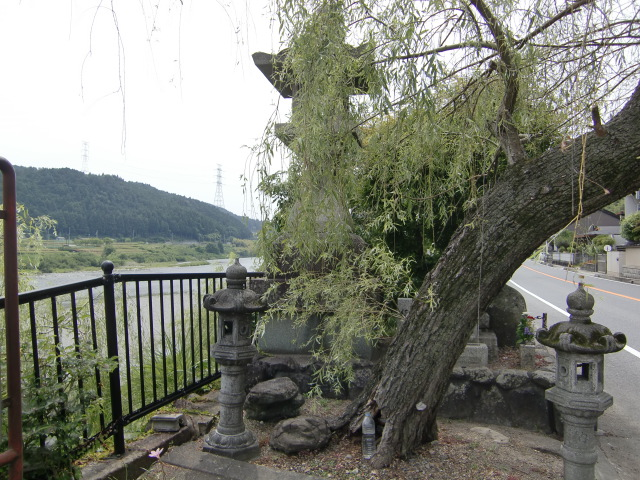
Yanagi-no-watashi

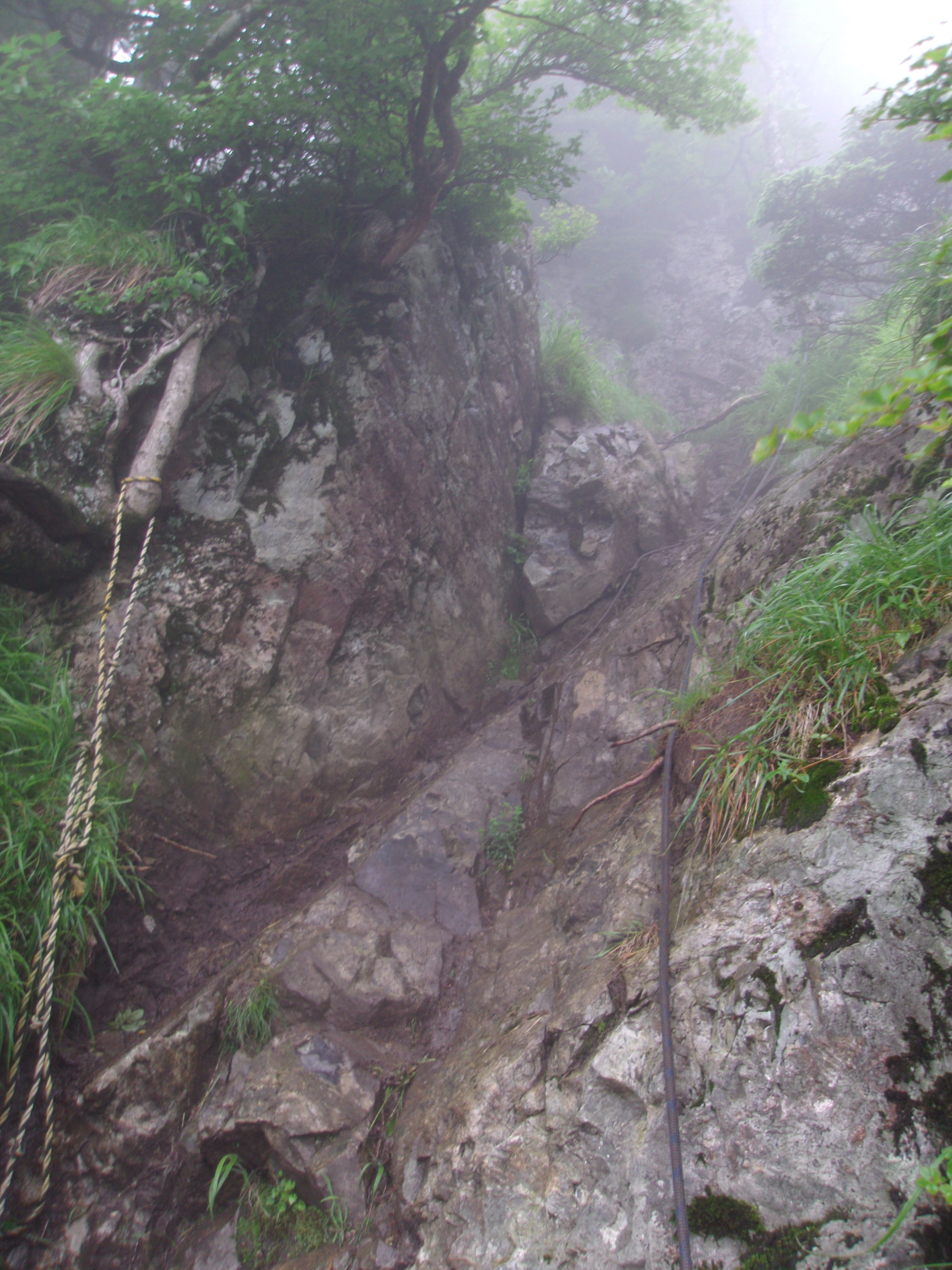
No.47 Zenkisan (route is up the slope, assisted by rope)

== The 75 Nabiki ==
1. Yanagi-no-shuku (柳の宿)
2. Jōrokusan (丈六山)
3. Yoshinosan (吉野山)
4. Mikumari Jinja (水分神社)
5. Kinpujinja (金峯神社)
6. Aizen-no-shuku (愛染の宿)
7. Nizō-no-shuku (二蔵宿)
8. Jōshinmon (浄心門)
9. Sanjōgatake (山上岳)
10. Ozasa-no-shuku (小篠の宿)
11. Amidagamori (阿弥陀森)
12. Waki-no-shuku (脇の宿)
13. Fugendake (普賢岳)
14. Shō-no-iwaya (笙の窟)
15. Mirokudake (弥勒岳)
16. Chigodomari (稚児泊)
17. Shichiyōdake (七曜岳)
18. Gyōjagaeri (行者還)
19. Ichi-no-tawa (一の多和)
20. Ishiyasumi-no-shuku (石休宿)
21. Kōbase-no-shuku (講婆世宿)
22. Misen (弥山)
23. Chōsengatake (朝鮮ヶ岳)
24. Furuimajuku (古今宿)
25. Hakkyōgatake (八経ヶ岳)
26. Myōjōgatake(明星ヶ岳)
27. Kiku-no-iwaya (菊の窟)
28. Zenji-no-mori (禅師の森)
29. Goko-no-mine (五鈷嶺)
30. Fune-no-tawa (舟の多和)
31. Shichimensan (七面山)
32. Yōji-no-shuku (楊枝の宿)
33. Busshōgatake (仏性ヶ岳)
34. Kujakudake (孔雀岳)
35. Kūhachidake (空鉢岳)
36. Shakagatake (釈迦ヶ岳)
37. Totsumon (都津門)
38. Jinsen-no-shuku (深仙宿)
39. Shōten-no-mori (聖天の森)
40. Gokakusen (五角仙)
41. Dainichidake (大日岳)
42. Senjudake (千手岳)
43. Futatsuiwa (二つ岩)
44. Sobakusadake (蘇莫岳)
45. Koike-no-shuku (小池宿)
46. Chigusadake (千草岳)
47. Zenkisan (前鬼山)
48. Zenkisanjūtaki (前鬼三重滝)
49. Okumoridake (奥森岳)
50. Komoridake (子守岳)
51. Hannyadake (般若岳)
52. Nehandake (涅槃岳)
53. Kenkōmon (乾光門)
54. Jikyō-no-shuku (持経宿)
55. Heiji-no-shuku (平治宿)
56. Nuta-no-juku (怒田宿)
57. Gyōsendake (行仙岳)
58. Kasasuteyama (笠捨山)
59. Yarigatake (槍ヶ岳)
60. Shia-no-shuku (四阿宿)
61. Kikugaike (菊ヶ池)
62. Ogamikaeshi (拝返し)
63. Kōshōzan (香精山)
64. Furuya-no-shuku (古屋宿)
65. Nyoijugadake (如意珠岳)
66. Tamakisan (玉置山)
67. Mizunomi-no-shuku (水呑宿)
68. Kishi-no-shuku (岸の宿)
69. Godaisondake (五大尊岳)
70. Kongōtawa (金剛多和)
71. Daigokudake (大黒岳)
72. Fukikoshiyama (吹越山)
73. Shingū (Kumano Hayatama Taisha) (新宮)
74. Nachisan (Kumano Nachi Taisha) (那智山)
75. Hongūtaisha (本宮大社)

== See also ==
- List of Historic Sites of Japan (Nara)
- List of Historic Sites of Japan (Wakayama)

== Literature ==
- Morisawa Yoshinobu: Ōmine Okugakemichi 75 nabiki. Nakanishiya Shuppan, 2006 (森沢義信『大峯奥駈道七十五靡』ナカニシヤ出版) ISBN 4-779-50084-2
- Shugendō shugyōtaikei hensaniinkai: Shugendō shugyōtaikei. Kokusho kankōkai, 1994 (修験道修行大系編纂委員会編『修験道修行大系』国書刊行会) ISBN 4-336-03411-7
- Swanson, Paul L.: Shugendō and the Yoshino-Kumano Pilgrimage - An Example of Mountain Pilgrimage. In: Monumenta Nipponica, Vol. 36, No. 1 (1981), S. 55–84.
