= Sacred Sites and Pilgrimage Routes in the Kii Mountain Range =

UNESCO World Heritage Site

UNESCO World Heritage Site
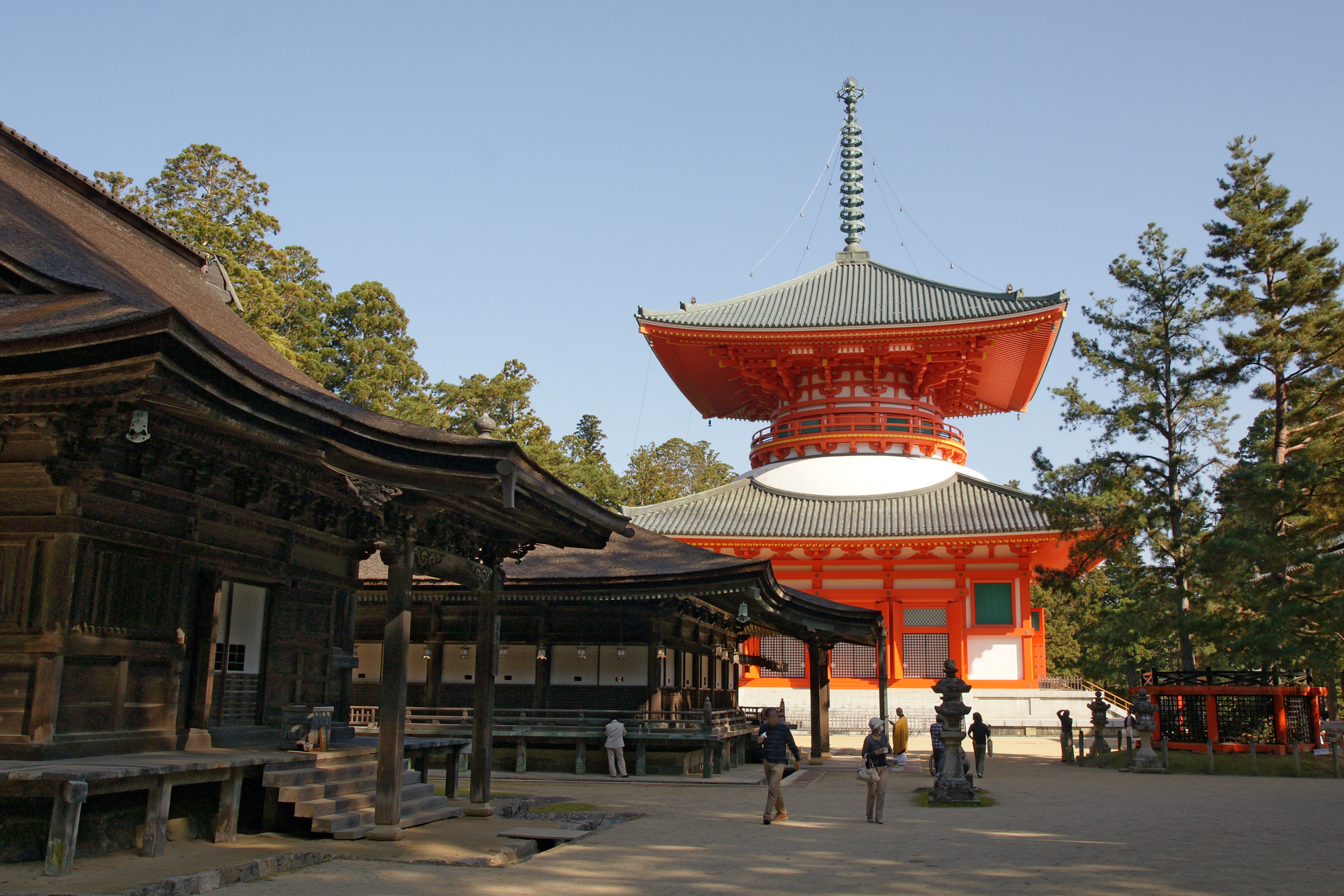
- Mount Kōya (Kōyasan)
- Interactive map of Sacred Sites and Pilgrimage Routes in the Kii Mountain Range
- Location: Kii Peninsula, Japan
- Criteria: Cultural: (ii), (iii), (iv), (vi)
- Reference: 1142bis
- Inscription: 2004 (28th Session)
- Extensions: 2016
- Area: 506.4 ha (1,251 acres)
- Buffer zone: 12,100 ha (30,000 acres)
- Coordinates: 33°50′13″N 135°46′35″E

Sacred Sites and Pilgrimage Routes in the Kii Mountain Range is a UNESCO World Heritage Site located on the Kii Peninsula in Japan.

== Selection criteria ==
The locations and paths for this heritage site were based on their historical and modern importance in religious pilgrimages. It was also noted for its fusion of Shinto and Buddhist beliefs, and a well documented history of traditions over 1,200 years. The nature scenery on the Kii peninsula was also taken into consideration, with its many streams, rivers and waterfalls. Technically, independent structures at nominated temples and shrines were nominated for this distinction, and not the entire establishments. Sections of the trails were included for this nomination, but not the full length of their expanses. A total of 242 elements were selected from sites and pilgrimage routes for nomination.

== List of sites ==
| Area | Cultural asset | Type | Location | Picture |
|---|---|---|---|---|
| Yoshino and Ōmine | Mount Yoshino (吉野山, Yoshino-yama) | Mountain | Yoshino-chō, Yoshino-gun, Nara-ken | |
| Yoshino and Ōmine | Yoshino Mikumari Shrine (吉野水分神社, Yoshino-mikumari-jinja) | Shinto shrine | Yoshino-chō, Yoshino-gun, Nara-ken | |
| Yoshino and Ōmine | Kimpu Shrine (金峯神社, Kimpu-jinja) | Shinto shrine | Yoshino-chō, Yoshino-gun, Nara-ken | |
| Yoshino and Ōmine | Kimpusen-ji (金峯山寺, Kimpusen-ji) | Shugendō/Buddhist temple | Yoshino-chō, Yoshino-gun, Nara-ken | |
| Yoshino and Ōmine | Yoshimizu Shrine (吉水神社, Yoshimizu-jinja) | Shinto shrine | Yoshino-chō, Yoshino-gun, Nara-ken | |
| Yoshino and Ōmine | Ōminesan-ji (大峯山寺, Ōminesan-ji) | Shugendō temple | Tenkawa-mura, Yoshino-gun, Nara-ken | |
| Kumano Sanzan | Kumano Hongū Taisha (熊野本宮大社, Kumano Hongū Taisha) | Shinto shrine | Tanabe-shi, Wakayama-ken | |
| Kumano Sanzan | Kumano Hayatama Taisha (熊野速玉大社, Kumano Hayatama Taisha) | Shinto shrine | Shingū-shi, Wakayama-ken; Kiho-chō, Minamimuro-gun, Mie-ken | |
| Kumano Sanzan | Kumano Nachi Taisha (熊野那智大社, Kumano Nachi Taisha) | Shinto shrine | Nachikatsuura-chō, Higashimuro-gun, Wakayama-ken | |
| Kumano Sanzan | Seiganto-ji (青岸渡寺, Seiganto-ji) | Tendai Buddhist temple | Nachikatsuura-chō, Higashimuro-gun, Wakayama-ken | |
| Kumano Sanzan | Nachi Falls (那智滝, Nachi no Taki) | Waterfall | Nachikatsuura-chō, Higashimuro-gun, Wakayama-ken | |
| Kumano Sanzan | Nachi Primeval Forest (那智原始林, Nachi Genjirin) | Forest | Nachikatsuura-chō, Higashimuro-gun, Wakayama-ken | |
| Kumano Sanzan | Fudarakusan-ji (補陀洛山寺, Fudarakusan-ji) | Tendai Buddhist temple | Nachikatsuura-chō, Higashimuro-gun, Wakayama-ken | |
| Kōyasan | Niutsuhime Shrine (丹生都比売神社, Niutsuhime-jinja) | Shinto shrine | Katsuragi-chō, Ito-gun, Wakayama-ken | |
| Kōyasan | Kongōbu-ji (金剛峯寺, Kongōbu-ji) | Shingon Buddhist temple | Kōya-chō, Ito-gun, Wakayama-ken | |
| Kōyasan | Jison-in (慈尊院, Jison-in) | Shingon Buddhist temple | Kudoyama-chō, Ito-gun, Wakayama-ken | |
| Kōyasan | Niukanshōfu Shrine (丹生官省符神社, Niukanshōfu-jinja) | Shinto shrine | Kudoyama-chō, Ito-gun, Wakayama-ken | |
| Pilgrimage Routes | Ōmine Okugakemichi (大峯奥駈道, Ōmine Okugakemichi) | Trail | Villages between Nara and Wakayama prefectures | |
| Pilgrimage Routes | Kumano Sankeimichi (熊野参詣道): Nakahechi (中辺路), including Kumano River (熊野川); Kohechi (小辺路); Ōhechi (大辺路); Iseji (伊勢路) | Trail | Across Mie and Wakayama prefectures | |
| Pilgrimage Routes | Kōyasan chōishi-michi (高野山町石道, Kōyasan Chōishimichi) | Trail | Villages in Ito-gun, Wakayama-ken | |

== See also ==
- Tourism in Japan
- List of World Heritage Sites in Japan
