= Yoshimizu Shrine =

Shinto shrine in Nara Prefecture, Japan

Yoshimizu-jinja 吉水神社
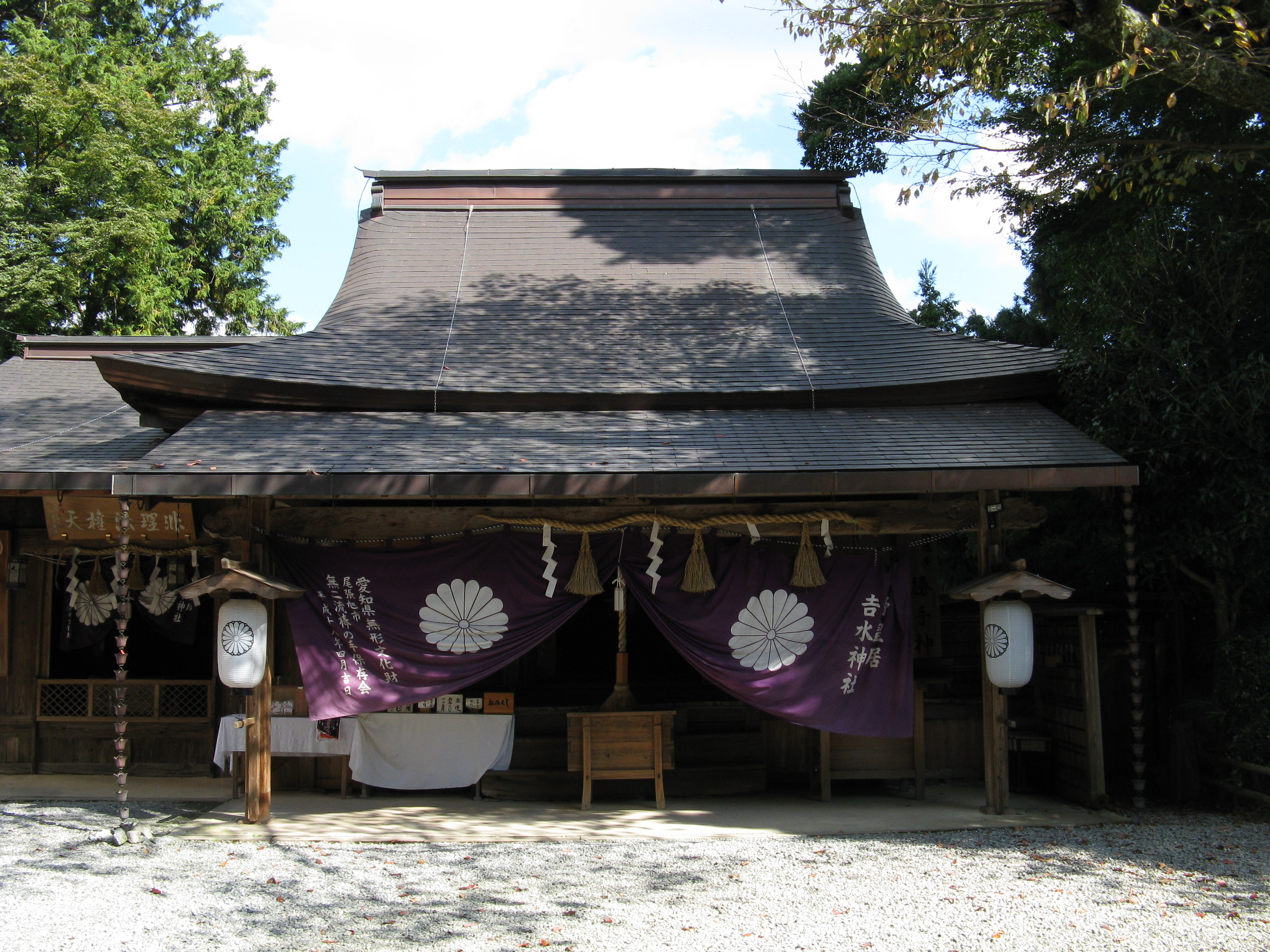
- The haiden, or prayer hall

- Location within Japan

Religion
- Affiliation: Shinto
- Deity: Emperor Go-Daigo, Kusunoki Masashige

Location
- Location: Yoshino-yama, Yoshino-chō Yoshino-gun, Nara-ken
- Interactive map of Yoshimizu-jinja 吉水神社
- Coordinates: 34°22′03.5″N 135°51′42.75″E

Website
- www.yoshimizu-shrine.com

Yoshimizu Shrine (吉水神社, Yoshimizu-jinja) is a Shinto shrine located on Mount Yoshino in Yoshino district, Nara, Japan. It is dedicated to Emperor Go-Daigo, and the samurai Kusunoki Masashige.

In 2004, it was designated as part of a UNESCO World Heritage Site under the name Sacred Sites and Pilgrimage Routes in the Kii Mountain Range. In 2014 the temple was embroiled in a scandal when it was discovered that head priest Satō Kazuhiko's private blog contained extreme hate speech towards Chinese and Koreans, in addition to him being the head of a local right-wing extremist group.

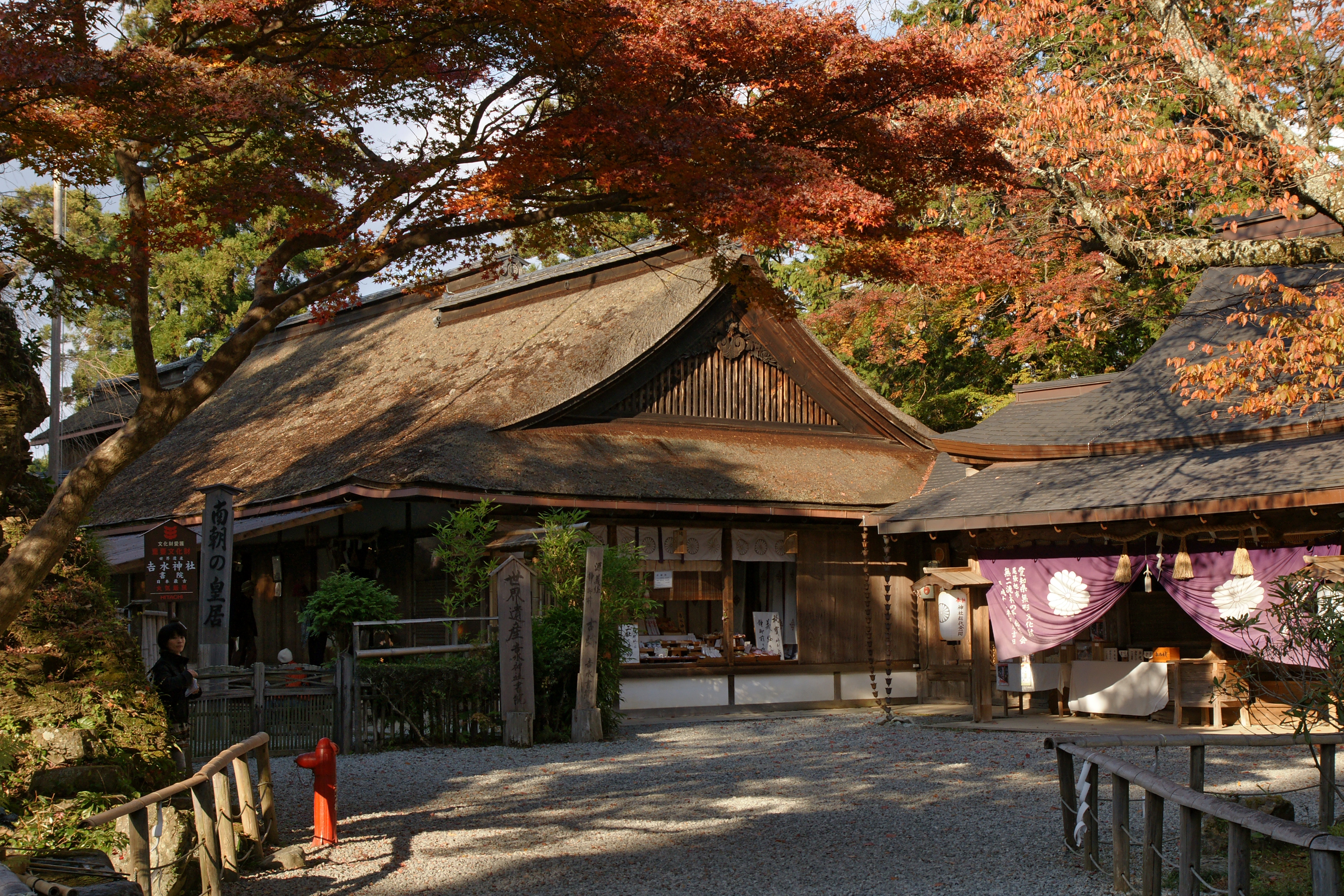
Shoin (Important Cultural Property of Japan)
