= Yoshino Mikumari Shrine =

Shinto shrine in Nara Prefecture, Japan

Yoshino Mikumari-jinja 吉野水分神社
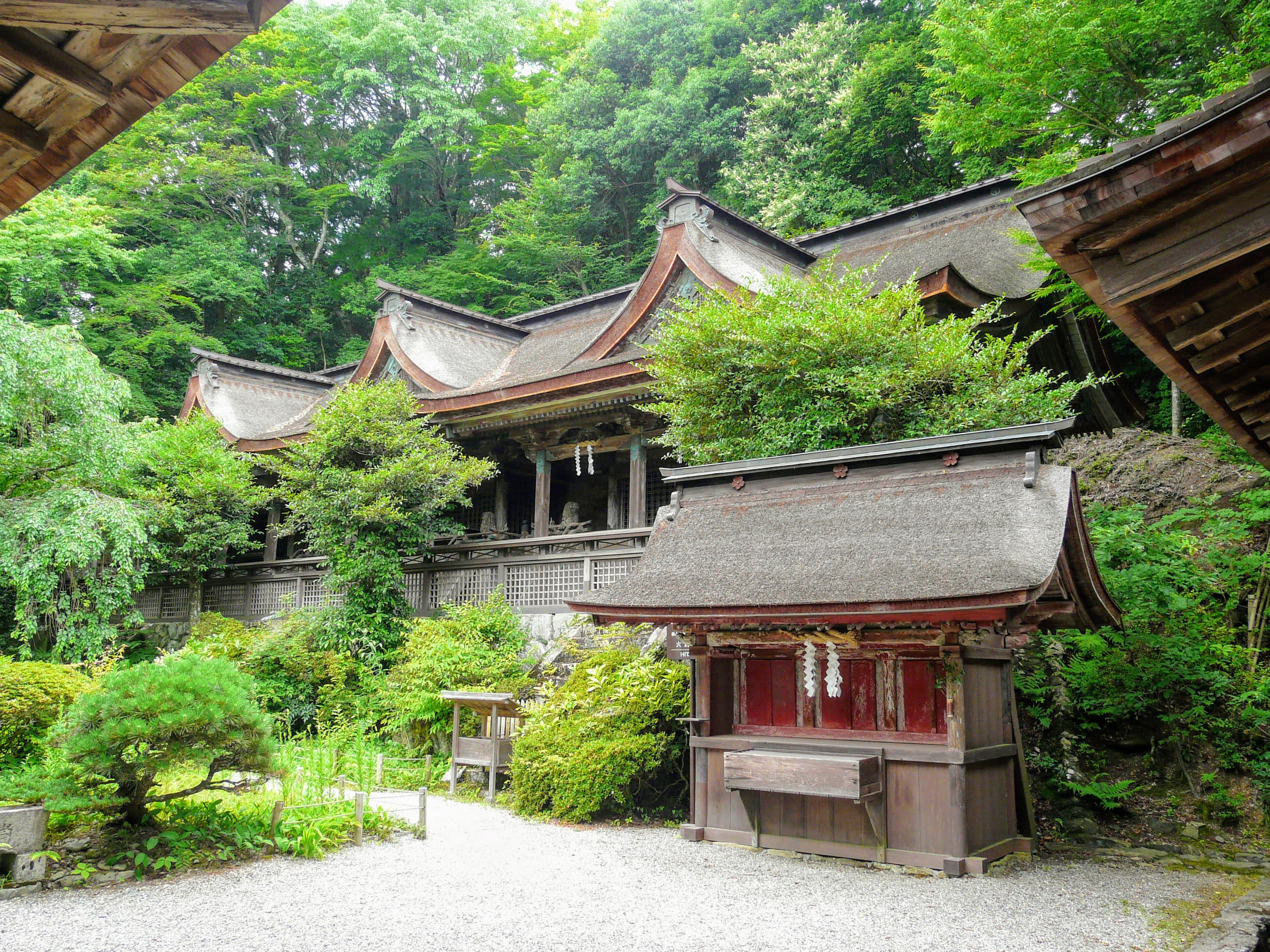
- The honden, or main hall, is an Important Cultural Property

- Location within Japan

Religion
- Affiliation: Shinto
- Deity: Ame-no-mikumari-no-kami (main deity)

Location
- Location: 1612 Yoshino-yama, Yoshino-chō Yoshino-gun, Nara-ken
- Interactive map of Yoshino Mikumari-jinja 吉野水分神社
- Coordinates: 34°21′14″N 135°52′23″E

Architecture
- Established: Unknown, possibly 806

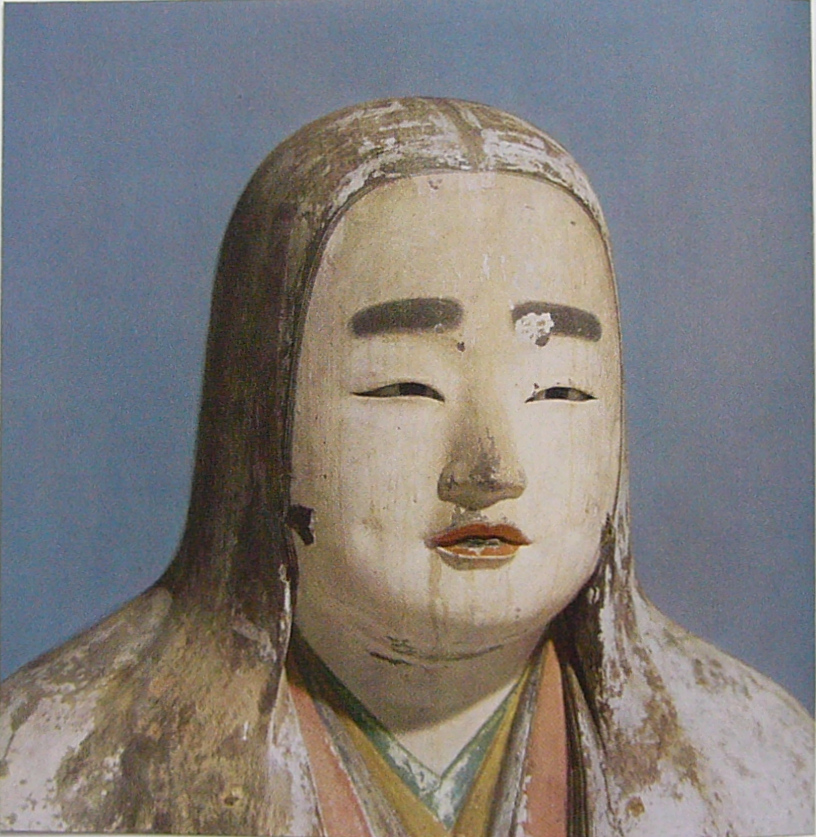
Tamayori-hime (princess Tamayori)

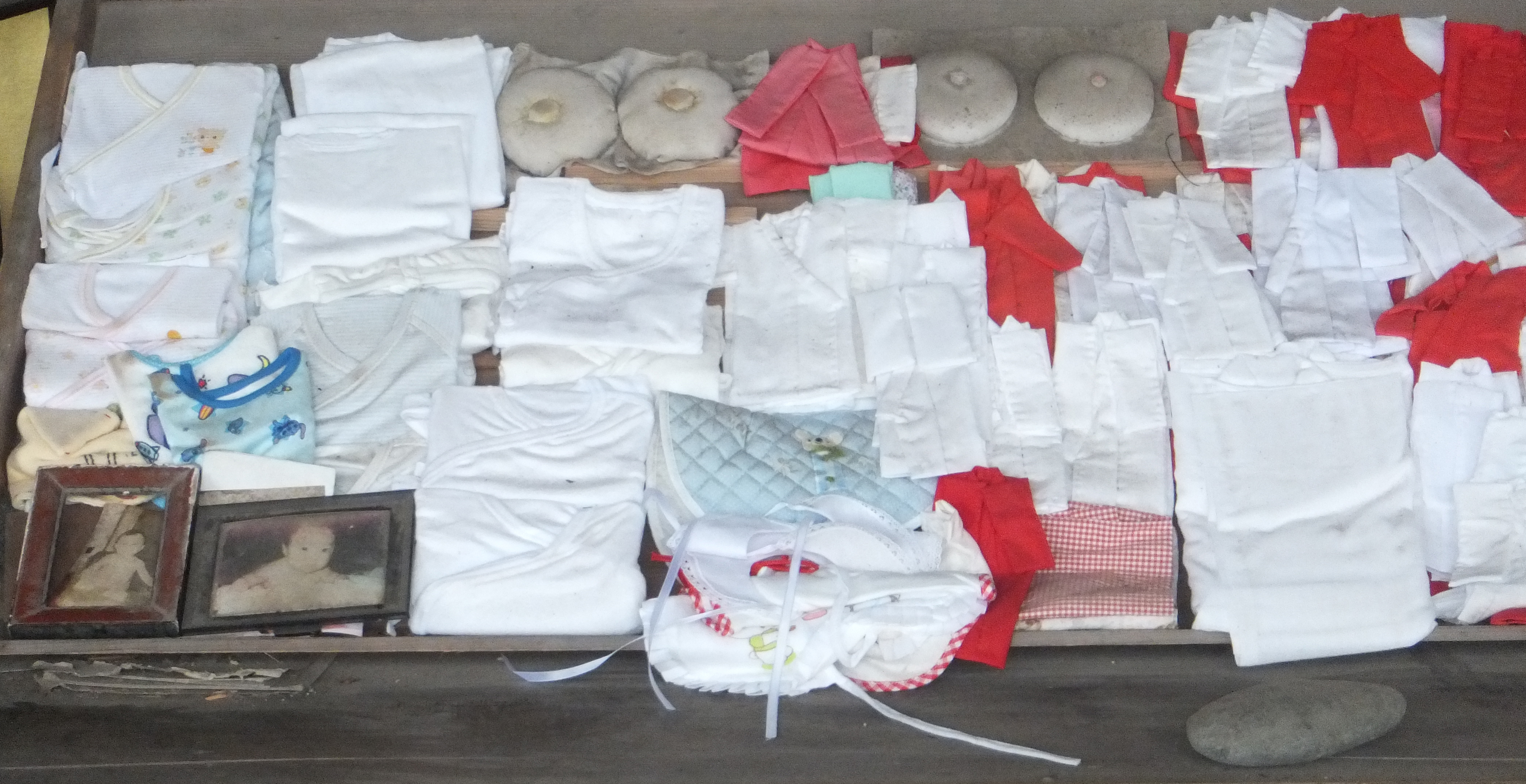
Votive offerings

Yoshino Mikumari Shrine (吉野水分神社, Yoshino Mikumari-jinja) is a Shinto shrine located on Mount Yoshino in Yoshino district, Nara, Japan. It is closely associated with Emperor Go-Daigo.

== The Shrine’s deity ==
The Shrine is dedicated to mikumari, a female Shinto kami associated with water, fertility and safe birth. Yoshino Mikumari Shrine is one of four important mikumari shrines in the former province Yamato. The shrine also houses six kami that are more or less related to mikumari (Takami-musubi-no-kami, Sukuna-hiko-no-kami, Mikogami, Ama-tsu-hiko-hi-no-ninigi-no-mikoto, Tamayori-hime-no-mikoto, and Yorozu-hata-toyo-akitsushi-hime-no-mikoto). A wooden statue of the deity Tamayori hime is registered as a National Treasure of Japan.

== Shrine buildings ==
The present-day buildings go back to 1605, when Toyotomi Hideyori rebuilt the shrine, as his father Toyotomi Hideyoshi once had prayed here for a son and successor. The main hall (honden), an Important Cultural Property, is an unusual structure 9 ken long and 2 ken wide. Built in the nagare-zukuri style, it has however an independent 1x1 ken unit in the kasuga-zukuri style at the center. The three resulting edifices all lie under the same bark roof, which has three dormer gables.

In 2004, the shrine was designated as part of a UNESCO World Heritage Site under the name Sacred Sites and Pilgrimage Routes in the Kii Mountain Range.

== See also ==
- List of Shinto shrines
- Twenty-Two Shrines
- List of National Treasures of Japan (sculptures)
- Modern system of ranked Shinto Shrines
