= Kinpu Shrine =

Shinto shrine in Nara Prefecture, Japan

Kinpu Shrine 金峯神社
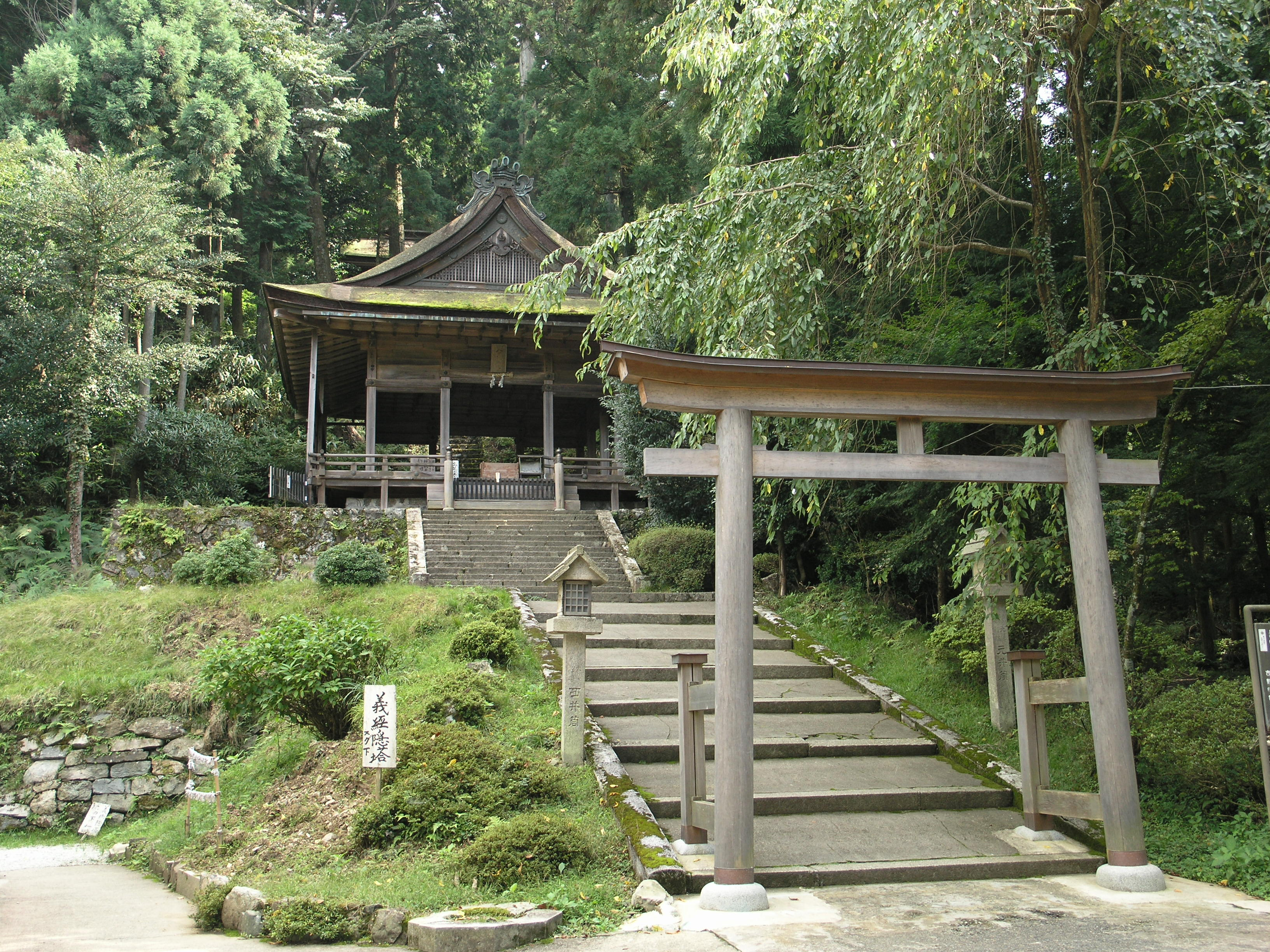
- Torii gate in front of the haiden, or prayer hall

- Location within Japan

Religion
- Affiliation: Shinto
- Deity: Kanayama-hiko-no-kami

Location
- Location: 1651 Yoshino-yama, Yoshino-chō Yoshino-gun, Nara-ken
- Interactive map of Kinpu Shrine 金峯神社
- Coordinates: 34°20′34″N 135°52′54″E

Architecture
- Established: Unknown, recorded around 10th century

Kinpu Shrine (金峯神社, Kinpu-jinja) is a Shinto shrine located in Yoshino district, Nara Prefecture, Japan. The honden, or main hall, is constructed in the nagare-zukuri style.

In 2004, it was designated as part of a UNESCO World Heritage Site under the name Sacred Sites and Pilgrimage Routes in the Kii Mountain Range.
