= Kimpusen-ji =

Shugendō temple in Nara Prefecture, Japan

Coordinates: 34°22′5.71″N 135°51′29.40″E

Kinpusen-ji 金峯山寺
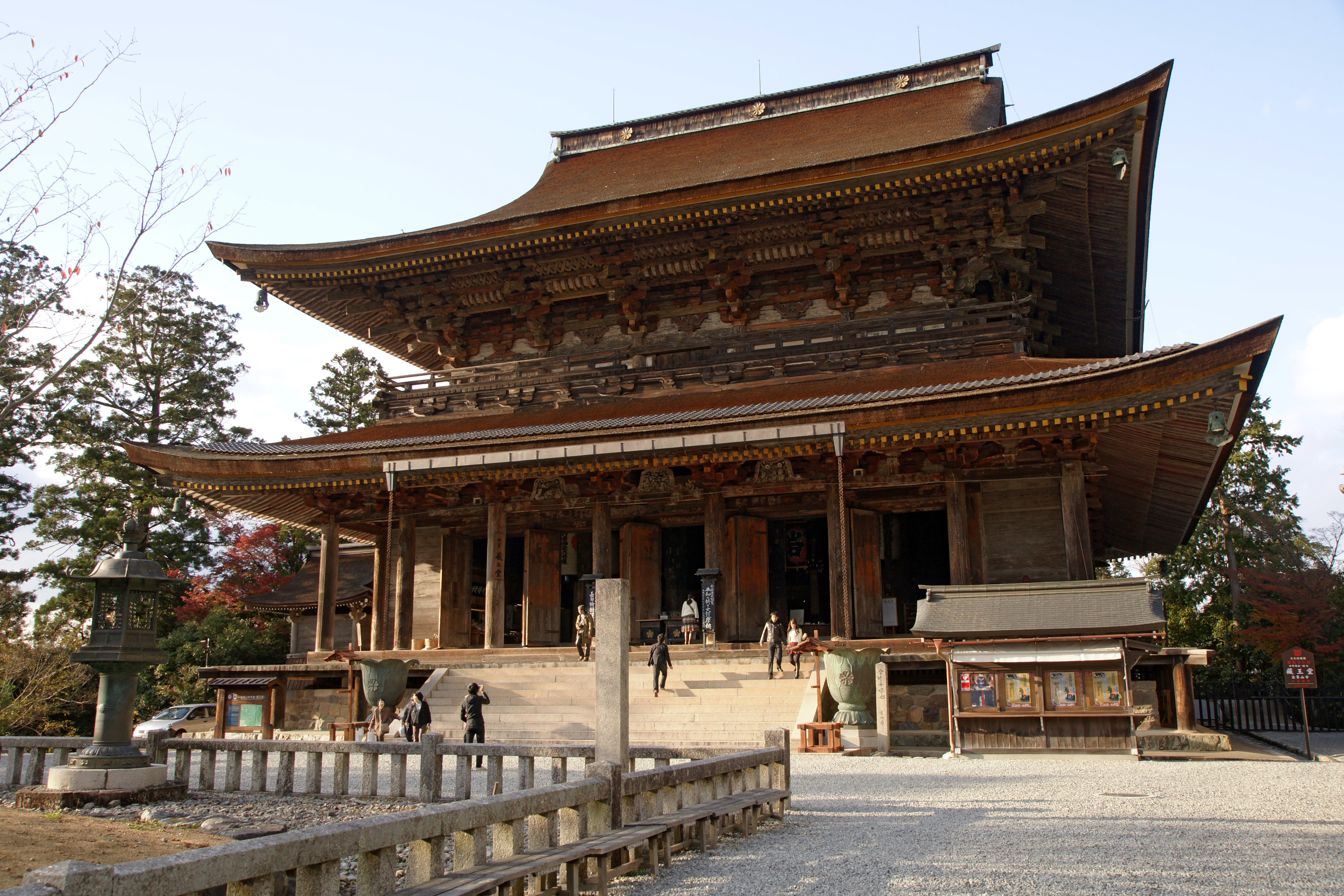
- "Zaō-Hall" (Zaōdō), a National Treasure

Religion
- Affiliation: Kinpusen-Shugendō
- Deity: Zaō gongen (蔵王権現)

Location
- Location: 2498 Mount Yoshino, Yoshino, Yoshino district, Nara Prefecture
- Country: Japan
- Interactive map of Kinpusen-ji 金峯山寺

Architecture
- Founder: En no Gyōja
- Completed: Second half of 7th century

Website
- http://www.kinpusen.or.jp/ In Japanese

Kinpusen-ji (金峯山寺, Kinpusen-ji) is the head temple of a branch of the Shugendō religion called Kinpusen-Shugendō in Yoshino district, Nara Prefecture, Japan. According to tradition, it was founded by En no Gyōja, who propagated a form of mountain asceticism drawing from Shinto, Taoism and Buddhist beliefs. Along with Ōminesan-ji Temple, it is considered the most important temple in Shugendō.

The temple's main building, the "Zaō-Hall" (Zaōdō) dedicated to Zaō gongen (蔵王権現), is the second largest wooden structure in Japan after the Great Buddha Hall at Tōdai-ji in Nara. Kinpusen-ji is a junction in a series of stops on pilgrimage routes.

A Shinto shrine dedicated to Inari Ōkami is attached to the main compound. In 1963, the Temple constructed a hall named Southern Court Mystic Law Hall (Nanchō Myōhōden) to appease the soul of the four emperors of the Southern Court and others who lost their lives in many battles since the "Northern and Southern Courts period" (Nanboku-chō period, 1336–1392). The principal image is the statue of Gautama Buddha (Shaka Nyōrai).

In 2004, it was designated as part of a UNESCO World Heritage Site under the name Sacred Sites and Pilgrimage Routes in the Kii Mountain Range.

== Images ==
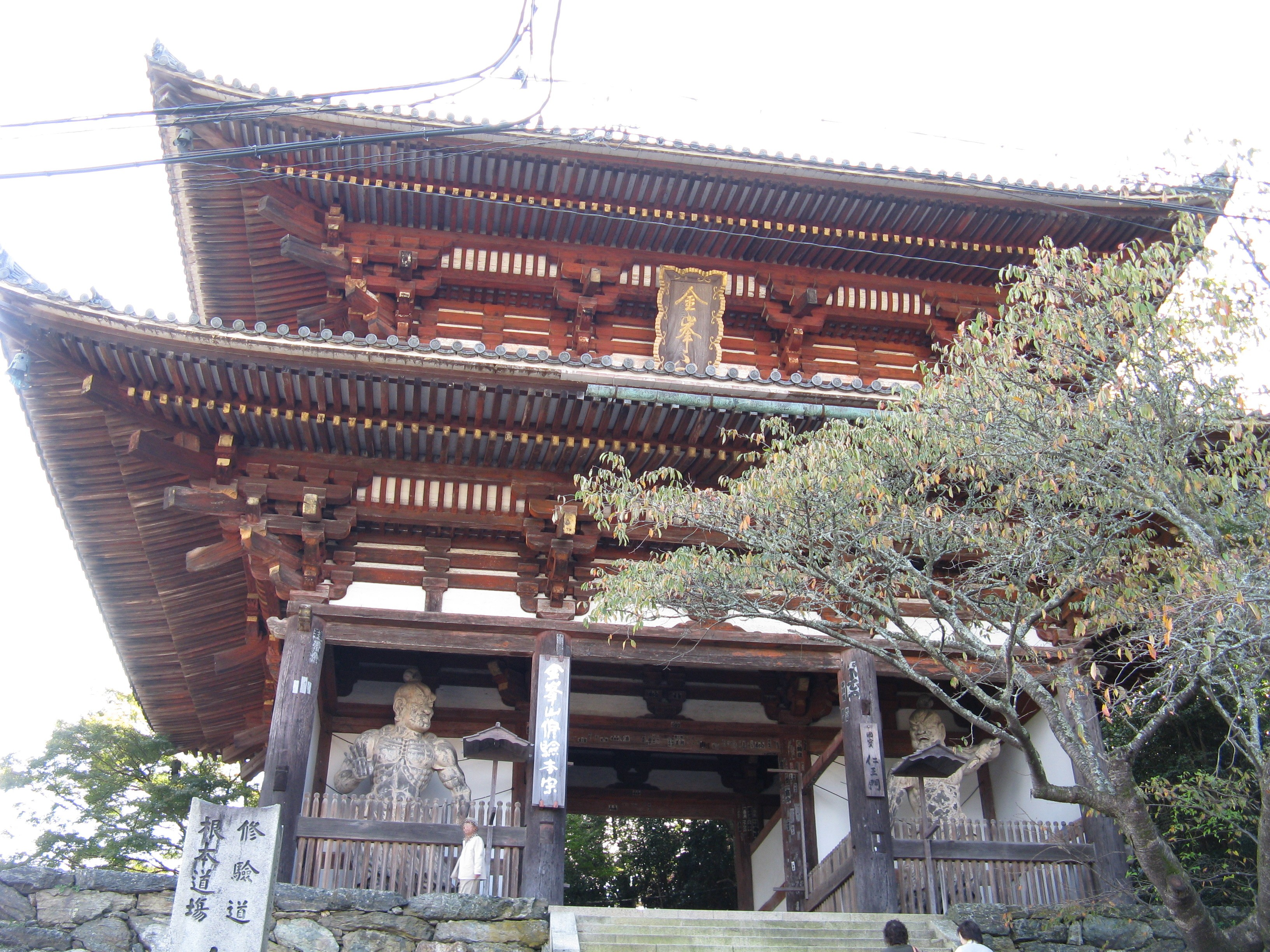
Gate with guardians

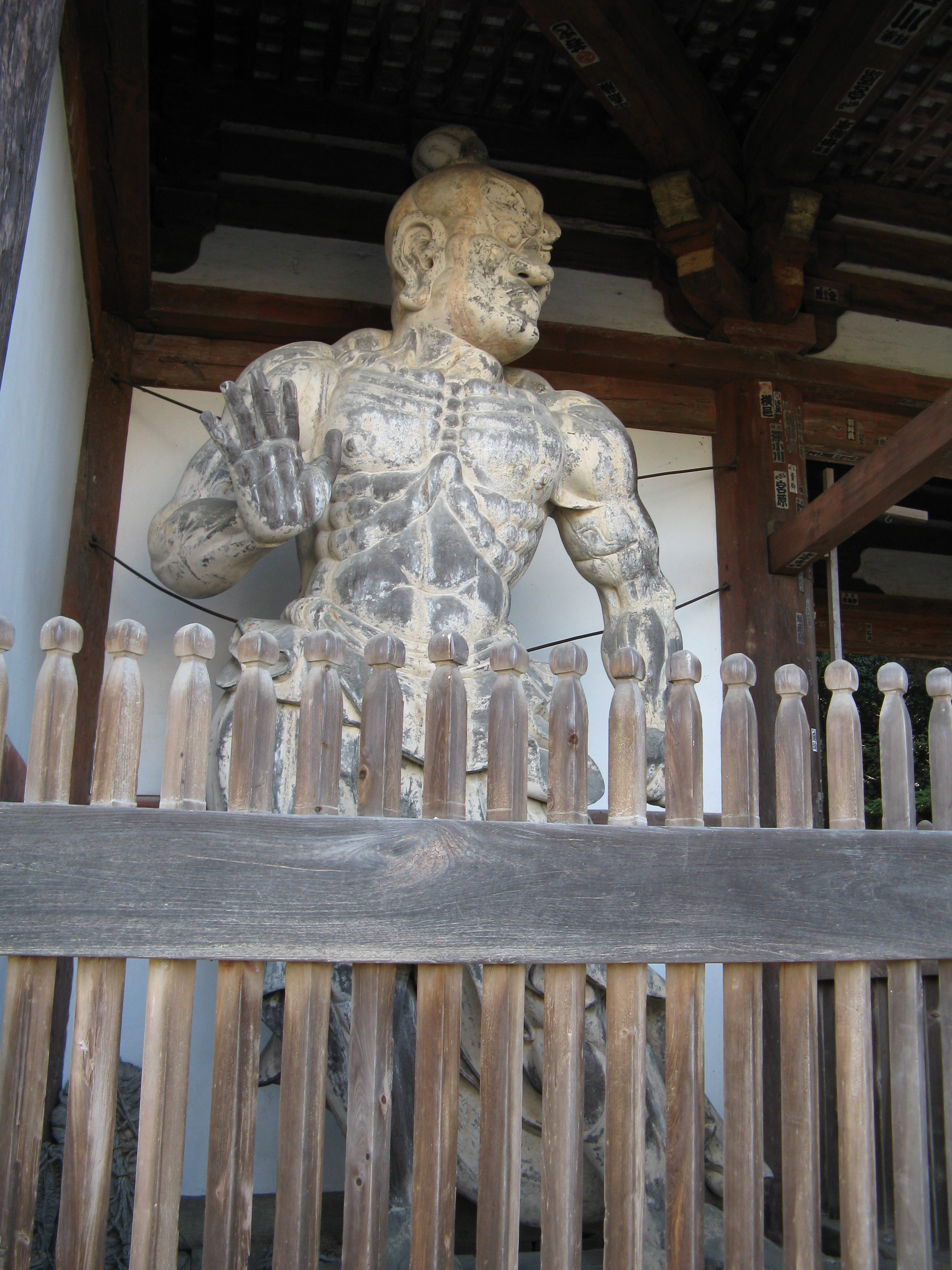
Statue of the wrath-filled and muscular guardian Nio

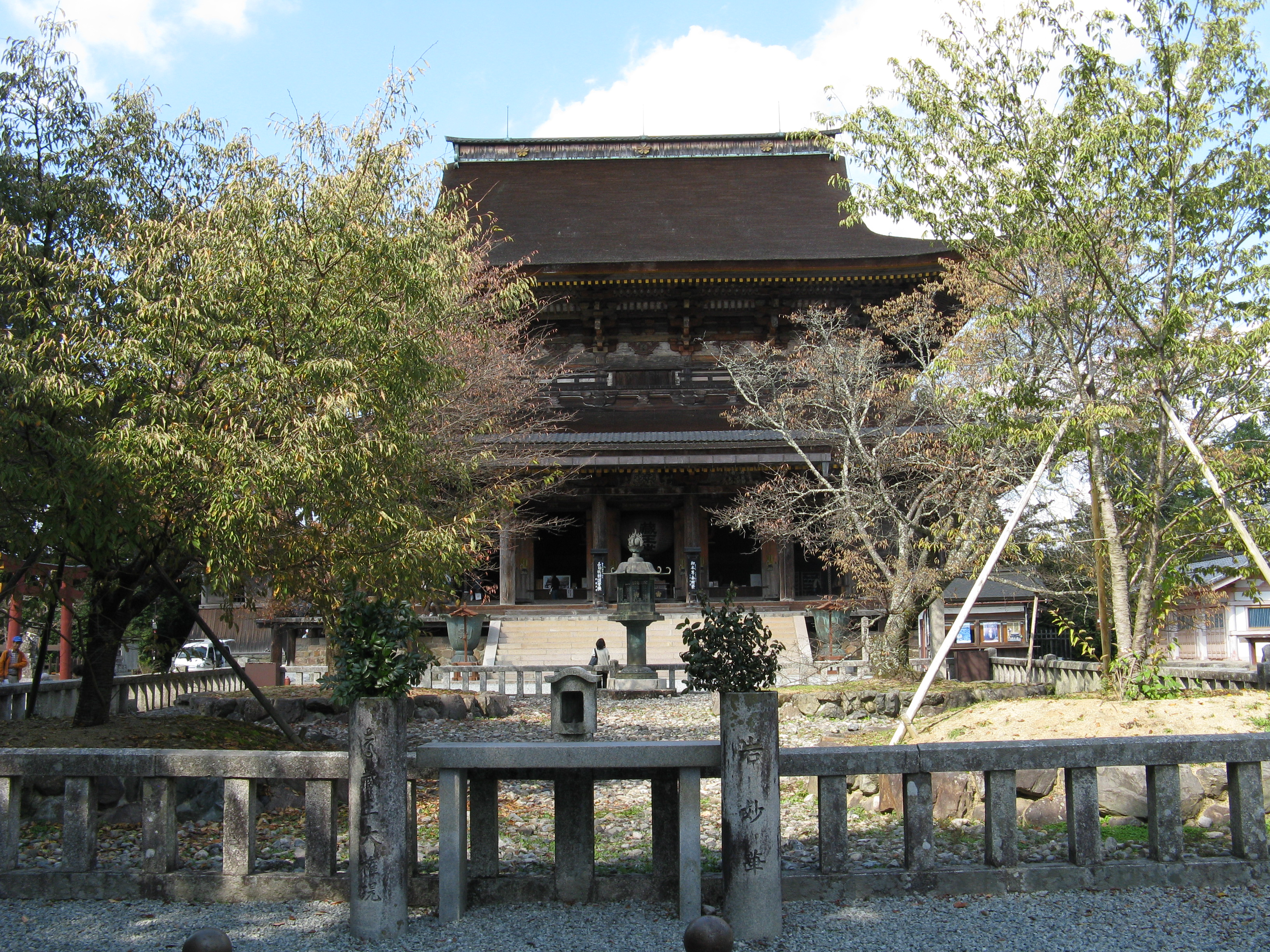
Zaōdō (Deity: Zaō gongen, "Avatar Zaō")

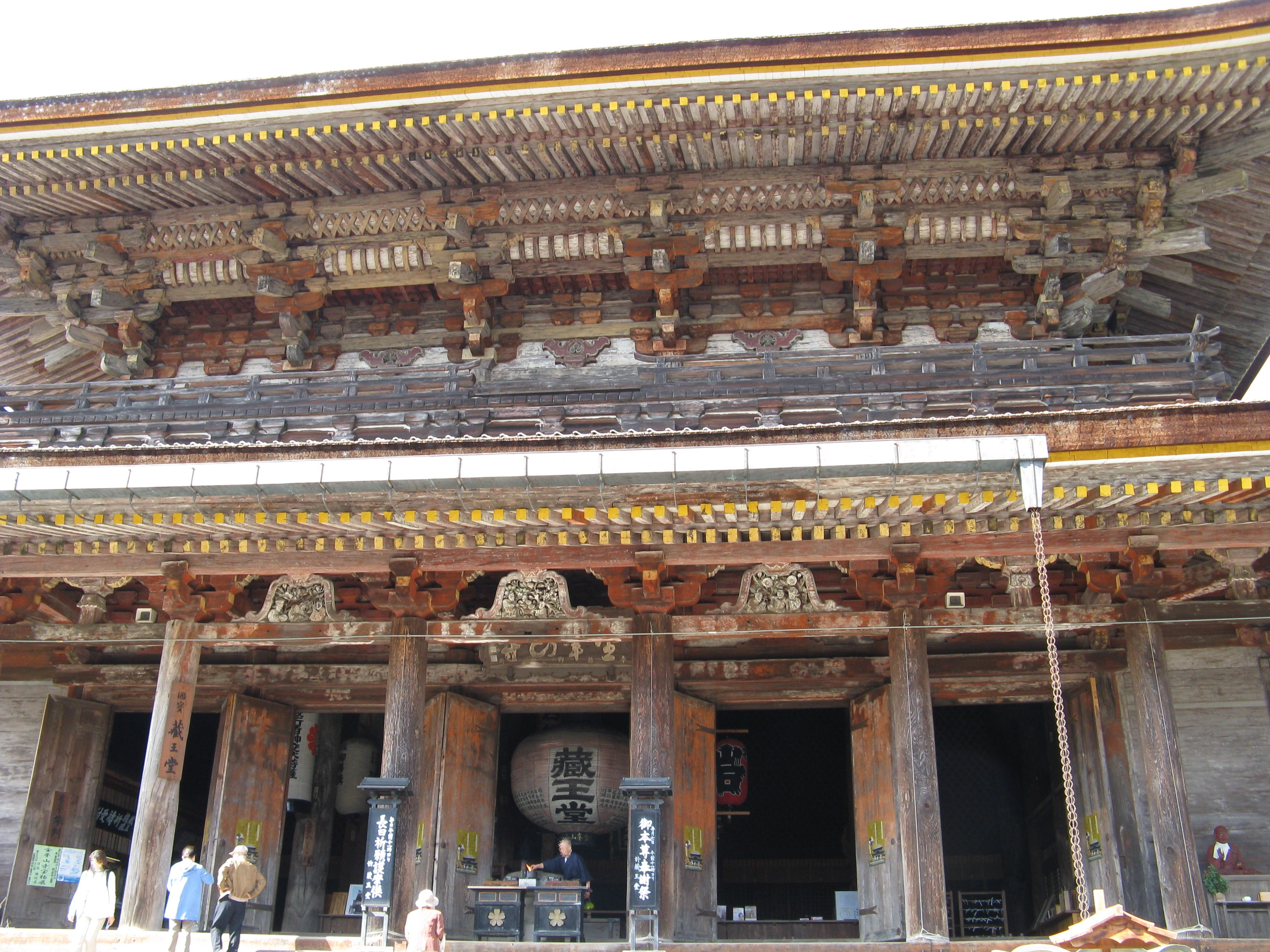
entrance of Zaōdō

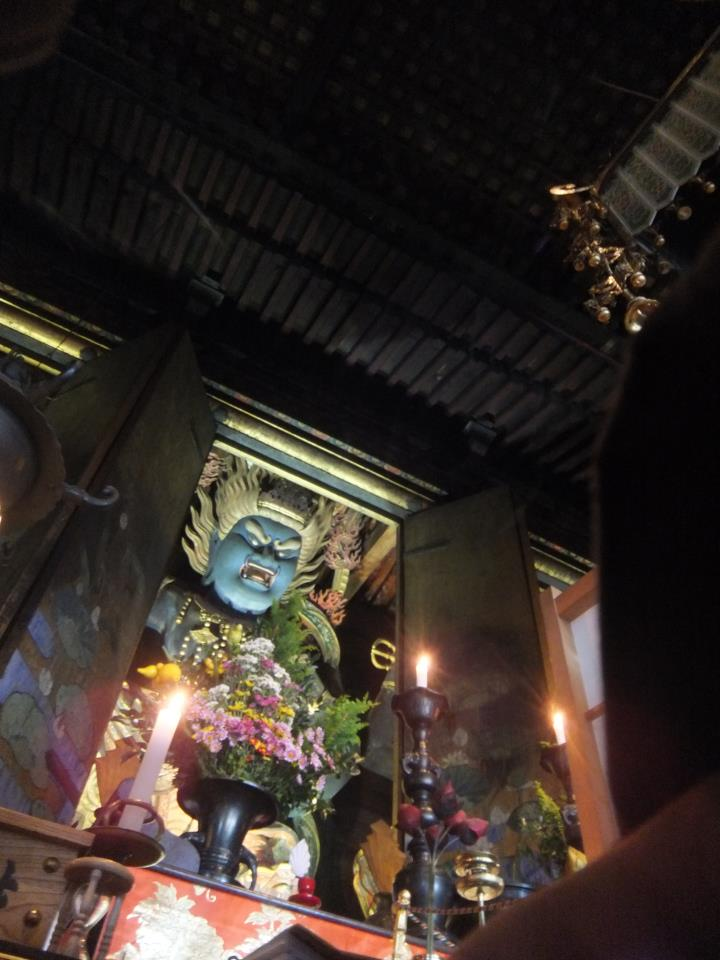
one of the three Zaō-gongen statues in the Zaōdō

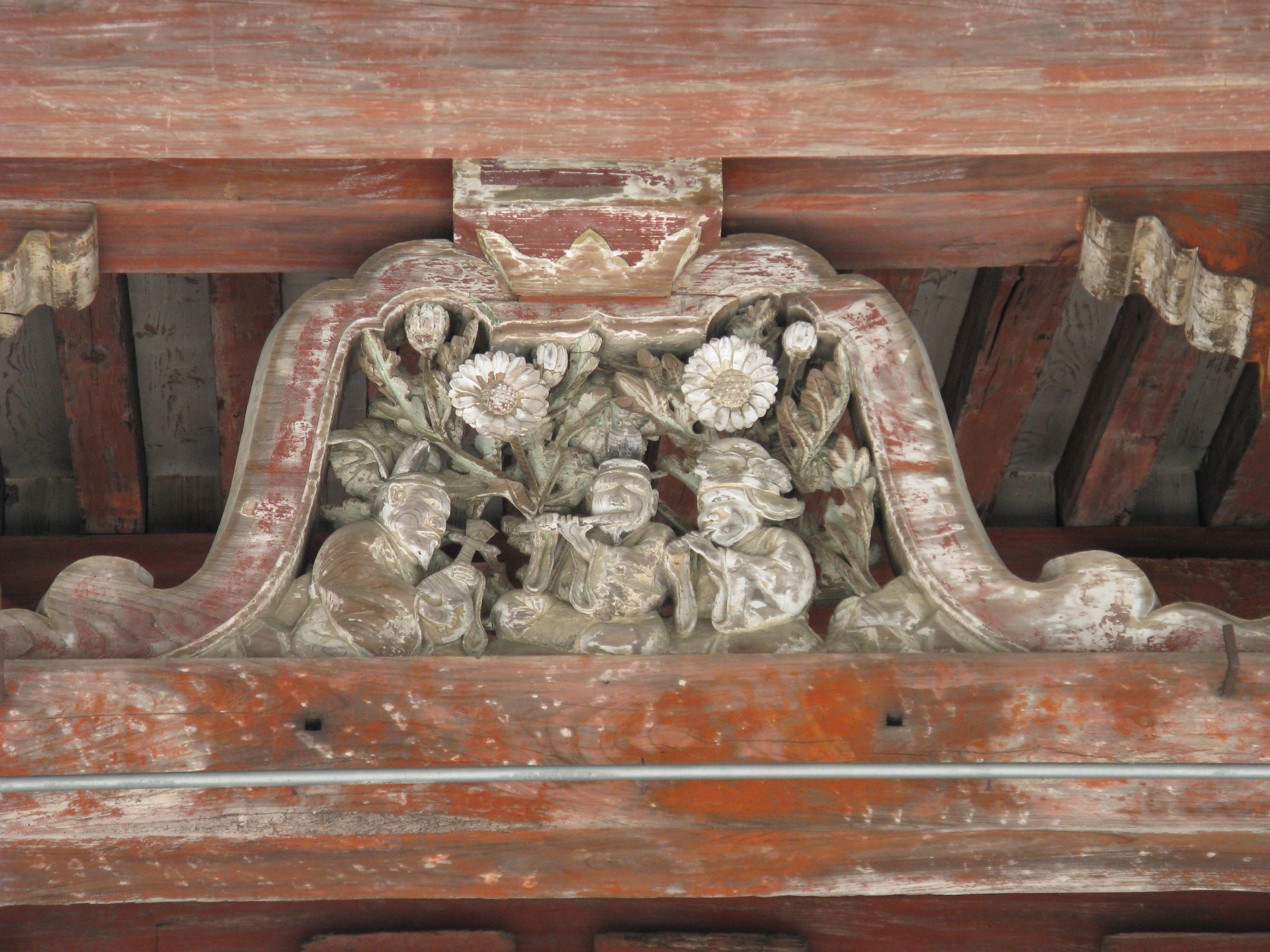
carvings

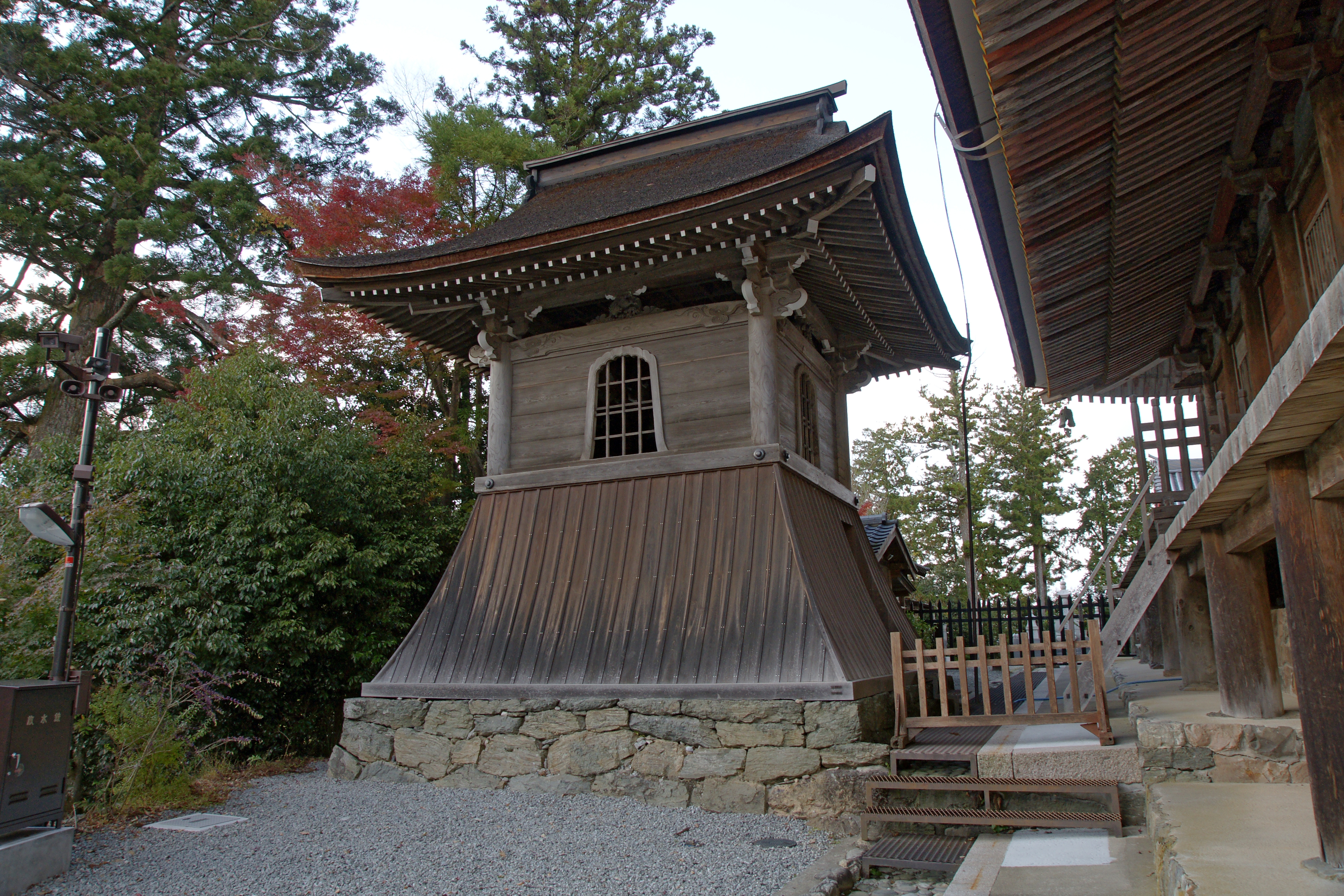
Bell tower (Shorō)

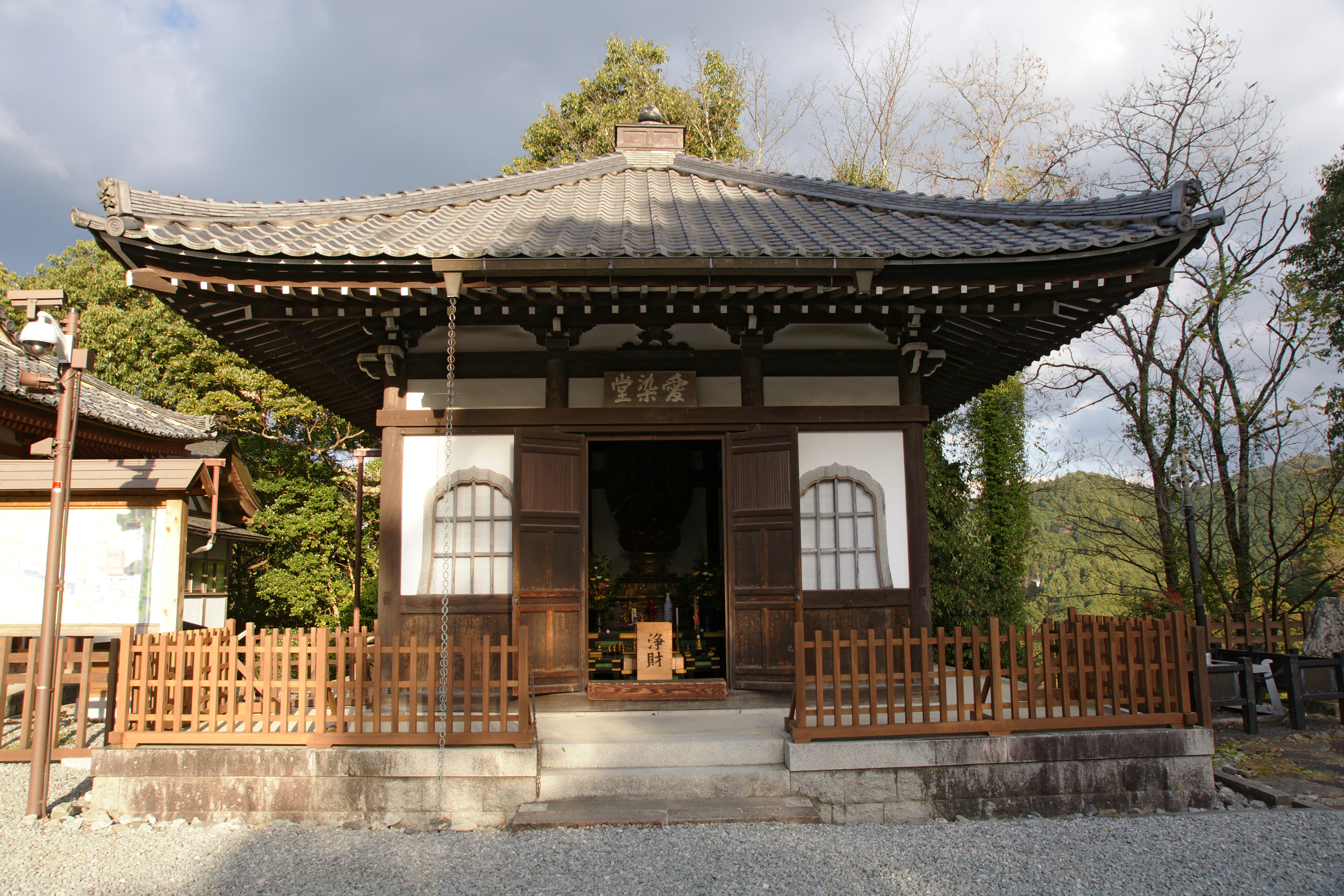
Aizendō (deity: Aizen myōō, Sanskr. Rāgarāja)

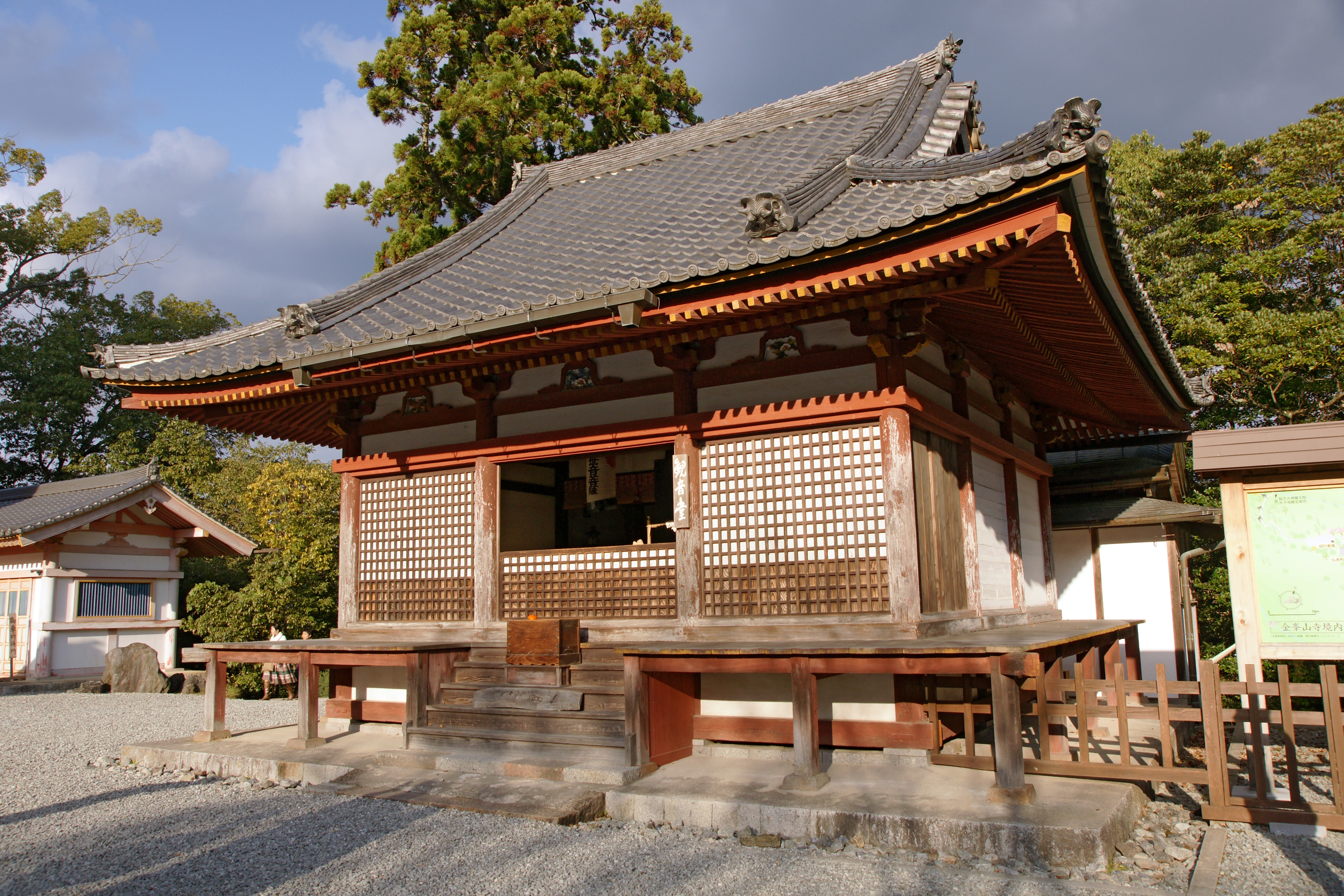
Kannondō (deity: Kannon bosatsu, "Bodhisattva Guanyin")

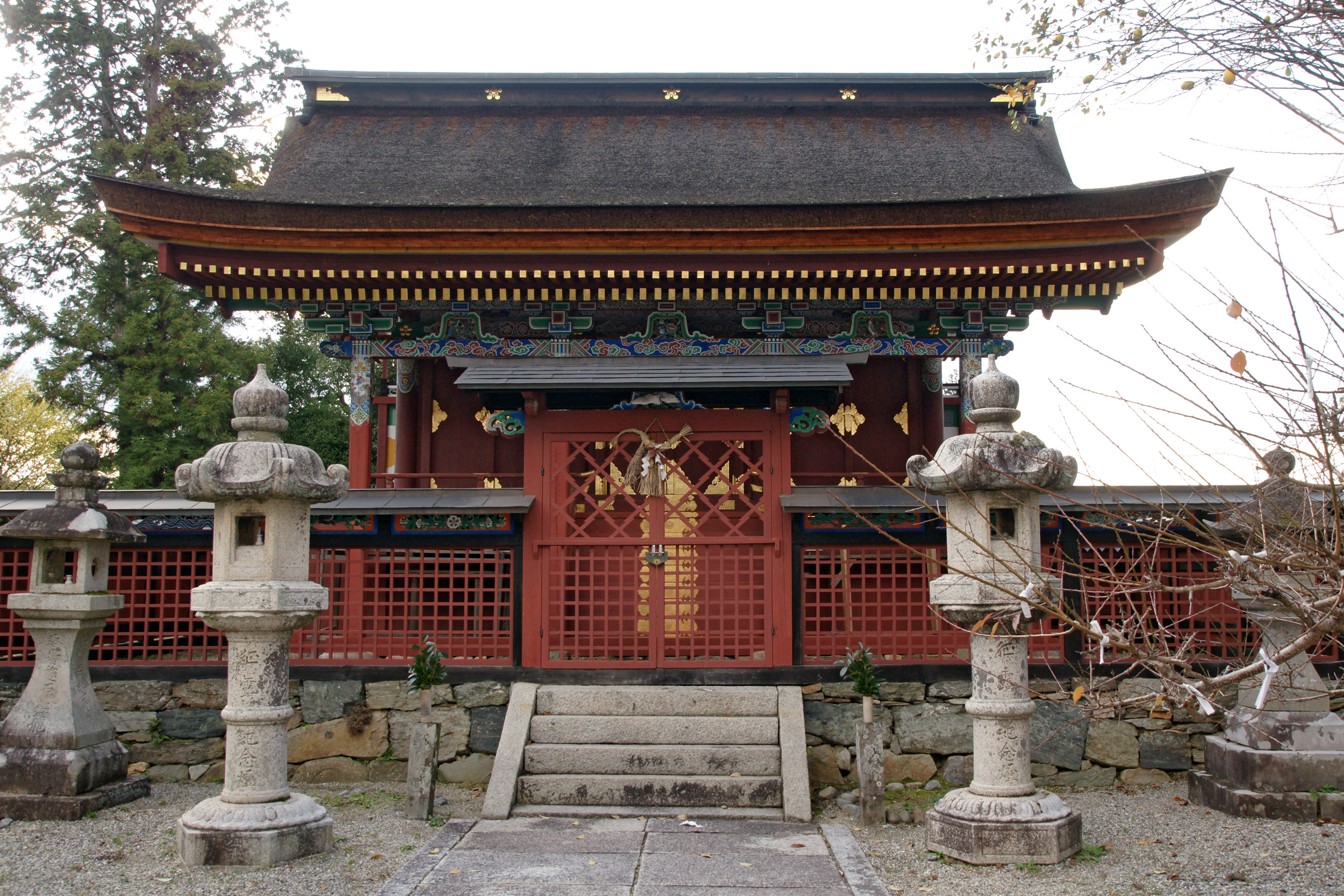
Itoku Tenmangu

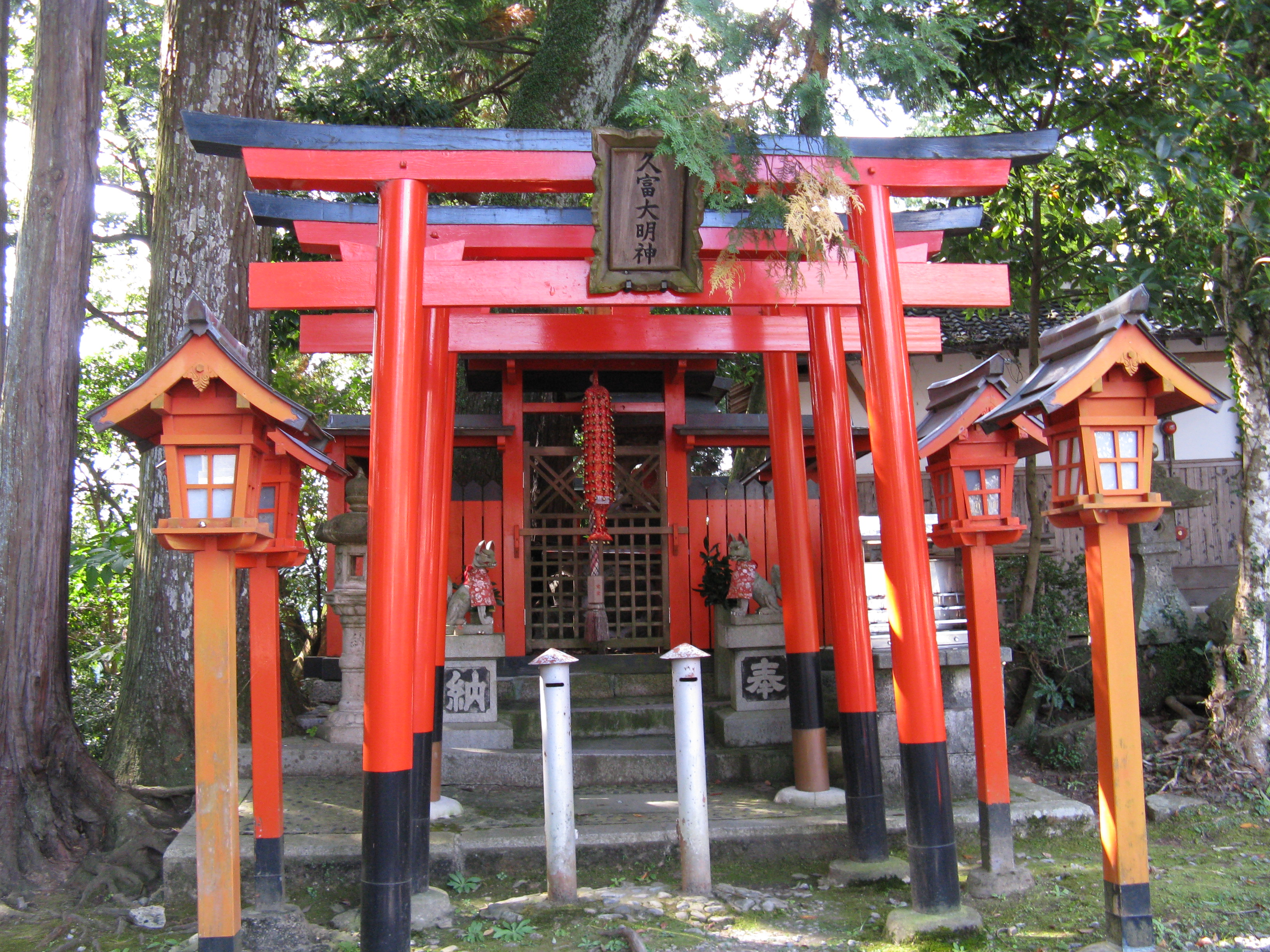
Attached Inari shrine (Deity: Hisatomi Daimyōjin)

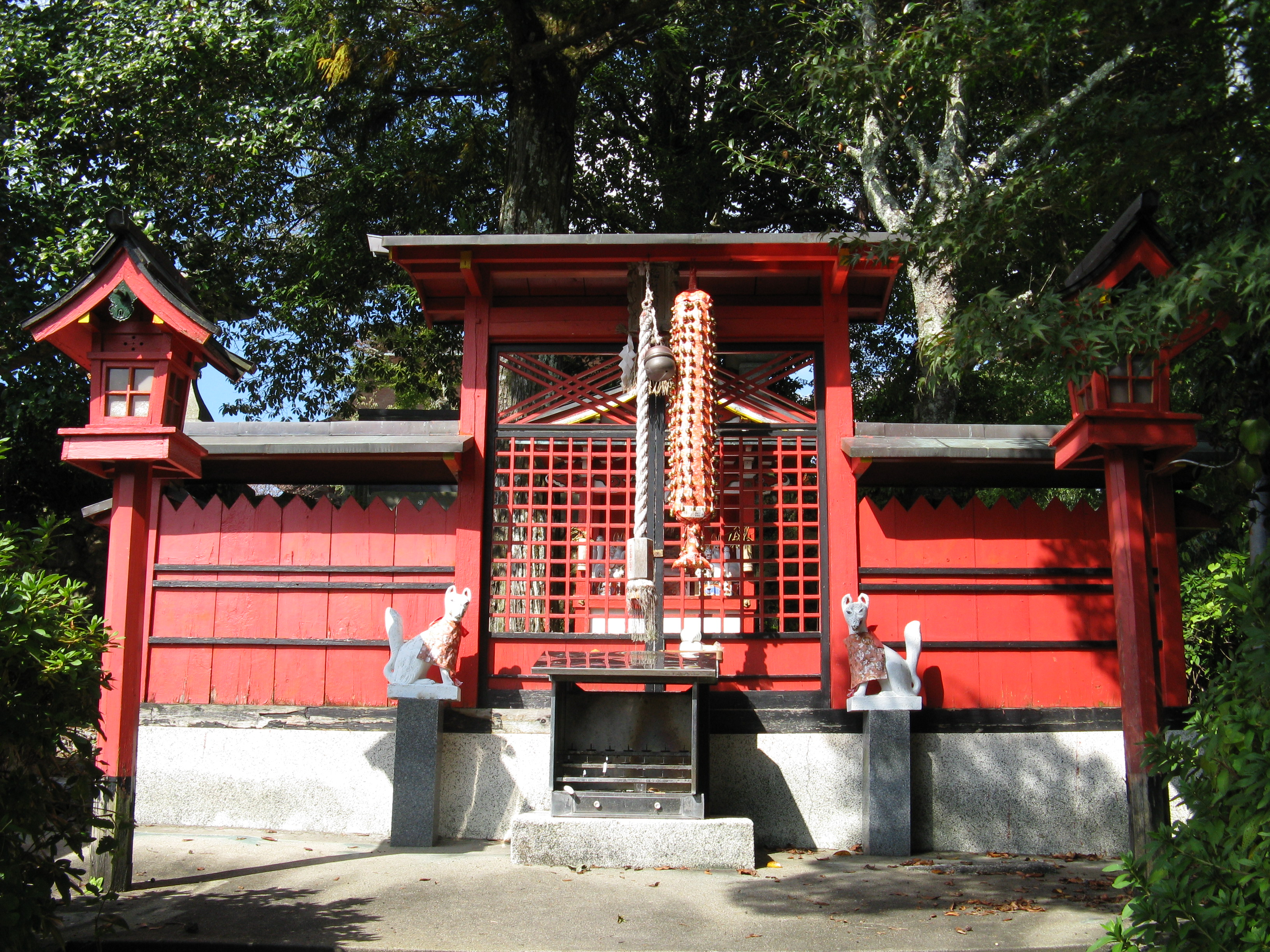
Inari shrine

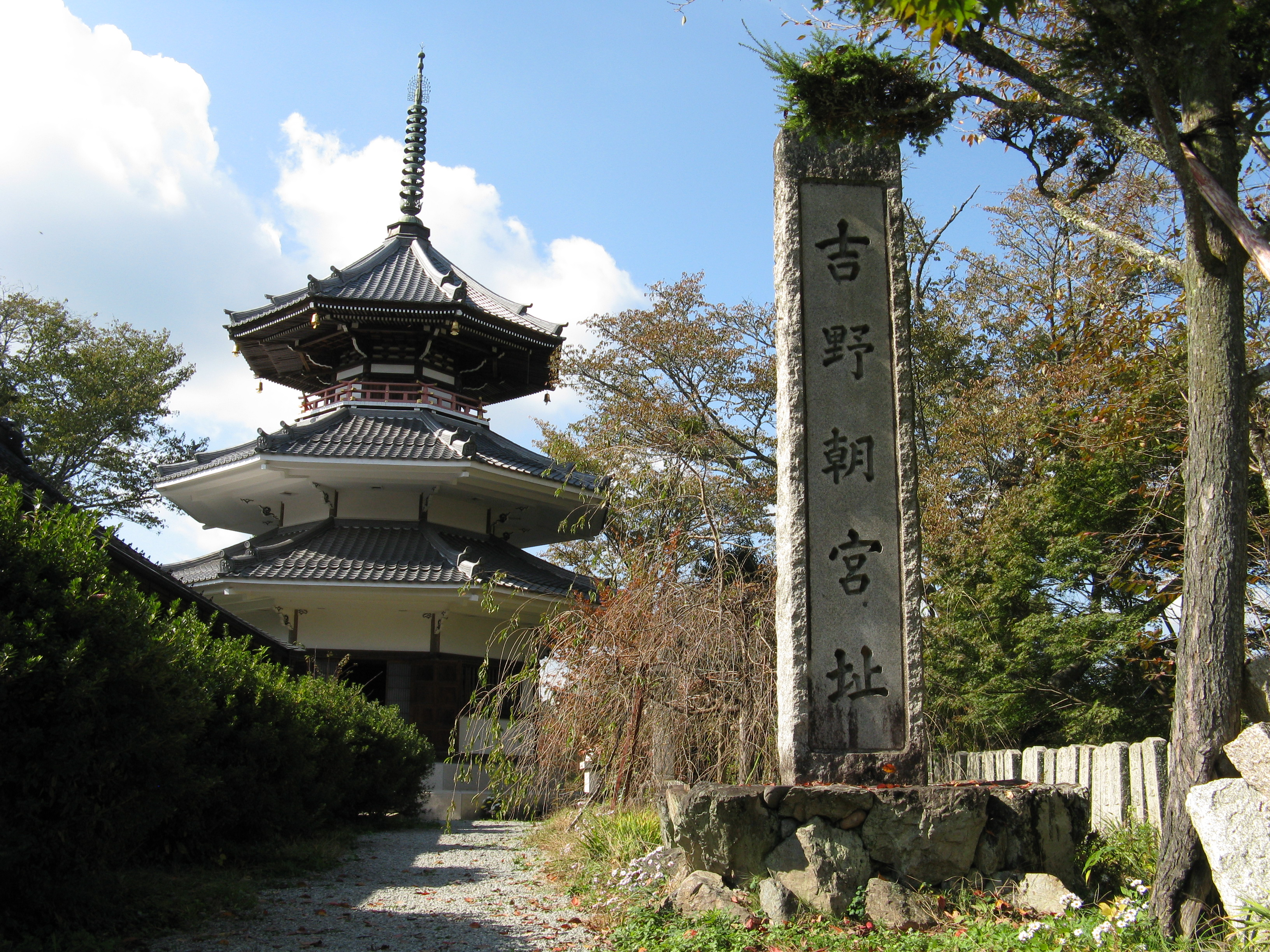
Nanchō myōhō-den

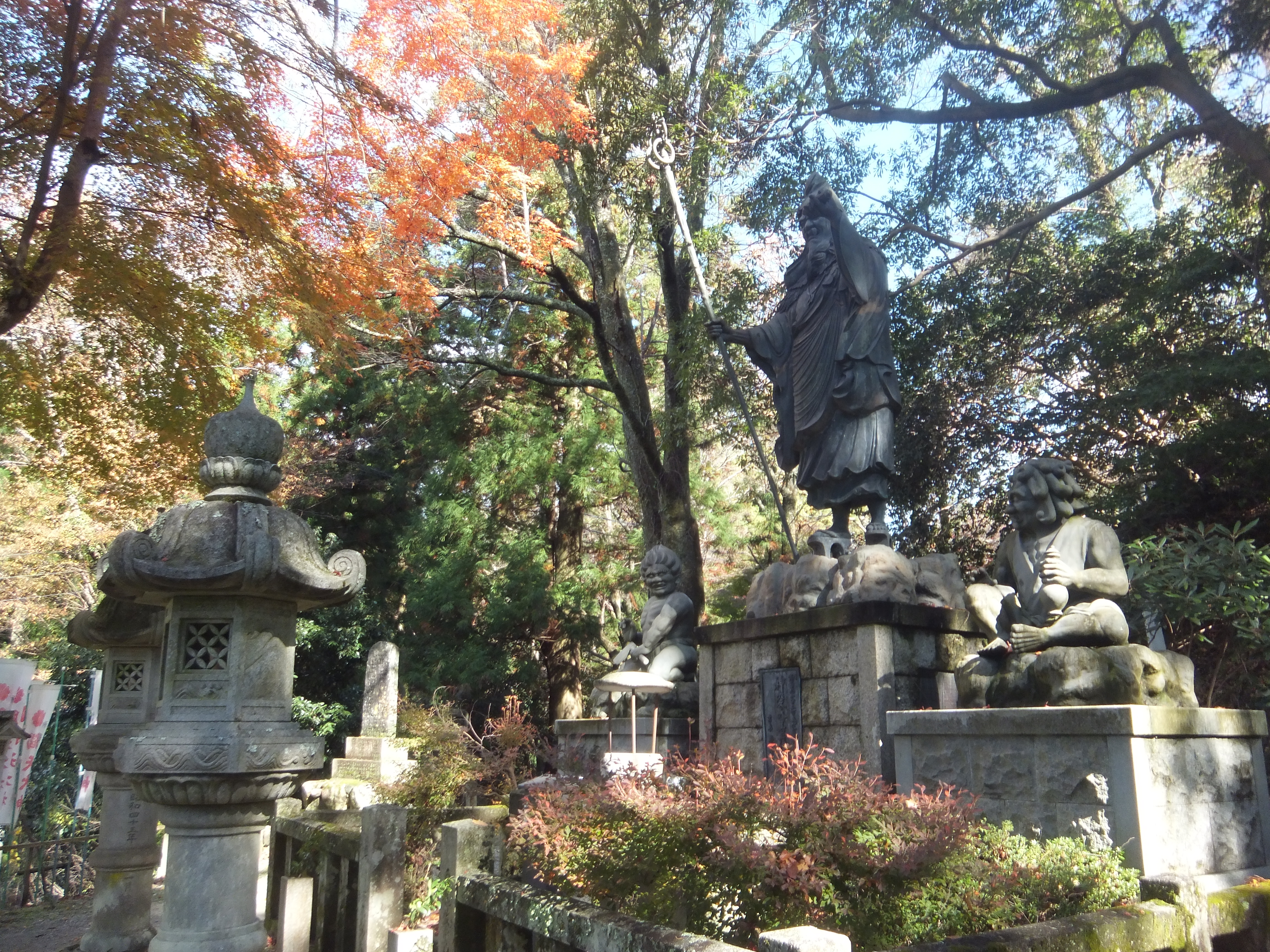
Statue of En no Gyōja near the Nanchō myōhō-den

== See also ==
- Sacred Sites and Pilgrimage Routes in the Kii Mountain Range
- Shugendō
- List of National Treasures of Japan (temples)
- Tourism in Japan
