= Mount Yoshino =

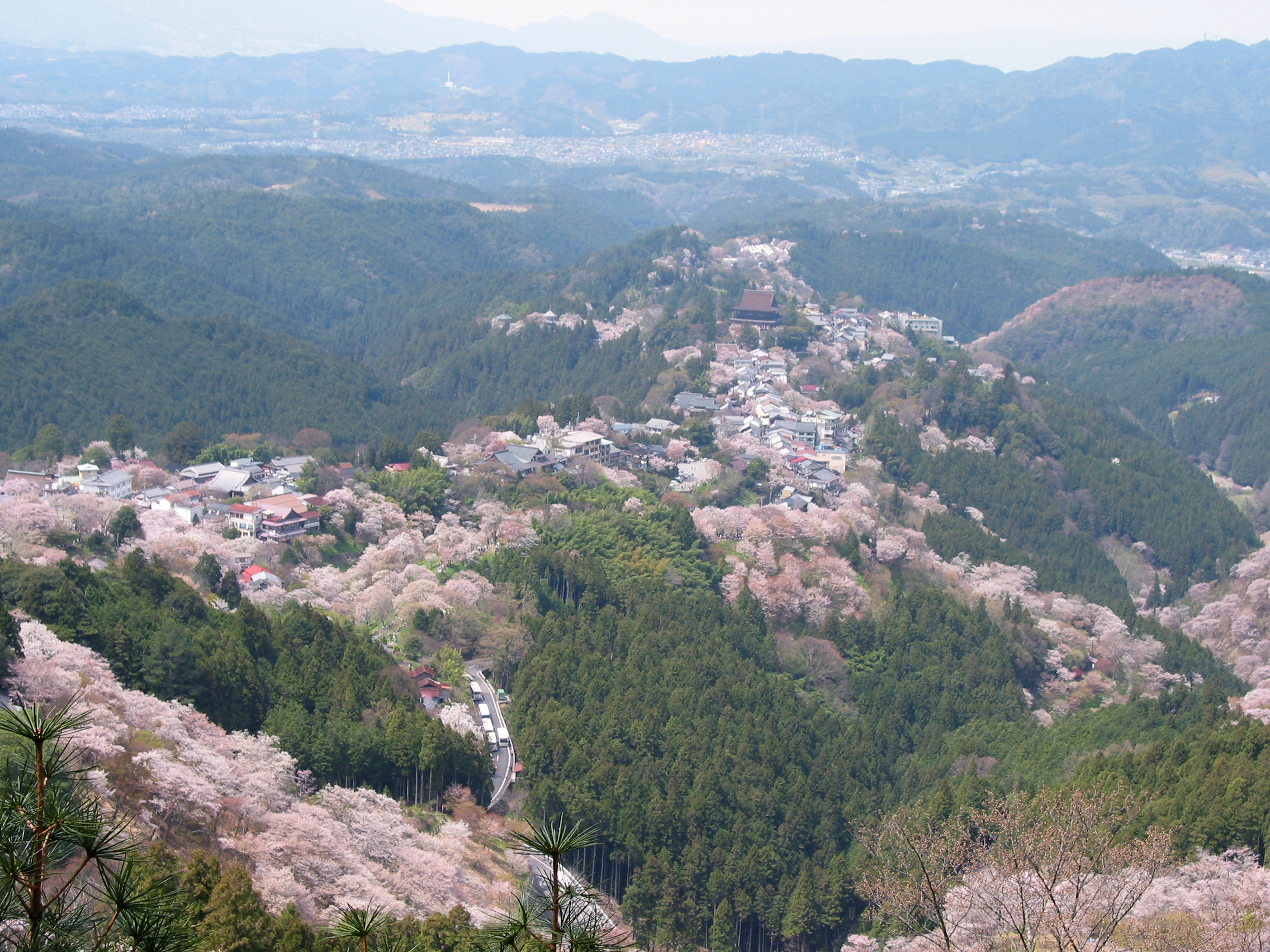
- Cherry blossoms at Mount Yoshino

Highest point
- Listing: Mountains of Japan

Naming
- Native name: 吉野山 (Japanese)

Geography
- Location: Yoshino-cho, Yoshino-gun, Nara, Japan

Geology
- Mountain type: spikey mountain

Climbing
- First ascent: 420 BC
- National Historic Site of Japan National Place of Scenic Beauty
- Location within Japan

UNESCO World Heritage Site
- Official name: Yoshino and Ômine - Yoshinoyama
- Part of: Sacred Sites and Pilgrimage Routes in the Kii Mountain Range
- Criteria: Cultural: (ii), (iii), (iv), (vi)
- Reference: 1142bis-001
- Inscription: 2004 (28th Session)
- Extensions: 2016
- Area: 33.7 ha (83 acres)
- Buffer zone: 916 ha (2,260 acres)
- Coordinates: 34°21′24″N 135°52′14″E

Mount Yoshino (吉野山, Yoshino-yama) is the general name for the mountain ridge that stretches from the south bank of the Yoshino River in the town of Yoshino central Nara Prefecture, Japan, to the Ōmine Mountains, stretching for about eight kilometers from north-to-south, or the broader name of the area dotted with shrines and temples, centered around Kinpusen-ji Temple.

It has long been known as a famous flower spot, especially for its cherry blossoms and is a popular tourist destination. It was designated a National Place of Scenic Beauty and National Historic Site in 1924 and became part of Yoshino-Kumano National Park in 1936. In 2004, Mount Yoshino was designated as part of a UNESCO World Heritage Site under the name Sacred Sites and Pilgrimage Routes in the Kii Mountain Range. In 1990, it was selected as one of Japan's 100 Best Cherry Blossom Spots.

== Mount Yoshino and cherry blossoms ==
Mount Yoshino has been planted with cherry blossoms since the Heian period. Yoshino's cherry trees were planted in four groves at different altitudes, in part so they would come into bloom at different times of the spring. A 1714 account explained that, on their climb to the top, travelers would be able to enjoy the lower 1,000 cherry trees at the base, the middle 1,000 on the way, the upper 1,000 toward the top, and the 1,000 in the precincts of the inner shrine at the top.

It is claimed that Yoshino has more than 30,000 sakura flowering cherry trees, mostly of the Shiroyamazakura, variety These trees have inspired Japanese waka poetry and folk songs for centuries, including a waka in the 10th century poetry compilation Kokin Wakashū. Yoshino is also the subject of several poems in the Ogura Hyakunin Isshu. The 12th century CE Japanese Buddhist poet Saigyō wrote of Mount Yoshino's cherry blossoms. During this period, the extent of the cherry forests was much greater, and large portions have been replaced by more economically valuable Hinoki cypress or Cryptomeria forests before and during World War II. In the 21st century, efforts have been made to restore the cherry forests to their former extent.

The reason why such a large number of cherry tree exist on Mount Yoshino is subject to controversy, but a prevalent belief is that the cherry tree is the sacred tree of Zao Gongen, the central deity of Shugendo, a mountain cult centered in this area. It was the practice of ascetics to carve images of Zao Gongen from cherry wood, and for worshippers to donate saplings of cherry trees as votive offerings. An alternative theory is that Asuka period (Prince Oama) (later Emperor Temmu) had a dream of cherry trees in full bloom in mid-winter while he was staying at the Yoshino Palace, which inspired him to seize the throne in the Jinshin War.

== Mount Yoshino as a sacred mountain ==
Several important religious and pilgrimage destinations are located around Mount Yoshino, including Yoshino Mikumari Shrine, Kimpu Shrine and Kimpusen-ji.

The Ōmine Okugakemichi trail was established by the 7th century ascetic En no Gyōja. It connects Kimpusen-ji in Yoshino district, Nara Prefecture with the Kumano Sanzan in southern Wakayama Prefecture. The route is very rugged and isolated, with a number of demanding sections up to narrow paths on steep slopes and steep climbs on cliffs. n 2002, the trail was designated as a National Historic Site, and it was included within the Sacred Sites and Pilgrimage Routes in the Kii Mountain Range UNESCO World Heritage Site since 2004.

== Hiking ==
Yoshinoyama has numerous hiking trails meandering through the town and the cherry blossom forests. A whole day can be spent hiking these trails and visiting all the different viewpoints. Multi-day hiking trails also connect to Koyasan and the town of Hongu in Wakayama prefecture.

Famous products in the area of Mount Yoshino include edible goods made from kudzu root and persimmon leaf-wrapped sushi (kakinoha-zushi).

== Gallery ==
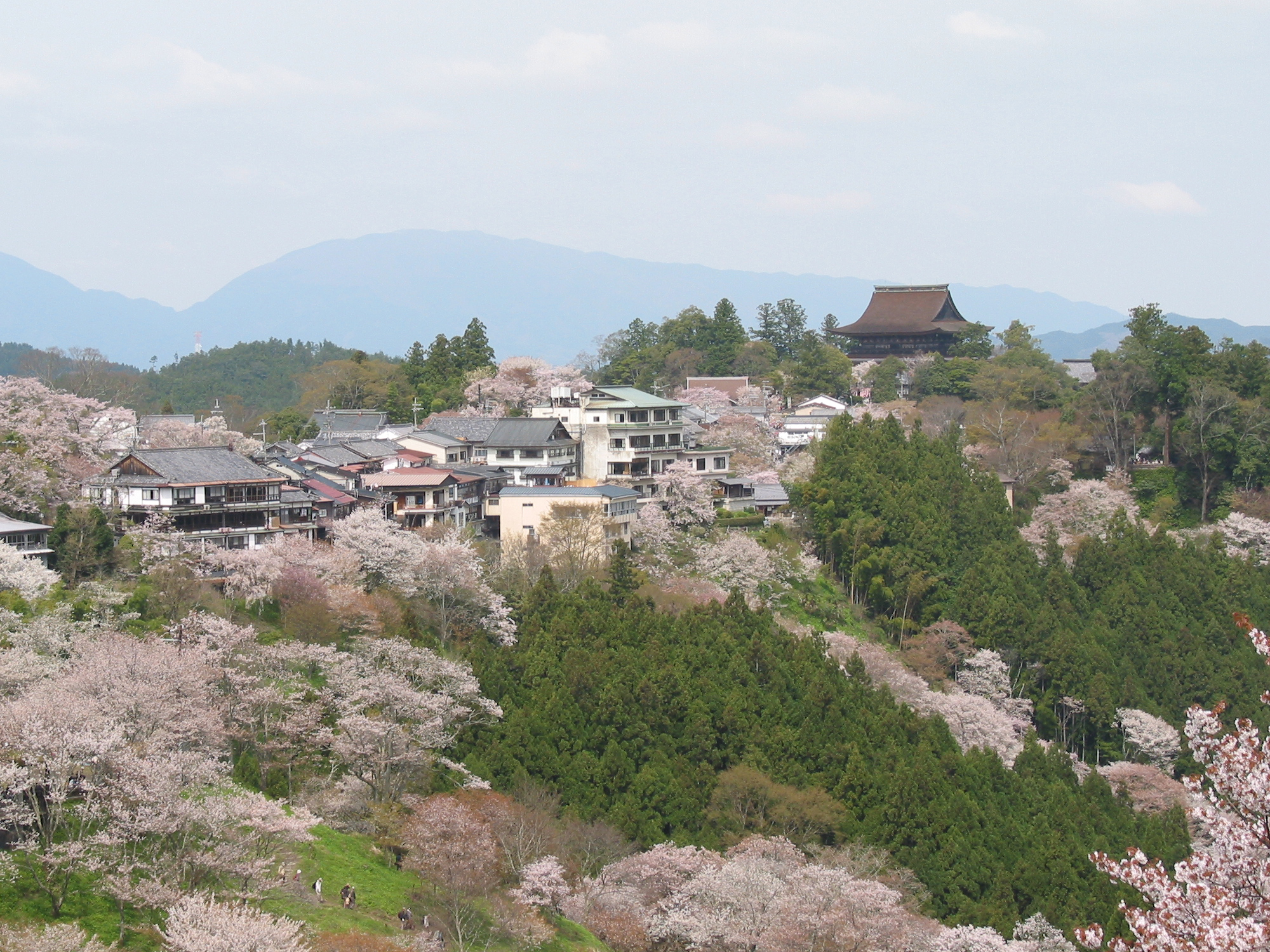
Cherry blossoms at Mount Yoshino

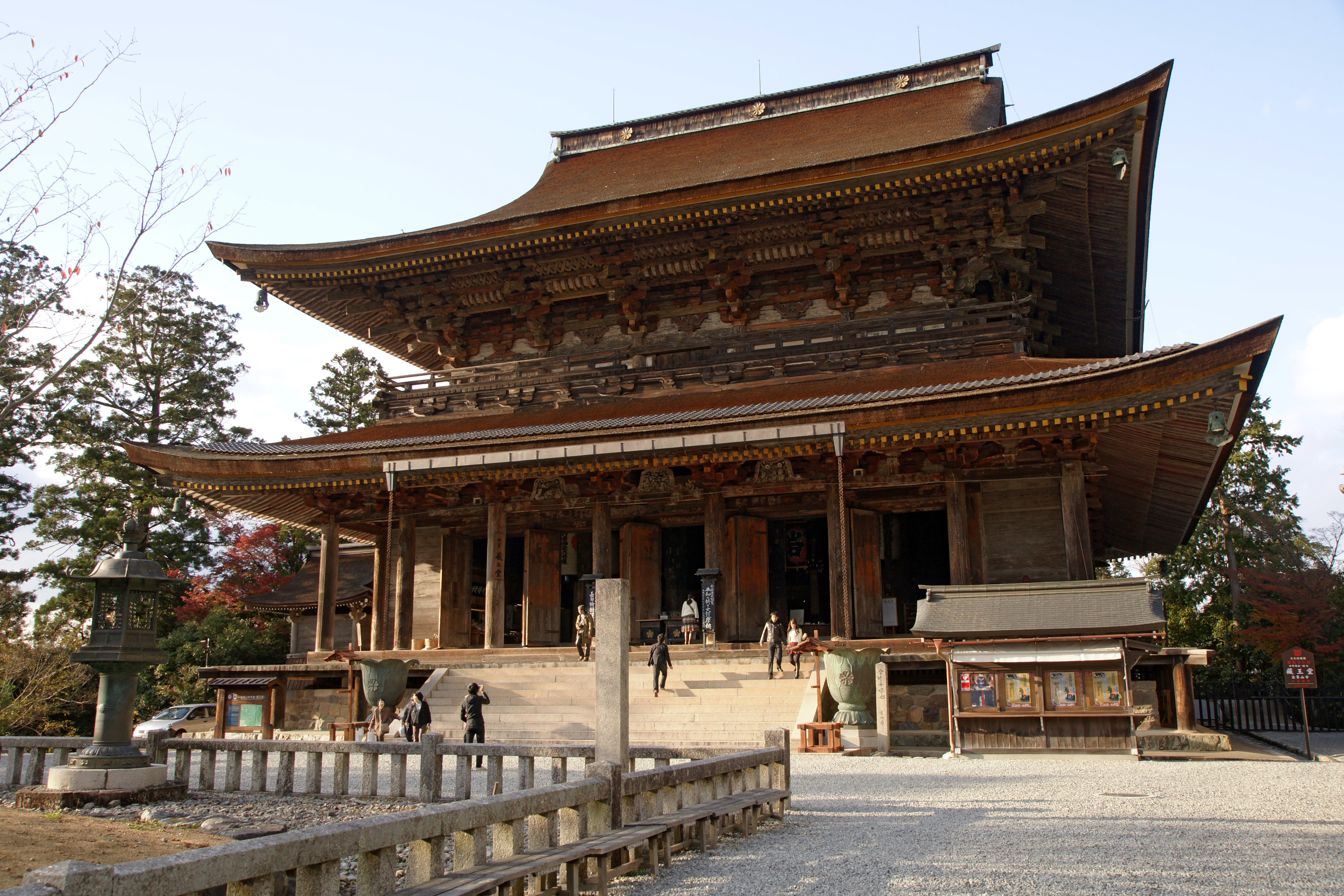
"Zaō-Hall" (Zaōdō) of Kimpusen-ji, a World Heritage Site

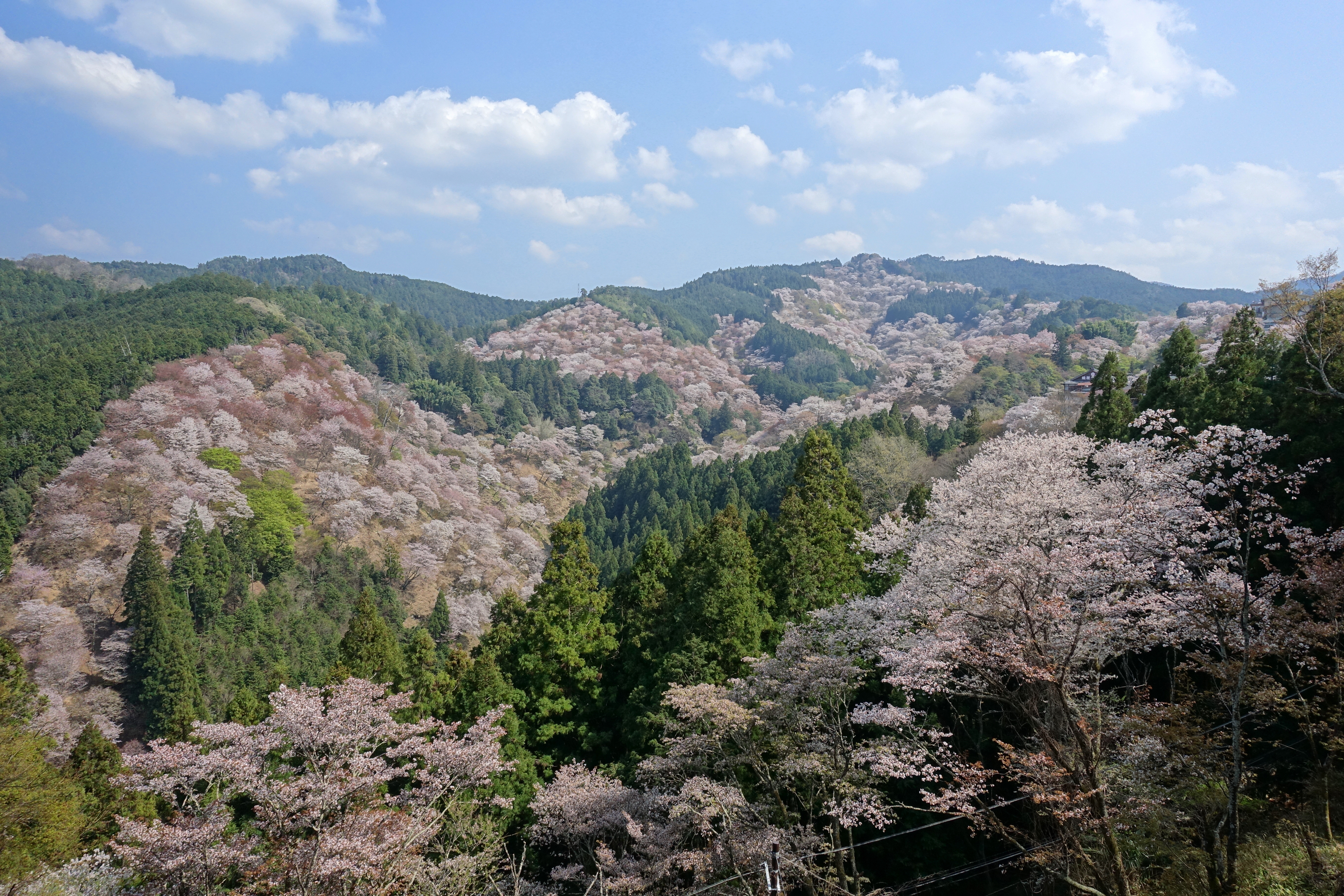
Cherry blossoms on the surrounding hills

== See also ==
- Tourism in Japan
- List of Historic Sites of Japan (Nara)
- List of Places of Scenic Beauty of Japan (Nara)

== Notes ==
Sources

- Mostow, Joshua S., ed. (1996). Pictures of the Heart: The Hyakunin Isshu in Word and Image. Honolulu: University of Hawaii Press. ISBN 978-0-8248-1705-3.
