= Yoshino, Nara =

Yoshino 吉野町
- Town
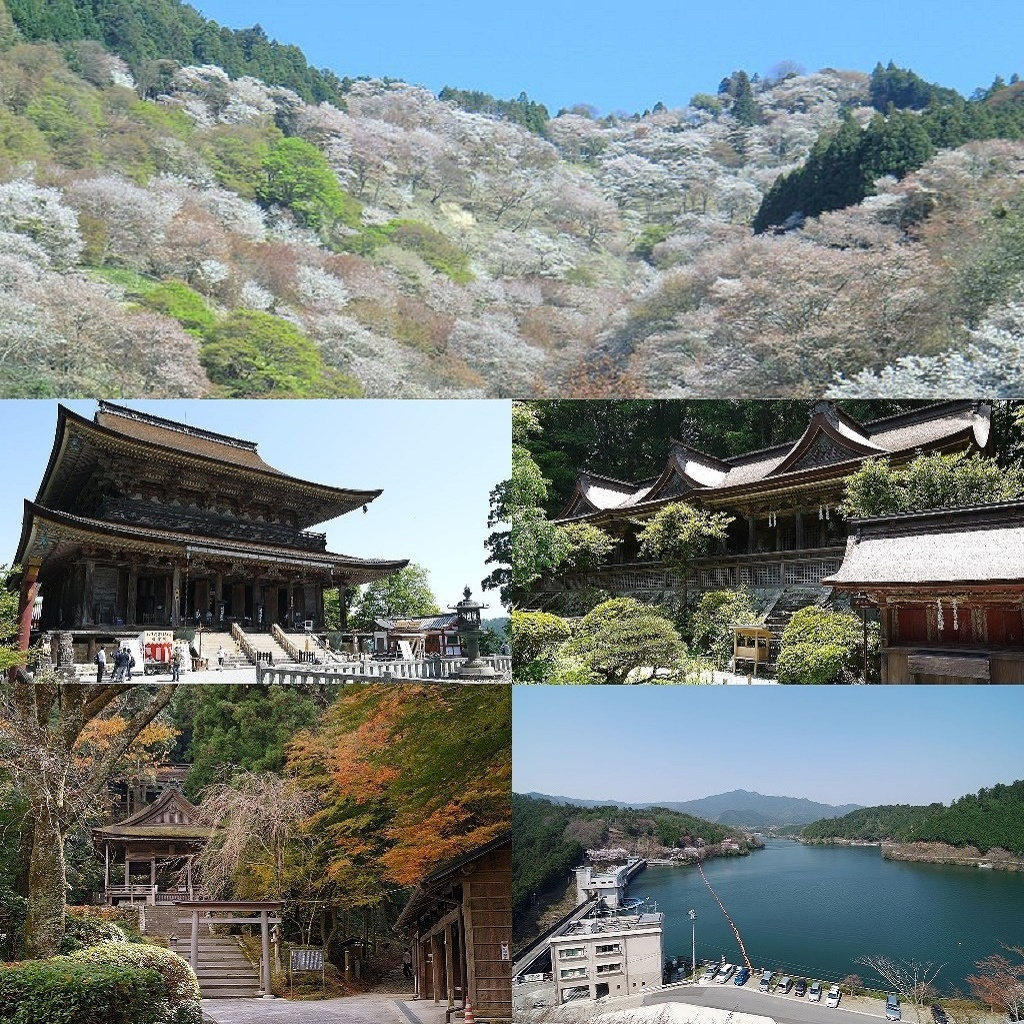

- Flag Seal
- Location of Yoshino in Nara Prefecture

- Location in Japan Yoshino (Nara Prefecture)
- Coordinates: 34°23′46″N 135°51′27″E
- Country: Japan
- Region: Kansai
- Prefecture: Nara
- District: Yoshino

Area
  - Total: 95.65 km^{2} (36.93 sq mi)

Population (September 20, 2024)
  - Total: 5,874
  - Density: 61.41/km^{2} (159.1/sq mi)
- Time zone: UTC+09:00 (JST)
- City hall address: 80-1 Ōaza Kamiichi, Yoshino-machi, Yoshino-gun, Nara-ken 639-3192
- Website: Official website

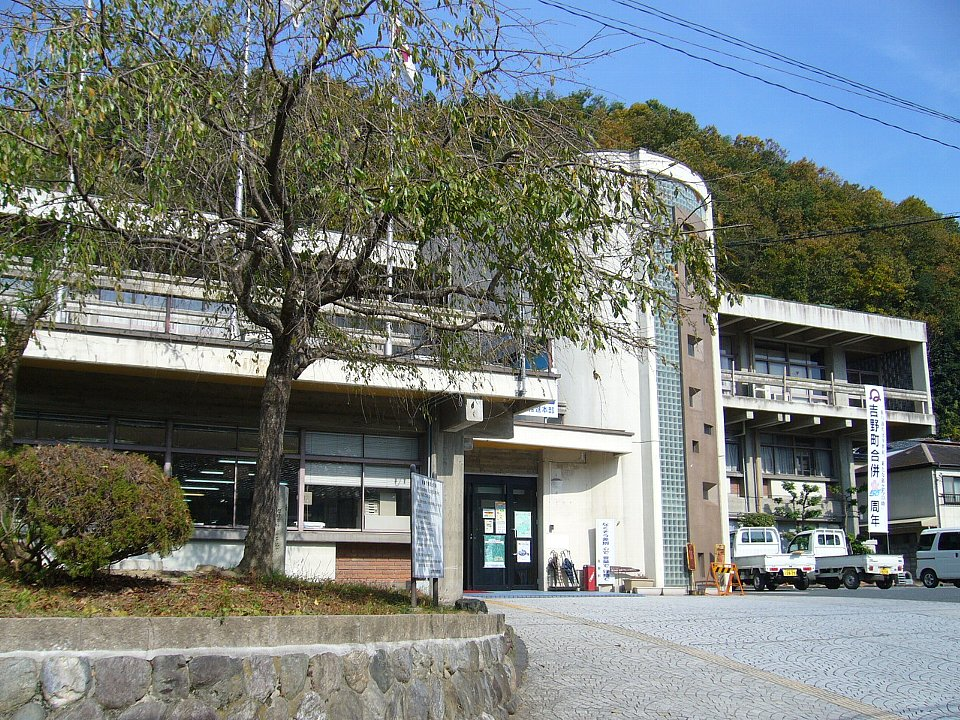
Yoshino Town Hall

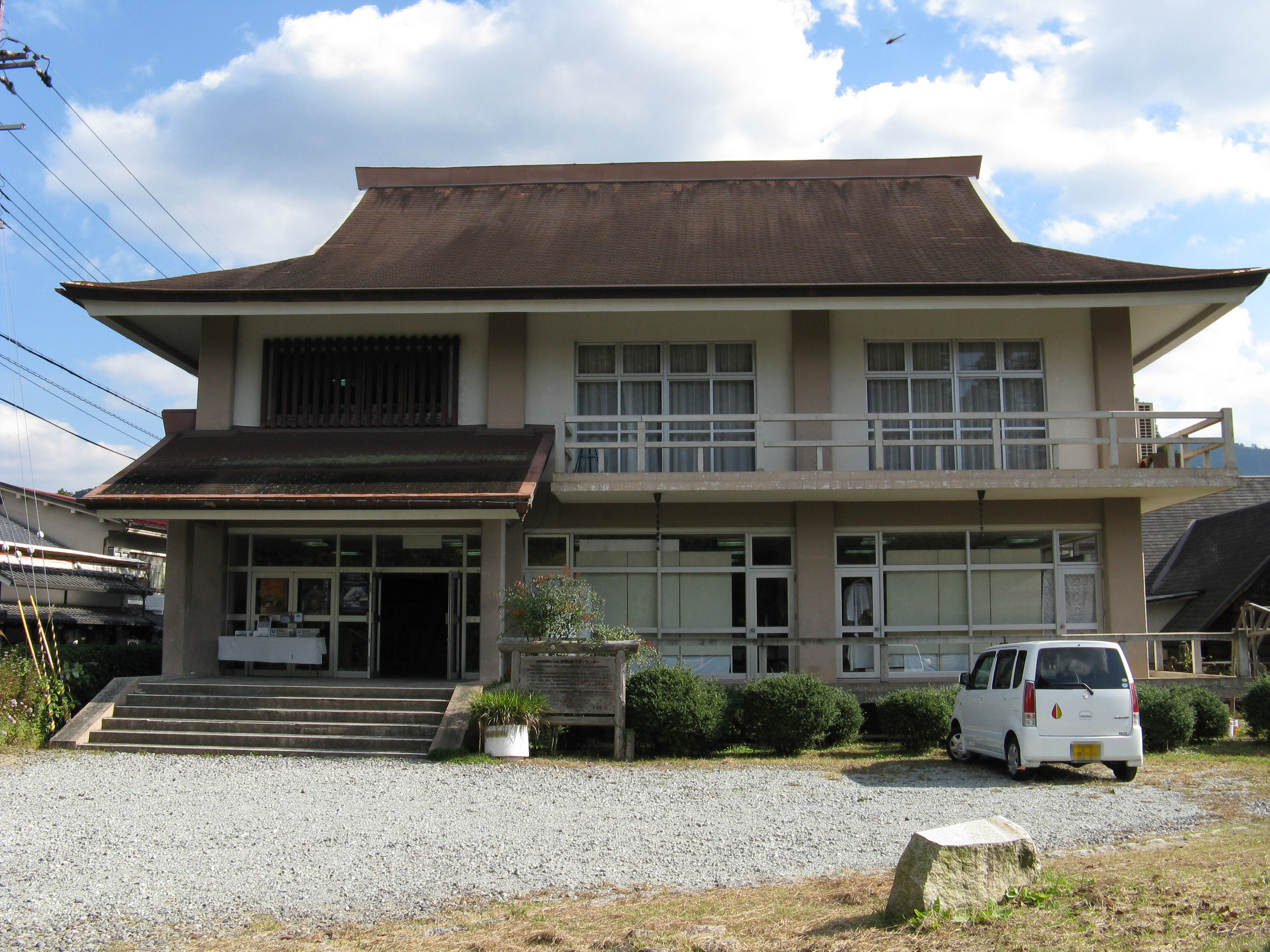
Yoshinoyama Visitors Center

Yoshino (吉野町, Yoshino-chō) is a town located in Yoshino District, Nara Prefecture, Japan. As of 30 September 2024, the town had an estimated population of 5,874 in 2,997 households, and a population density of 61 persons per km^{2}. The total area of the town is 95.65 km^{2} (36.93 sq mi). In 2012, Yoshino was designated one of The Most Beautiful Villages in Japan.

== Geography ==
Yoshino is located in the central part of Nara Prefecture. The Ryumon Mountains run east-to-west in the north, and the Omine Mountain Range (Mount Aonega is the highest point within the town area) spreads out to the south. The mountains that extend from the Daidaka Mountains also are to the east. Between these, the Yoshino River flows from southeast-to-west through the center of the town, and the Takami River flows from east-to-west.

The Yoshino River meanders left and right from the upstream (Kawakami Village) to the area where the Tsuburo River flows into it, weaving its way through the mountains. Along the way, the Takami River joins it near Shinko and Kubogainai. After crossing Imoyama and Seyama, near Yoshino High School, it makes a large left turn and continues downstream (Oyodo Town) in a relatively straight line. Inside the meandering Yoshino River, there is a long and narrow stretch of relatively flat land, forming settlements. There is also relatively open land near the middle reaches of the tributaries of the Yoshino River, where settlements have formed. The Kamiichi district, where the town hall is located, is densely packed with houses in the small space between the river and the mountains.

- Mountains: Yoshino Mountain
- Rivers: Yoshino River
- Lakes: Lake Tsuburo

== Surrounding municipalities ==
Nara Prefecture

- Asuka
- Higashiyoshino
- Kawakami
- Kurotaki
- Ōyodo
- Sakurai
- Shimoichi
- Uda

=== Climate ===
Yoshino has a humid subtropical climate (Köppen Cfa) characterized by warm summers and cool winters with light to no snowfall. The average annual temperature in Yoshino is 13.0 °C. The average annual rainfall is 1893 mm with September as the wettest month. The temperatures are highest on average in August, at around 24.7 °C, and lowest in January, at around 1.4 °C.

=== Demographics ===
Per Japanese census data, the population of Yoshino is as shown below

Historical population
Year	Pop.	±%
1940	16,289	—
1950	20,186	+23.9%
1960	18,782	−7.0%
1970	16,419	−12.6%
1980	15,182	−7.5%
1990	13,421	−11.6%
2000	11,318	−15.7%
2010	8,642	−23.6%
2020	6,229	−27.9%

== History ==
The area of Yoshino was part of ancient Yamato Province. The Kojiki and Nihon Shoki mention this place as a stopover on the eastward journey of Emperor Jimmu to conquer Yamato. During the Asuka period, due to its location directly south of the ancient imperial capitals of Asuka-kyō, Fujiwara-kyō, and Heijō-kyō, this area was a popular recreational spot for Emperor Ojin and other emperors and aristocrats, and Yoshino Palace, was located in this area. During the Nara period, the area was sacred for adherents of Shugendo. It was the capital of the Southern Court in the Nanboku-chō period. After the Meiji restoration, the villages of Yoshino was established with the creation of the modern municipalities system on April 1, 1889. Yoshino was raised to town status on April 24, 1928. On May 3, 1956, Yoshino annexed the town of Kamiichi, and villages of Kokusui, Nakasho, Ryumon, and Nakaryumon.

== Government ==
Yoshino has a mayor-council form of government with a directly elected mayor and a unicameral town council of ten members. Yoshino, collectively with the other municipalities of Yoshino District, contributes two members to the Nara Prefectural Assembly. In terms of national politics, the town is part of the Nara 3rd district of the lower house of the Diet of Japan.

== Economy ==
The economy of Yoshino is based on forestry, sake brewing and the tourist industry.

=== Lumber ===
The town of Yoshino produces a wide variety of wood-based goods made from lumber harvested from the local forest land. Most of the forest within the Yoshino area is artificial, consisting of red cedar and cypress trees that have been planted and harvested in cycles for 500 years. The Yoshino River served in past times as a means of transportation for the lumber harvested in the region.

=== Paper ===
The Kuzu district of Yoshino has a long history of traditional Japanese washi paper production. According to a local story, Prince Oama (later to become Emperor Tenmu), taught the residents of Kuzu the process of making washi in the 7th century.

== Education ==
Yoshino has one public elementary school and one public junior high school operated by the town government and one public high school operated by the Nara Prefectural Board of Education.

== Transportation ==
=== Railways ===
Kintetsu Railway - Yoshino Line

Yamato-Kamiichi - Yoshino-Jingū - Yoshino

=== Highways ===
- National Route 169
- National Route 370

=== Other ===
- Yoshino Ropeway

== Local attractions ==
The most well-known area within the town is Yoshino Mountain, famous for its many thousands of sakura trees; much poetry has been written on the subject by several famous authors, including Chiyo and Uejima Onitsura. These flowering cherry trees were planted in four groves at different altitudes, in part so that the trees would be visible coming into bloom at different times in the spring. An account of Yoshino written in about 1714 explained that, on their climb to the top, travelers would be able to enjoy the lower 1,000 cherry trees at the base, the middle 1,000 on the way, the upper 1,000 toward the top, and the 1,000 in the precincts of the inner shrine at the top.

== Notable places ==
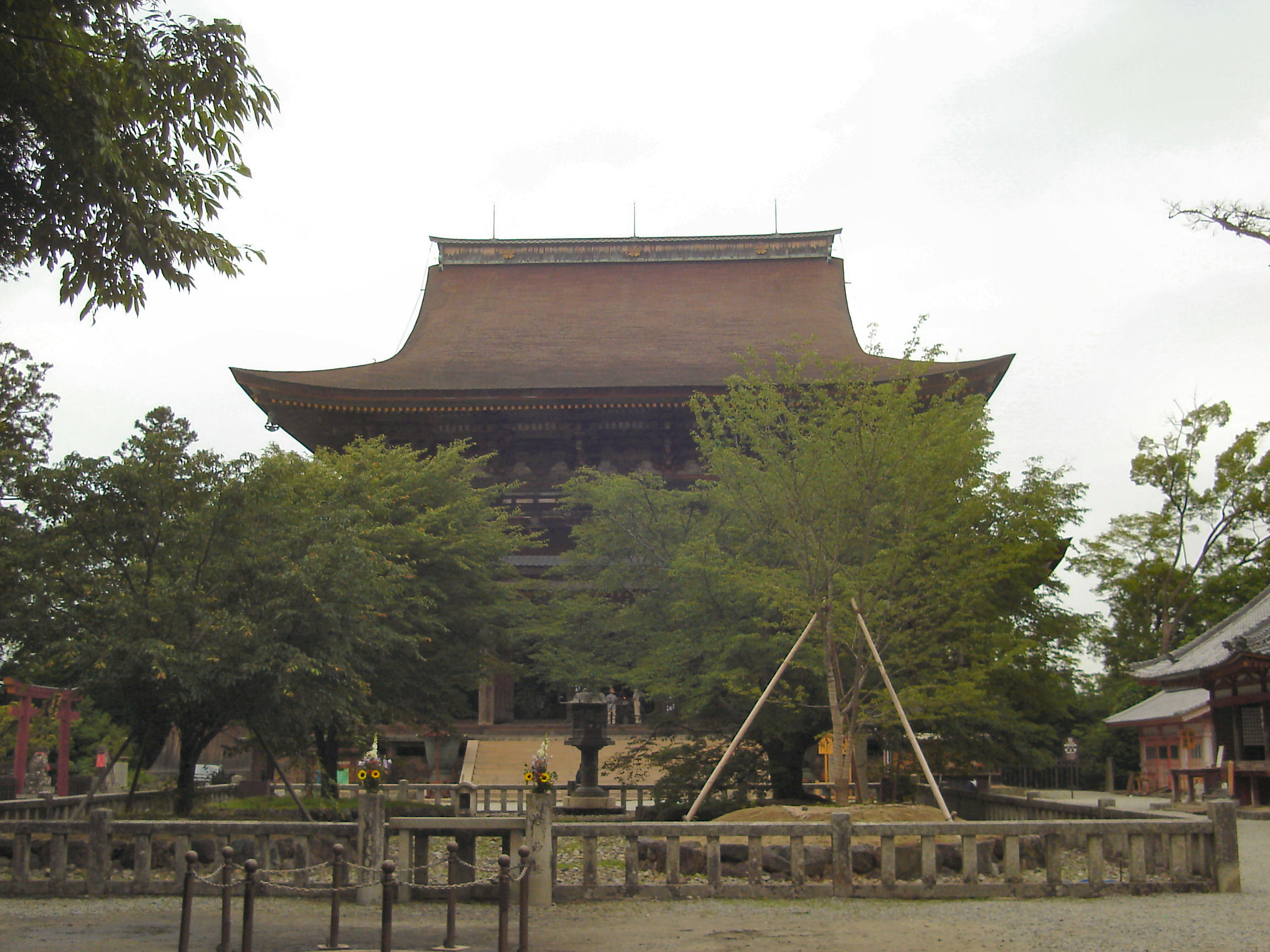
Kinpusen-ji

- Kinpusen-ji
- Kinpu Shrine
- Miyataki (district)
- Nyoirin-ji
- Ryumon-no-taki (waterfall)
- Sakuramotobō
- Saigyō-an Hermitage
- Sakuragi Shrine
- Takataki (waterfall)
- Yoshimizu Shrine
- Yoshino-Kumano National Park
- Yoshinomikumari Shrine
- Mount Yoshino
- Yoshino Shrine
