= Okuyoshino dialect =

Kansai dialect of Japanese

- 奥吉野方言
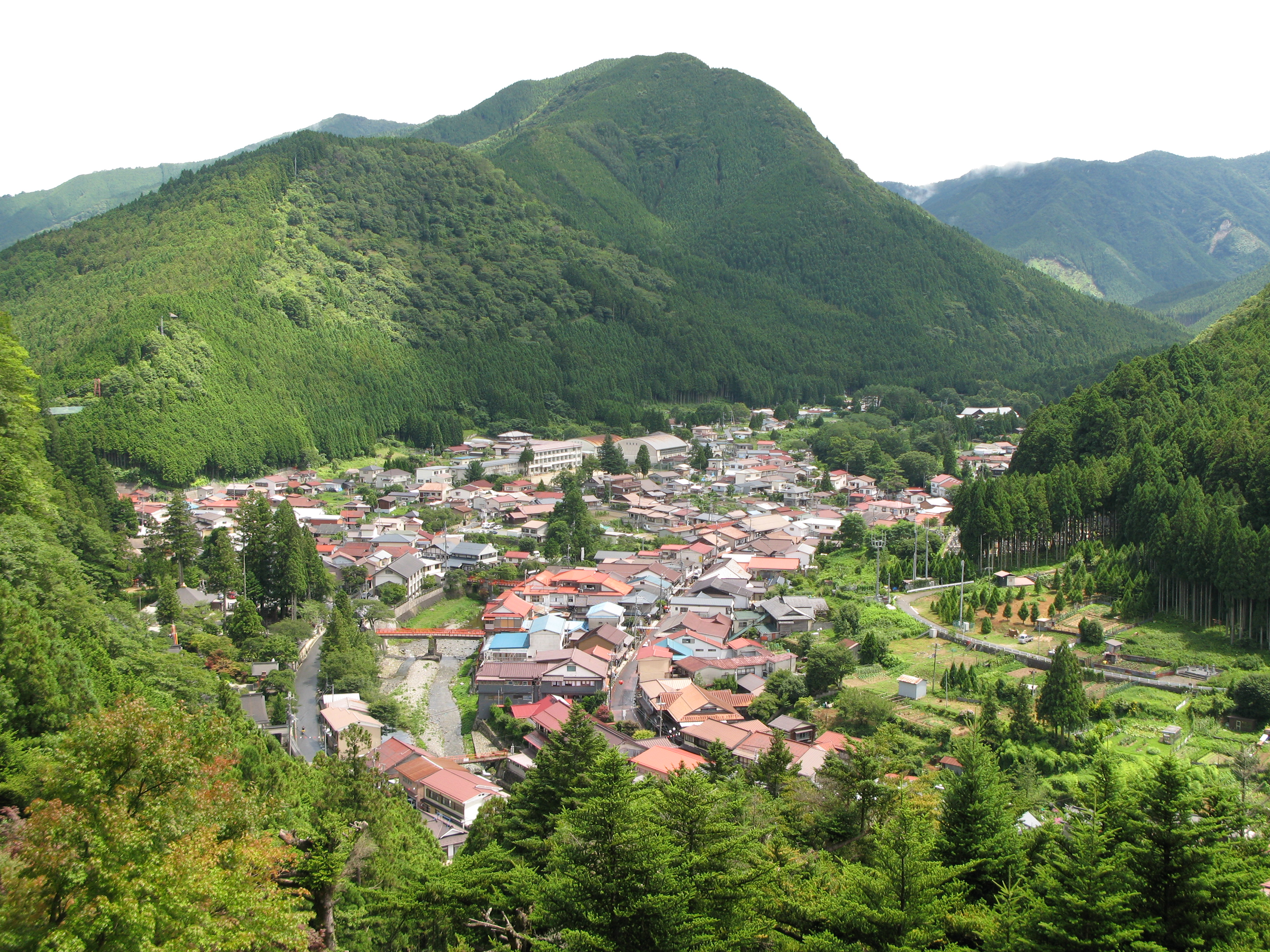
- Dorogawa, near Tenkawa in southern Nara Prefecture
- Native to: Japan
- Region: Southern Nara Prefecture, Kansai
- Language family: Japonic: Japanese; Western; Kansai; Okuyoshino dialect
- Dialects: Totsukawa; Kitayama; Oto-Tenkawa

Language codes
- ISO 639-3: –
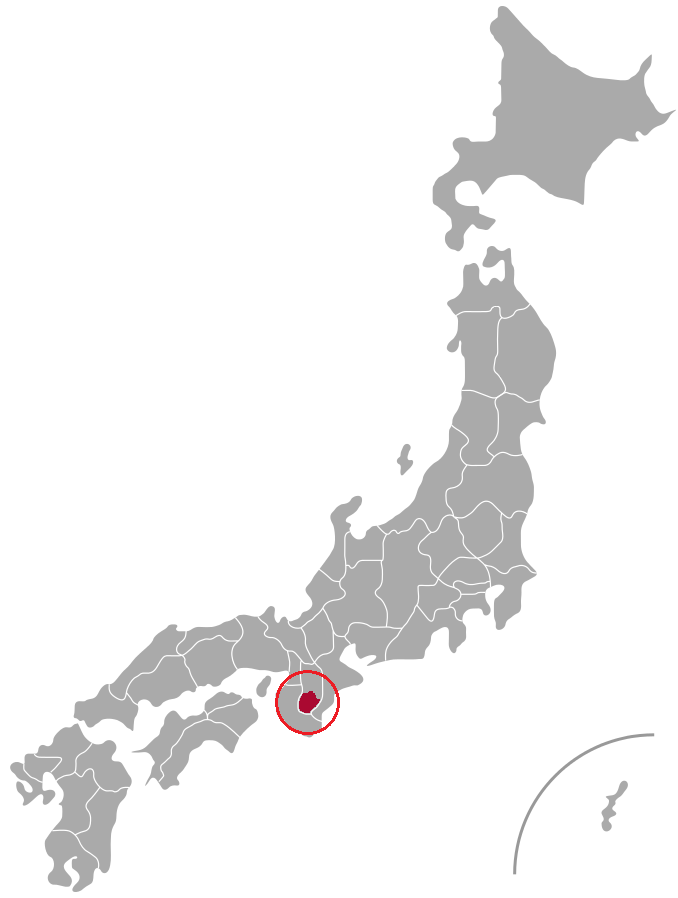
- Okuyoshino dialect area (burgundy)

The Okuyoshino dialect (Japanese: 奥吉野方言 okuyoshino hogen) is a Kansai dialect of Japanese spoken in several villages in the Okuyoshino region of southern Nara Prefecture. It is well-known as a language island, with various rare and unique characteristics.

The dialect is spoken in the villages of Totsukawa, Kamikitayama, Shimokitayama, Tenkawa and Oto. Nosegawa is also sometimes included, although it is classified officially under the Nara dialect area.

== Overview ==
Despite the relatively small size of Nara Prefecture, there is a major difference between the dialects of the north-central and southern parts of the prefecture. The mountain ridges of Tentsuji, Kominami and Obamine form a natural boundary, north of which the Nara dialect is spoken and south of which the Okuyoshino dialect is spoken. The many atypical traits of the Okuyoshino dialect, such as its having a Tokyo-style pitch accent despite being in the Kansai region, have been fostered due to its history as a region isolated from its surroundings by the Kii Mountains. However, in addition to the effect of mass communication, the movement of residents due to dam construction as well as improved transport access and depopulation are causing rapid changes in the dialect.

North-south dialect differences in Nara Prefecture
	North Nara (Nara dialect)	South Nara (Okuyoshino dialect)
Pitch accent	Keihan-style	Tokyo-style
Diphthong merging	Rare	Present
Lengthening of monomoraic words	Present	Absent
Copula	Ya (や)	Ja (じゃ) and da (だ)
Past conjectural form	Past tense + yaro (や	-te form stem + tsuro
Distinction between the progressive and perfective aspects	Absent	Present
Expression of attitudinals	Various	Only via particles

Even between the various villages in Okuyoshino there are dialectal differences. The village of Nosegawa is sometimes included in the dialect area due to various Okuyoshino-like traits such as a lack of modal verbs to use in attitudinal expressions. The sub-divisions of the dialect are shown below.

Okuyoshino dialect

- Totsukawa sub-dialect – Totsukawa village, Yoshino district
- Kitayama sub-dialect
  - Kamikitayama – Kamikitayama village, Yoshino district
  - Shimokitayama – Shimokitayama village, Yoshino district
- Oto-Tenkawa sub-dialect
  - Oto-Tenkawa – Tenkawa village, Yoshino district and Oto village (now part of Gojo city)
  - Dorogawa – Dorogawa near Tenkawa village, Yoshino district

== Phonology ==
The Okuyoshino dialect possesses a nairin (Tokyo-style pitch accent); the same type as those used in the Nagoya, Tango and Okayama dialects, among others, although somewhat different from that of Tokyo. There are some differences depending on the area, however. For example, the usually flat kaze ga (かぜが) can be either kaze ga (かぜが), kaze ga (かぜが) or kaze ga (かぜが), and in Kamikitayama and Shimokitayama the pitch may re-occur within the same word after initially dropping off, e.g., kaze ga (かぜが). Within the part of the dialect area that neighbours Keihan-style speaking areas, a stretch of land from Tenkawa (excluding Dorogawa) to Sakamoto in Ono possesses a pitch accent intermediary to the Tokyo and Keihan-styles, with fluctuations in pitch accent between the villages of Tsubouchi, Wada, Shiono and Sakamoto, Ono.

Aside from the common merging of ei (えい) to a long i (いぃ), variations in diphthongs are rare in Kansai dialects. In the Okuyoshino dialect, however, the diphthongs ai (あい) and ui (うい) are also merged into long a (あぁ)’s and long i (いぃ)’s, respectively. For example, hayai (早い early) becomes hayaa (早あ) and akarui (明るい bright) becomes akarii (明りい). The characteristic lengthening of monomoraic nouns found in Kansai dialects (e.g., me (目 eye) → mee (目ぇ) is absent in the Okuyoshino dialect, in addition to the shortening of words like ikoka (行こか let’s go) (shortened from ikouka (行こうか)).

Across all of Nara Prefecture, there is an extremely high incidence of z-starting mora being replaced with d-starting mora (e.g., zabuton (ざぶとん cushion) is said dabuton (だぶとん)), with this being particularly extensive in Dorogawa, Tenkawa. Additionally, there is very occasional mixing of z- and d-starting mora with r-starting mora, e.g., kedo (けど but) is said kero (けろ).

In addition to the distinction between the yotsugana ji (じ), di (ぢ), zu (ず) and dzu (づ), the palatalised sounds kwa (クヮ) and gwa (グヮ) across Nara Prefecture and nasalisation of d-starting mora within or at the end of words in some parts of Okuyoshino can be found. However, kwa and gwa are rapidly disappearing.

In Dorogawa, another uncommon trait is the changing of t-starting mora to s-starting mora. For example, kashite (貸して lend me ~) is said kaise (かいせ) and keshitoke (消しとけ rub that off) is said keisoke (けいそけ).

== Grammar ==
=== Verbs ===
In addition to the insertion of a u (う) in u-ending verbs like in kouta (こうた) (from katta (買った bought), there are uncommon euphonic changes found in various parts of Okuyoshino. In Totsukawa and Shimokitayama, a (あ) is inserted into the te-forms of certain verbs like kaku (書く to write), to produce kaate (書あて write and…) instead of kaite (書いて). In Dorogawa, gu-ending verbs have an n (ん) inserted into their past tense form, e.g., sosoida (注いだ poured) becomes sosonda (注んだ). In Tsubouchi, Tenkawa, a form thought to be intermediary between this and the standard Japanese conjugation can be found: sosoinda (注いんだ). In Totsukawa, Ono and Shimokitayama, bu- and mu-ending verbs have a u inserted into their te-form like in noude (のうで) and nounde (のうんで). In Dorogawa, su-ending verbs widely have an i-sound inserted.

In Okuyoshino, there is an increasing ‘Godan-isation’ of Ichidan verbs. For example, minai (見ない don’t look) becomes miran (見らん) instead of min (見ん). On the other hand, in Totsukawa, there are remnants of Nidan conjugation such as warawaruru (笑わるる get laughed at) and misasuru (見さする to make look), among others.

=== i-adjectives ===
Across all of Nara Prefecture, there is u-euphony like in akounaru (あこうなる to get red; akakunaru (赤くなる) in standard Japanese) and younai (ようない not good; yokunai (良くない) in standard Japanese). In Dorogawa, the stem of yoi (良い good) becomes an e (え), and so is conjugated as egatta (えがった was good; yokatta (よかった) in standard Japanese) and ekarya (えかりゃ if its good; yokereba (良ければ) in standard Japanese), etc.

=== Main expressions ===
==== Copula ====
Ja (じゃ) or da (だ) is used, with ja being predominant.

==== Negation ====
-n (-ん), -sen (-せん) or -yasen (-やせん) is used. For the hypothetical form, -nyaa (-にゃあ), -ndara (-んだら) or-nandara (-なんだら) is added to the -nai stem. For example, kakanyaa (書かにゃあ), kakandara (書かんだら) and kakanandara (書かなんだら); all meaning if (I) do not write. For the past tense form, -nda (-んだ) or -nanda (-なんだ) is added to the -nai stem, like in kakanda (書かんだ) and kakananda (書かなんだ); both meaning (I) did not write. Since the earlier Showa period, however, -nkatta (-んかった) has also been used. E.g., kakankatta (書かんかった).

==== Passive・Potential ====
Like standard Japanese, the ending -reru (-れる) is used for Godan verbs and the irregular verb suru (する to do), but for other verb types -yareru (-やれる) is used instead of -rareru (-られる). In Totsukawa, the Nidan endings -ruru (-るる) and -raruru (-らるる) survive. Examples of ways to say ‘to be able to see’ (miru koto ga dekiru (見ることができる) in standard Japanese) in the Okuyoshino dialect include: mieru (見える), miyareru (見やれる), mireru (見れる), you miru (よう見る) and miraruru (見られる).

==== Causative ====
The ending -su (-す) is used for Godan verbs and for suru whilst -sasu (-さす) is used for other verbs. In Totsukawa, Nidan conjugation has been retained. For example, ‘to make eat’ (tabesaseru (食べさせる) in standard Japanese) becomes tabesasu (食べさす) or tabesasuru (食べさする) (Totsukawa) in the Okuyoshino dialect.

==== Negative conjecture and volition ====
The ending -mai (-まい) is frequently used, attaching like in the following examples:

- Kako mai (書こうまい (I) won’t write)
- Nakamai (泣かまい (he/she) probably won’t cry)
- Semai (せまい (he/she) probably won’t do ~)
- Kiyashimai (来やしまい (he/she) probably won’t come).

==== Progressive and perfective aspects ====
There is a distinction between the progressive and perfective aspects in the Okuyoshino dialect. The progressive aspect is expressed with variations of -oru (-おる), including furiyoru (降りよる), furyoru (降りょる), furyooru (降りょおる), furryoru (降っりょる) and furoru (降ろる); all of which mean ‘it is raining’, and the perfective aspect is expressed with a variation of -te oru (-ておる): futtoru (降っとる it has rained). As another example, the sentence yuki furiyoru (雪降りよる) expresses ‘falling snow’ whilst yuki futtoru (雪降っとる) expresses the state of ‘snow having fallen’.

==== Attitudinal expressions ====
Whereas bound auxiliaries and modal verbs are used for attitudinal expressions in the Nara dialect, the Okuyoshino dialect only uses sentence-ending particles for the same purpose. There are subtle regional differences in the usage of attitudinal expressions, with even the same forms sometimes having different meanings depending on area. The sentence-ending particles naa (なあ) and no (のう) are frequently used across Nara Prefecture, with naa used for disdain and no used for respect in the Okuyoshino dialect, and the inverse in the Nara dialect. Even within Okuyoshino, nora (のうら) is used in Totsukawa for respect and affection whilst in Shimokitayama nora is used for disdain and noe (のうえ) used for respect. In Shimokitayama, neya (ねや) is used for affection, whilst in Ono and Tenkawa it is said niya and within Tenkawa also, nyo (にょう) is used in Dorogawa. Also in Dorogawa, the expression ikanshiyo (行かんしよ), meaning irasshai (いらっしゃい welcome), exists.

==== Particles ====
Omission of wo (を) rarely occurs, and wa (は) tends to change to a (あ) or ya (や), such as in makura a (枕あ) (makura wa (枕は the pillow is…)) and basu ya (バスや) (basu wa (バスは the bus is…).

Kendo (けんど) is commonly used as an adversative conjunctive particle (kedo (けど but). Resultatives that express cause or reason are numerous and intricate, including yotte (よって) and sakai (さかい) and their related terms, as well as node (ので), nde (んで), de (で) and shi (し), among others. In Totsukawa and Shimokitayama, sakai is absent and yotte is used.

Ko (こ) and ka (か) are used as interrogative and rhetorical sentence-ending particles, with attitudinal usage in some areas. In Ono and Tenkawa ko is used for respect and ka is used for disdain, but in Kamikitayama and Shimokitayama ko is used without an attitudinal nuance. In Shimokitayama, e (え) is used for respect and ka (か) for disdain, and kae (かえ) is also used in Kamikitayama for respect.

Shika (しか), dakeshika (だけしか) and dakeyoka (だけよか) are used as equivalents to the adverbial particles shika and dake (だけ only/just).

Ra (ら) and rai (らい), which are shared with the Kishu dialect, are frequently used for invitational and persuasive expressions, as seen in iko ra (行こうら) and iko rai (行こうらい) (both equivalent to iko yo (行こうよ let’s go).
