= Yoshino-Kumano National Park =

National park of Japan

- 吉野熊野国立公園
- IUCN category II (national park)
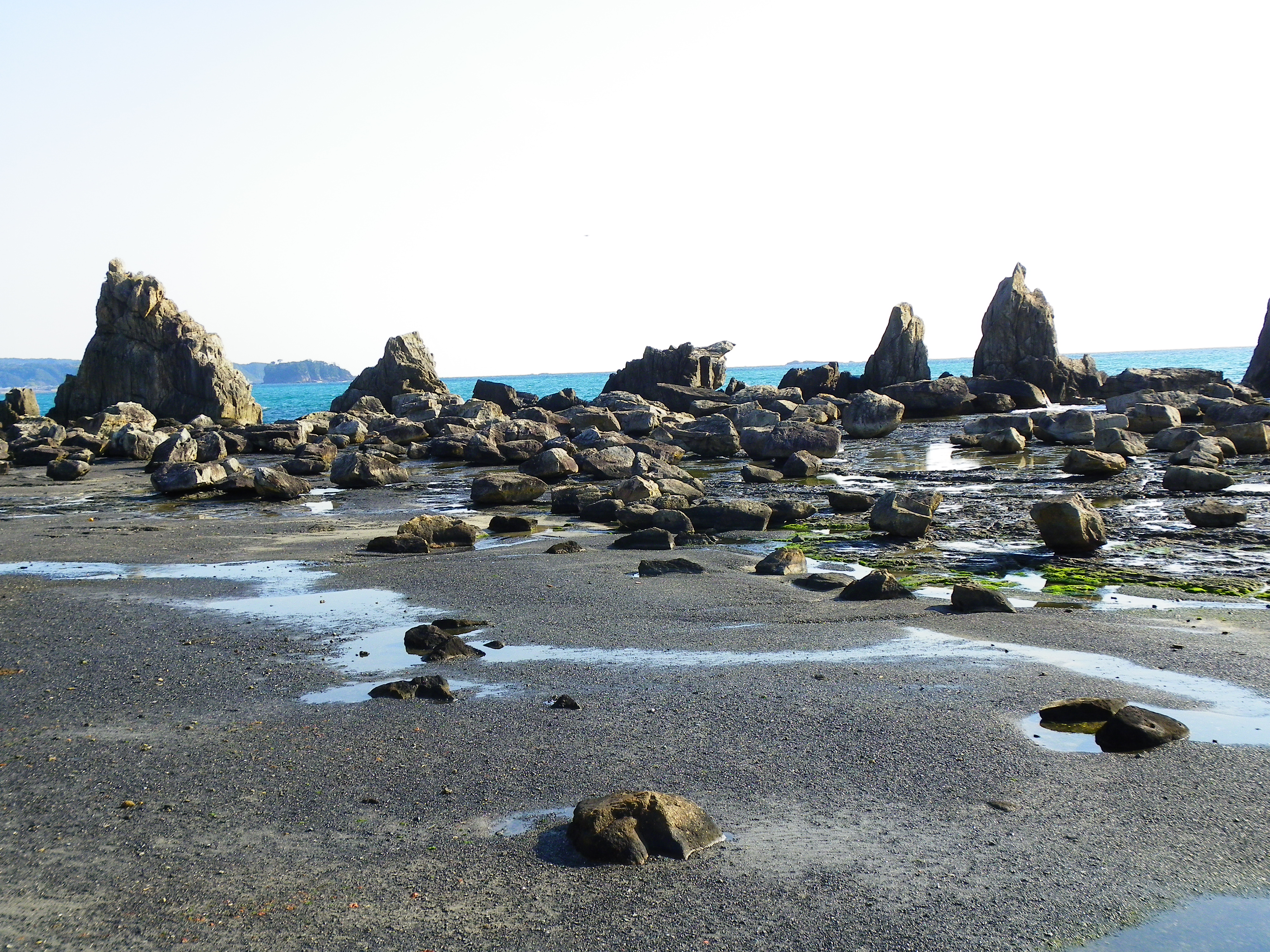
- Hashigui-iwa

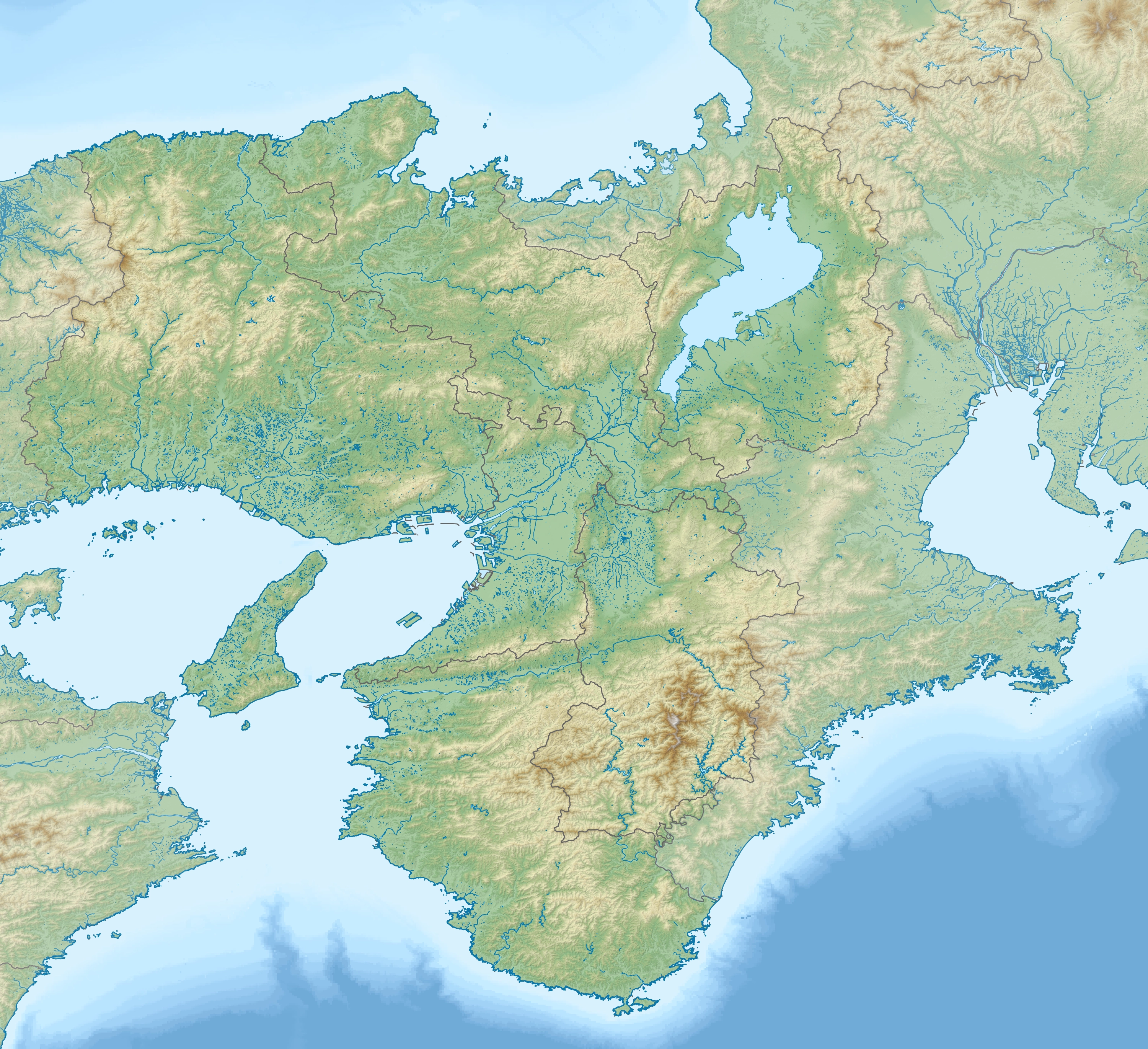
- Location within Kansai region Location within Japan
- Location: Kansai, Japan
- Coordinates: 33°47′56″N 135°56′24″E
- Area: 616.04 km^{2} (237.85 sq mi)
- Established: 1 February 1936
- Governing body: Ministry of the Environment (Japan)

Yoshino-Kumano National Park (吉野熊野国立公園, Yoshino-Kumano Kokuritsu Kōen) is a national park comprising several non-contiguous areas of Mie, Nara, and Wakayama Prefectures, in the Kansai region of Japan. Established in 1936, the park includes Mount Yoshino, celebrated for its cherry blossoms, as well as elements of the UNESCO World Heritage Site Sacred Sites and Pilgrimage Routes in the Kii Mountain Range.

== Places of interest ==
Notable places of interest include the Dorokyō Gorge, Kumano Hongū Taisha, Kushimoto Marine Park, Mount Ōdaigahara, Mount Ōmine, Mount Yoshino, and Nachi Falls.

== Related municipalities ==
The park crosses the borders of five cities, seven towns, and six villages in the following three prefectures:

- Mie: Kihō, Kumano, Mihama, Ōdai, Owase
- Nara: Gojō, Kamikitayama, Kawakami, Shimokitayama, Tenkawa, Totsukawa, Yoshino
- Wakayama: Kitayama, Kushimoto, Nachikatsuura, Shingū, Taiji, Tanabe

== See also ==
- List of national parks of Japan
- Kumano Kodō
