= Tanize Suspension Bridge =

Tanize Suspension Bridge 谷瀬の吊り橋
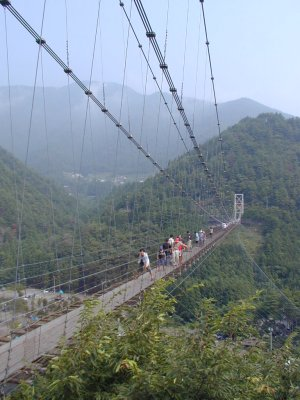
- Large Bridge in Totsukawa
- Coordinates: 34°06′05″N 135°45′46″E
- Carries: People
- Crosses: Totsukawa River (Kumano River)
- Locale: Ueno-tanize; Totsukawa Village, Yoshino District, Nara Prefecture
- Other name: Tanize Line
- Owner: Totsukawa Village

Characteristics
- Design: Suspension Bridge
- Material: Wire cable
- Total length: 297.7 m (977 ft)
- Width: 2 m (6 ft 7 in)
- Height: 54 m (177 ft)

History
- Construction end: 1954
- Construction cost: ¥8,000,000 (Note: ¥8 million (1954) (equivalent to ¥53.78 million or US$355,282.01 in 2024))

Location
- Location of the Tanize Suspension Bridge on a map

Tanize Suspension Bridge (Japanese: 谷瀬の吊り橋, Hepburn: tanize no tsuribashi), alternatively known as the Tanise Suspension Bridge, is a bridge in Totsukawa, Nara. It is one of Japan's oldest and longest extant wire suspension bridges. The bridge, locally known as 谷瀬大橋 (Tanize-ōhashi, lit. 'tanize great bridge') has a commemorative plaque with 谷瀬橋 (tanize-bashi, lit. 'tanize bridge') engraved onto it.

== Overview ==
The bridge spans the Totsukawa river (Kumano River), and connects Totsukawa village and Tanize (Uenoji), which lies on the other side of the bridge. The bridge is 54 m (177 ft) from the surface of the river and has a deck spanning 297.7 m (977 ft) long. In 1954, the construction of the bridge was finished. At the time of completion, it was the longest steel wire suspension bridge in Japan. In 1994, the Ryuujin Suspension Bridge, located in Ibaraki Prefecture, was completed and acquired the title as longest suspension bridge in Japan.

According to Rom International, prior to the completion of the suspension bridge, every time someone wanted to cross the pass, they had to cross the Totsukawa River, come down through the Tanize Valley, cross a log bridge, and then crawl up a steep slope. If the river flooded, the log bridge would be swept away. The people of the region put together ¥20,000 to ¥30,000 per household, totaling over ¥8 million, and constructed a large suspension bridge with the funds. At the time of the Post war reconstruction, an instructor's starting salary was only ¥7,800 and 10 kilograms of rice was only \765. 80% of the construction costs were paid by the residents, however, the convenience of the new route was long-awaited, and became an icon within the village. Thus, they prohibit crossing the bridge on bicycles and motorcycles, with an exception made for residents, and only allow crossing by foot for tourists.

Formerly, children who attended school in Uenoji used the bride to get to and from school, however, as the school closed in 2010, the suspension bridge became primarily used by tourists.

The center construction of the bridge has roughly 80 cm (31 in) long planks, and 30 cm (12 in) wide, with the planks laid on top of the wires. The river is visible through the wire mesh deck of the bridge. The bridge is said to move considerably if wind blows. The village forbids more than 20 people on the bridge at once due to the danger of a potential collapse if the bridge were to exceed its weight limit. as the bridge attracts heavy tourism. During said periods of heavy tourism, traffic is restricted to one direction, from Uenoji to Tanize and security is present to ensure compliance, because of the potential danger presented by the bridge going over capacity. In the case of their tourism protocols being implemented, access to the bridge is made free, with a paid bus that returns you from the opposite side of the bridge.

On 28 September 2021, it was acknowledged by the Japan Society of Civil Engineers.

== Access ==
=== Car ===
- Japan National Route 168

=== Bus ===
- Nara Kotsu Bus Lines(Yagishingū Line・Totsukawa Line) Uenoji Stop

== Gallery ==
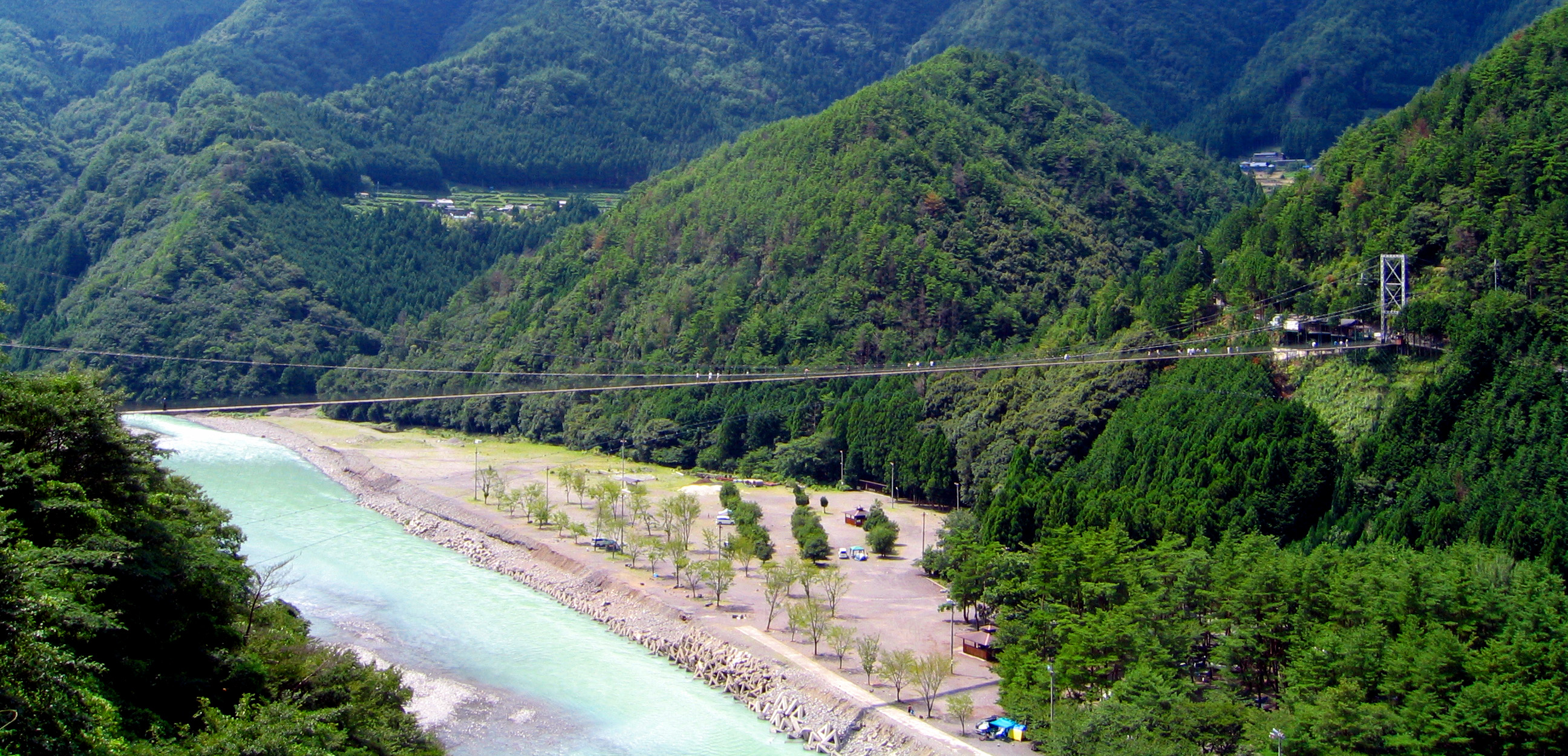

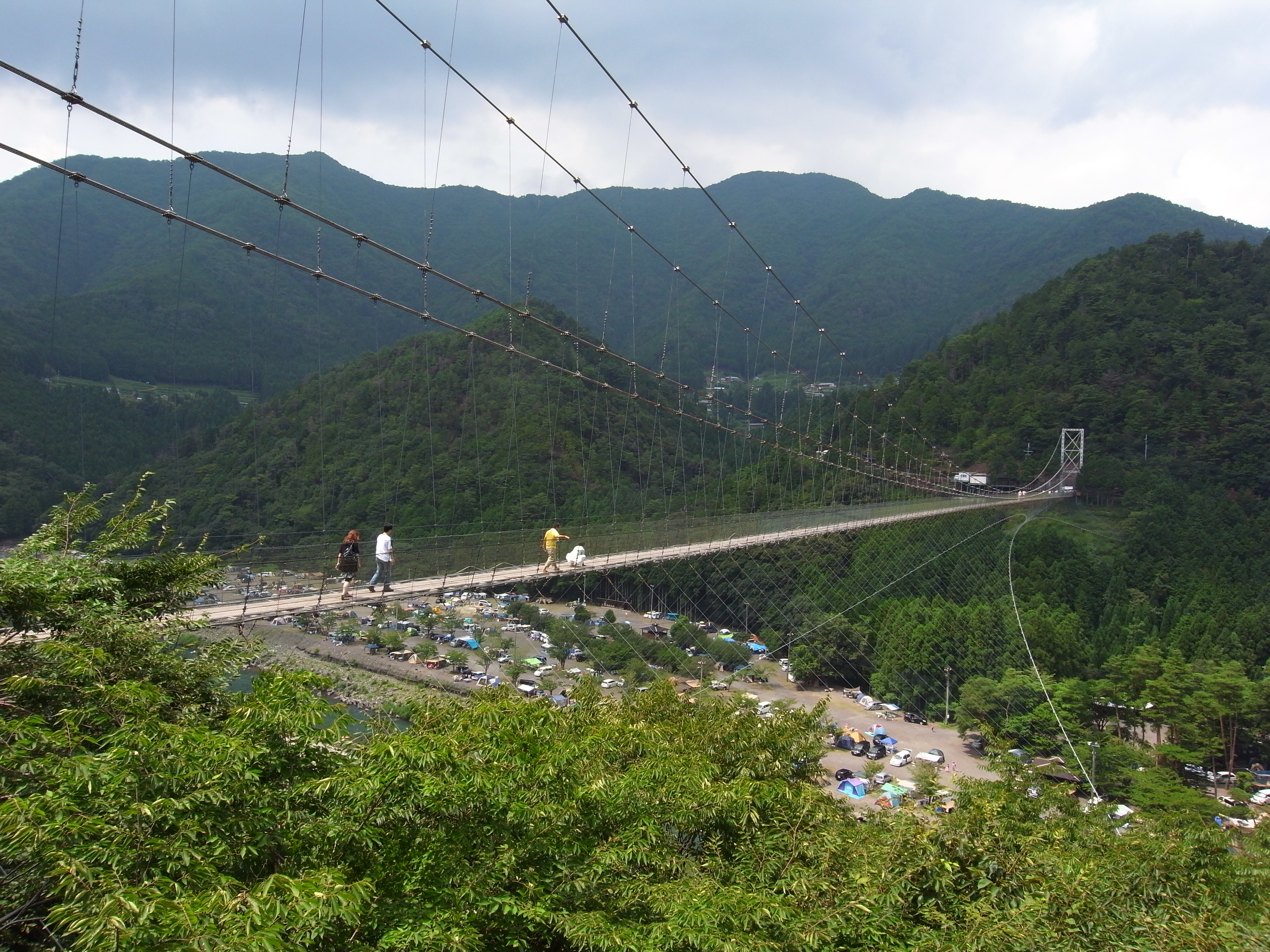

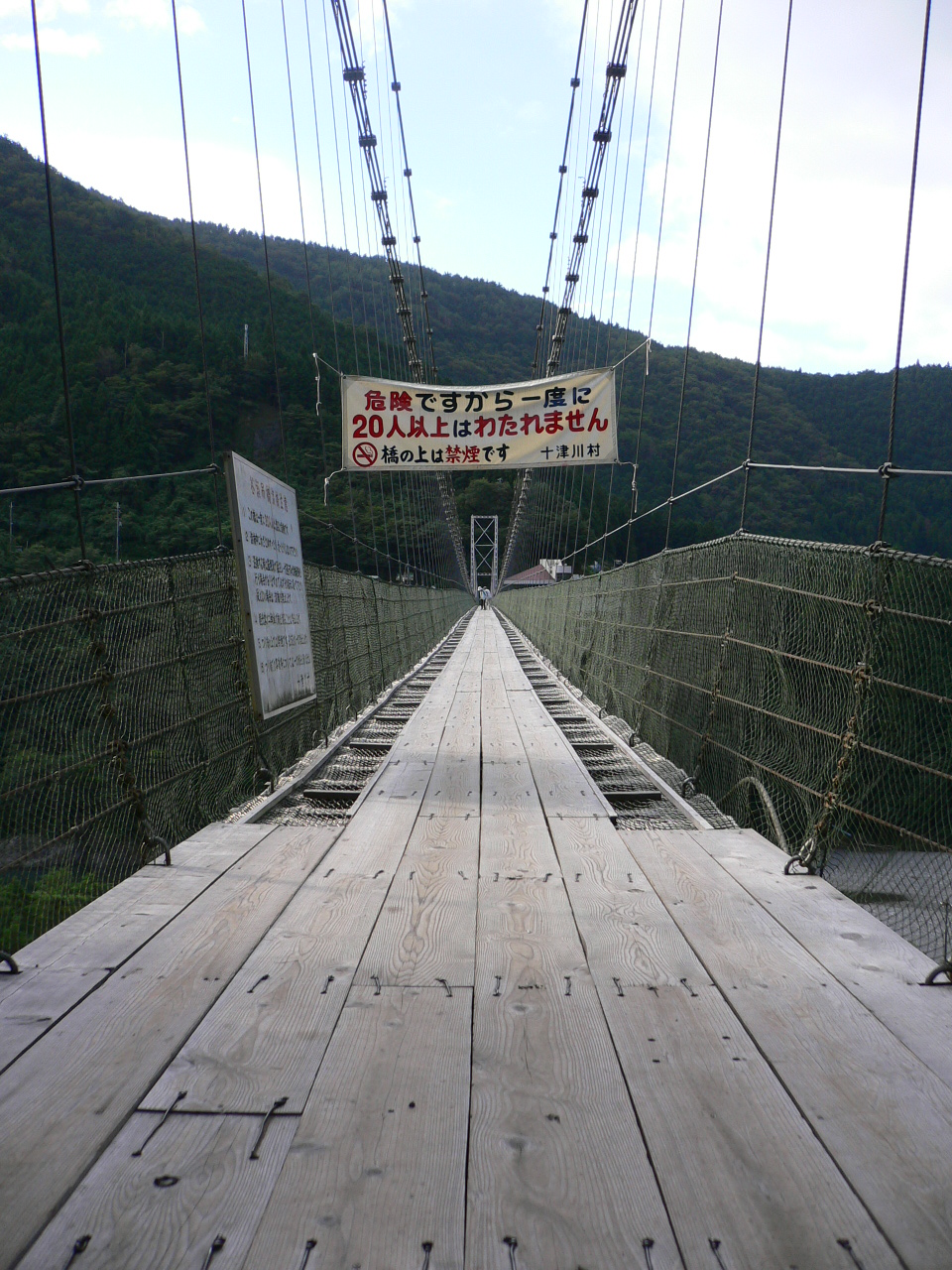

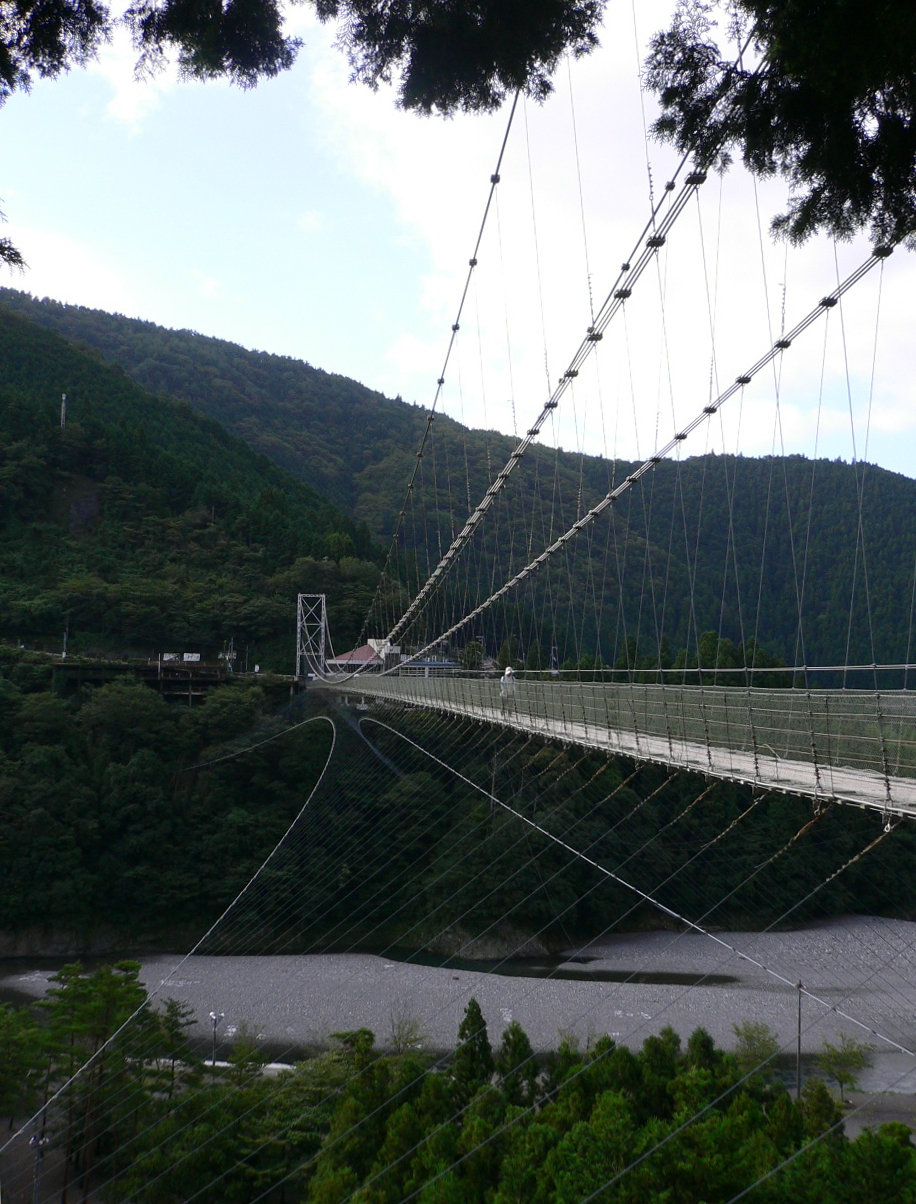

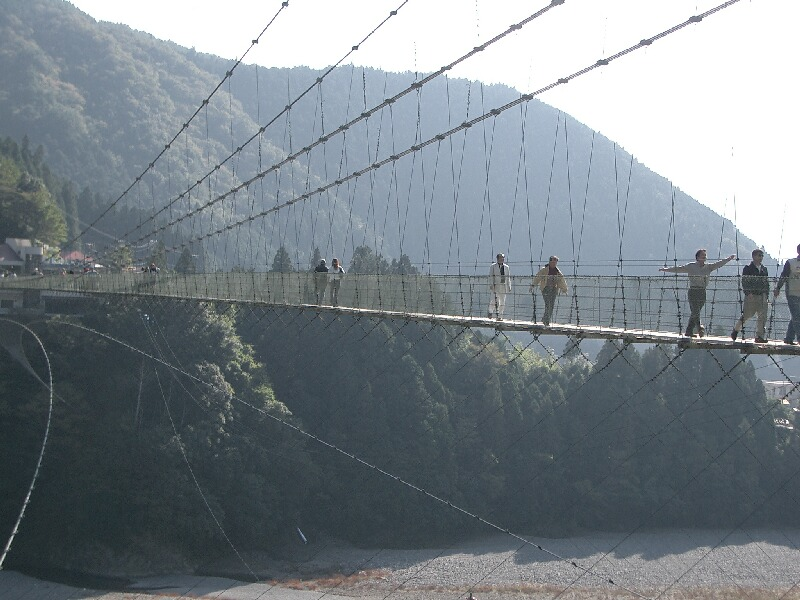

== Works cited ==
- ロム・インターナショナル（編） (2005-02-01). 道路地図 びっくり!博学知識. KAWADE夢文庫. Kawade Shobō Shinsha. ISBN 4-309-49566-4.
