= Ōtō =

Ōtō may refer to:

- Ōtō, Fukuoka
- Ōtō, Nara
- Ōtō, Wakayama
- Keihan Ōtō Line
