= Uchi River Rock Carvings =

Uchigawa Rock Carvings
- 宇智川磨崖碑 (Japanese)
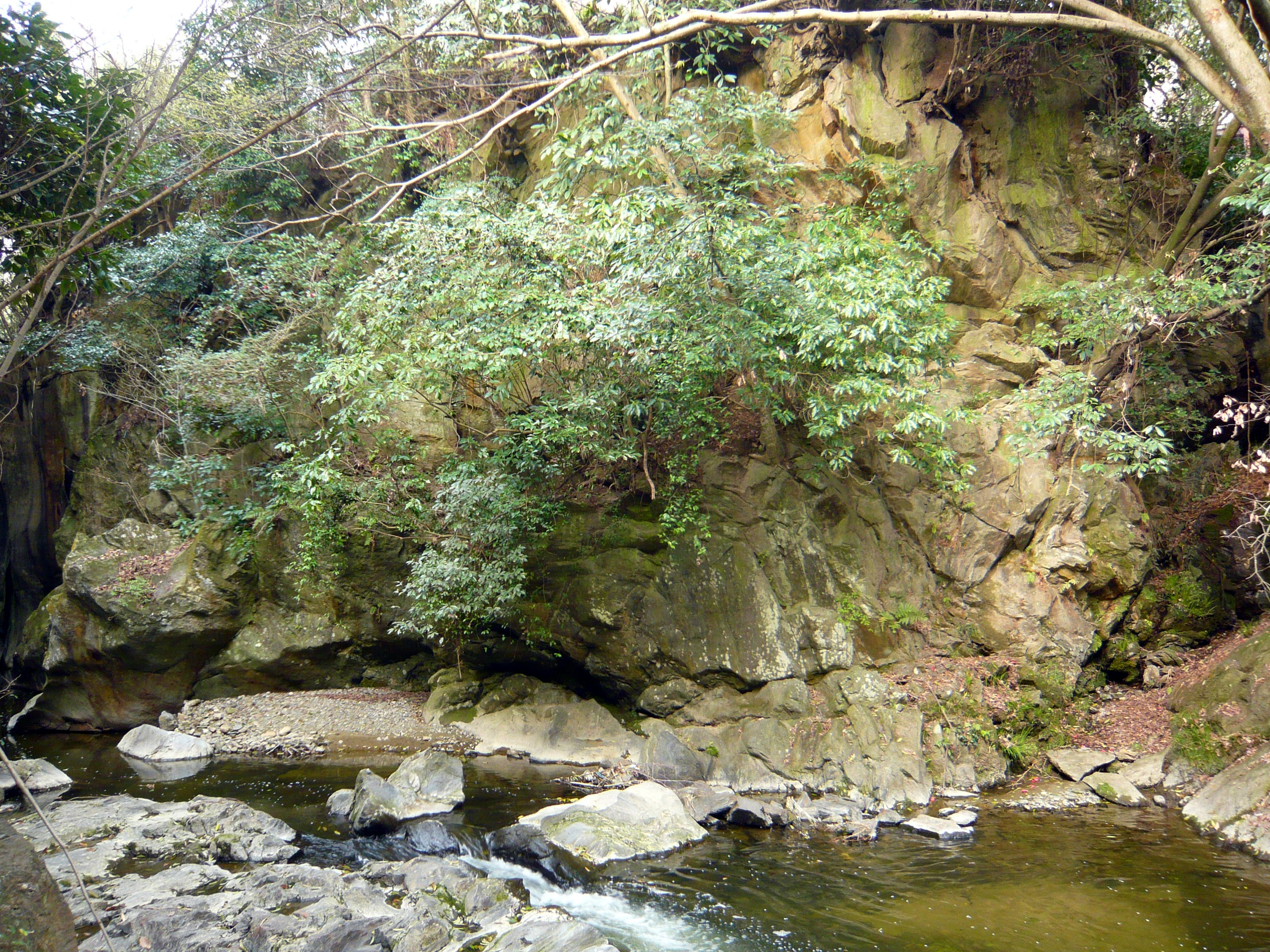
- Uchigawa Rock Carvings

- Uchigawa Rock Carvings Uchi River Rock Carvings (Japan)
- Interactive map of Uchigawa Rock Carvings
- 34°21′26″N 135°42′41″E
- Periods: Nara period
- Location: Gojō, Nara, Japan
- Region: Kansai region

Uchigawa Rock Carvings (宇智川磨崖碑, Uchigawa magaihi) is a Nara Period Buddhist carving on a rock wall on the left bank of the Uchigawa River (a tributary of the Yoshino River) flowing through the Kojima-chō neighborhood of the city of Gojō, Nara Prefecture in the Kansai region, Japan. It was designated as a National Historic Sites of Japan in 1921.

== Overview ==
The term magaibutsu (磨崖仏) refers to a Buddhist figure carved directly into a natural rock faces or cliffside. The Uchigawa Rock Carvings are carved into the crystalline rock wall at the bottom of the Fudo Bridge that spans the gorge of the Uchigawa River. It consists of an inscription with portions of two chapters of the Mahāyāna Mahāparinirvāṇa Sūtra (the "Nirvana Sutra"), which was particularly important for the development of East Asian Buddhism. Although parts of the inscription have become indecipherable or difficult to read due to weathering over the years, the Nara Period Japanese era name of Hōki is still visible, indicating that the carving was made in either 776 or 778 AD. To the left of the inscription is a statue of Kannon Bosatsu standing on a lotus throne, approximately 60 cm-tall, which is believed to be contemporary with the sutra inscription. The intention behind this monument is unclear, but it has been thought to be related to the nearby temple of Eisan-ji, which is said to have been founded in 719 to the east, and the grave of its founder, Fujiwara no Muchimaro.

The carving date from the late Nara period to early Heian period, except for the Jūichimen Kannon, which was a later Muromachi period addition. There is an unsubstantiated legend that the site was a quarry which supplied the material for the foundation stones for the buildings at Tōdai-ji. The site is approximately four kilometers by mountain trail southeast of Tōdai-ji, or 9.2 kilometers (24 minutes) by car.

== See also ==
- List of Historic Sites of Japan (Nara)
