= Nosegawa, Nara =

Nosegawa 野迫川村
- Village
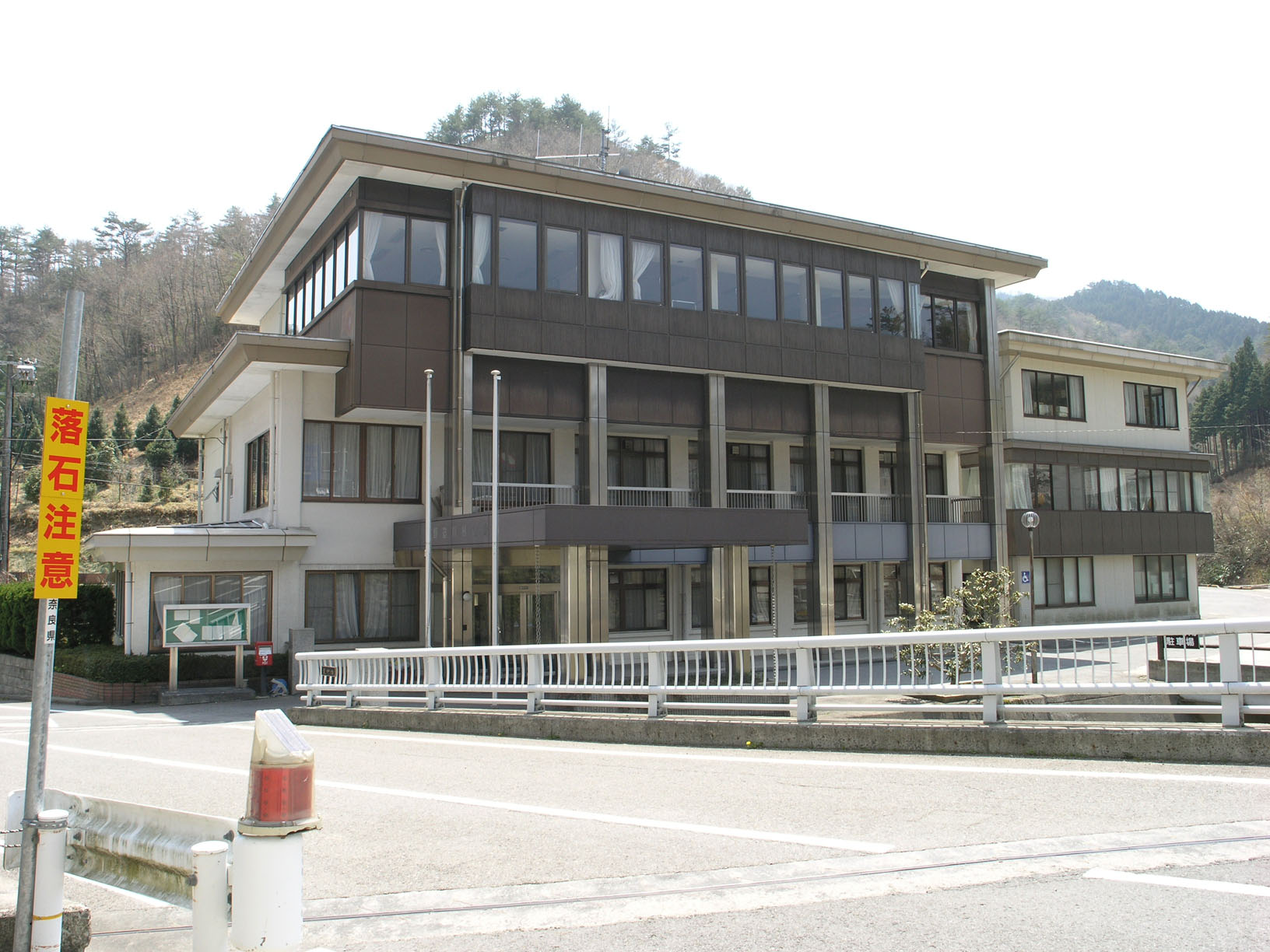
- Nosegawa Village Hall

- Flag Seal
- Location of Nosegawa in Nara Prefecture

- Location in Japan
- Coordinates: 34°09′58″N 135°37′59″E
- Country: Japan
- Region: Kansai
- Prefecture: Nara
- District: Yoshino

Area
  - Total: 154.90 km^{2} (59.81 sq mi)

Population (April 1, 2024)
  - Total: 424
  - Density: 2.74/km^{2} (7.09/sq mi)
- Time zone: UTC+09:00 (JST)
- City hall address: 84 Kitamata, Nosegawa-mura, Yoshino-gun, Nara-ken 648-0305
- Website: Official website
- Symbols
- Bird: Japanese bush-warbler
- Flower: Rhododendron
- Tree: Betula platyphylla

Nosegawa (野迫川村, Nosegawa-mura) is a village located in Yoshino District, Nara Prefecture, Japan.

== Population ==
As of 1 April 2024, the village had an estimated population of 424 in 199 households, and a population density of 2.7 persons per km^{2}. The total area of the village is 154.90 km^{2} (59.81 sq mi). As of October 1, 2016, Nosegawa was the smallest village by population located on the four main islands of Japan.

=== Historical demographics ===
Per Japanese census data, the population of Nosegawa is as shown below

Historical population
Year	Pop.	±%
1940	3,114	—
1950	2,726	−12.5%
1960	2,880	+5.6%
1970	1,405	−51.2%
1980	1,121	−20.2%
1990	926	−17.4%
2000	783	−15.4%
2010	524	−33.1%
2020	357	−31.9%

== Geography ==
Located in southwestern portion of Nara Prefecture, it is surrounded by the Kii Mountain Range. Mount Natsumushi (1349 m) and Mount Arakami (1260 m) are two major mountains in Nosegawa. Many rivers, such as the Iketsu River, run through the village and are eventually united by the Totsukawa River which flows to the Pacific Ocean.

=== Surrounding municipalities ===
Nara Prefecture

- Gojō
- Totsukawa

Wakayama Prefecture

- Aridagawa
- Katsuragi
- Kōya
- Tanabe

=== Climate ===
Nosegawa has a humid subtropical climate (Köppen Cfa) characterized by warm summers and cool winters with light to no snowfall. The average annual temperature in Nosegawa is 11.3 °C. The average annual rainfall is 2119 mm with September as the wettest month. The temperatures are highest on average in August, at around 22.7 °C, and lowest in January, at around -0.4 °C.

== History ==
The area of Nosegawa was part of ancient Yamato Province. The village of Nosegawa was established on April 1, 1889 with the creation of the modern municipalities system.

== Government ==
Nosegawa has a mayor-council form of government with a directly elected mayor and a unicameral village council of seven members. Nosegawa, collectively with the other municipalities of Yoshino District, contributes two members to the Nara Prefectural Assembly. In terms of national politics, the village is part of the Nara 3rd district of the lower house of the Diet of Japan.

== Education ==
Nosegawa has one public combined elementary/junior high school operated by the village government. The village does not have a high school.

== Sister city ==
- Vysoké Tatry, Slovakia
