= Totsukawa =

Totsukawa 十津川村
- Village
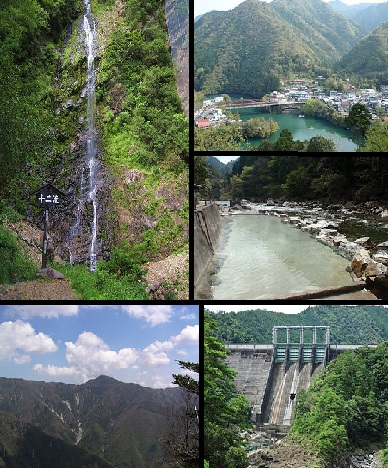
- Clockwise from top left: Jyuni Waterfall, Totsukawa Spa area, Kamiyu Spa area, Kazeya Dam, Mount Shaka

- Flag Seal
- Location of Totsukawa in Nara Prefecture
- Coordinates: 33°59′18″N 135°47′33″E
- Country: Japan
- Region: Kansai
- Prefecture: Nara
- District: Yoshino

Government
  - Mayor: Hisao Nakashima Hisao

Area
  - Total: 672.38 km^{2} (259.61 sq mi)

Population (January 1, 2025)
  - Total: 2,657
  - Density: 3.952/km^{2} (10.23/sq mi)
- Time zone: UTC+09:00 (JST)
- City hall address: 225-1 Ōaza Ohara, Totsukawa-mura, Yoshino-gun, Nara-ken 637-1333
- Climate: Cfa
- Website: Official website
- Symbols
- Bird: Japanese bush warbler
- Flower: Rhododendron
- Tree: Cryptomeria

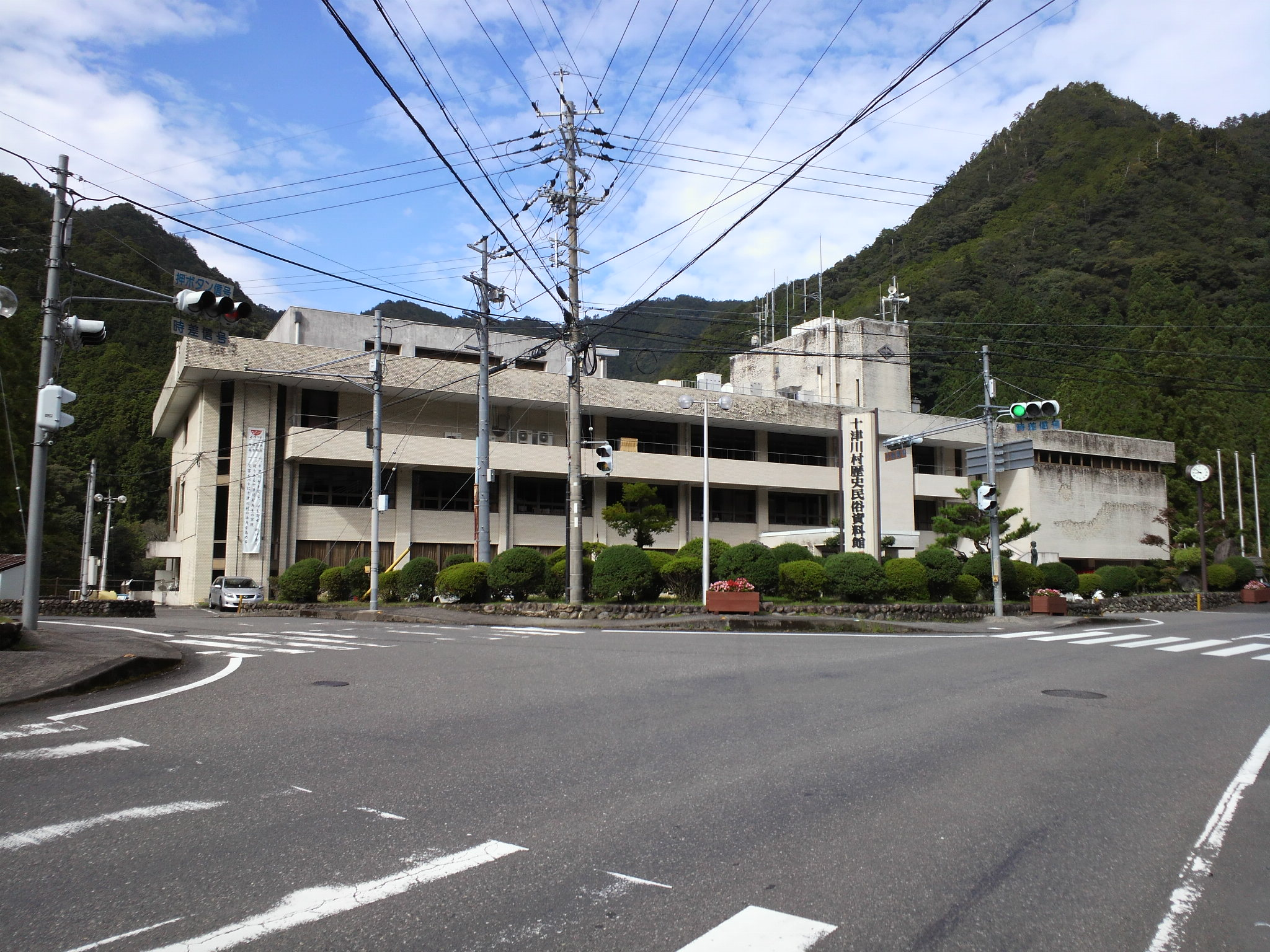
Totsukawa Village Hall

Totsukawa (Japanese: 十津川村, Hepburn: Totsukawa-mura) is a geographically large village in the Yoshino District of Nara, Japan. As of 1 January 2025, the village had an estimated population of 1,322 and a population density of 4.0 persons per km^{2}. The total area of the village is 672.38 km^{2} (259.61 sq mi).

== Geography ==
Totsukawa is located in the Okuyoshino region, which is in the southern part of the Yoshino region, and has been isolated from the surrounding areas by the Kii Mountains. It is the largest village in Nara in terms of area, and the fifth largest village in Japan.

=== Surrounding municipalities ===
Nara Prefecture

- Gojō
- Kamikitayama
- Shimokitayama
- Nosegawa

Mie Prefecture

- Kumano

Wakayama Prefecture

- Shingū
- Tanabe
- Kitayama

=== Climate ===
Totsukawa has a humid subtropical climate (Köppen climate classification Cfa), which is hot and humid in the summer (above 30 °C (86 °F)) and is somewhat cold in the winter with temperatures dropping to around freezing (0 °C (32 °F)).

Climate data for Totsukawa (1991−2020 normals, extremes 1977−present)
Month	Jan	Feb	Mar	Apr	May	Jun	Jul	Aug	Sep	Oct	Nov	Dec	Year
Record high °C (°F)	17.1 (62.8)	20.9 (69.6)	26.0 (78.8)	31.6 (88.9)	34.5 (94.1)	35.8 (96.4)	39.5 (103.1)	39.4 (102.9)	36.0 (96.8)	30.4 (86.7)	23.6 (74.5)	21.7 (71.1)	39.5 (103.1)
Mean daily maximum °C (°F)	8.1 (46.6)	9.1 (48.4)	13.4 (56.1)	19.2 (66.6)	23.7 (74.7)	26.1 (79.0)	30.2 (86.4)	31.4 (88.5)	27.4 (81.3)	21.6 (70.9)	15.9 (60.6)	10.3 (50.5)	19.7 (67.5)
Daily mean °C (°F)	3.4 (38.1)	4.0 (39.2)	7.3 (45.1)	12.4 (54.3)	17.0 (62.6)	20.5 (68.9)	24.3 (75.7)	25.0 (77.0)	21.6 (70.9)	16.0 (60.8)	10.4 (50.7)	5.4 (41.7)	13.9 (57.1)
Mean daily minimum °C (°F)	−0.3 (31.5)	−0.1 (31.8)	2.3 (36.1)	6.8 (44.2)	11.6 (52.9)	16.4 (61.5)	20.4 (68.7)	21.0 (69.8)	17.9 (64.2)	12.1 (53.8)	6.3 (43.3)	1.5 (34.7)	9.7 (49.4)
Record low °C (°F)	−6.0 (21.2)	−7.2 (19.0)	−4.4 (24.1)	−1.9 (28.6)	2.1 (35.8)	8.2 (46.8)	13.0 (55.4)	13.8 (56.8)	8.9 (48.0)	1.6 (34.9)	−1.6 (29.1)	−4.8 (23.4)	−7.2 (19.0)
Average precipitation mm (inches)	79.0 (3.11)	103.1 (4.06)	162.6 (6.40)	168.4 (6.63)	208.0 (8.19)	341.0 (13.43)	395.7 (15.58)	299.5 (11.79)	351.4 (13.83)	219.3 (8.63)	109.9 (4.33)	81.8 (3.22)	2,538.2 (99.93)
Average precipitation days (≥ 1.0 mm)	8.8	9.5	11.9	10.4	10.8	14.0	13.6	12.3	11.6	10.6	8.4	8.5	130.4
Mean monthly sunshine hours	122.1	122.9	159.0	184.2	183.5	120.5	149.9	180.0	135.1	138.9	129.6	123.6	1,747.2
Source: Japan Meteorological Agency

== Demographics ==
The population of Totsukawa in 2020 was 3,061 people. Totsukawa has been conducting censuses since 1920.

Historical population
Year	Pop.	±%
1920	13,157	—
1925	11,445	−13.0%
1930	11,079	−3.2%
1935	12,093	+9.2%
1940	12,271	+1.5%
1945	12,118	−1.2%
1950	12,145	+0.2%
1955	12,503	+2.9%
1960	15,588	+24.7%
1965	10,776	−30.9%
1970	8,502	−21.1%
1975	8,086	−4.9%
1980	6,627	−18.0%
1985	6,001	−9.4%
1990	5,516	−8.1%
1995	5,202	−5.7%
2000	4,854	−6.7%
2005	4,390	−9.6%
2010	4,112	−6.3%
2015	3,508	−14.7%
2020	3,061	−12.7%
Totsukawa population statistics

== History ==
=== Etymology ===
The name of the Totsukawa River 遠津川 (totsukawa), which the village is named after was originally composed of the kanji 遠 (to), meaning distant, 津 (tsu), meaning harbor (or port), 川 (kawa), meaning river, as the river was, and especially for the time its name is first said to appear (c. 1142 AD), far away from any ports. Because the village built along the river is also distant from the capital, 都 (to), it was given the name 十津川村 (totsukawa-mura), as a play-on-words meaning village of the river distant from any ports or the capital. The word used for the first kanji in the current name, 十 (to), and the original name for the river, 遠 (to), as well as the word for capital, 都 (to), all contain a reading of to.

=== End of Kamakura and Muromachi period ===
In 1333, Emperor Go-Daigo overthrew the Kamakura Shogunate and thus began the Kenmu Restoration. However, many samurai, including Ashikaga Takauji were dissatisfied with the new policies, and so a struggle ensued between them and the emperor. As a result of the struggle, the emperor fled to Yamato Province, which composed much of present-day Nara Prefecture and included Totsukawa within. There he established the Southern Court. Totsukawa was deeply intertwined with the southern court, and Prince Morinaga once sought refuge there. Old documents written by the second emperor of the court, Gomurakami and Morinaga's son, Prince Okura are still kept and preserved within the village, and contain directives to the people of the village to assist the southern court. The people were said to be skilled martial artists and hunters, which is attributed to their recognition by multiple successive emperors within southern court.

=== Edo period ===
In 1585, Toyotomi Hidenaga, half-brother of Toyotomi Hideyoshi was appointed governor of Yamato Province, Kii Province and Izumi Province, and made lord of Kōriyama Castle. Two years later, in 1587, Hidenaga commenced a comprehensive land survey of Totsukawa, as expected of someone in his role. Kobori Masatsugu. appointed survey commissioner, executed the survey at Hidenaga's request. Following the survey, Totsukawa was subject to mura uke seido where each village would pay taxes as a unit.

=== Meiji Restoration to World War II ===
In 1869, one year after the beginning of the Meiji Restoration following the fall of the Tokugawa Shogunate, during significant changes in Japan, Totsukawa was incorporated into Nara Prefecture. In 1871, the people of the village were recognized for their service during the end of the shogunate and during the Boshin War, some were even granted the title of samurai.

In 1873, the land tax law was changed, and Totsukawa became taxes as well, instituting a plethora of changes to follow.

In 1889, a major flood happened in Totsukawa, causing widespread destruction. In result, many citizens moved to Hokkaido and developed a new village there. The first and then governor of Nara, Saisho Atsushi, issued a notice giving his respects and condolences, as well as informing them of disaster relief in the form of ¥2,000 (Note: ¥2,000 (1889) (equivalent to ¥8.69 million or US$57,421.56 in 2024)) in gold from Emperor Meiji. The residents opted to name the new settlement “Shintotsukawa” (Note: shin (wiktionary:新) means new), literally “New Totsukawa".

The villages of Kitatotsukawa, Totsukawa, Totsukawa Hanazono, Nakatotsukawa, Nishitotsukawa, Minamitotsukawa and Higashitotsukawa were established on April 1, 1889, with the creation of the modern municipalities system. On June 19, 1890, these villages merged to form the village of Totsukawa.

== Government ==
Totsukawa has a mayor-council form of government with a directly elected mayor and a unicameral village council of nine members. Totsukawa, collectively with the other municipalities of Yoshino District, contributes two members to the Nara Prefectural Assembly. In terms of national politics, the village is part of the Nara 3rd district of the lower house of the Diet of Japan.

== Economy ==
The main industries are forestry, agriculture, and the farming and processing of river fish such as sweetfish.

== Education ==
Totsukawa has two public elementary schools and one public junior high schools operated by the village government, and one public high school operated by the Nara Prefectural Board of Education.

== Transportation ==
=== Railways ===
Totsukawa has no passenger railway service. The nearest train station is Gojō Station on the JR West Wakayama Line.

=== Highways ===
- National Route 168
- National Route 169
- National Route 311
- National Route 425

== Sister cities ==
- Miyoshi, Tokushima, Japan
- Yatsushiro, Kumamoto, Japan

== Local attractions ==
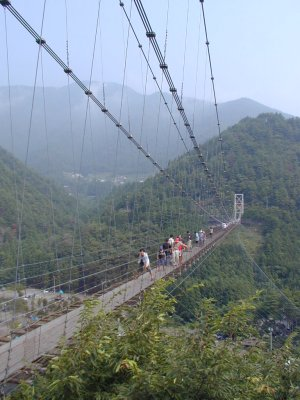
Tanize Suspension Bridge

=== Tanize Suspension Bridge ===
The Tanize Suspension Bridge (谷瀬の吊り橋, tanize no tsuribashi) is a suspension bridge known for the Yuredaiko, an annual drum festival on the bridge held on August 4 of every year. It is one of Japan's longest steel-wire suspension bridges, and is located in the Tanize/Uenoji area in northern Totsukawa. It was built in 1954 and is 54 m (177 ft) high and 297 m (974 ft) long. Each family in the village donated ¥2,000−3,000 towards the construction. The money collected from the villagers totaled approximately ¥8,000,000 (Note: ¥8 million (1954) (equivalent to ¥53.78 million or US$355,282.01 in 2024)) in donations.

=== Yaen gondolas ===
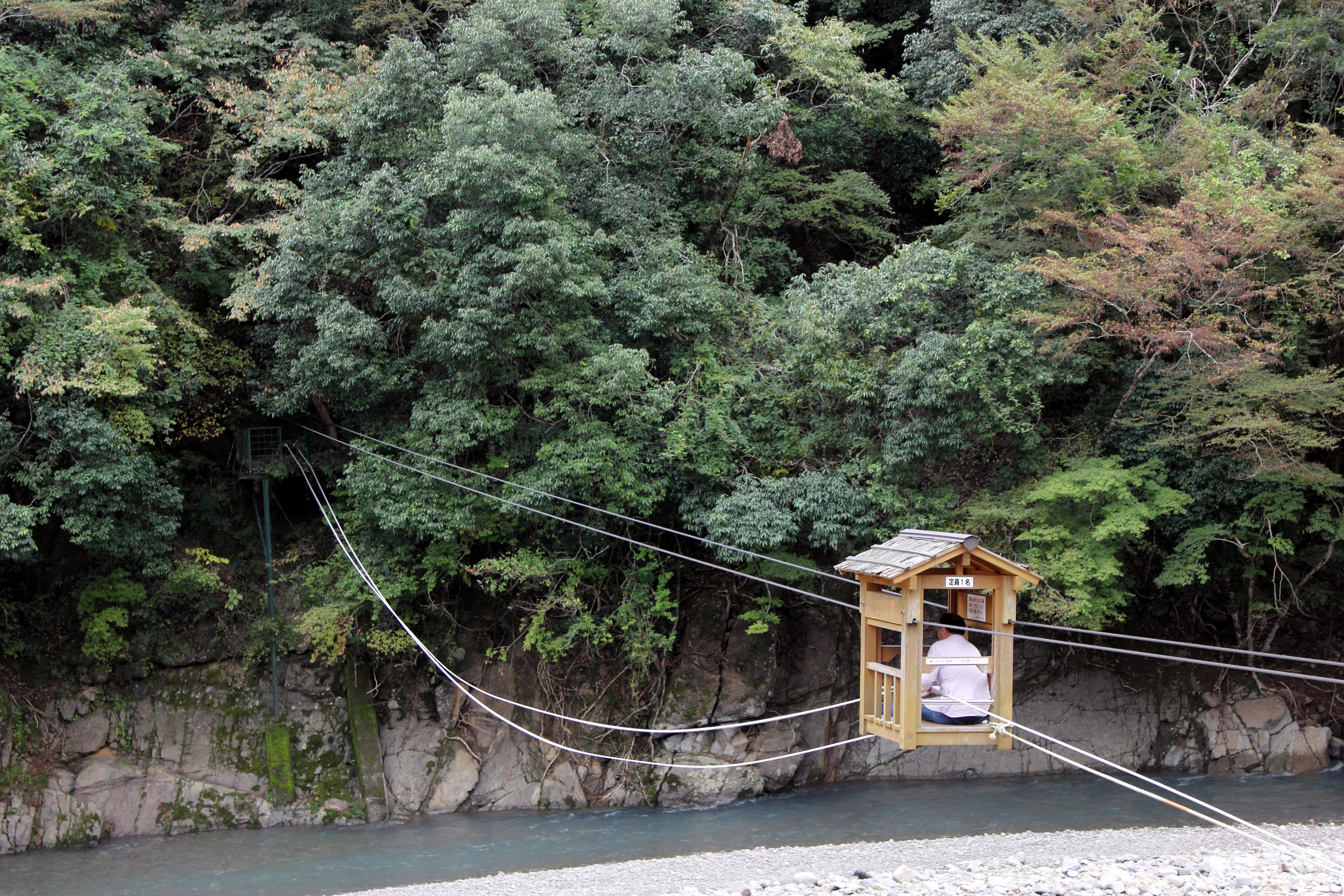
Totsukawa Yaen Gondalas

There are gondolas called yaen in Totsukawa village. Yaen are small gondolas hung from ropes above a river and move from shore to shore of the river, moving forward by pulling on a rope inside of the gondola. The name yaen comes from the Japanese word for wild monkey, and were named as such because a person using one has the appearance of a wild monkey climbing a vine. They were historically used for transportation across the river by the villagers, as it would only take the average person around 10 minutes to move the entire route. They are no longer used as a means of transportation, and are now only used as a novelty.

=== Sasa-no-taki waterfall ===
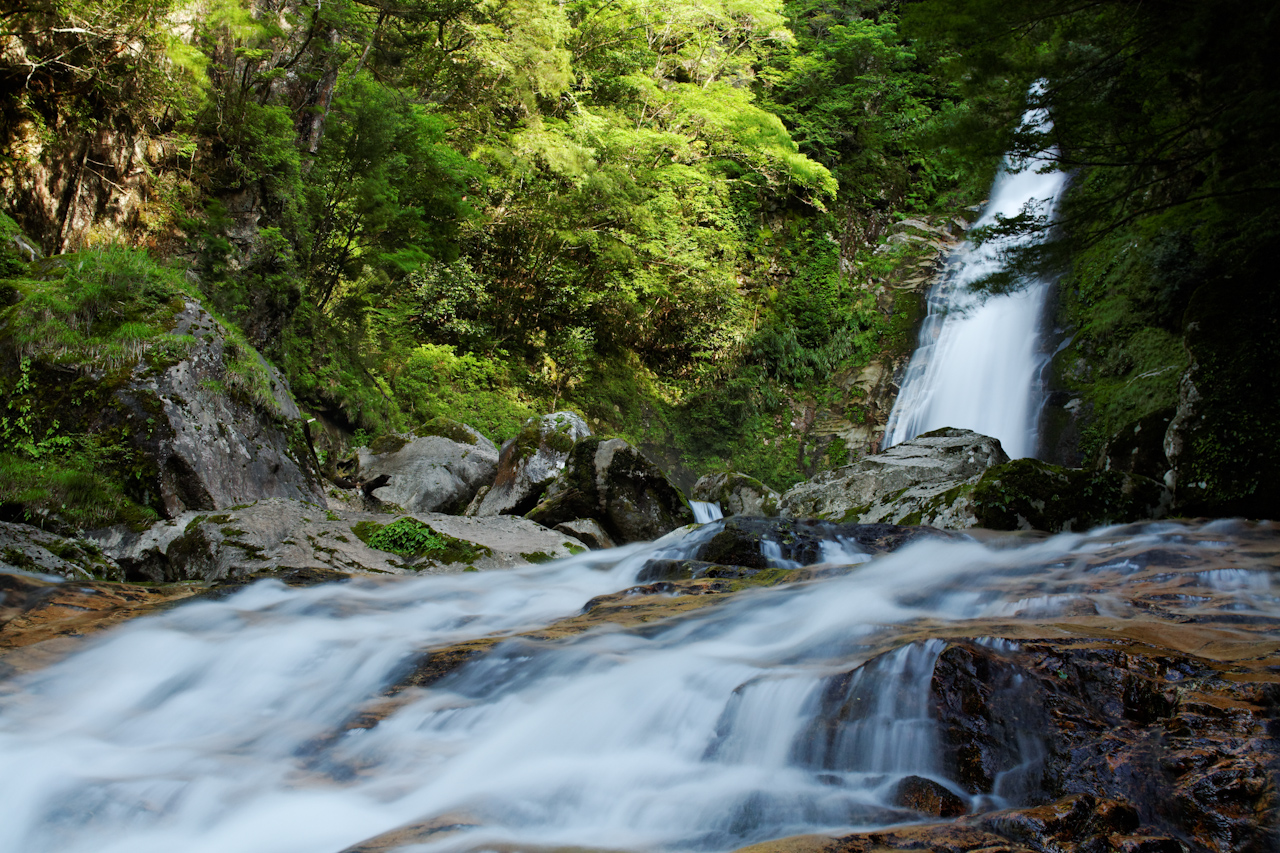
Sasa-no-taki Waterfall

Sasa-no-taki (笹の滝) is a waterfall located on the outskirts of Totsukawa, and is ranked by Kodansha as one of the 100 Best Waterfalls in Japan. It is about 32 m (105 ft) tall and 13 km (8.1 mi) away from Takikawa gorge, and has an altitude of 500 m (1,600 ft) with multiple hiking trails leading up to the waterfall. The area directly under the waterfall, however, has its access restricted due to the safety hazard imposed by the risk of falling rocks.

=== Tamaki Shrine ===
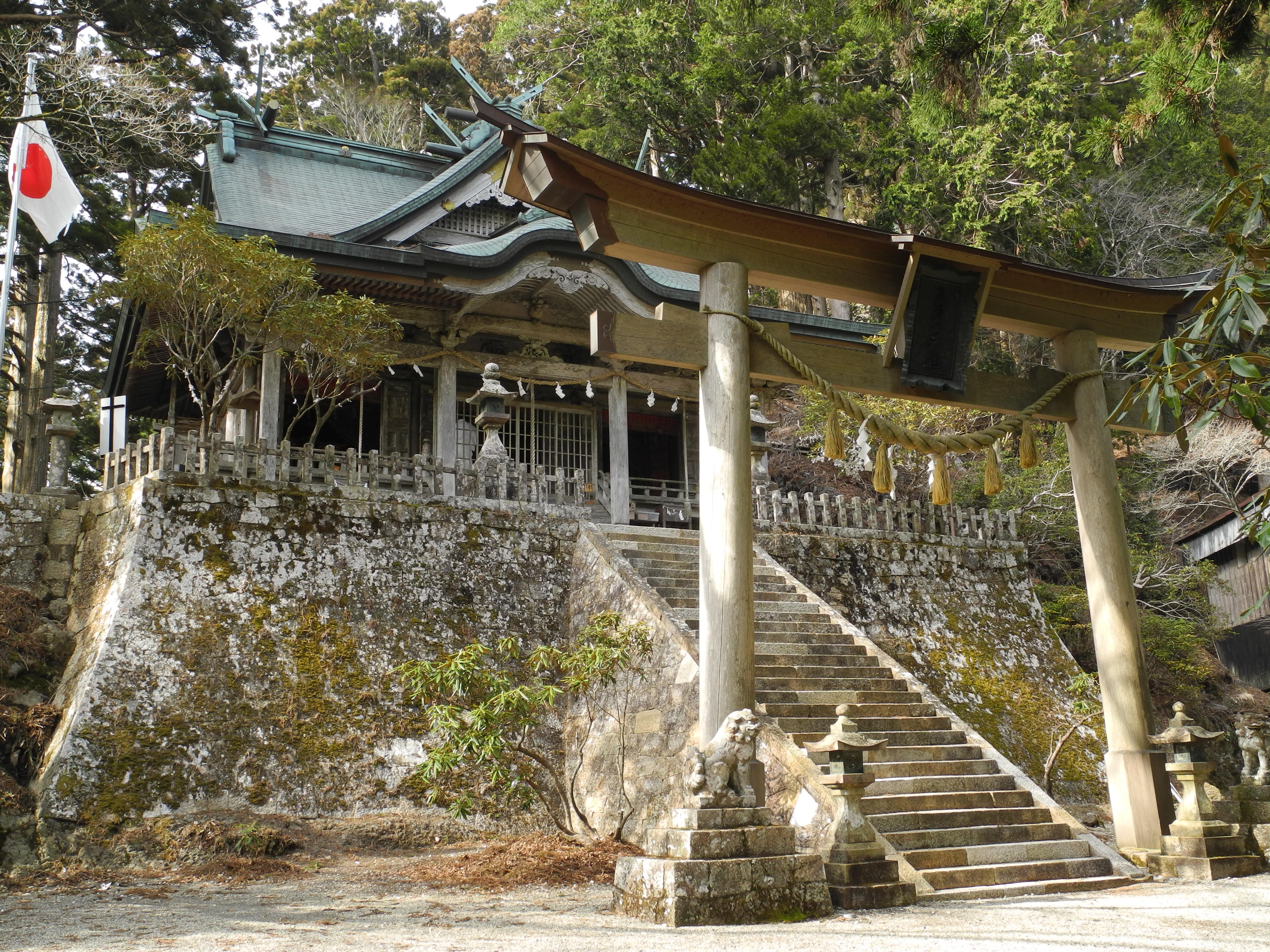
Tamaki-jinja

Tamaki Shrine (玉置神社, tamaki jinja) is a Shinto shrine located at the top of Mt. Tamaki (玉置山, tamaki san). It was built by Emperor Sujin in 37 BC and is surrounded by several large cedar trees. Tamaki Shrine is registered as a landmark with the UNESCO World Heritage Center as one of the "Sacred Sites and Pilgrimage Routes in the Kii Mountain Range."

=== Totsukawa Onsen ===
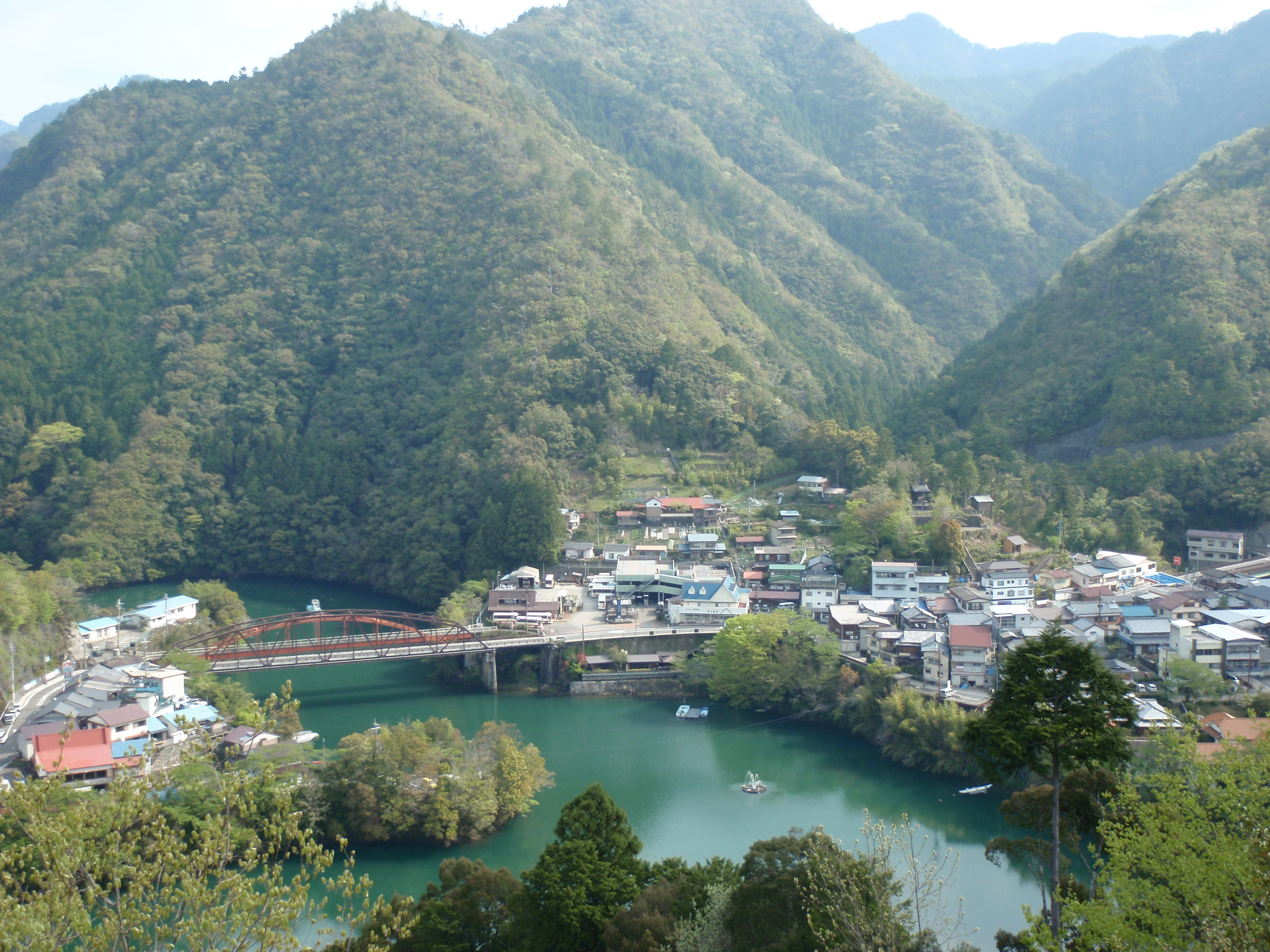
Totsukawa Onsen

Totsukawa Onsen (十津川温泉) is an onsen hot spring located in the middle of Totsukawa village. Around the hot spring, there are multiple bathhouses, also known colloquially as onsen, which utilize the hot spring. Tosenji Onsen (湯泉地温泉) is the oldest bathhouse in the village, dating back to 1581. The bathhouses pipe the water from the hot spring into their facilities without recycling, heating or prior treatment.

=== Hatenashi mountain range ===
Hatenashi mountain range (果無山脈, hatenashi sanmyaku) is about 1,200 m (3,900 ft) in height. This mountain range is located on the boundary between Nara and Wakayama Prefecture and stretches about 30 km (19 mi). The place where Hatenashi mountain range meets Kohechi at Kumano-Kodo route is called Hatenashi pass. This pass is 1,070 m (3,510 ft) high. The Kumano-Kodo pilgrimage routes are designated as a World Heritage Site.
