= Nishiyoshino, Nara =

Dissolved municipality in Nara prefecture, Japan

Nishiyoshino (西吉野村, Nishiyoshino-mura) was a village located in Yoshino District, Nara Prefecture, Japan.

As of 2003, the village had an estimated population of 3,673 and a density of 39.98 persons per km^{2}. The total area was 91.88 km^{2}.

On September 25, 2005, Nishiyoshino, along with the village of Ōtō (also from Yoshino District), was merged into the expanded city of Gojō.

During the Northern and Southern Courts period of Japanese history (1336 to 1392), three emperors of the Southern Court - Emperor Go-Daigo, Emperor Go-Murakami, and Emperor Go-Kameyama are believed to have stayed in the Imperial Villa in the Anō area of Nishiyoshino.

Nishiyoshino is well known in Japan for its persimmon.
