= Shimokitayama, Nara =

Shimokitayama 下北山村
- Village
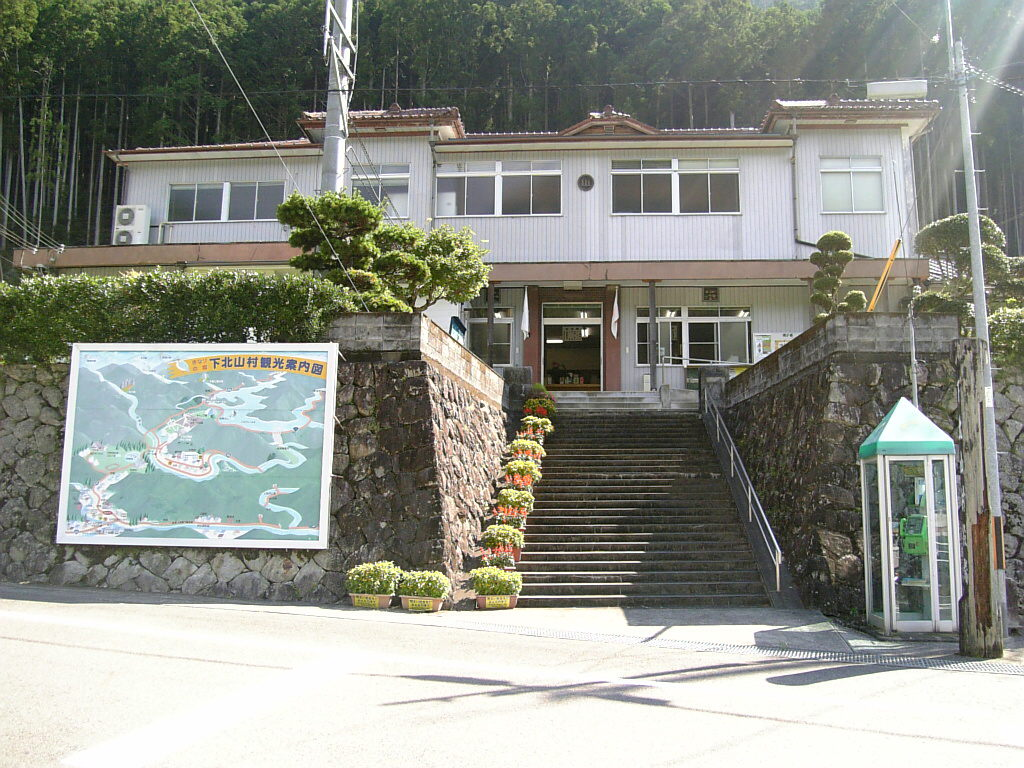
- Shimokitayama Village Office

- Flag Emblem
- Location of Shimokitayama in Nara Prefecture

- Location in Japan
- Coordinates: 34°0′18″N 135°57′15″E
- Country: Japan
- Region: Kansai
- Prefecture: Nara
- District: Yoshino

Area
  - Total: 133.39 km^{2} (51.50 sq mi)

Population (January 1, 2025)
  - Total: 678
  - Density: 5.08/km^{2} (13.2/sq mi)
- Time zone: UTC+09:00 (JST)
- City hall address: 1002 Teragakiuchi, Shimokitayama-mura, Yoshino-gun, Nara-ken 639-3803
- Website: Official website
- Symbols
- Bird: Common kingfisher
- Flower: Azalea
- Tree: Aesculus turbinata (Japanese horse-chestnut)

Fudonanae Falls

Shimokitayama (下北山村, Shimokitayama-mura) is a village located in Yoshino District, Nara Prefecture, Japan. As of 1 January 2025, the village had an estimated population of 678 and a population density of 5.1 persons per km^{2}. The total area of the village is 131.65 km^{2} (50.83 sq mi).

== Geography ==
Bordering on Kamikitayama to the north and Totsukawa to the west, it is the southeasternmost region in Nara Prefecture. It shares a border to the east with Kumano, Mie Prefecture, and to the south, with Kitayama, Wakayama Prefecture. Much of the village is within the borders of the Yoshino-Kumano National Park and the Sacred Sites and Pilgrimage Routes in the Kii Mountain Range World Heritage Site.

Shimokitayama is composed of seven main hamlets, arranged roughly in a circle, and Zenki, which is no longer inhabited but which once housed a religious community of shugendo practitioners, including Jitsukaga.

Roads lead north toward Nara from Ikehara, east toward Kumano from Shimokuwahara, south toward Kitayama from Kamikuwahara, and west toward Totsukawa from Uramukai.

Ikehara
The main center of Shimokitayama's main industry, tourism, Ikehara is home to Kinari no Sato, a resort containing an onsen known as Kinari no Yu, various fishing and camping shops, gas stations, a few cafes and izakaya, and a small karaoke bar. It also contains Fumonji, a temple of the Sōtō sect of Zen Buddhism, and Shimokitayama Junior High School.
Ikemine
Ikemine is home to the Ike no Taira nine-hole golf course, the Myōjin Ike Pond Shrine and a Tenrikyō temple.
Kamikuwahara
Kamikuwahara is almost entirely residential.
Sada
Sada is home to a gas station and a Tenrikyō temple.
Shimokuwahara
Shimokuwahara contains Shimokitayama Preschool and Ryūganji a temple of the Sōtō sect of Zen Buddhism.
Teragaito
Teragaito contains Shimokitayama's village hall, Sumiyoshi Shrine, and Shimokitayama Elementary School. It is also home to Shōbōji, a temple of the Sōtō sect of Zen Buddhism at which local shugenja Jitsukaga Gyōja is enshrined.
Uramukai
Uramukai includes the drainage area known as Okuji, a series of waterfalls and mountain streams sacred to shugenja, who keep a hut high in the mountains for training purposes.
Zenki
Zenki is a wild and mountainous region which contains several large waterfalls sacred to shugenja, including the famous Fudonanae Falls.

=== Climate ===
Shimokitayama has a humid subtropical climate (Köppen Cfa) characterized by warm summers and cool winters with light to no snowfall. The average annual temperature in Shimokitayama is 11.9 °C. The average annual rainfall is 1893 mm with September as the wettest month. The temperatures are highest on average in August, at around 23.5 °C, and lowest in January, at around 0.3 °C.

=== Demographics ===
Historical population
Year	Pop.	±%
1940	3,228	—
1950	3,231	+0.1%
1960	4,029	+24.7%
1970	2,360	−41.4%
1980	1,800	−23.7%
1990	1,514	−15.9%
2000	1,292	−14.7%
2010	1,039	−19.6%
2020	753	−27.5%

== History ==
The area of Shimokitayama was part of ancient Kii Province. The village Shimokitayama was established on April 1, 1889, with the creation of the modern municipalities system.

== Government ==
Shimokitayama has a mayor-council form of government with a directly elected mayor and a unicameral village council of six members. Shimokitayama, collectively with the other municipalities of Yoshino District, contributes two members to the Nara Prefectural Assembly. In terms of national politics, the village is part of the Nara 3rd district of the lower house of the Diet of Japan.

== Economy ==
Located in the mountainous area in the southern part of the prefecture, transportation is inconvenient and economic activity is not thriving. Local businesses are mainly in the tourism industry, such as hot springs and golf courses, and forestry

== Education ==
Shimokitayama has one public combined elementary/junior high school operated by the village government. The village does not have a high school.

== Transportation ==
=== Railways ===
Shimokitayama has no passenger railway service. The nearest train station is Owase Station on the JR Central Kisei Main Line in Owase.

=== Highways ===
- National Route 169
- National Route 425

== Local attractions ==
- Yoshino-Kumano National Park
- Ikehara Dam
- Fudonanae Falls
