= Yoshino District, Nara =

District of Nara, Nara Prefecture, Japan

Coordinates: 34.137°N 135.97°E

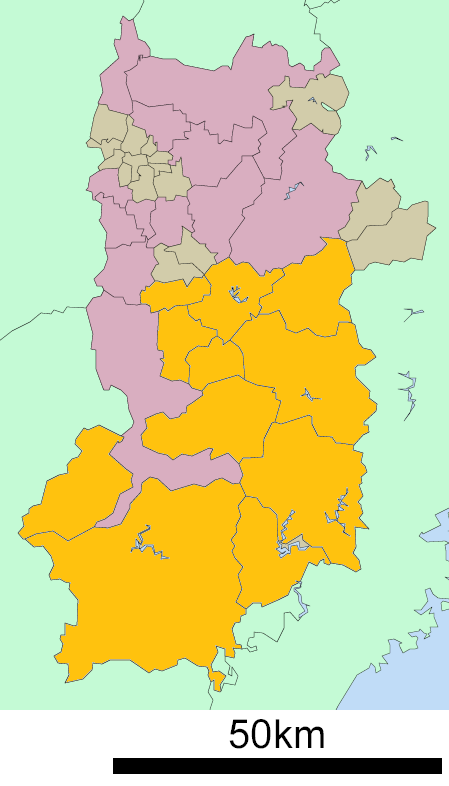
Location of Yoshino District in Nara Prefecture

Yoshino (吉野郡, Yoshino-gun) is a district located in Nara Prefecture, Japan.

In 2020, the district had an estimated population of 37,086 and a density of 18.05 persons per km^{2}. The total area is 2,055 km^{2}.

On September 25, 2005, the villages of Ōtō and Nishiyoshino merged into the city of Gojō.

== Towns and villages ==
- Higashiyoshino
- Kamikitayama
- Kawakami
- Kurotaki
- Nosegawa
- Ōyodo
- Shimoichi
- Shimokitayama
- Tenkawa
- Totsukawa
- Yoshino
