= Gojō, Nara =

Gojō 五條市
- City
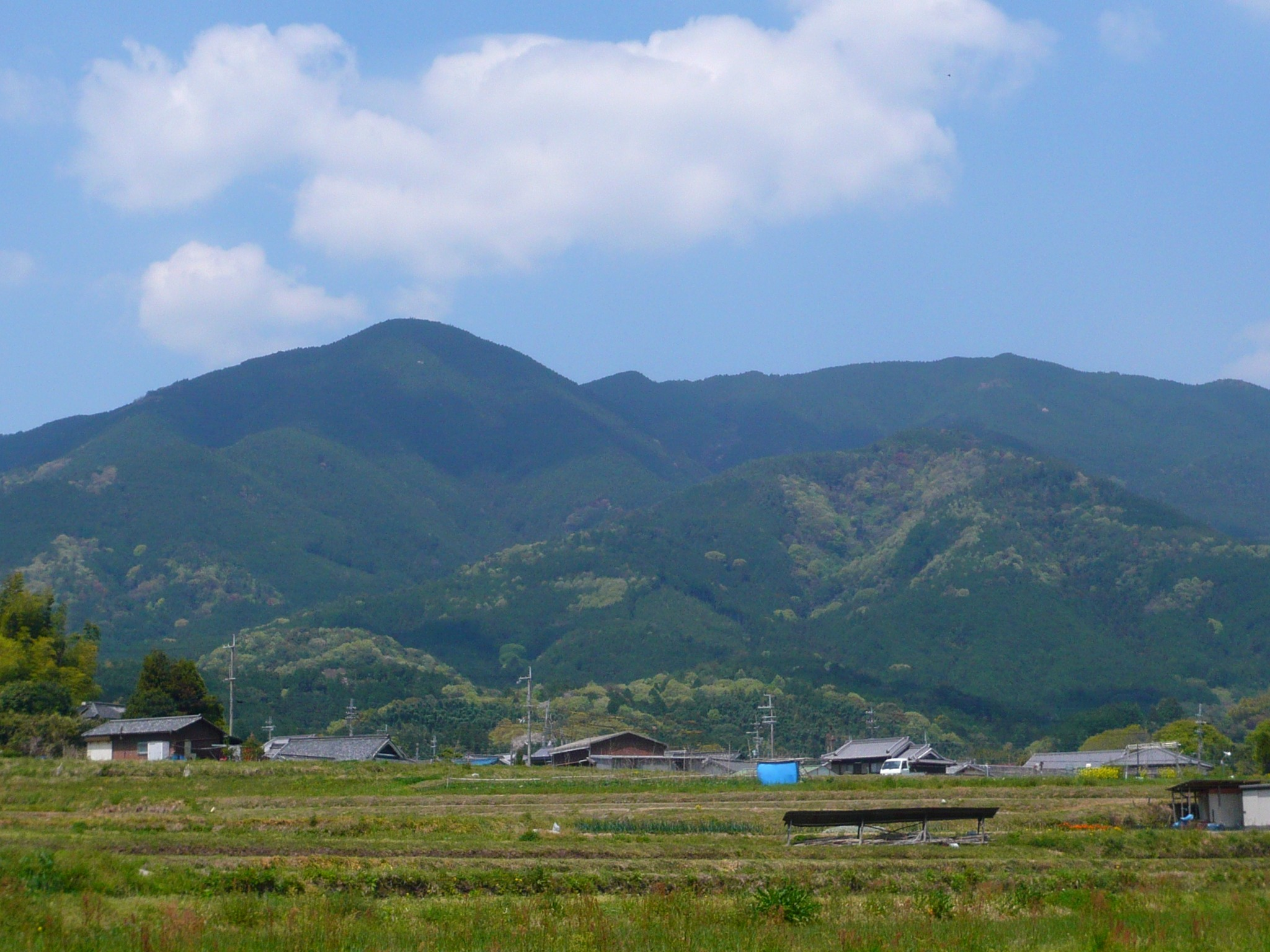

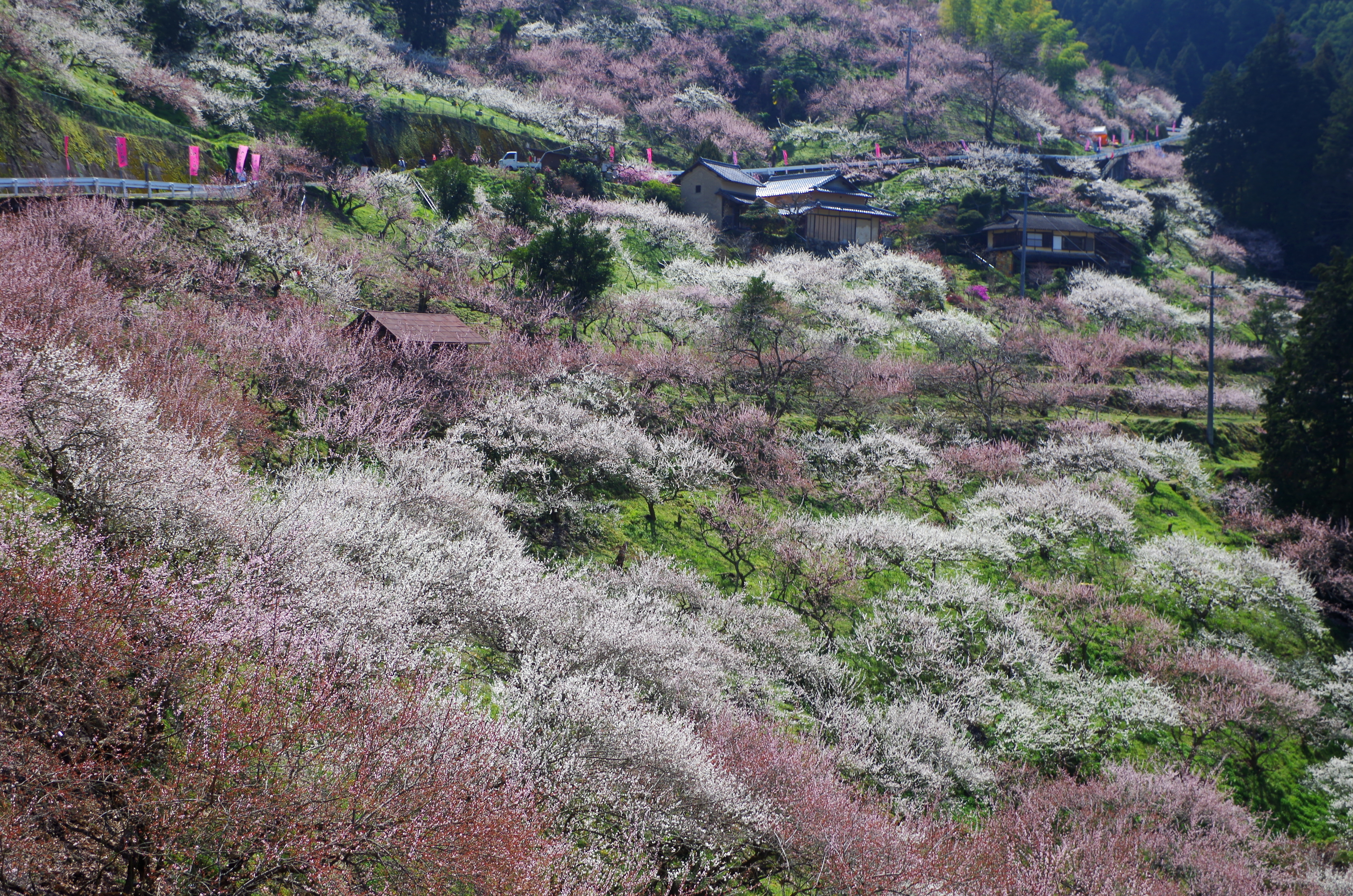

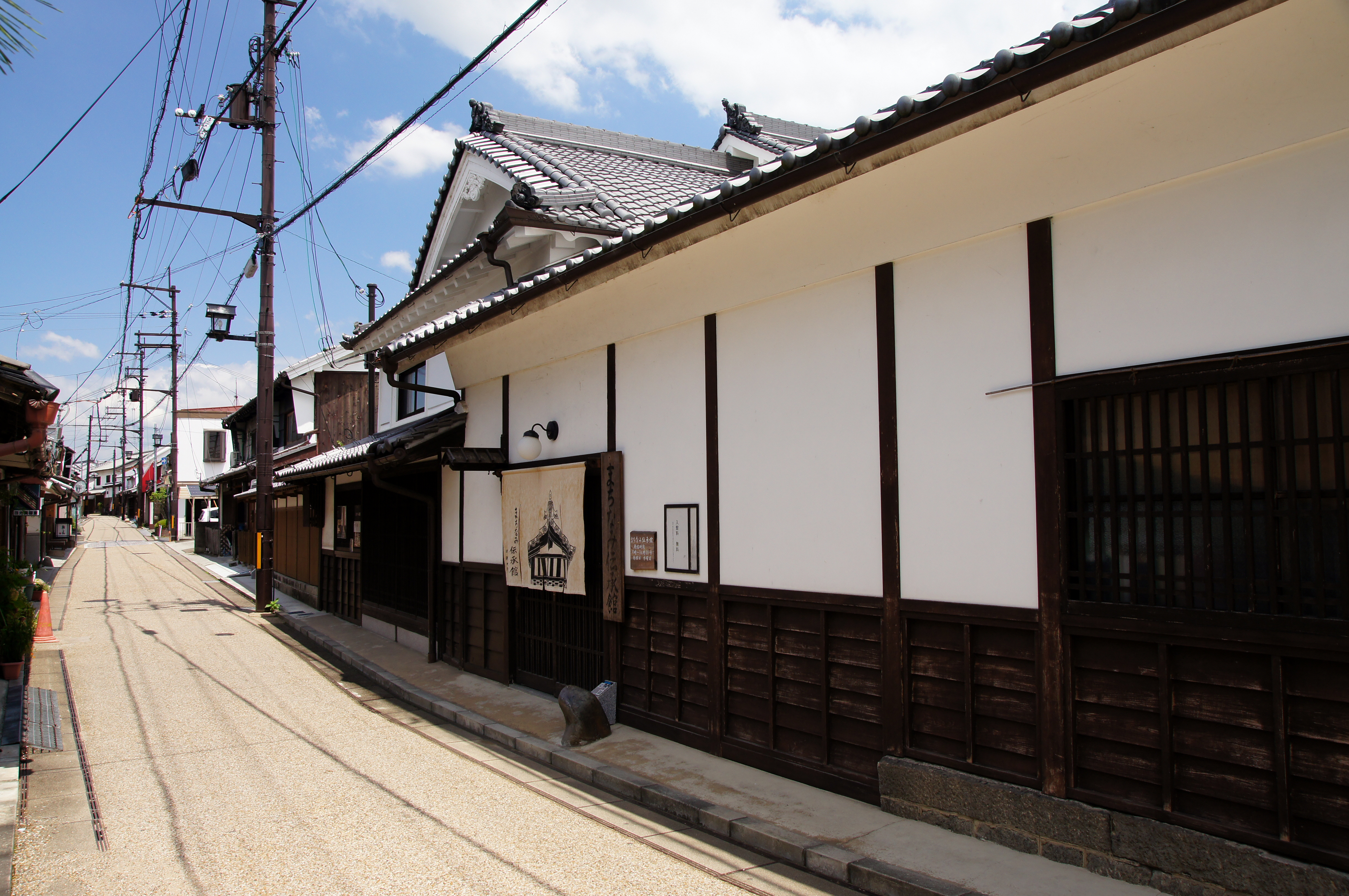

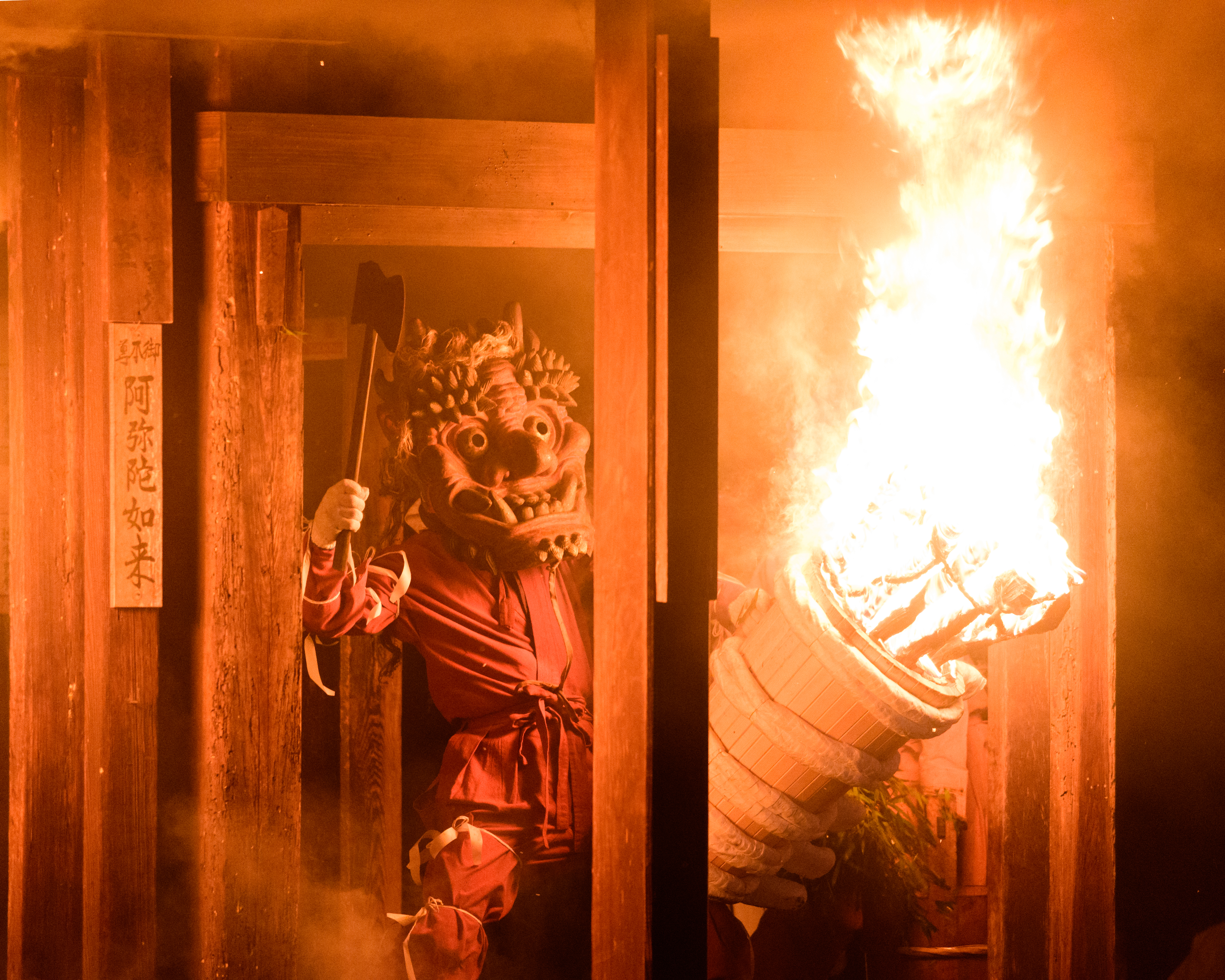

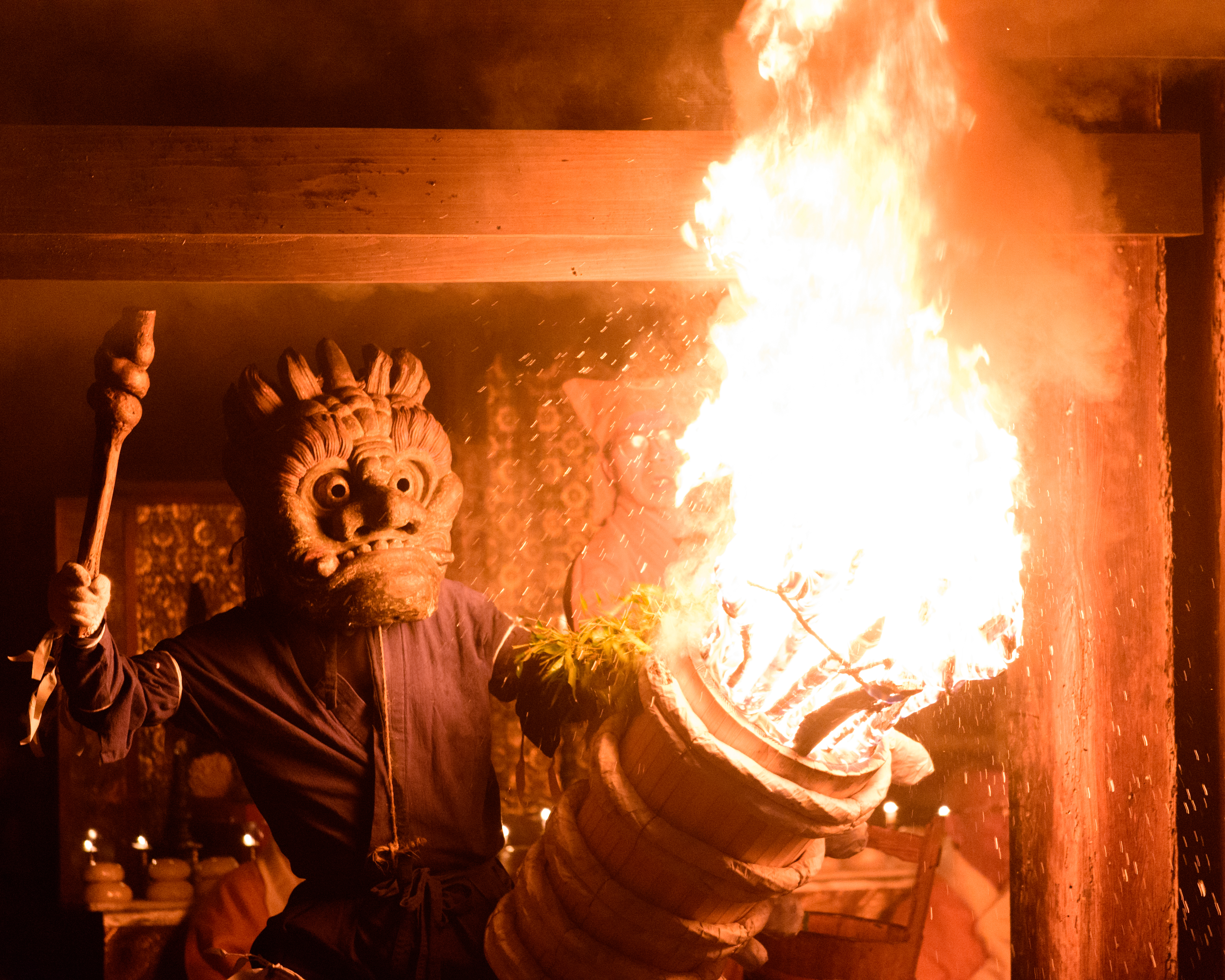

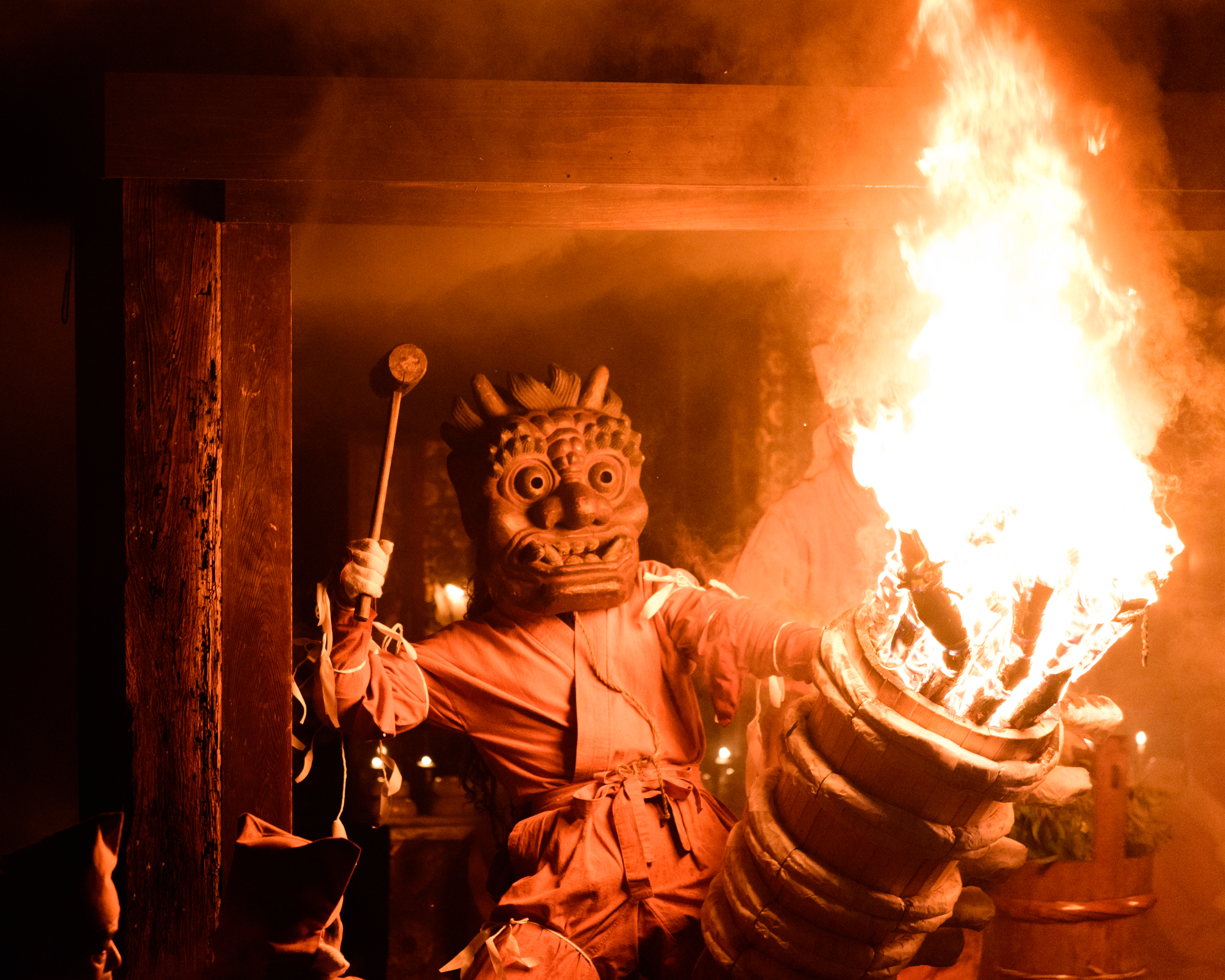
Mount Kongō	Yoshino River
Ano Plum Forest	Gojō Shinmachi
Tadado-no-oni-hashiri]
- Flag Emblem
- Interactive map of Gojō
- Location in Japan
- Coordinates: 34°21′23″N 135°41′44″E
- Country: Japan
- Region: Kansai
- Prefecture: Nara

Government
  - Mayor: Kiyoshi Hiraoka

Area
  - Total: 292.02 km^{2} (112.75 sq mi)

Population (November 30, 2024)
  - Total: 26,998
  - Density: 92.453/km^{2} (239.45/sq mi)
- Time zone: UTC+09:00 (JST)
- City hall address: 1-1-1 Honmachi, Gojō-shi, Nara-ken 637-8501
- Climate: Cfa
- Website: Official website
- Symbols
- Flower: Chinese bellflower
- Tree: Camphor laurel

Gojō (五條市, Gojō-shi) is a city located in Nara Prefecture, Japan. As of 30 November 2024, the city had an estimated population of 26,998 in 13363 households, and a population density of 92 persons per km^{2}. The total area of the city is 292.02 km^{2} (112.75 sq mi).

== Geography ==
Located in western Nara Prefecture, the Yoshino River flows west through the city. It is surrounded mostly by mountains, although the city hall is located in a flat basin. Situated north of the city hall is Mount Kongō, at 1,125 meters. Persimmon is a major fruit crop in Gojō.

=== Neighboring municipalities ===
Nara Prefecture

- Gose
- Kamikitayama
- Kurotaki
- Nosegawa
- Ōyodo
- Shimoichi
- Tenkawa
- Totsukawa

Osaka Prefecture

- Chihayaakasaka
- Kawachinagano

Wakayama Prefecture

- Hashimoto
- Kōya

=== Climate ===
Gojō has a humid subtropical climate (Köppen climate classification Cfa) with hot summers and cool to cold winters. Precipitation is significantly higher in summer than in winter, though on the whole lower than most parts of Honshū, and there is no significant snowfall. The average annual temperature in Gojō is 14.5 °C (58.1 °F). The average annual rainfall is 1,453.5 mm (57.22 in) with July as the wettest month. The temperatures are highest on average in August, at around 26.5 °C (79.7 °F), and lowest in January, at around 3.3 °C (37.9 °F). The highest temperature ever recorded in Gojō was 38.1 °C (100.6 °F) on 24 July 2026; the coldest temperature ever recorded was −7.2 °C (19.0 °F) on 19 February 2012.

Climate data for Gojō (2006−2020 normals, extremes 2005−present)
Month	Jan	Feb	Mar	Apr	May	Jun	Jul	Aug	Sep	Oct	Nov	Dec	Year
Record high °C (°F)	17.8 (64.0)	21.6 (70.9)	25.9 (78.6)	29.2 (84.6)	32.6 (90.7)	35.7 (96.3)	38.1 (100.6)	37.9 (100.2)	35.7 (96.3)	32.3 (90.1)	26.8 (80.2)	26.8 (80.2)	38.1 (100.6)
Mean daily maximum °C (°F)	8.3 (46.9)	9.5 (49.1)	13.8 (56.8)	19.2 (66.6)	24.5 (76.1)	27.0 (80.6)	30.6 (87.1)	32.7 (90.9)	28.1 (82.6)	22.2 (72.0)	16.2 (61.2)	10.8 (51.4)	20.2 (68.4)
Daily mean °C (°F)	3.3 (37.9)	4.2 (39.6)	7.6 (45.7)	12.5 (54.5)	17.8 (64.0)	21.5 (70.7)	25.4 (77.7)	26.5 (79.7)	22.4 (72.3)	16.6 (61.9)	10.6 (51.1)	5.6 (42.1)	14.5 (58.1)
Mean daily minimum °C (°F)	−1.2 (29.8)	−0.7 (30.7)	1.6 (34.9)	5.9 (42.6)	11.3 (52.3)	16.8 (62.2)	21.3 (70.3)	21.7 (71.1)	17.9 (64.2)	11.8 (53.2)	5.5 (41.9)	0.9 (33.6)	9.4 (48.9)
Record low °C (°F)	−6.2 (20.8)	−7.2 (19.0)	−4.9 (23.2)	−3.3 (26.1)	0.9 (33.6)	7.5 (45.5)	15.2 (59.4)	13.8 (56.8)	9.4 (48.9)	2.3 (36.1)	−1.8 (28.8)	−5.3 (22.5)	−7.2 (19.0)
Average precipitation mm (inches)	58.4 (2.30)	79.2 (3.12)	104.7 (4.12)	96.5 (3.80)	119.2 (4.69)	177.7 (7.00)	215.1 (8.47)	126.2 (4.97)	167.4 (6.59)	171.6 (6.76)	72.9 (2.87)	64.6 (2.54)	1,453.5 (57.22)
Average precipitation days (≥ 1.0 mm)	7.9	8.5	10.3	10.3	9.0	11.9	12.8	9.1	10.5	10.3	7.9	8.9	117.4
Mean monthly sunshine hours	107.7	115.5	162.4	177.0	201.1	140.2	161.2	209.2	152.4	145.8	132.8	109.2	1,812.8
Source: Japan Meteorological Agency

=== Demographics ===
Per Japanese census data, the population of Gojō in 2020 is 27,927 people. The population has been on decline over the past quarter of a century. Gojō has been conducting censuses since 1950.

Historical population
Year	Pop.	±%
1950	45,522	—
1955	49,416	+8.6%
1960	43,489	−12.0%
1965	42,122	−3.1%
1970	41,546	−1.4%
1975	40,892	−1.6%
1980	40,089	−2.0%
1985	39,600	−1.2%
1990	39,869	+0.7%
1995	40,871	+2.5%
2000	39,928	−2.3%
2005	37,375	−6.4%
2010	34,449	−7.8%
2015	30,997	−10.0%
2020	27,927	−9.9%
Gojō population statistics

== History ==
The area of Gojō was part of ancient Yamato Province, and contains many kofun burial mounds and ancient Shinto shrine. During the Edo period, it was a castle town and part of the tenryō holdings under the direct control of the Tokugawa shogunate. During the Bakumatsu period, it was one of the sites of the Tenchūgumi incident. The town of Gojō was established on April 1, 1889 with the creation of the modern municipalities system. It was raised to city status on October 15, 1957 by merging with the town of Nohara and the villages of Makino, Kitauchi, Uchi, Sakaibe, Oata, and Minamiata. The village of Minamiuchi was annexed on January 1, 1957, and the villages of Nishiyoshino and Ōtō on September 25, 2005.

== Government ==
Gojō has a mayor-council form of government with a directly elected mayor and a unicameral city council of 12 members. Gojō contributes one member to the Nara Prefectural Assembly. In terms of national politics, the city is part of the Nara 3rd district of the lower house of the Diet of Japan.

== Economy ==
The local economy is based on agriculture, forestry and light manufacturing. In Sumikawa-cho in the northeast of the city, there are the industrial park Technopark, Naraya Gojo Wood Industrial Park, and the newly developed residential area Elbe Town Gojo and Renaissance Court, while the Gojo Kita Interchange on the Keihanawa Expressway and Iden-cho are home to the Kitauchi Industrial Park.

== Education ==
Gojō has four public elementary schools, three public junior high school and one public high school operated by the city government and one public high school operated by the Nara Prefectural Board of Education. There are also a private junior high and a private high school.

== Transportation ==
=== Railways ===
JR West – Wakayama Line

T Kitauchi - Gojō - Yamato-Futami

=== Highways ===
- Keinawa Expressway
- National Route 24
- National Route 168
- National Route 309
- National Route 310
- National Route 370

== Local attractions ==
- Gojō Shinmachi old town
- Uchi River Rock Carvings, National Historic Site

== Notable people from Gojō ==
- Ryotaro Tanose, politician
- Machiko Ono, actress
- Kazuma Okamoto, professional baseball player
