= Ōtō, Nara =

Ōtō 大塔村
- Village
- Interactive map of Ōtō
- Country: Japan
- Prefecture: Nara
- District: Yoshino
- Merged: September 25, 2005 (now part of Gojō)

Area
  - Total: 111.06 km^{2} (42.88 sq mi)

Population (2003)
  - Total: 781
  - Density: 7.03/km^{2} (18.2/sq mi)
- Time zone: UTC+09:00 (JST)

Ōtō (大塔村, Ōtō-mura) was a village located in Yoshino District, Nara Prefecture, Japan.

As of 2003, the village had an estimated population of 781 and a density of 7.03 persons per km^{2}. The total area was 111.06 km^{2}.

On September 25, 2005, Ōtō, along with the village of Nishiyoshino (also from Yoshino District), was merged into the expanded city of Gojō.
