= Kii Mountains =

Mountains in Japan

Highest point
- Peak: Mount Hakkyō, Nara Prefecture, Japan
- Elevation: 1,914.6 m (6,281 ft)
- Coordinates: 34°10′25″N 135°54′27″E

Naming
- Native name: 紀伊山地 (Japanese); Kii Sanchi (Japanese)

Geography
- Country: Japan
- States: Mie Prefecture, Nara Prefecture and Wakayama Prefecture
- Region: Kansai region
- Subdivisions: Daikō Mountains, Obako Mountains and Ōmine Mountains

Geology
- Orogeny: island arc

Kii Mountains (紀伊山地, Kii Sanchi) is a mountainous region covering most of the Kii Peninsula. They lie south of the Japan Median Tectonic Line (MTL) in Wakayama, Nara, and Mie prefectures. The mountains are arranged roughly northeast to southwest.

== History ==
During the Heian period, Shugendō flourished in these mountains. In 2004 it became part of a UNESCO World Cultural and Natural Heritage site, under the name "Sacred Sites and Pilgrimage Routes in the Kii Mountain Range"

In the Northern regions of the mountains, Yoshino and Omine have the oldest sacred traditions where followers of Shugendo, have been practising their faith within the forests since the seventh century. Kumano Sanzan is in the Southern area of the ranges and has three significant Buddhist shrines devoted to nature worship. Around Koyasan, 117 temples represent over one thousand years of worship and are linked by networks of pilgrim routes through the steep peaks and glades of the Kii mountains.

== Geography ==
The highest peak is Mount Hakkyō 1,914.6 metres (6,281 ft) in the Ōmine Mountains. Other peaks in the central group are Mount Shakka(1800m) and Mount Sanjō (1719m). To the East in the Daikō Mountains is Mount Ōdaigahara (1695m). In the South is Mount Daitō 大塔山(1122m). The Obako Mountains separate Nara Prefecture from Wakayama Prefecture.

Yoshino-Kumano National Park is located in the Kii Mountains.

== Geology ==
Along with the Shikoku Mountains, the Kii Mountains form the outer arc of the Southwestern Japan Arc. The mountains are mostly domed upthrusts of sedimentary rock from the Cretaceous and Lower Miocene.
