= Kamikitayama =

Kamikitayama 上北山村
- Village
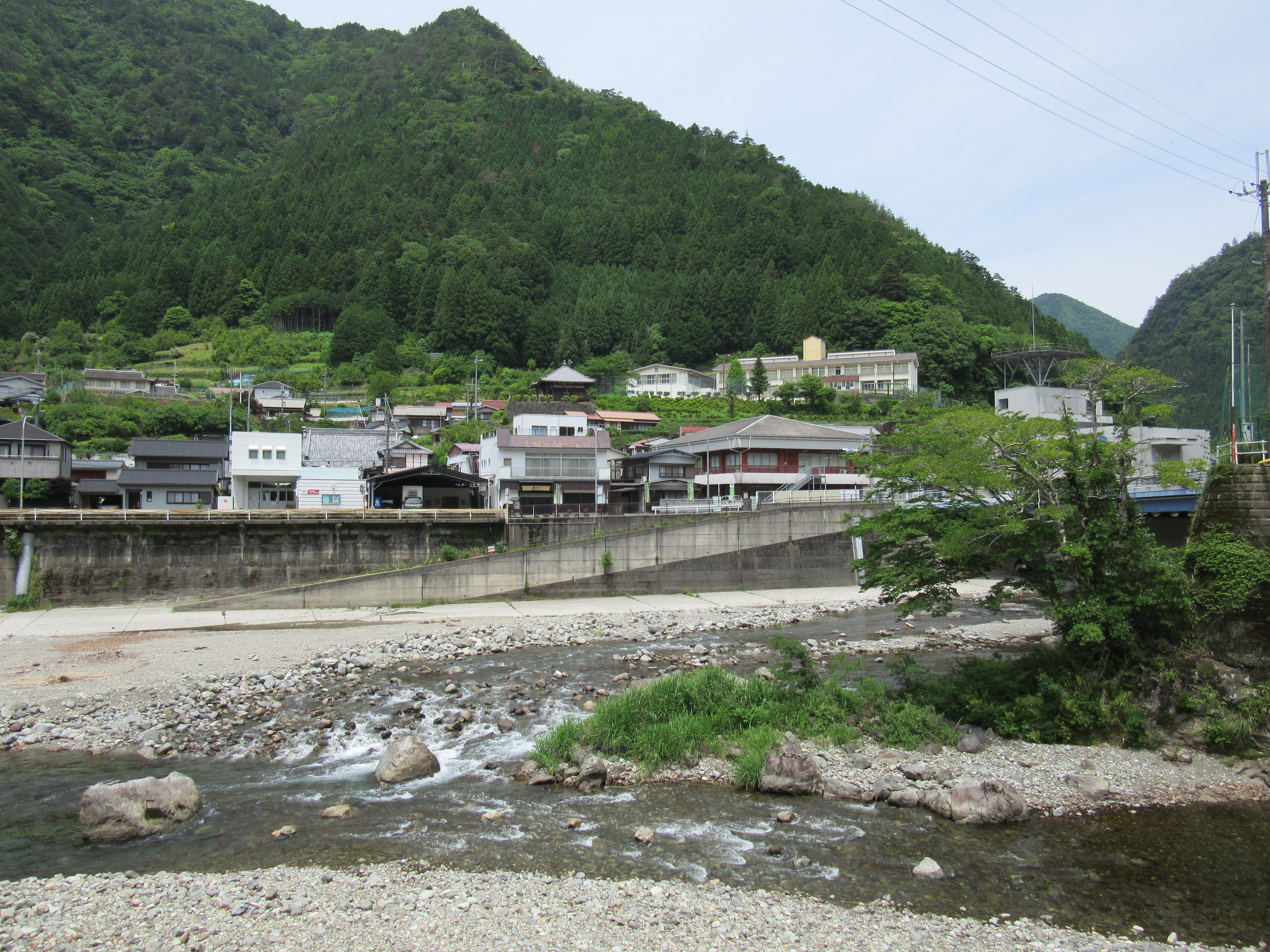
- Kamikitayama Village

- Flag Chapter
- Interactive map of Kamikitayama
- Location in Japan
- Coordinates: 34°8′3″N 136°0′0″E
- Country: Japan
- Region: Kansai
- Prefecture: Nara Prefecture
- District: Yoshino

Area
  - Total: 274.22 km^{2} (105.88 sq mi)

Population (January 1, 2025)
  - Total: 380
  - Density: 1.4/km^{2} (3.6/sq mi)
- Time zone: UTC+09:00 (JST)
- City hall address: 330 Kawai, Kamikitayama-mura, Nara-ken 639-3701
- Climate: Cfa
- Website: vill.kamikitayama.nara.jp
- Symbols
- Bird: Lesser cuckoo (Cuculus poliocephalus)
- Flower: Lilium auratum (mountain lily)
- Tree: Zelkova serrata (Japanese elm)

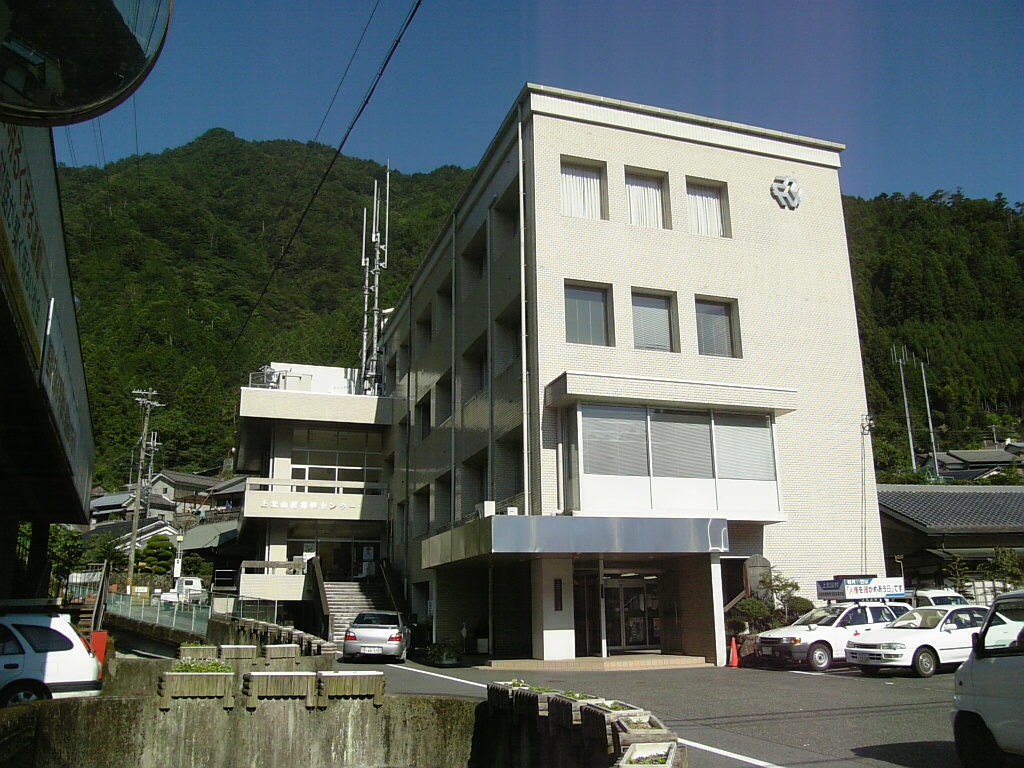
Kitakamiyama Village Hall

Kamikitayama (上北山村, Kamikitayama-mura) is a village located in Yoshino District, Nara Prefecture, Japan. As of 1 January 2025, the village had an estimated population of 380 and a population density of 1.4 persons per km^{2}. The total area of the village is 274.22 km^{2} (105.88 sq mi).

== Geography ==
Kitakamiyama is located in the mountainous area in the southern part of Yoshino County. It is a mountain village rich in nature, with the ridge of the Omine Mountains to the west and the Daidaka Mountains and Odaigahara to the east. Wasamatayama Ski Resort, one of two ski resorts in the prefecture, is located in the north. There are many narrow roads, and it is not easy to access the village by any route other than National Route 169. Approximately 97% of the village's area is covered by forest.

=== Climate ===
Kamikitayama has a humid subtropical climate (Köppen climate classification Cfa) with hot summers and cool to cold winters. Precipitation is significantly higher in summer than in winter, though on the whole lower than most parts of Honshū. There is no significant snowfall. The average annual temperature in Kamikitayama is 13.5 °C (56.3 °F). The average annual rainfall is 2,909.3 mm (114.54 in) with September the wettest month. The temperatures are highest on average in August, at around 24.6 °C (76.3 °F), and lowest in January, at around 2.9 °C (37.2 °F). The highest temperature ever recorded in Kamikitayama was 39.6 °C (103.3 °F) on 25 July 2026; the coldest temperature ever recorded was −9.3 °C (15.3 °F) on 28 February 1981.

Climate data for Kamikitayama (1991−2020 normals, extremes 1978−present)
Month	Jan	Feb	Mar	Apr	May	Jun	Jul	Aug	Sep	Oct	Nov	Dec	Year
Record high °C (°F)	17.6 (63.7)	21.9 (71.4)	26.7 (80.1)	31.1 (88.0)	34.2 (93.6)	37.0 (98.6)	39.6 (103.3)	39.3 (102.7)	37.1 (98.8)	29.7 (85.5)	24.2 (75.6)	21.6 (70.9)	39.6 (103.3)
Mean daily maximum °C (°F)	8.1 (46.6)	9.6 (49.3)	13.6 (56.5)	19.2 (66.6)	23.6 (74.5)	25.9 (78.6)	30.0 (86.0)	31.1 (88.0)	27.0 (80.6)	21.4 (70.5)	15.8 (60.4)	10.2 (50.4)	19.6 (67.3)
Daily mean °C (°F)	2.9 (37.2)	3.7 (38.7)	7.1 (44.8)	12.0 (53.6)	16.6 (61.9)	20.1 (68.2)	23.9 (75.0)	24.6 (76.3)	21.2 (70.2)	15.5 (59.9)	9.9 (49.8)	4.8 (40.6)	13.5 (56.4)
Mean daily minimum °C (°F)	−0.9 (30.4)	−0.7 (30.7)	1.8 (35.2)	6.2 (43.2)	11.1 (52.0)	15.9 (60.6)	20.0 (68.0)	20.6 (69.1)	17.4 (63.3)	11.5 (52.7)	5.5 (41.9)	0.8 (33.4)	9.1 (48.4)
Record low °C (°F)	−7.9 (17.8)	−9.3 (15.3)	−5.5 (22.1)	−3.8 (25.2)	0.9 (33.6)	5.3 (41.5)	12.8 (55.0)	10.9 (51.6)	6.8 (44.2)	0.0 (32.0)	−2.9 (26.8)	−6.1 (21.0)	−9.3 (15.3)
Average precipitation mm (inches)	80.7 (3.18)	104.4 (4.11)	164.2 (6.46)	175.2 (6.90)	223.4 (8.80)	316.1 (12.44)	397.1 (15.63)	450.5 (17.74)	499.7 (19.67)	277.1 (10.91)	119.9 (4.72)	87.7 (3.45)	2,909.3 (114.54)
Average precipitation days (≥ 1.0 mm)	8.0	9.0	11.5	10.5	11.5	14.5	14.0	12.8	13.3	11.9	8.4	8.0	133.4
Mean monthly sunshine hours	131.0	131.1	163.0	183.7	188.9	132.0	156.7	178.5	133.7	136.3	134.8	134.9	1,807.6
Source: Japan Meteorological Agency

=== Demographics ===
The population has been consistently declining over the last 50 years. The village has an ageing population.

Historical population
Year	Pop.	±%
1920	4,421	—
1925	3,346	−24.3%
1930	3,463	+3.5%
1935	3,865	+11.6%
1940	2,928	−24.2%
1945	2,233	−23.7%
1950	2,337	+4.7%
1955	2,543	+8.8%
1960	3,806	+49.7%
1965	2,007	−47.3%
1970	1,717	−14.4%
1975	1,463	−14.8%
1980	1,155	−21.1%
1985	1,123	−2.8%
1990	1,046	−6.9%
1995	1,023	−2.2%
2000	915	−10.6%
2005	802	−12.3%
2010	683	−14.8%
2015	512	−25.0%
2020	444	−13.3%
Kamikitayama population statistics

== History ==
The area of Kamikitayama was part of ancient Yamato Province. The village of Kitakamiyama was established on April 1, 1889, with the creation of the modern municipalities system.

== Government ==
Kamikitayama has a mayor-council form of government with a directly elected mayor and a unicameral village council of eight members. Kamikitayama, collectively with the other municipalities of Yoshino District, contributes two members to the Nara Prefectural Assembly. In terms of national politics, the village is part of the Nara 3rd district of the lower house of the Diet of Japan.

== Economy ==
The local economy is based on tourism and forestry. Due to the terrain, there is very little agriculture.

== Education ==
Kitakamiyama has one public combined elementary/junior high school operated by the village government. The village does not have a high school.

== Transportation ==
=== Railways ===
Kamikitayama has no passenger railway service. The nearest train station is Yamato-Kamiichi Station on the Kintetsu Yoshino Line in Yoshino.

=== Highways ===
- National Route 169
- National Route 309
- National Route 425
