= Mount Ōtenjō =

Mountain in the country of Japan

- 大天井ヶ岳
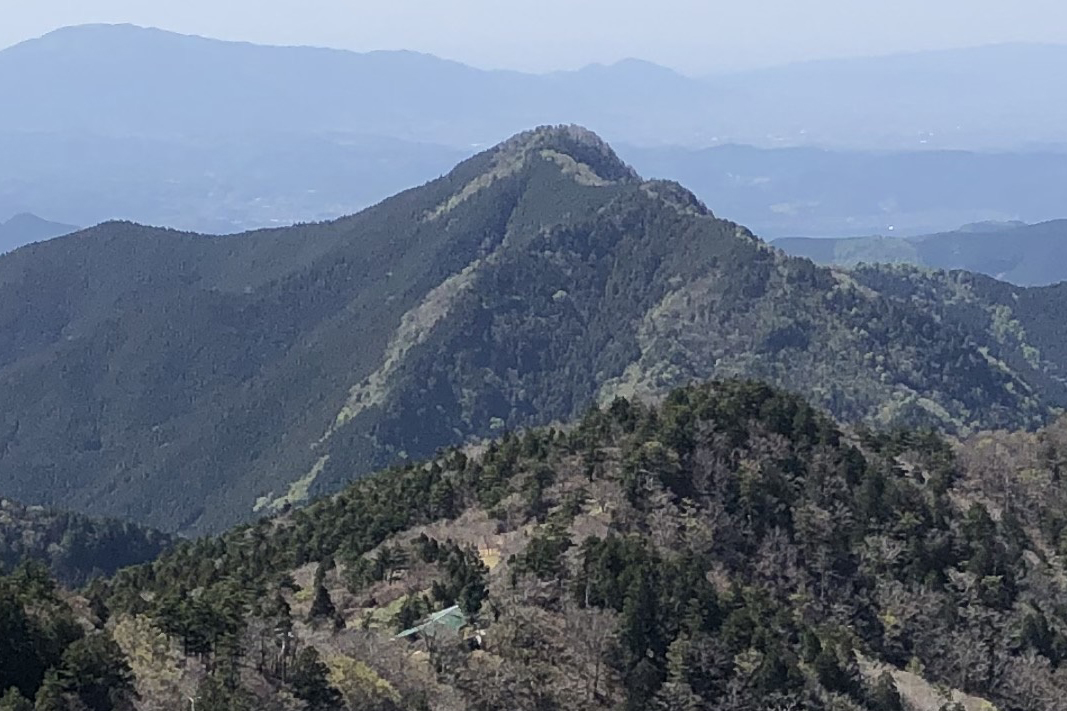
- Seen from the SE

Highest point
- Elevation: 1,438.7 m (4,720 ft)
- Listing: List of mountains and hills of Japan by height
- Coordinates: 34°14′4″N 135°54′52″E

Naming
- Language of name: Japanese
- Pronunciation: [oːtendʑoːdake]

Geography
- Location within Japan
- Location: Kurotaki and Kawakami, Nara, Japan
- Parent range: Ōmine Mountain Range

Mount Ōtenjō (大天井ヶ岳, Ōtenjō-ga-dake) is a 1,438.7 m (4,720 ft) mountain of Ōmine Mountain Range, located on the border of Kurotaki and Kawakami, Nara, Japan. This mountain is one of the Kinki 100 mountains. This mountain is on the route of Ōmine Okugakemichi.

Ōtenjō literally means ‘the great ceiling’.

== Route ==
There are three major routes to the top of this mountain. The most popular route is from Dorokawa, Kurotaki via Gobanzeki and it takes three hours and 15 minutes to the top. Another route is also from Dorokawa via Mount Iwaya and it takes three hours. The other route is from north via Mount Shisuniwa from Yoshinoyama Station, but it takes seven and half hours.

== Access ==
- Dorokawa Bus Stop of Nara Kotsu
- Yoshinoyama Station of Yoshino Ohmine ke-buru Ropeway

== Gallery ==
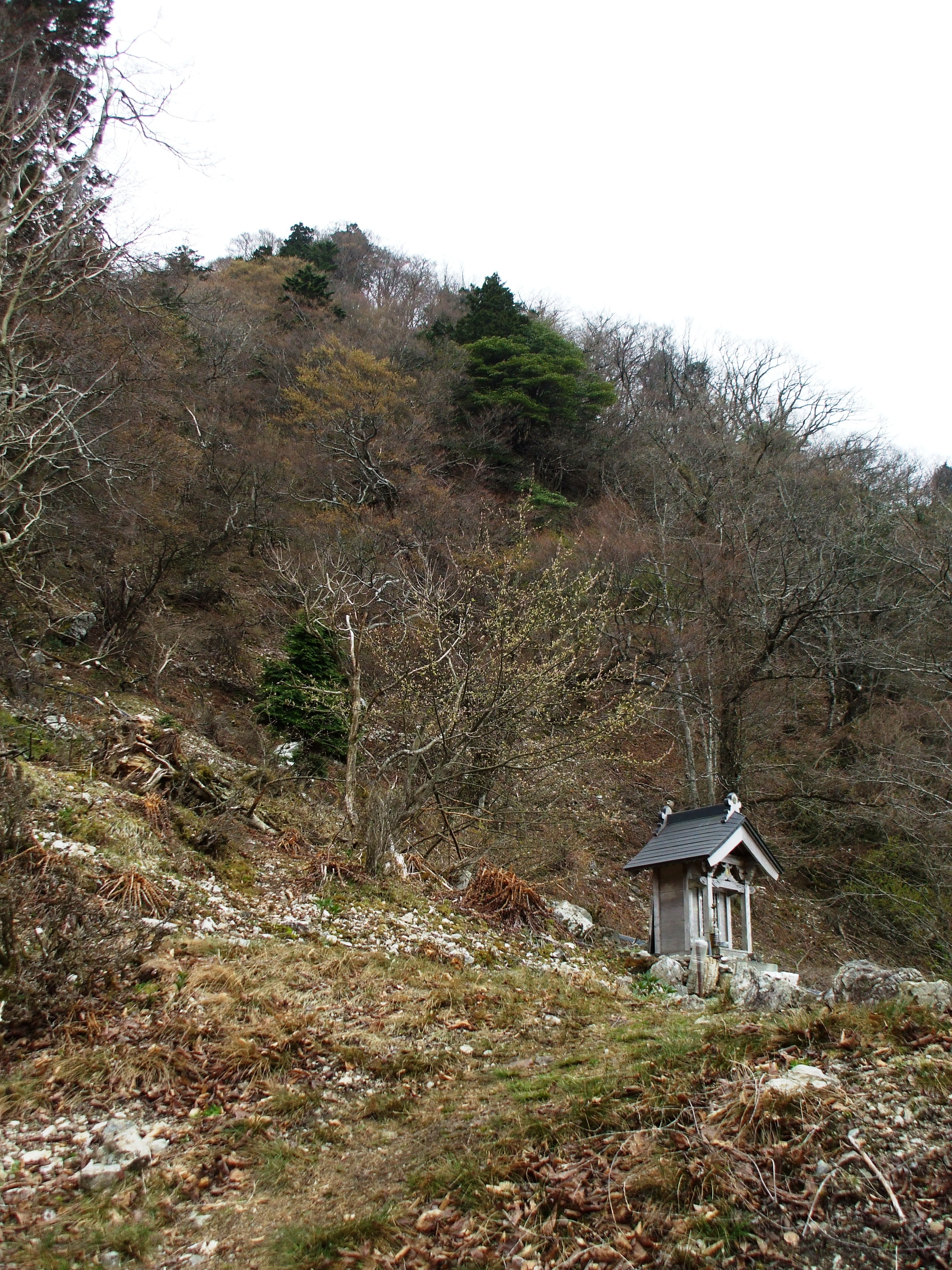
Mount Ōtenjō from north (5/2009)

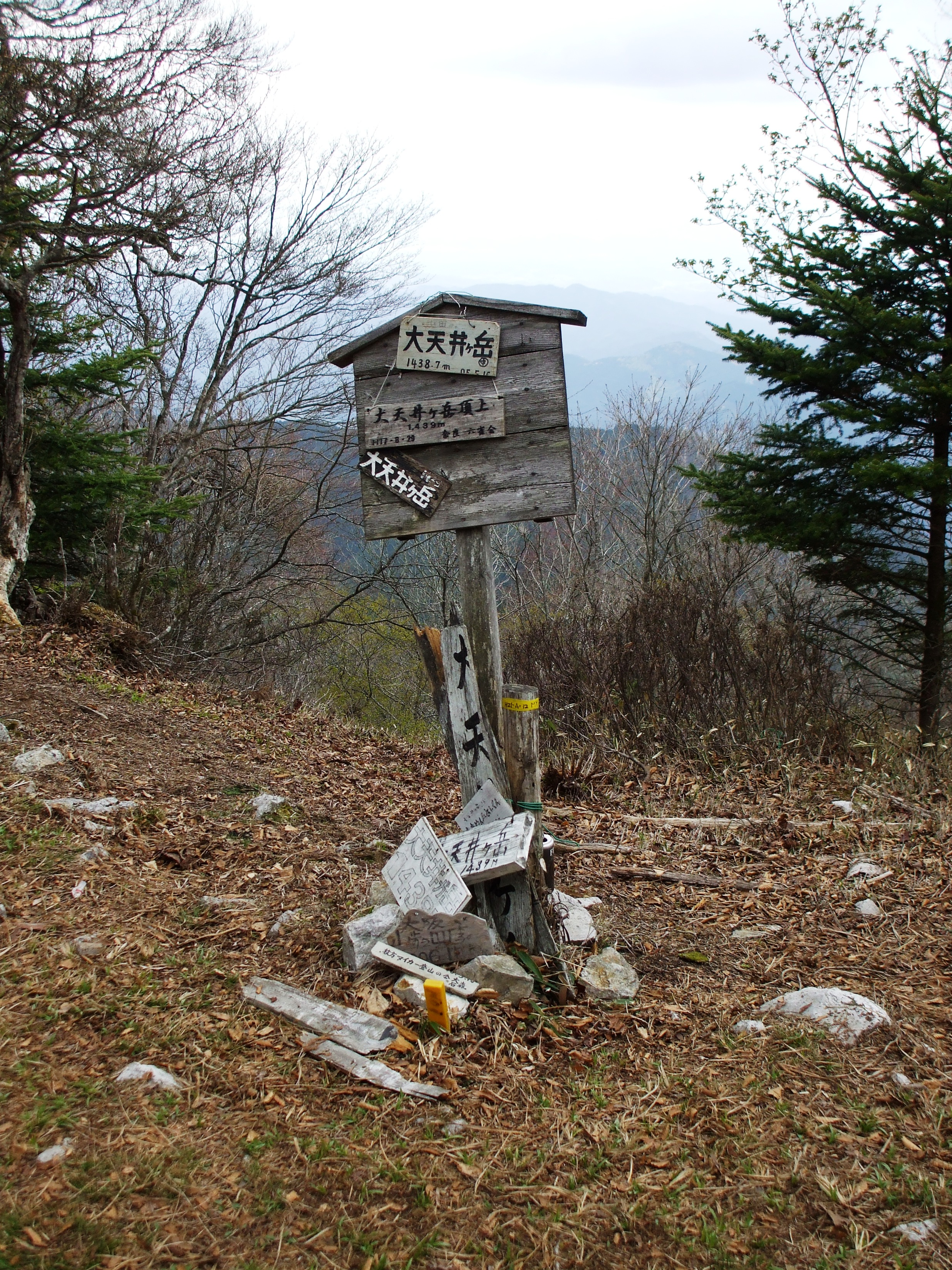
The top of Mount Ōtenjō (5/2009)

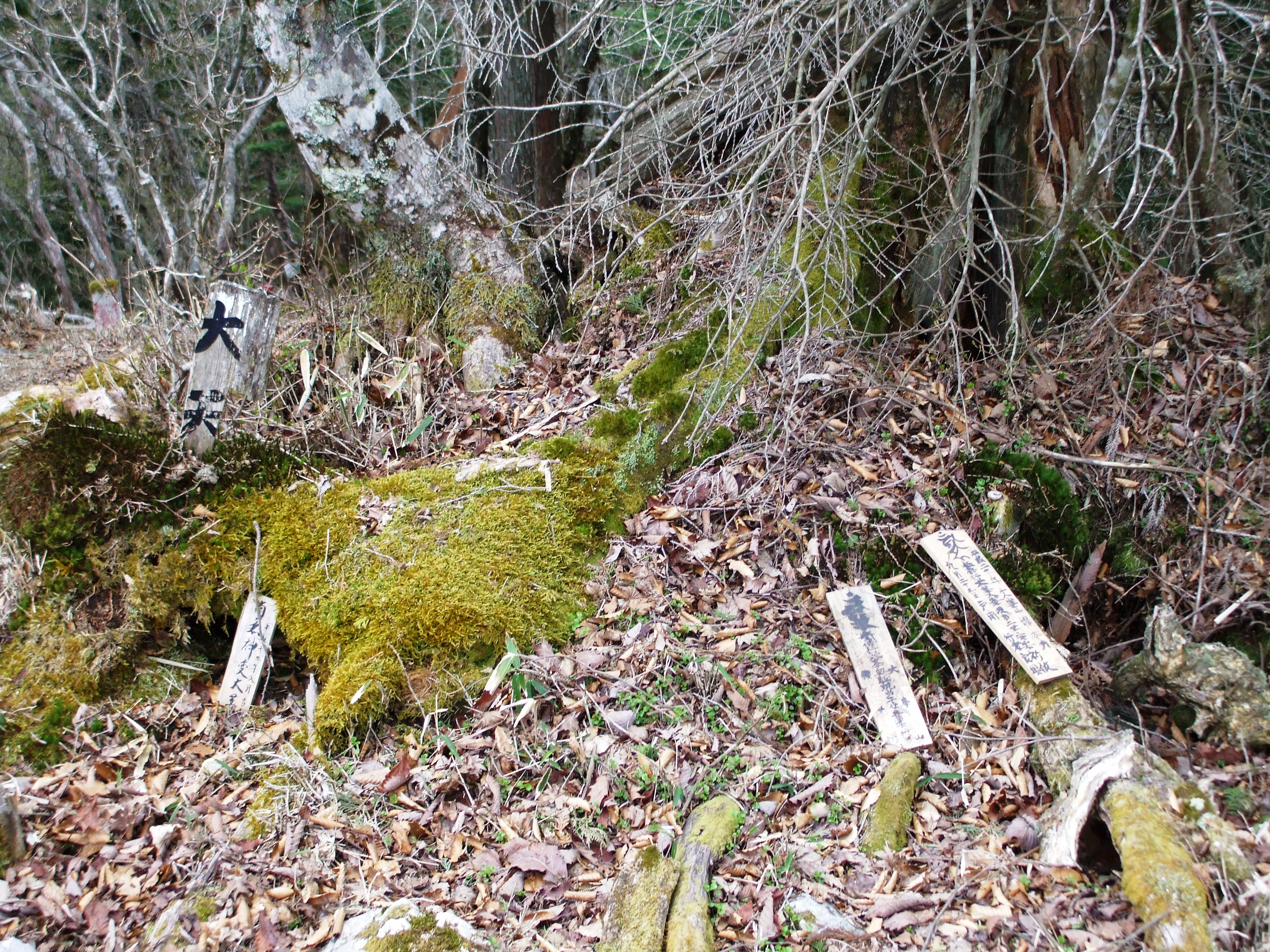
Religious objects on the top of Mount Ōtenjō (5/2009)

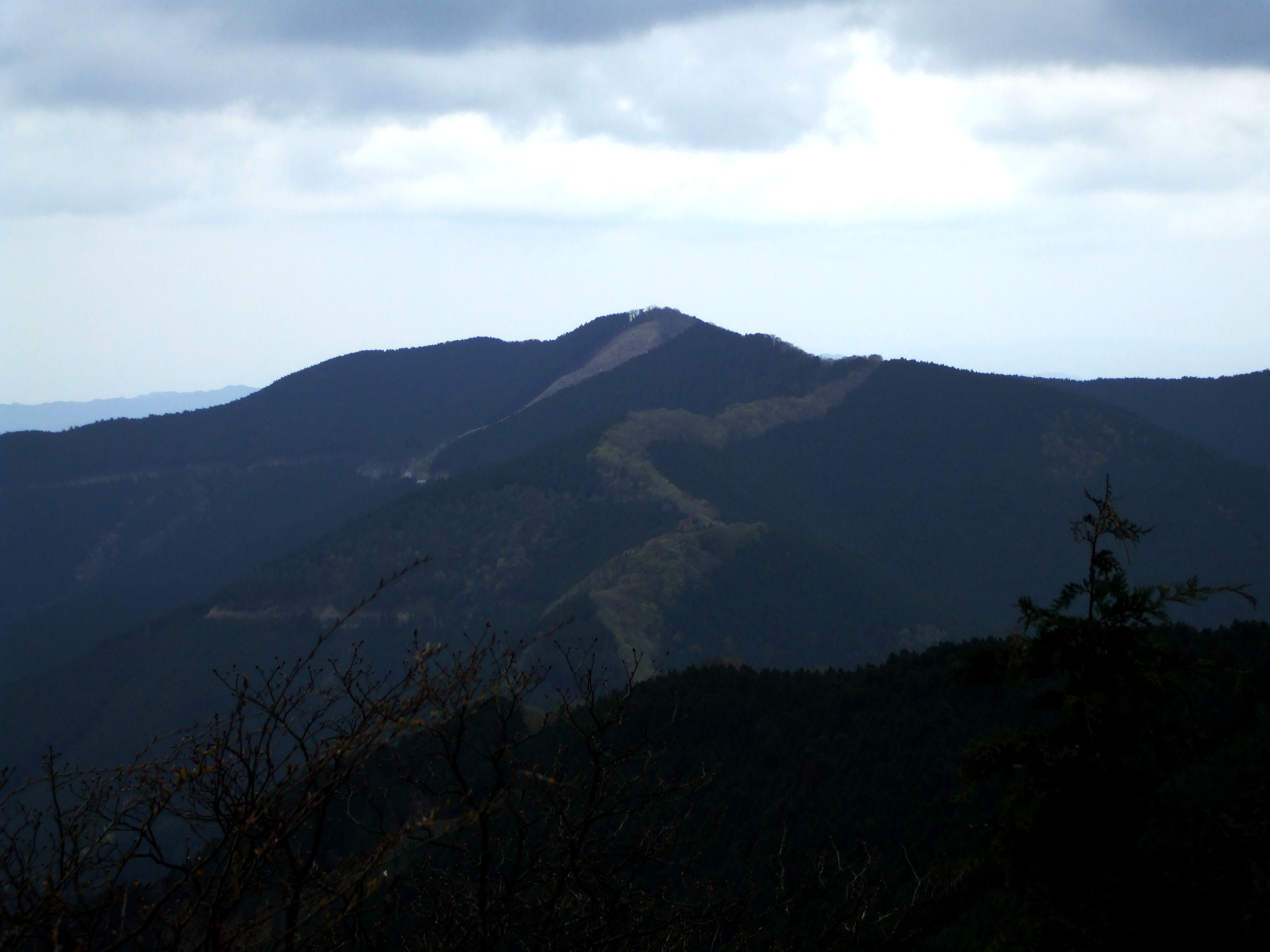
Mount Shisuniwa from the top of Mount Ōtenjō (5/2009)

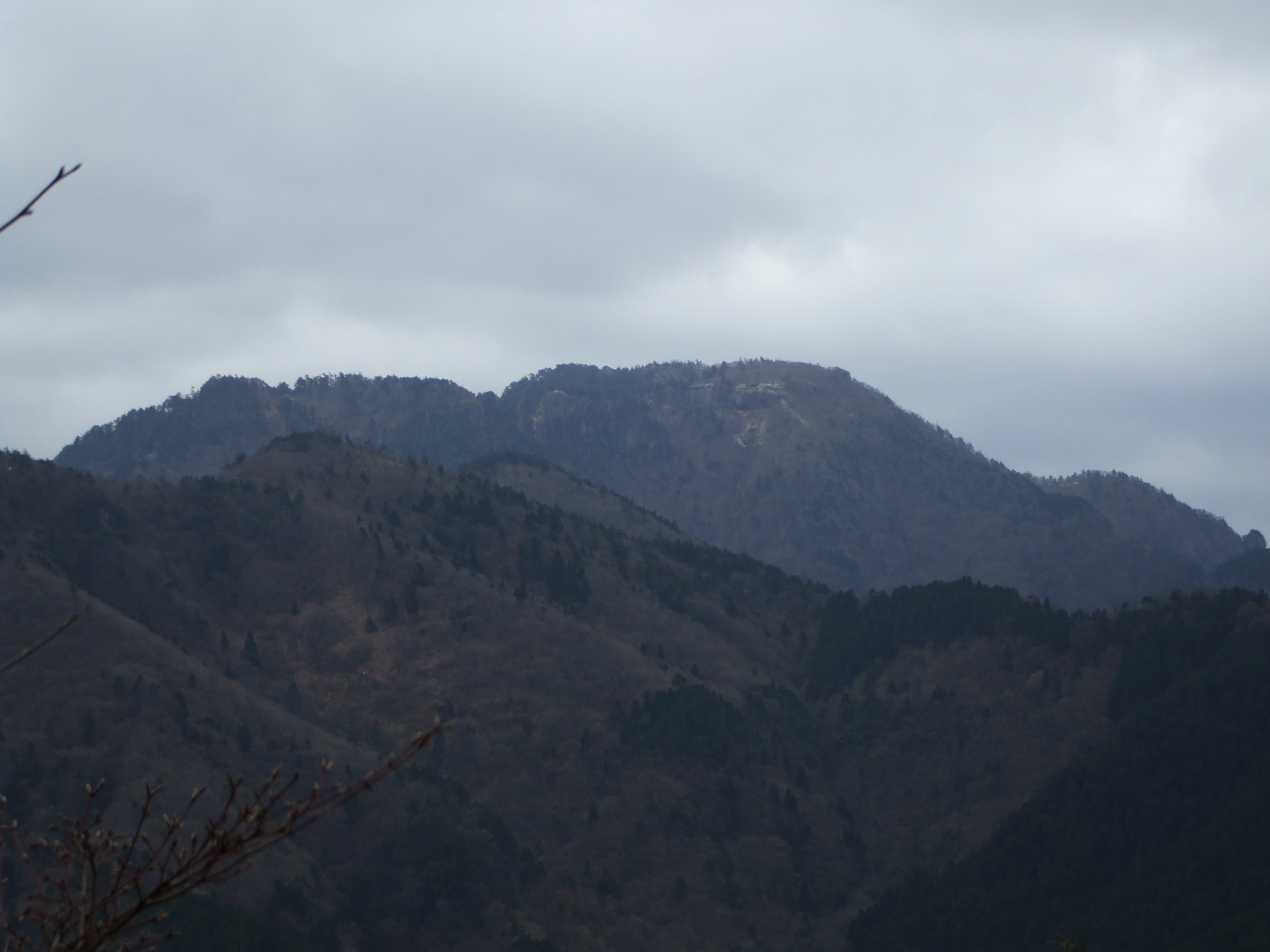
Mount Sanjō from Mount Ōtenjō (5/2009)
