= Mount Shisuniwa =

Mountain summit in Antarctica

- 四寸岩山
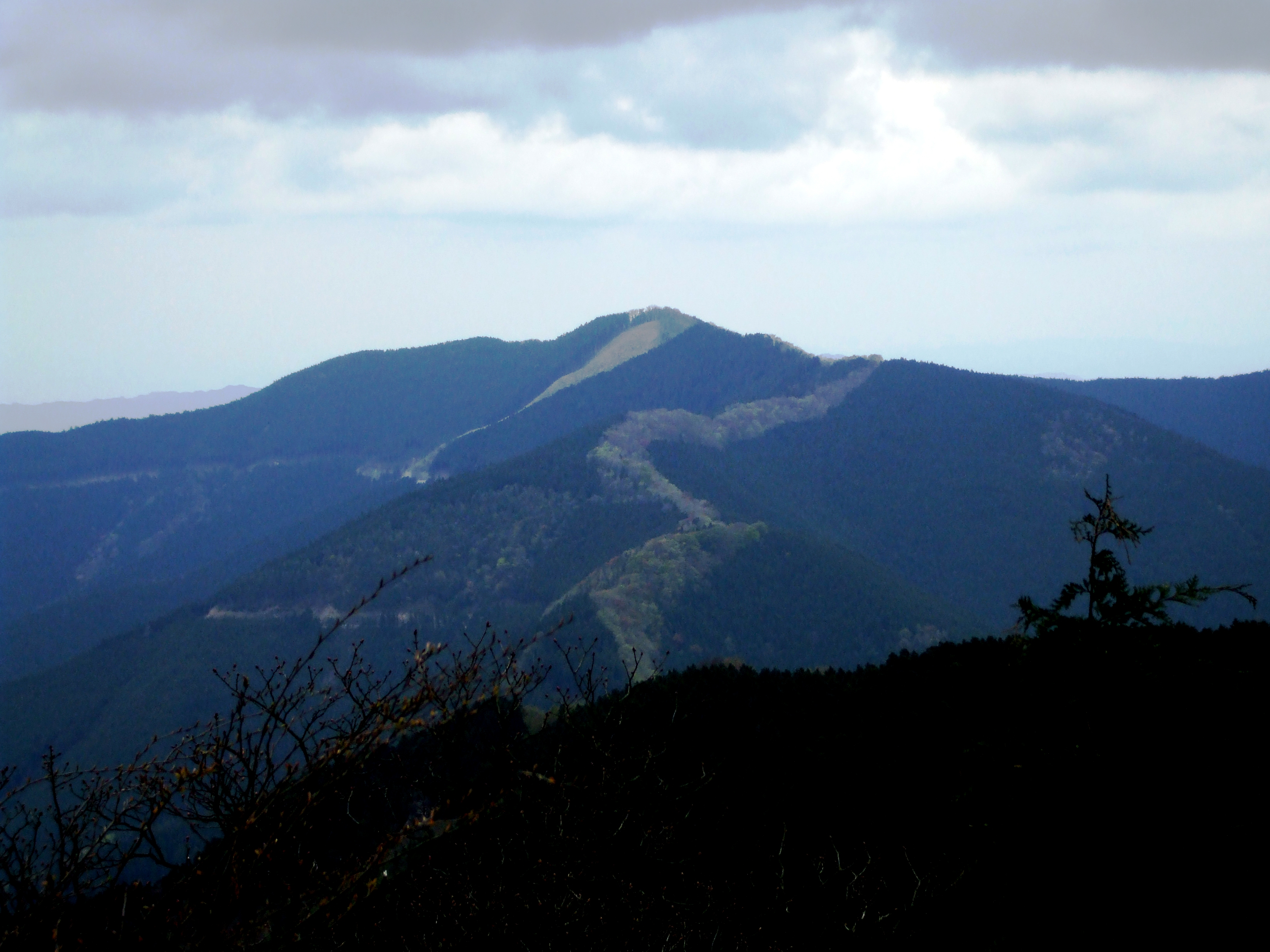
- Seen from the south. Taken from Mount Ōtenjō.

Highest point
- Elevation: 1,235.6 m (4,054 ft)
- Listing: List of mountains and hills of Japan by height
- Coordinates: 34°19′15″N 135°54′35″E

Naming
- Language of name: Japanese
- Pronunciation: [ɕisɯɰ̃iwasaɴ]

Geography
- Location within Japan
- Location: Kurotaki and Kawakami, Nara, Japan
- Parent range: Ōmine Mountain Range

Mount Shisuniwa (四寸岩山, Shisuniwa-san) is a 1,235.6 m (4,054 ft) mountain of Ōmine Mountain Range, located on the border of Kurotaki and Kawakami, Nara, Japan. This mountain is on the route of Ōmine Okugakemichi.

Shisuniwa literally means ‘the rock of four “sun” (=12 cm)’. The other names of this mountain are, Mount Yonsun (Yonsuniwa-san) and Mount Moriya (Moriya-dake).

== Route ==
There are two major routes to the top of this mountain. The most popular route is from Yoshinoyama Station, and it takes four hours and 50 minutes to the top. The other route from Dorokawa, Kawakami via Mount Ōtenjō and it takes five hours 40 minutes.

== Access ==
- Yoshinoyama Station of Yoshino Ohmine ke-buru Ropeway
- Dorokawa Bus Stop of Nara Kotsu

== Gallery ==
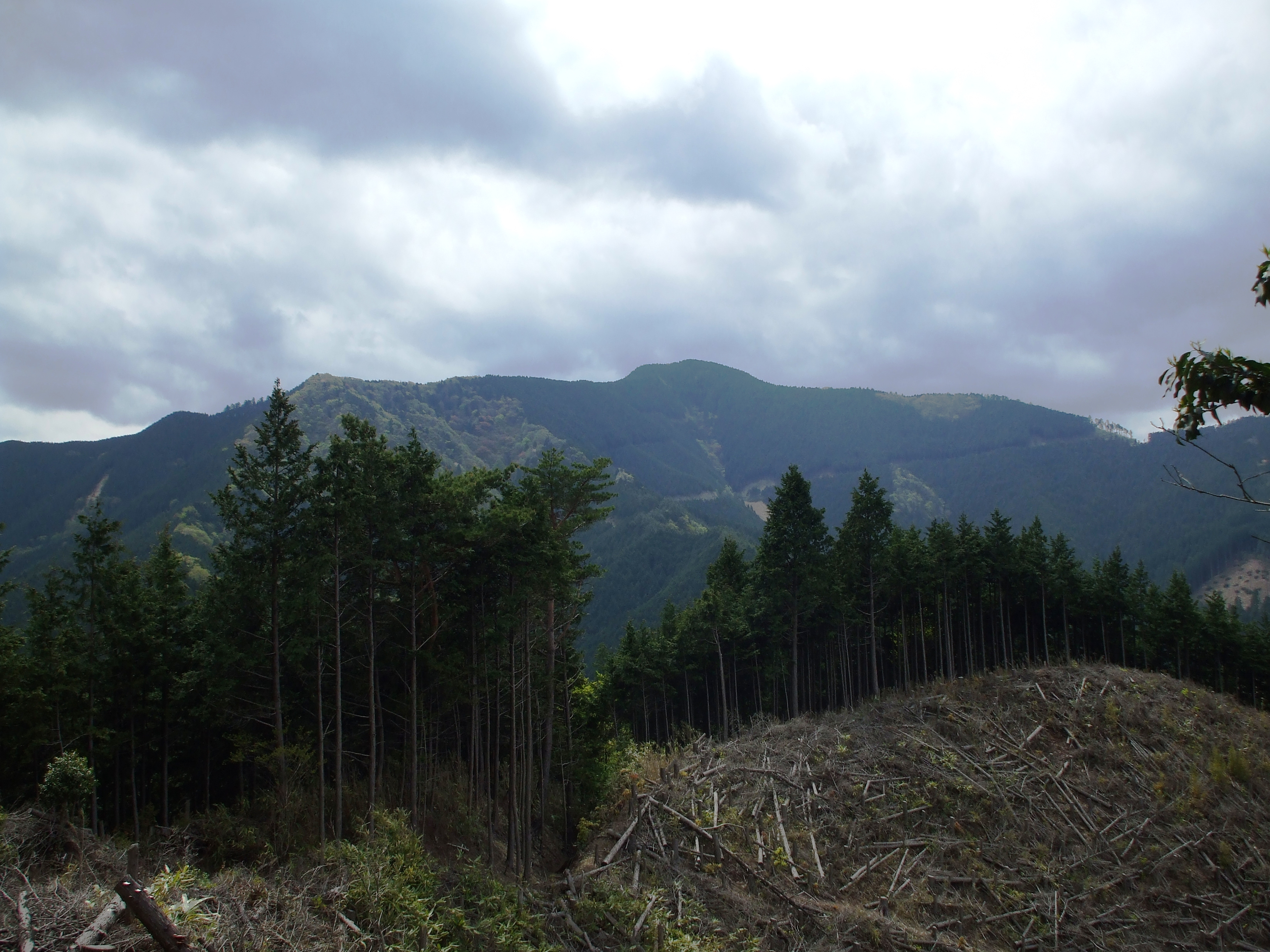
Mount Shisuniwa from the northwest

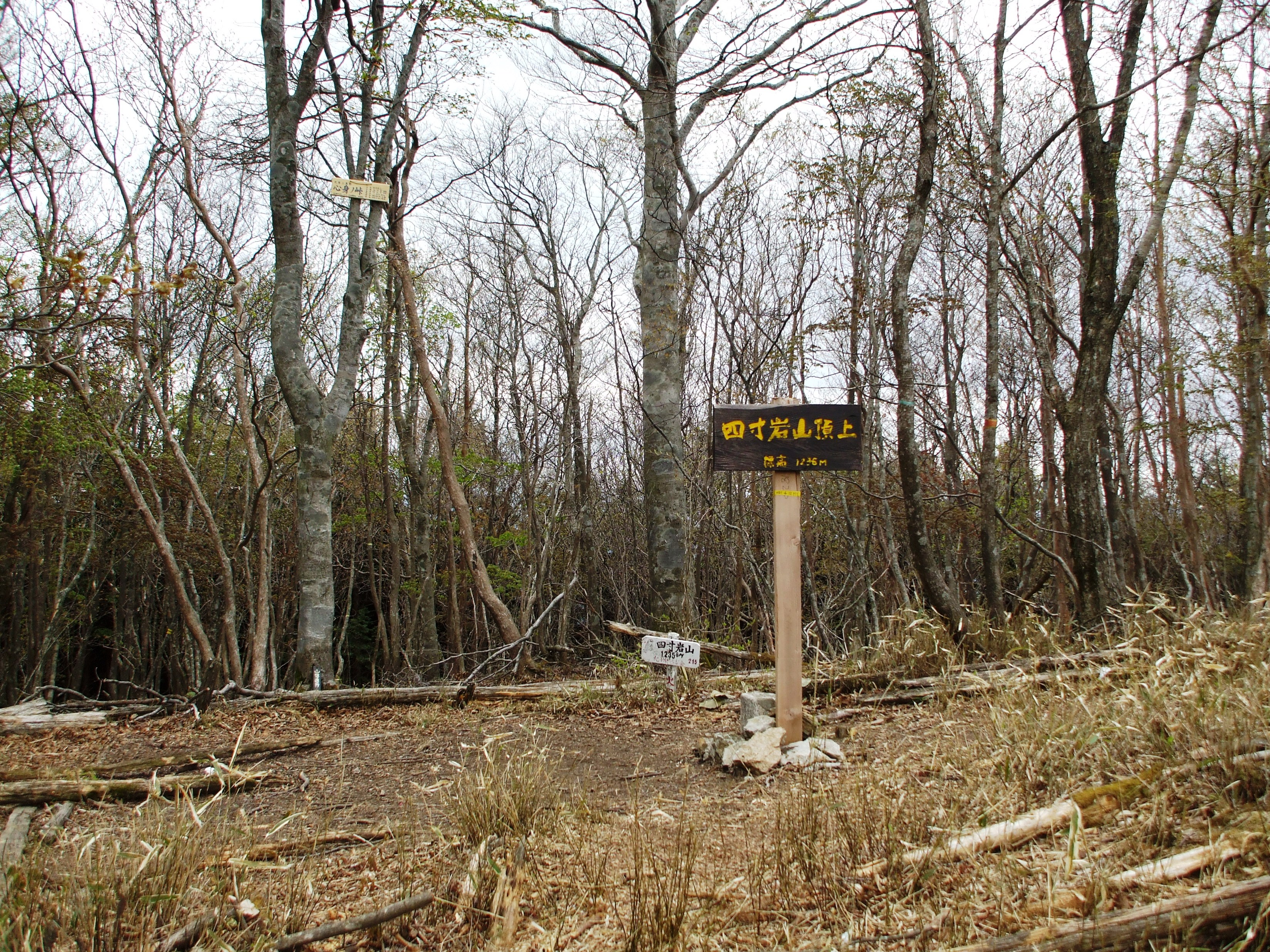
The top of Mount Shisuniwa

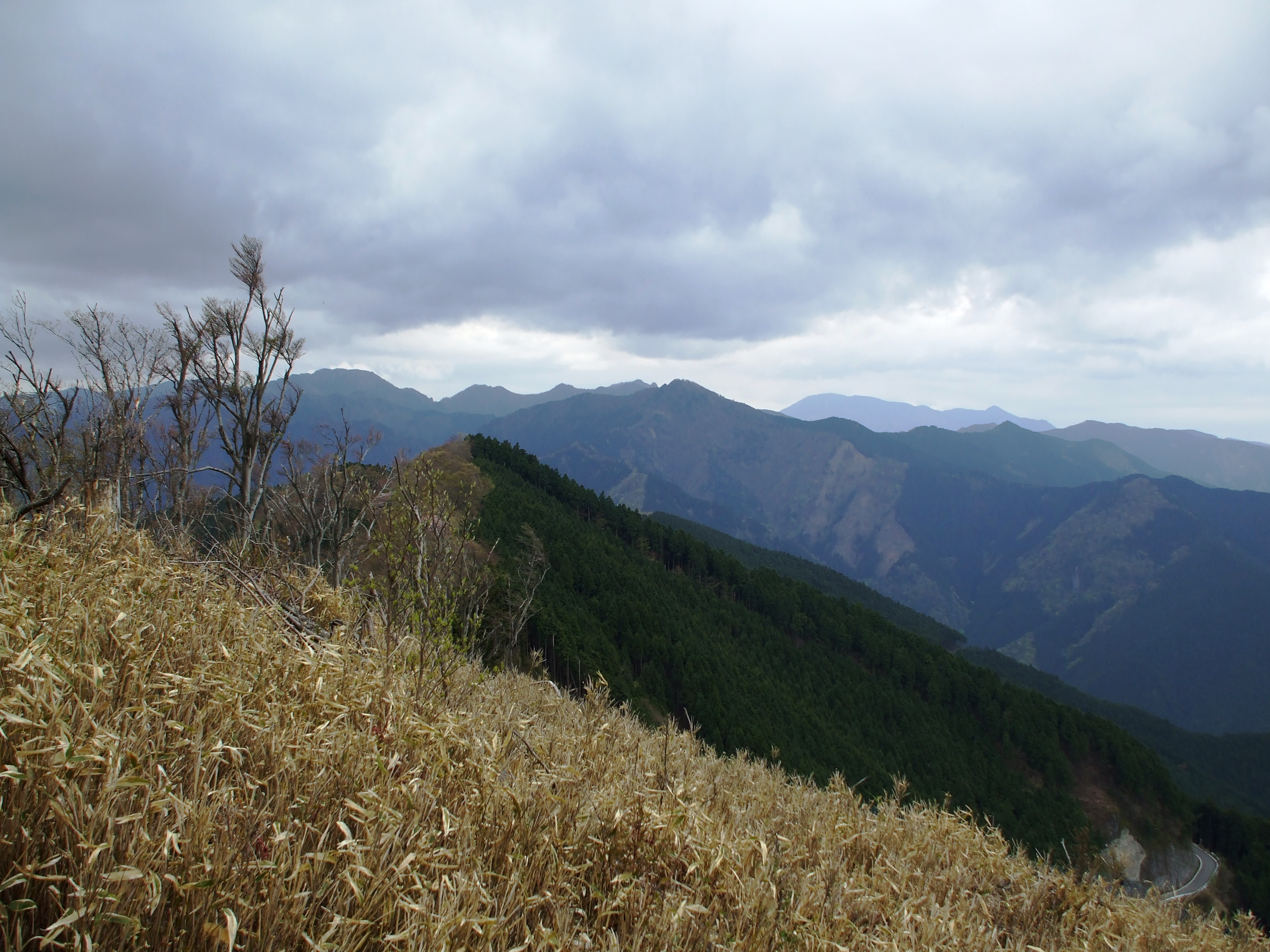
South view from the top of Mount Shisuniwa

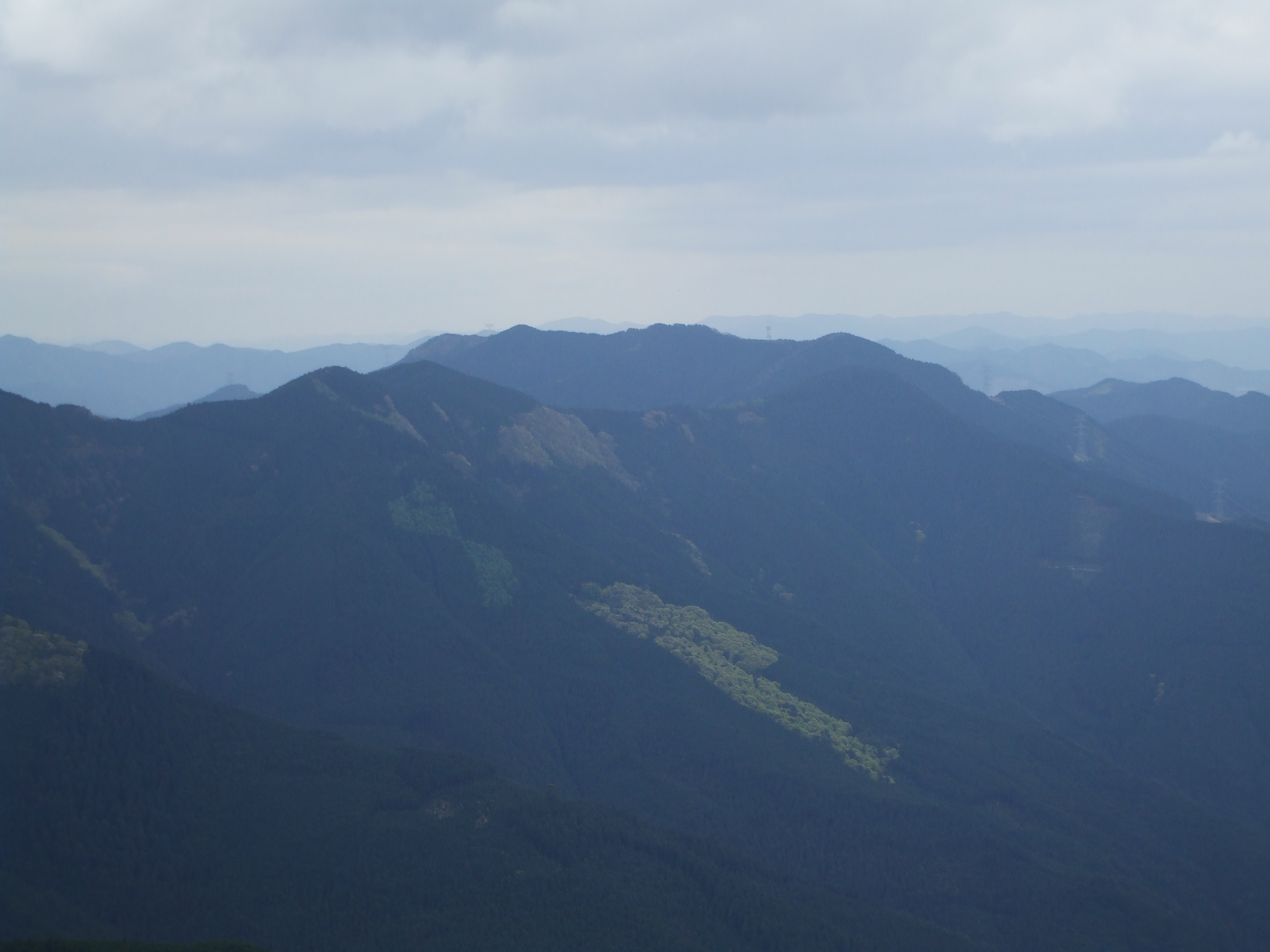
Southwest view from the top of Mount Shisuniwa

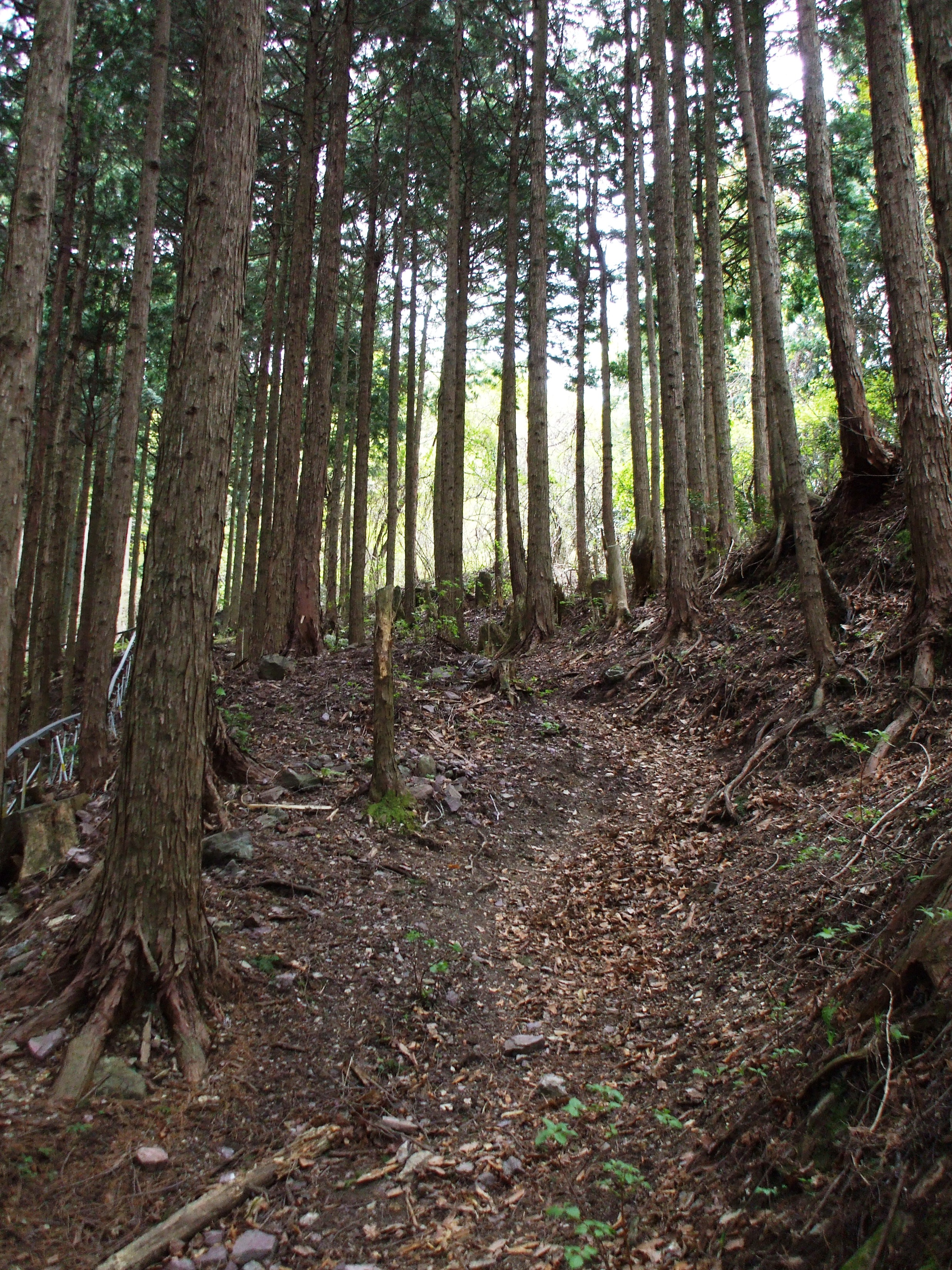
A view on the route to Mount Shisuniwa
