= Oomine =

Oomine may refer to:

- Mount Ōmine, a mountain in Japan
- 11152 Oomine, a minor planet named after the mountain
