= Kawakami, Nara =

Kawakami 川上村
- Village
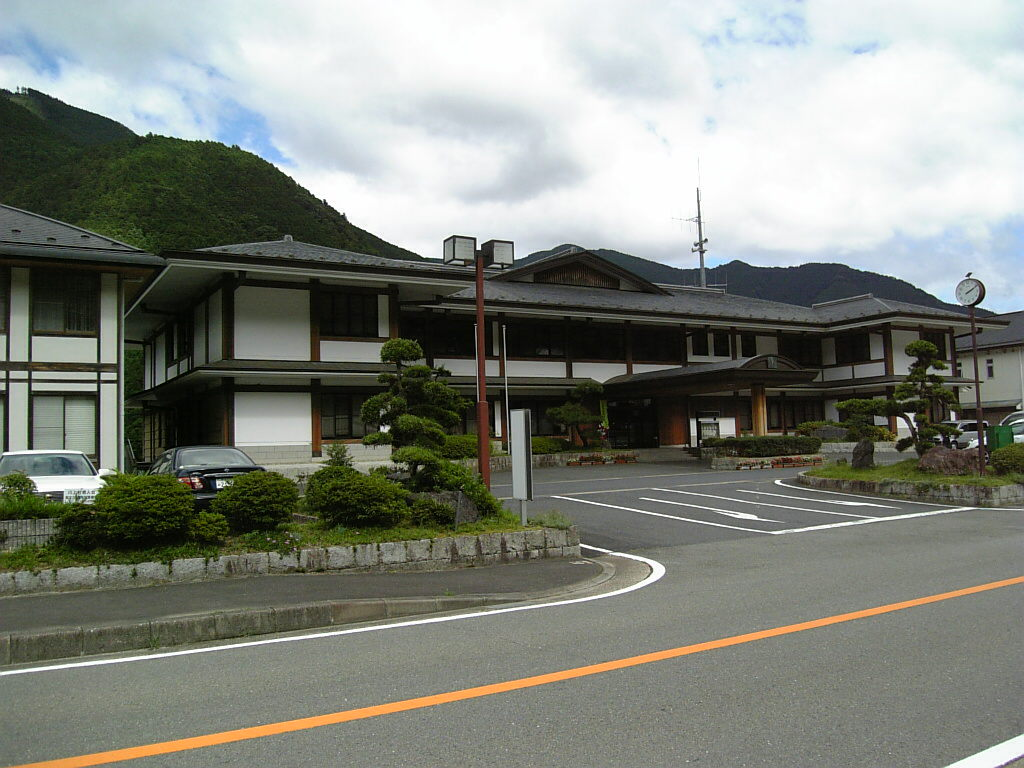
- Kawakami Village Hall

- Flag Chapter
- Interactive map of Kawakami
- Location in Japan
- Coordinates: 34°20′18″N 135°57′16″E
- Country: Japan
- Region: Kansai
- Prefecture: Nara
- District: Yoshino

Government
  - Mayor: Takao Izumiya

Area
  - Total: 269.26 km^{2} (103.96 sq mi)

Population (January 1, 2025)
  - Total: 1,023
  - Density: 3.799/km^{2} (9.840/sq mi)
- Time zone: UTC+09:00 (JST)
- City hall address: 1335-7 Sako, Kawakami-mura, Yoshino-gun, Nara-ken 639-3594
- Website: Official website
- Symbols
- Bird: Varied tit
- Flower: Kerria japonica
- Tree: Yoshino Cedar (Cryptomeria)

Kawakami (川上村, Kawakami-mura) is a village located in Yoshino District, Nara Prefecture, Japan. As of 1 January 2025, the village had an estimated population of 1,023 and a population density of 3.8 persons per km^{2}. The total area of the village is 269.26 km^{2} (103.96 sq mi).

== Geography ==
Kawakami is located in central Nara Prefecture. The majority of the village is mountainous. The Ōmine Mountains are on the west side and the Daidaka Mountains on the east side. The area is the source of the Yoshino River, on which the Osako Dam and Otaki Dam are located. The area has many limestone caves and hot springs.

=== Surrounding municipalities ===
Mie Prefecture

- Matsusaka
- Ōdai

Nara Prefecture

- Yoshino
- Kurotaki
- Tenkawa
- Kamikitayama
- Higashiyoshino

=== Climate ===
Kawakami has a humid subtropical climate (Köppen Cfa) characterized by warm summers and cool winters with light to no snowfall. The average annual temperature in Kawakami is 11.1 °C. The average annual rainfall is 2422 mm with September as the wettest month. The temperatures are highest on average in August, at around 22.3 °C, and lowest in January, at around -0.4 °C.

=== Demographics ===
Per Japanese census data, the population of Kawakami is as shown below. In the quarter century between 1991 and 2016, no birth had been recorded in the Sogio district of Kawakami village.

Historical population
Year	Pop.	±%
1940	7,963	—
1950	7,864	−1.2%
1960	8,084	+2.8%
1970	6,020	−25.5%
1980	4,151	−31.0%
1990	3,093	−25.5%
2000	2,558	−17.3%
2010	1,643	−35.8%
2020	1,156	−29.6%

== History ==
The area of Kawakami was part of ancient Yamato Province. The discovery of the Miyanohira ruins (submerged under the Otaki Dam), believed to date back to the Jomon period, proves that the area of Kawakami has been inhabited since ancient times. The village of Kawakami was established on April 1, 1889, with the creation of the modern municipalities system.

== Government ==
Kawakami has a mayor-council form of government with a directly elected mayor and a unicameral village council of eight members. Kawakami, collectively with the other municipalities of Yoshino District, contributes two members to the Nara Prefectural Assembly. In terms of national politics, the village is part of the Nara 3rd district of the lower house of the Diet of Japan.

== Economy ==
The local economy is based on tourism and forestry. Due to the terrain, there is very little commercial agriculture.

== Education ==
Kawakami has one public combined elementary/junior high school operated by the village government. The village does not have a high school.

== Transportation ==
=== Railways ===
Kawakami has no passenger railway service. The nearest train station is Yamato-Kamiichi Station on the Kintetsu Yoshino Line in Yoshino.

=== Highways ===
- National Route 169

== Local attractions ==
- Ohtaki Dam
- Ohsako Dam

== Notable people from Kawakami ==
- Daimanazuru Kenji, former sumo wrestler
