= Tenkawa, Nara =

Tenkawa 天川村
- Village
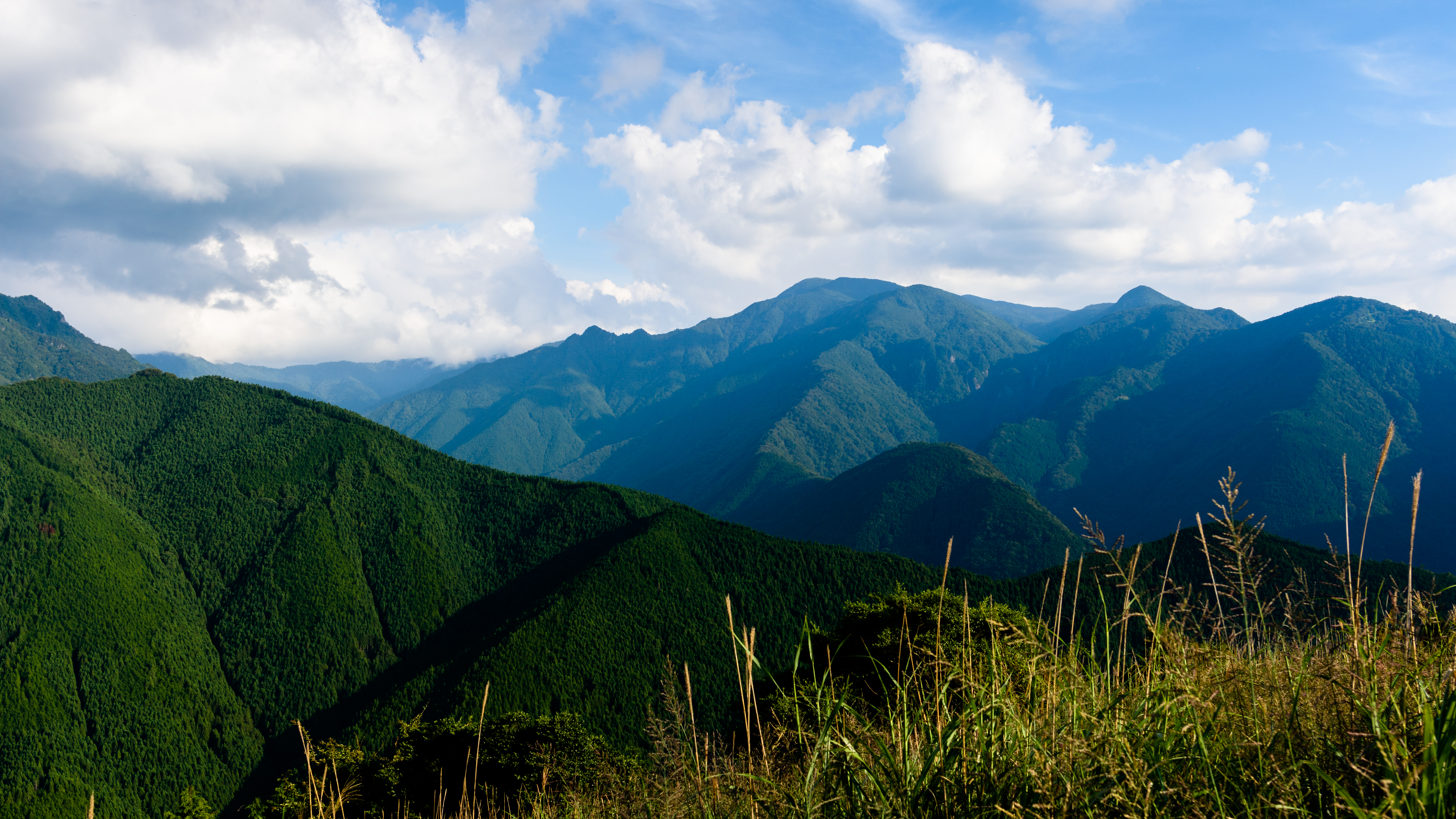

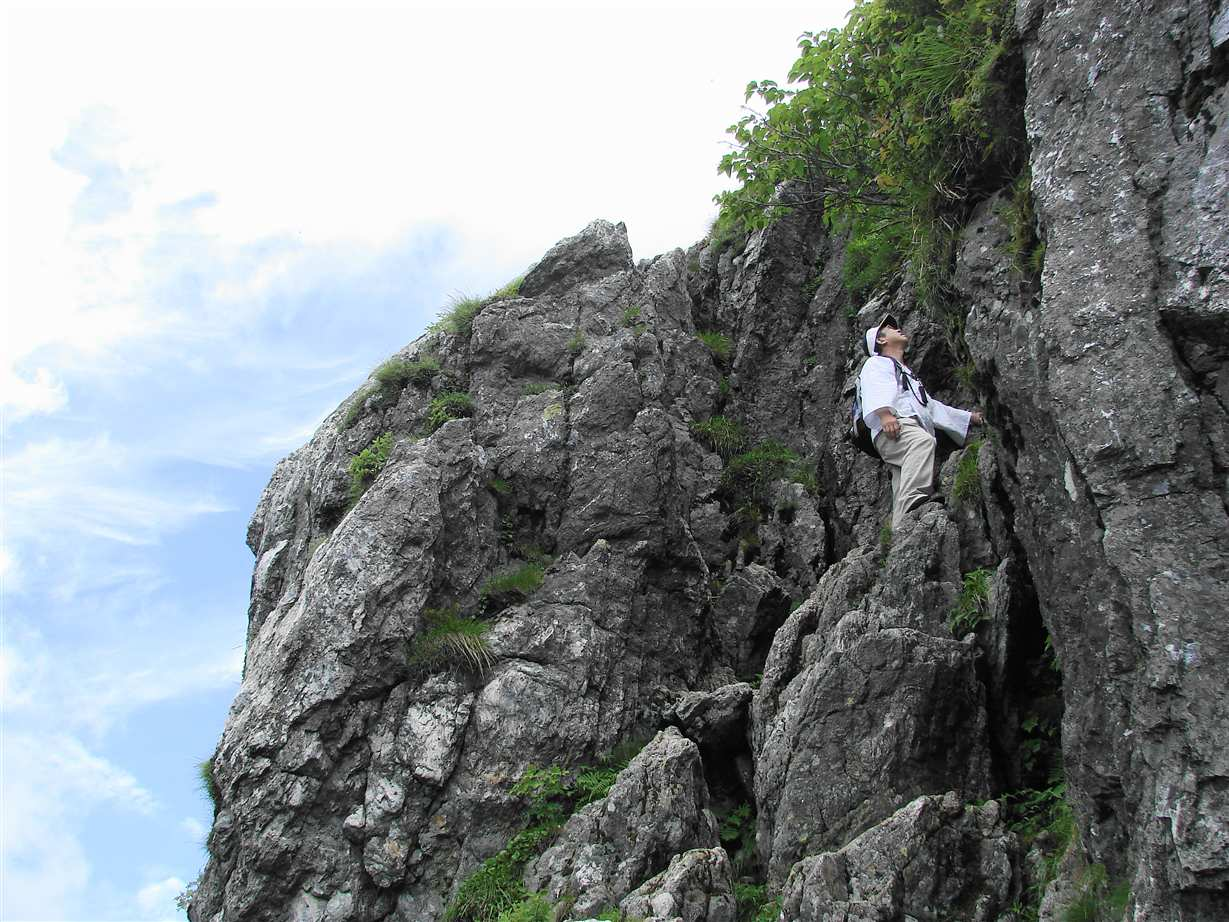

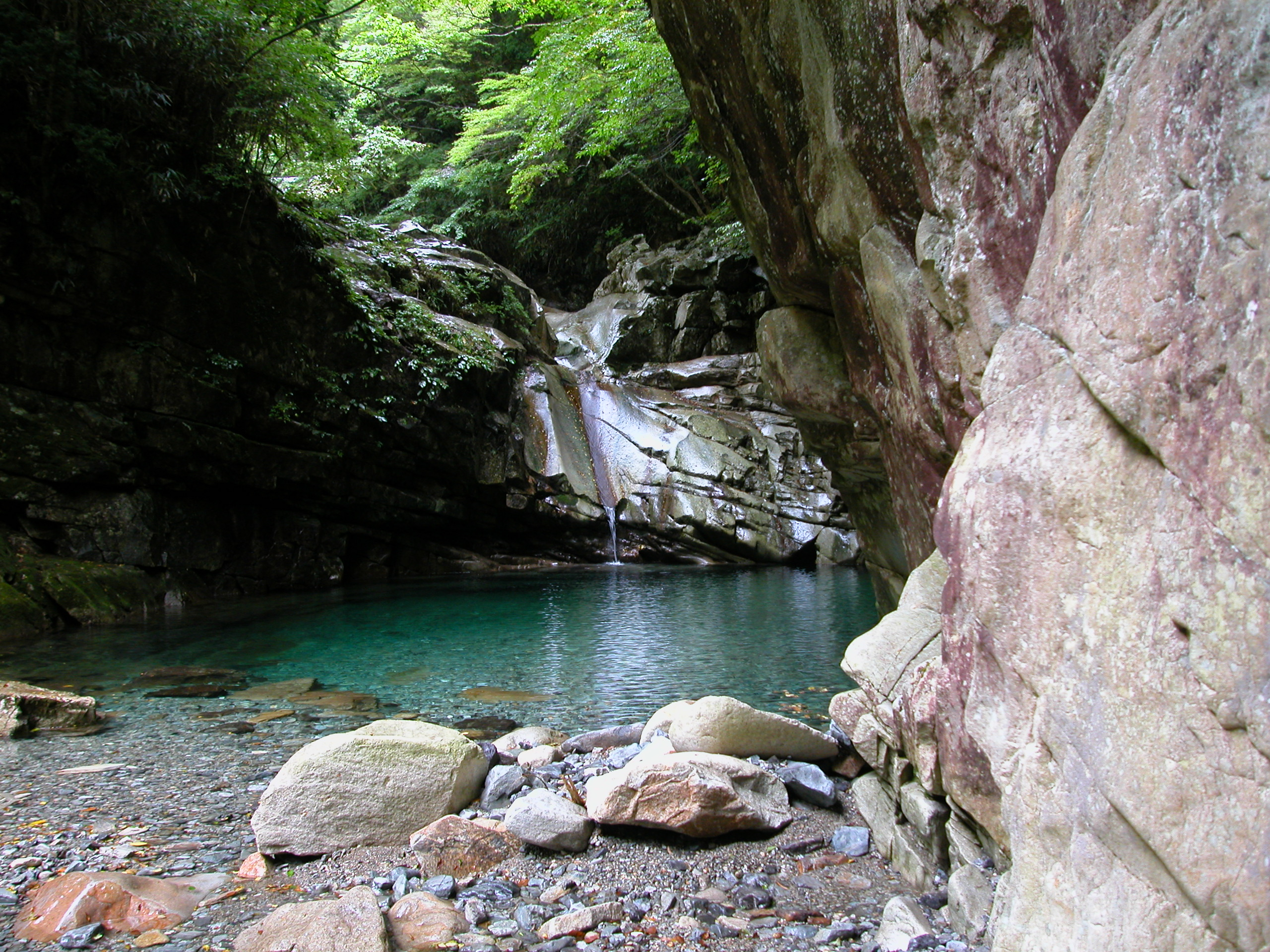

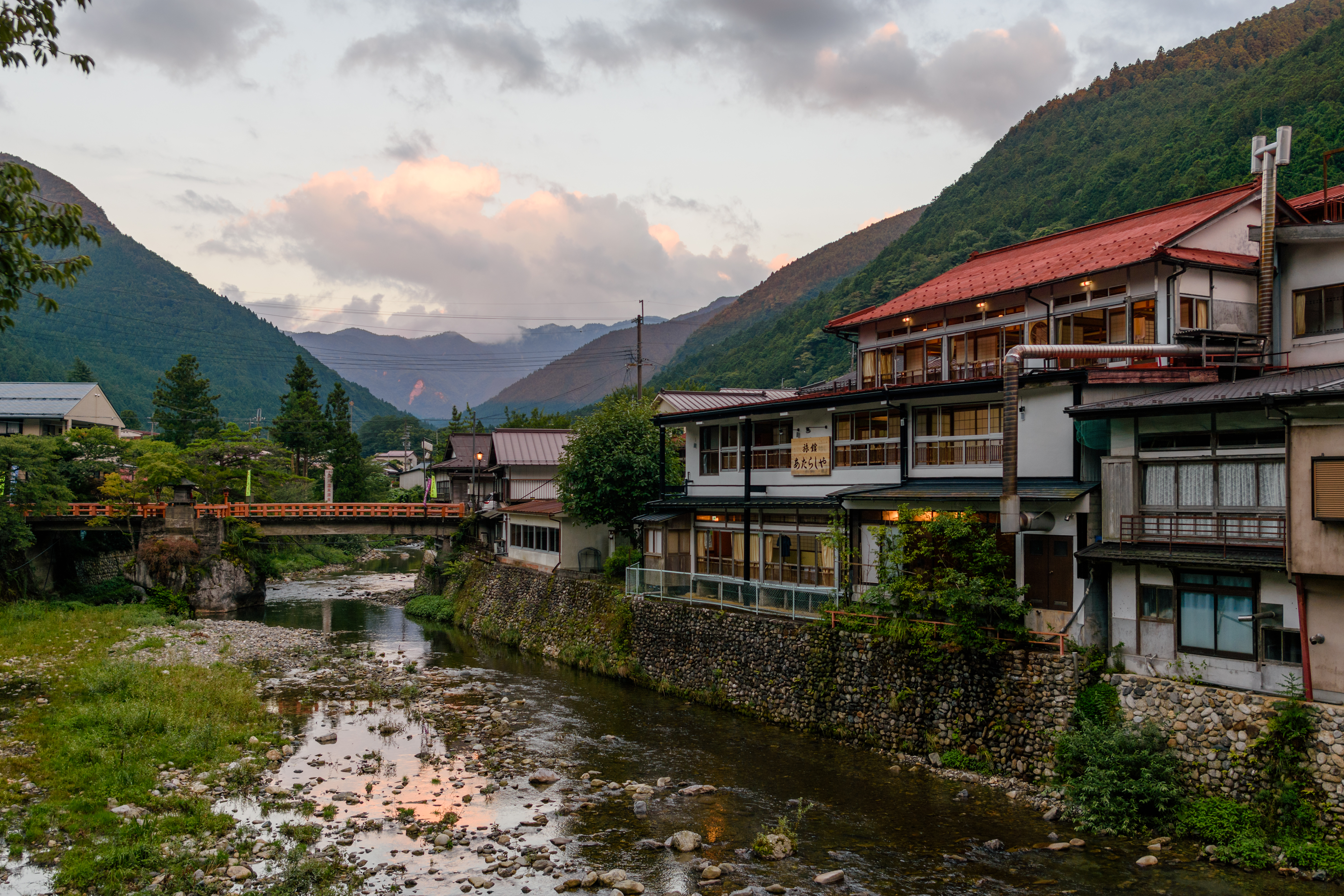

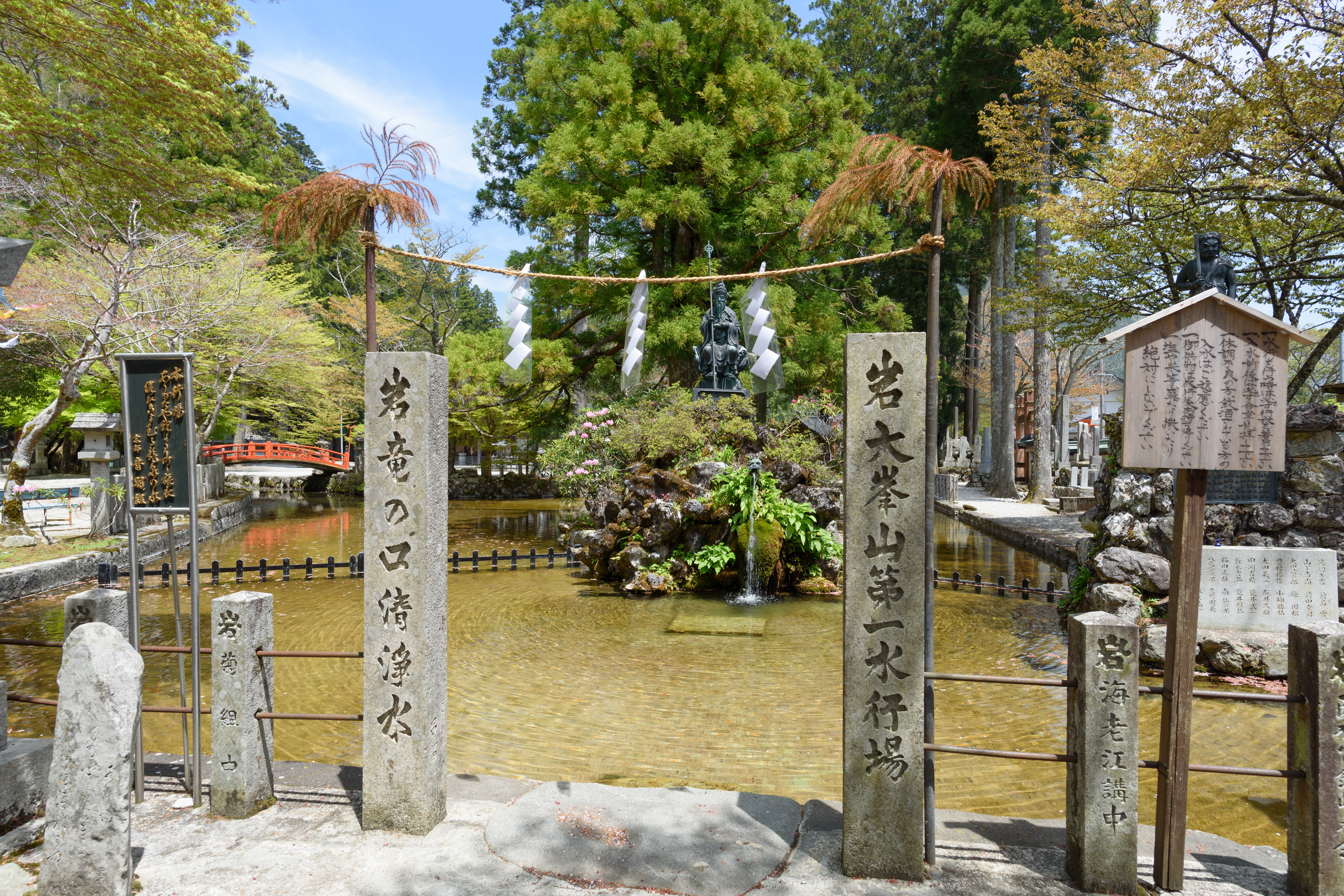

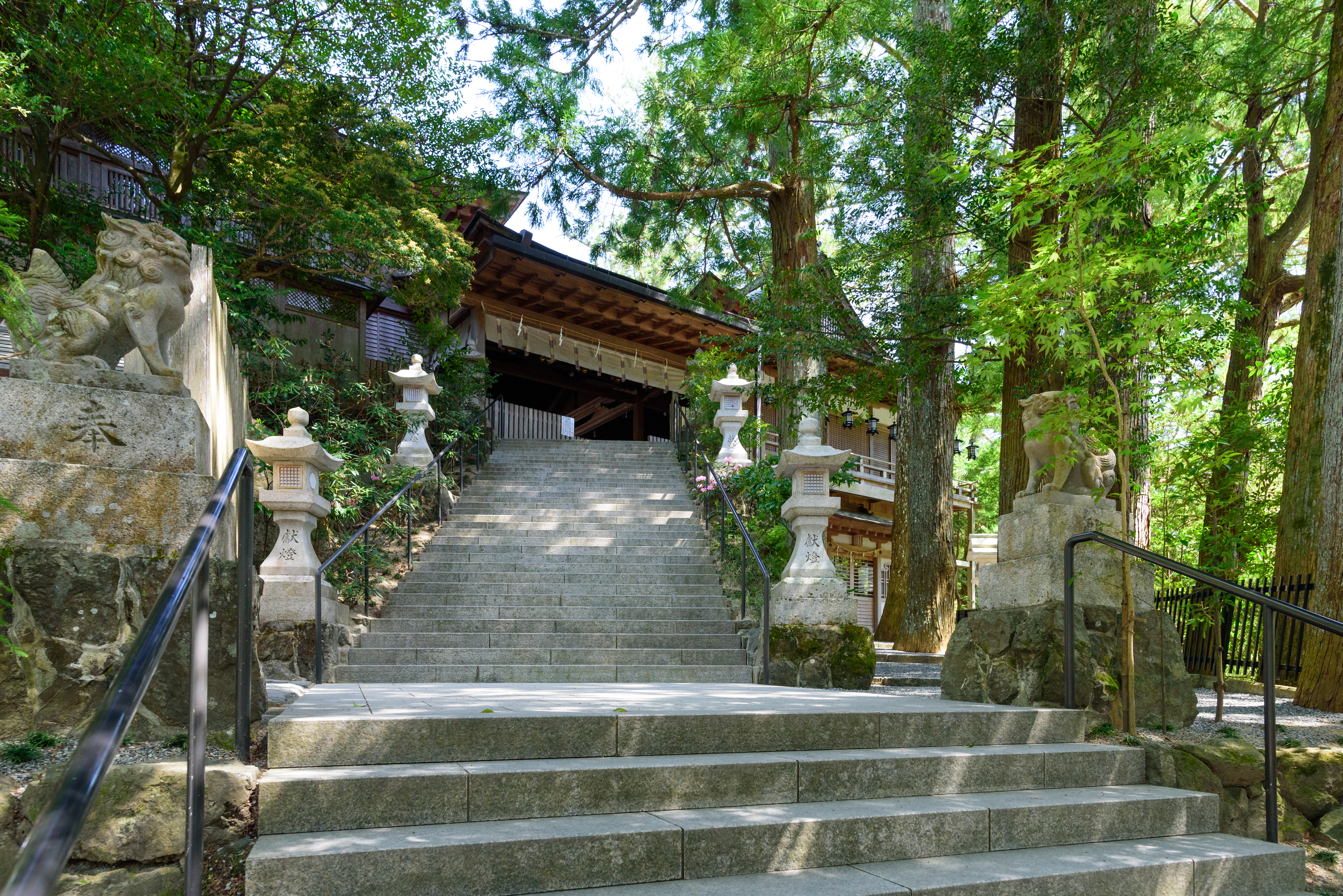
Mount Misen
Mount Yamakami	Gama Falls
Dorogawa Onsen	Ryusen-ji
Tenkawa Dai-Benzaiten-sha
- Flag Emblem
- Location of Tenkawa in Nara Prefecture

- Location in Japan
- Coordinates: 34°14′31″N 135°51′19″E
- Country: Japan
- Region: Kansai
- Prefecture: Nara
- District: Yoshino

Government
  - Mayor: Shigetaka Kurumiya

Area
  - Total: 175.66 km^{2} (67.82 sq mi)

Population (January 1, 2025)
  - Total: 1,031
  - Density: 5.869/km^{2} (15.20/sq mi)
- Time zone: UTC+09:00 (JST)
- City hall address: 60 Ōaza Sawatani, Tenkawa-mura, Yoshino-gun, Nara-ken 638-0305
- Website: Official website
- Symbols
- Bird: Komadori (Japanese robin)
- Flower: Ooyama renge (Magnolia sieboldii)
- Tree: Sugi (Cryptomeria)

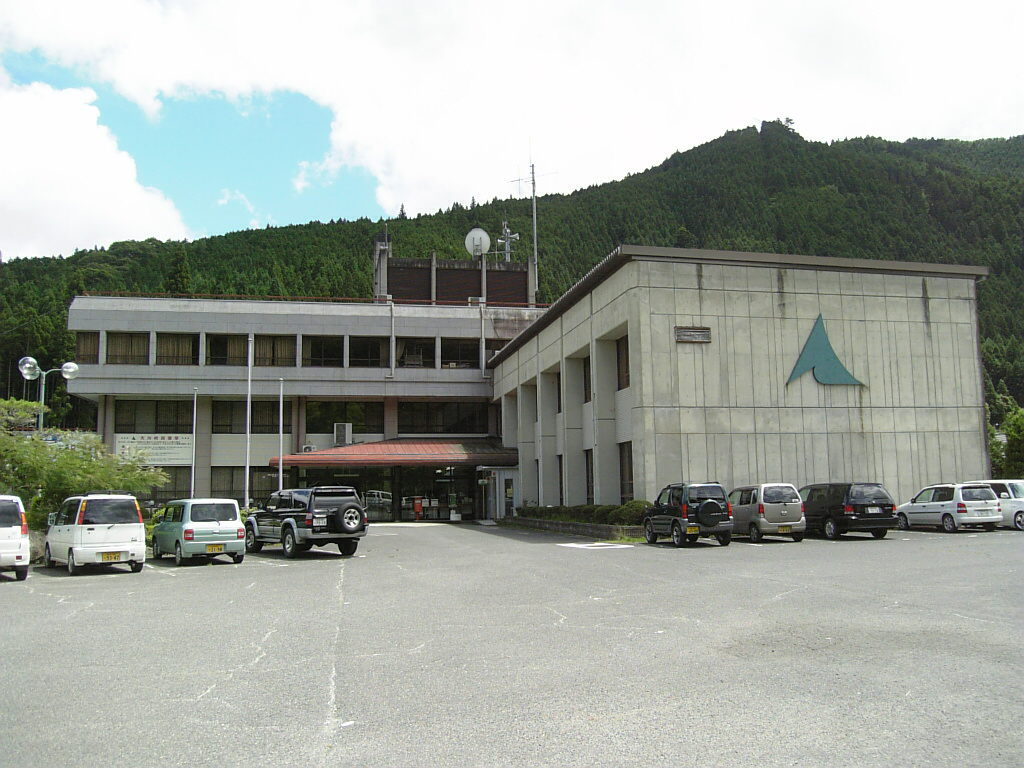
Tenkawa Village Hall

Tenkawa (天川村, Tenkawa-mura) is a village located in Yoshino District, Nara Prefecture, Japan. As of 1 January 2025, the village had an estimated population of 1,031 and a population density of 5.9 persons per km^{2}. The total area of the village is 175.66 km^{2} (67.82 sq mi).

== Geography ==
Located in central Nara Prefecture, the area of Tenkawa is dominated by the Ōmine Mountain Range. It is home to the highest peak in the Kinki region, Mount Hakkyō (1,915 meters), and the Tennokawa River, the source of the Kumano River, flows through the area. Parts of the village are within the borders of the Yoshino-Kumano National Park and also part of the Sacred Sites and Pilgrimage Routes in the Kii Mountain Range World Heritage Site.

=== Surrounding municipalities ===
Nara Prefecture

- Gojō
- Kurotaki
- Kawakami
- Kamikitayama

=== Climate ===
Tenkawa has a humid subtropical climate (Köppen Cfa) characterized by warm summers and cool winters with light to no snowfall. The average annual temperature in Tenkawa is 11.0 °C. The average annual rainfall is 2119 mm with September as the wettest month. The temperatures are highest on average in August, at around 22.1 °C, and lowest in January, at around -0.4 °C.

=== Demographics ===
Per Japanese census data, the population of Tenkawa is as shown below:

Historical population
Year	Pop.	±%
1940	5,784	—
1950	5,408	−6.5%
1960	5,263	−2.7%
1970	4,040	−23.2%
1980	3,207	−20.6%
1990	2,519	−21.5%
2000	2,104	−16.5%
2010	1,572	−25.3%
2020	1,176	−25.2%

== History ==
The area of Tenkawa was part of ancient Yamato Province. Its location of the deep mountains and secluded valleys led to it becoming a pilgrimage center for mountain worship and a training ground for ascetics from the Heian period onwards. The village of Tenkawa was established on April 1, 1889, with the creation of the modern municipalities system.

== Government ==
Tenkawa has a mayor-council form of government with a directly elected mayor and a unicameral village council of eight members. Tenkawa, collectively with the other municipalities of Yoshino District, contributes two members to the Nara Prefectural Assembly. In terms of national politics, the village is part of the Nara 3rd district of the lower house of the Diet of Japan.

== Economy ==
The local economy is based on tourism. The majority of the village area is covered by cedar forests, and forestry and lumbering have traditionally been important industries, but the decline in the number of workers, has led to depopulation and an aging population.

== Education ==
Tenkawa has one public combined elementary/junior high school operated by the village government. The village does not have a high school.

== Transportation ==
=== Railways ===
Tenkawa has no passenger railway service. The nearest train station is Shimoichiguchi Station on the Kintetsu Yoshino Line in Yoshino.

=== Highways ===
- National Route 309

== Local attractions ==
Tenkawa is near the base of Mount Ōmine, also known as Mount Sanjō, the headquarters of the Shugendō religion.

=== Notable places ===
- Dorogawa Hot Springs
- Mitarai Valley
- Mount Ōmine Ryusenji Temple
- Mount Ōmine Temple
- Ten-no-kawa Hot Springs
- Yoshino-Kumano National Park

== See also ==
- Mount Omine
