= Ohsako Dam =

Dam in Nara Prefecture, Japan

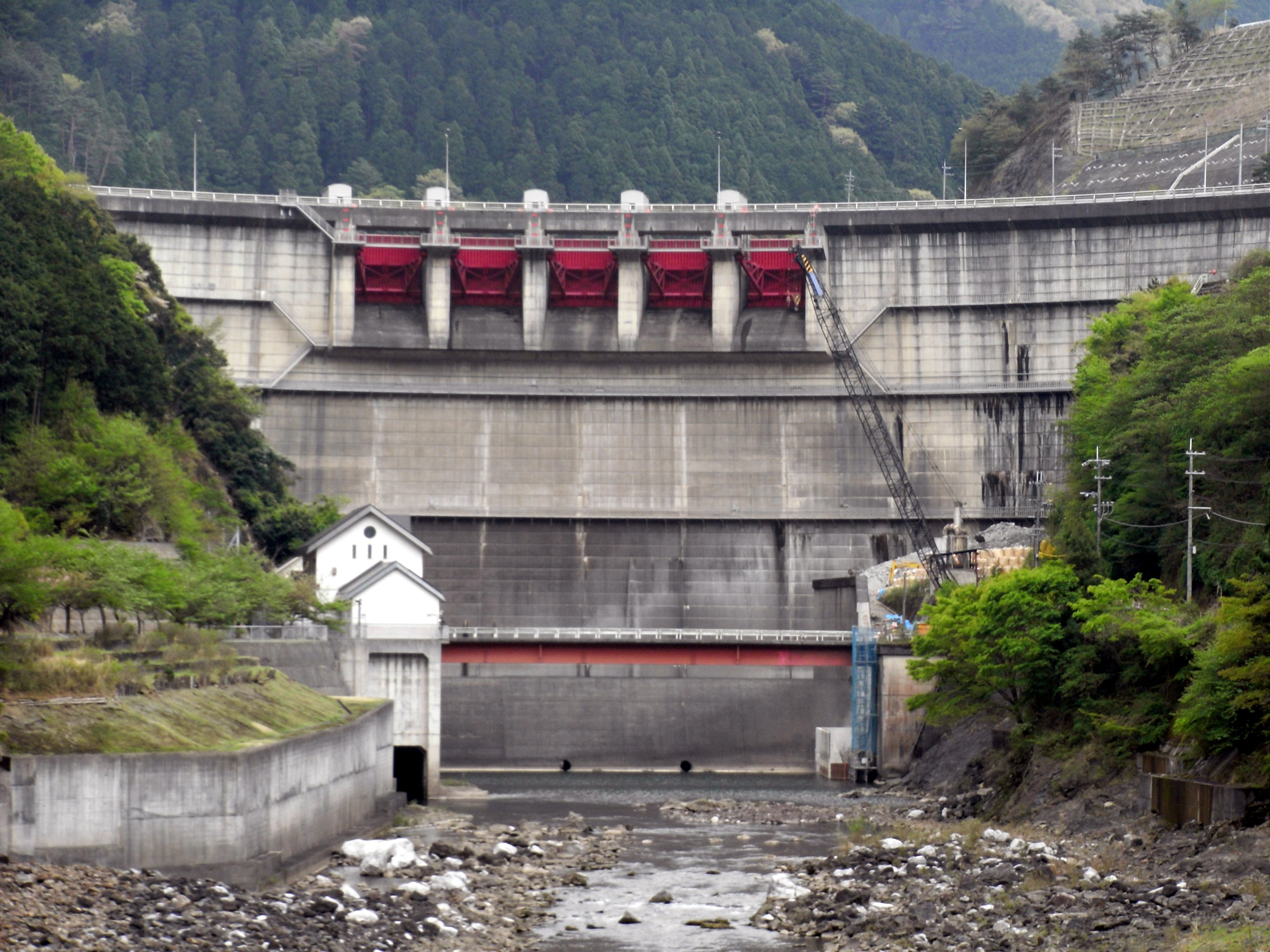
- Location: Nara Prefecture, Japan
- Coordinates: 34°16′26″N 136°0′45″E
- Construction began: 1954
- Opening date: 1973

Dam and spillways
- Height: 70.5m
- Length: 222.3m

Reservoir
- Total capacity: 27750 thousand cubic meters
- Catchment area: 114.8 sq. km
- Surface area: 107 hectares

Ohsako Dam is a concrete arch dam located in Nara prefecture in Japan. The dam is used for agriculture, waters supply and power production. The catchment area of the dam is 114.8 km^{2}. The dam impounds about 107 ha of land when full and can store 27750 thousand cubic meters of water. The construction of the dam was started in 1954 and completed in 1973.
