= Ohtaki Dam =

Dam in Nara Prefecture, Japan

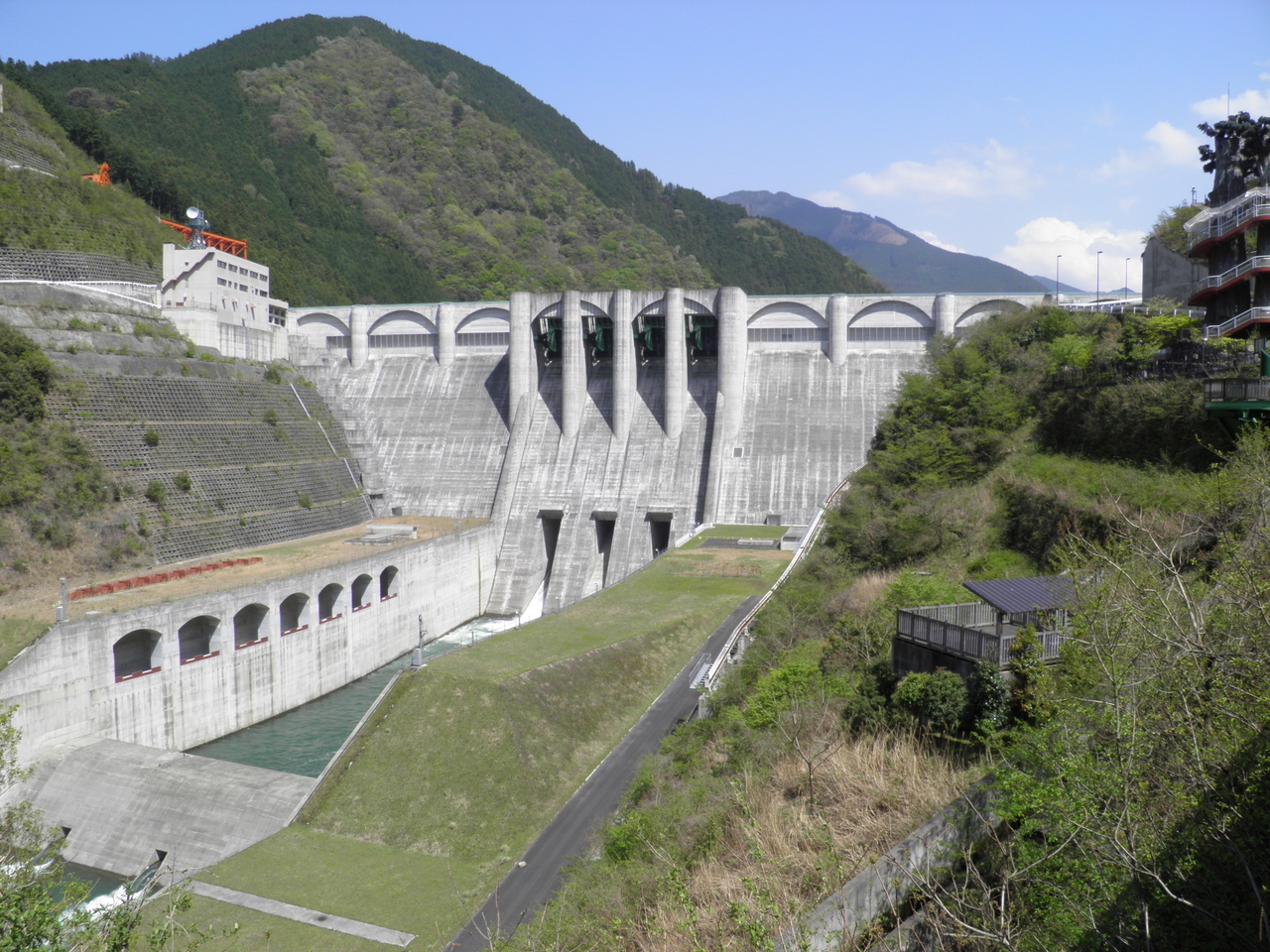
- Location: Nara Prefecture, Japan
- Coordinates: 34°21′12″N 135°56′06″E
- Construction began: 1962
- Opening date: 2012

Dam and spillways
- Height: 100m
- Length: 315m

Reservoir
- Total capacity: 84000 thousand cubic meters
- Catchment area: 258 sq. km
- Surface area: 251 hectares

Ohtaki Dam is a concrete gravity dam located in Nara prefecture in Japan. The dam is used for flood control, water supply, irrigation and power production. The catchment area of the dam is 258 km^{2}. The dam impounds about 251 ha of land when full and can store 84000 thousand cubic meters of water. The construction of the dam was started in 1962 and completed in 2012.
