= Kurotaki, Nara =

Kurotaki 黒滝村
- Village
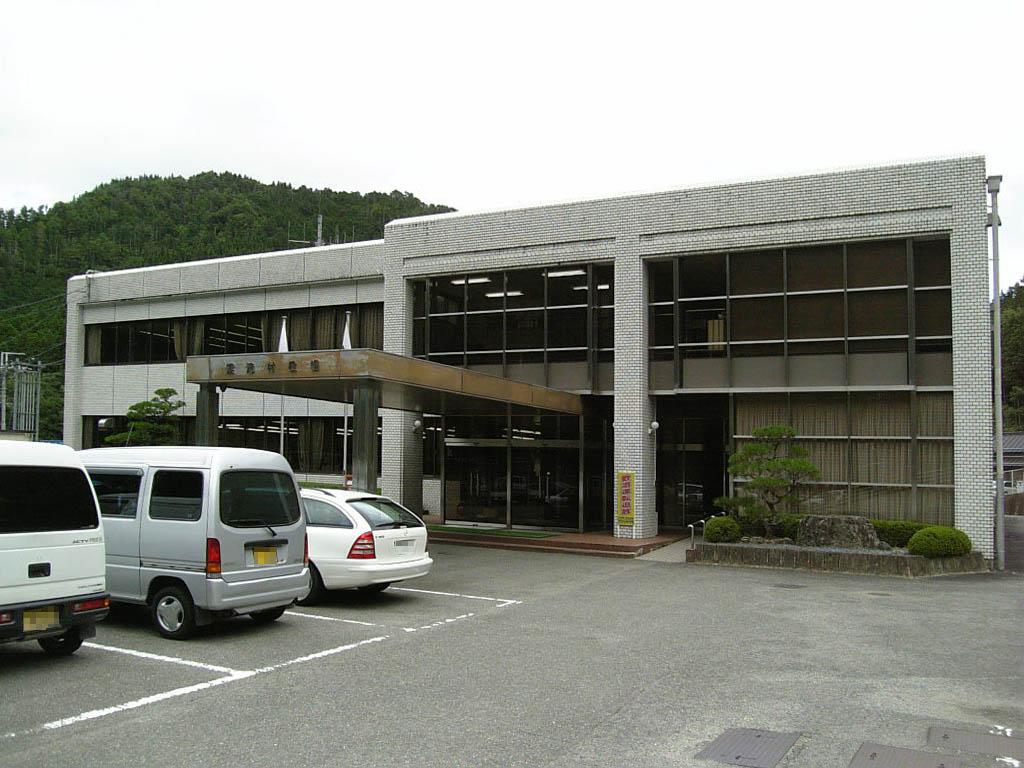
- Kurotaki Village Hall

- Flag Emblem
- Interactive map of Kurotaki
- Location in Japan
- Coordinates: 34°18′33″N 135°51′08″E
- Country: Japan
- Region: Kansai
- Prefecture: Nara
- District: Yoshino

Area
  - Total: 47.70 km^{2} (18.42 sq mi)

Population (January 1, 2025)
  - Total: 536
  - Density: 11.2/km^{2} (29.1/sq mi)
- Time zone: UTC+09:00 (JST)
- City hall address: 77 Terato, Kurotaki-mura, Yoshino-gun, Nara-ken 638-0292
- Website: Official website
- Symbols
- Tree: Cryptomeria

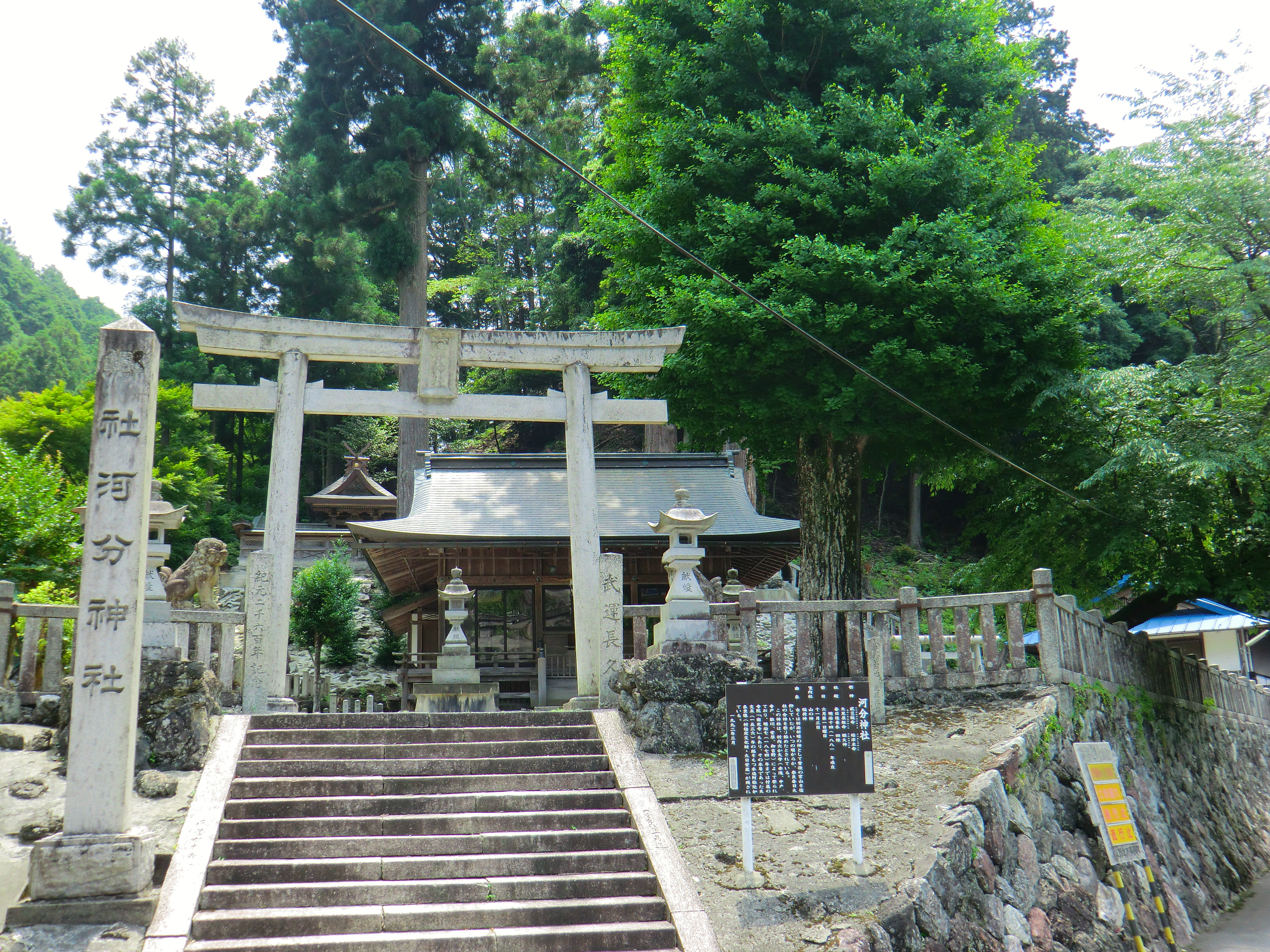
Kawawake Jinja in Kurotaki

Kurotaki (黒滝村, Kurotaki-mura) is a village located in Yoshino District, Nara Prefecture, Japan. As of 1 January 2025, the village had an estimated population of 536 and a population density of 10 persons per km^{2}. The total area of the village is 47.70 km^{2} (18.42 sq mi).

== Geography ==
Kurotaki is located in central Nara Prefecture, north of Mount Yoshino, and Mount Ōmine. it is part of the municipalities in the Kii Mountain Range.

- Mountains: Mount Kashihara, Hyakukaidake

=== Surrounding municipalities ===
Nara Prefecture

- Gojō city
- Kawakami village
- Shimoichi town
- Tenkawa village
- Yoshino town

=== Climate ===
Kurotaki has a humid subtropical climate (Köppen Cfa) characterized by warm summers and cool winters with light to no snowfall. The average annual temperature in Kurotaki is 12.0 °C. The average annual rainfall is 2119 mm with September as the wettest month. The temperatures are highest on average in August, at around 23.4 °C, and lowest in January, at around 0.5 °C.

=== Demographics ===
Per Japanese census data, the population of Kurotaki is as shown below:

Historical population
Year	Pop.	±%
1950	3,496	—
1960	2,978	−14.8%
1970	2,009	−32.5%
1980	1,788	−11.0%
1990	1,472	−17.7%
2000	1,194	−18.9%
2010	840	−29.6%
2020	623	−25.8%

== History ==
The area of Kurotaki was part of ancient Yamato Province. The village of Minamiyoshino was established on April 1, 1889, with the creation of the modern municipalities system. On July 1, 1912 - Minamiyoshino was divided into Kurotaki village and Niu villages.

== Government ==
Kurotaki has a mayor-council form of government with a directly elected mayor and a unicameral village council of six members. Higashiyoshino, collectively with the other municipalities of Yoshino District, contributes two members to the Nara Prefectural Assembly. In terms of national politics, the village is part of the Nara 3rd district of the lower house of the Diet of Japan.

== Economy ==
The local economy is based on agriculture and forestry. Garlic is a noted local crop.

== Education ==
Kurotaki has one public elementary school and one public junior high schools operated by the village government. The village does not have a high school.

== Transportation ==
=== Railways ===
Kurotaki has no passenger railway service. The nearest train station is Shimoichiguchi Station on the Kintetsu Yoshino Line in Yoshino.

=== Highways ===
- National Route 309
