= Mount Ōmine =

Mountain in Nara Prefecture, Japan

- 大峰山
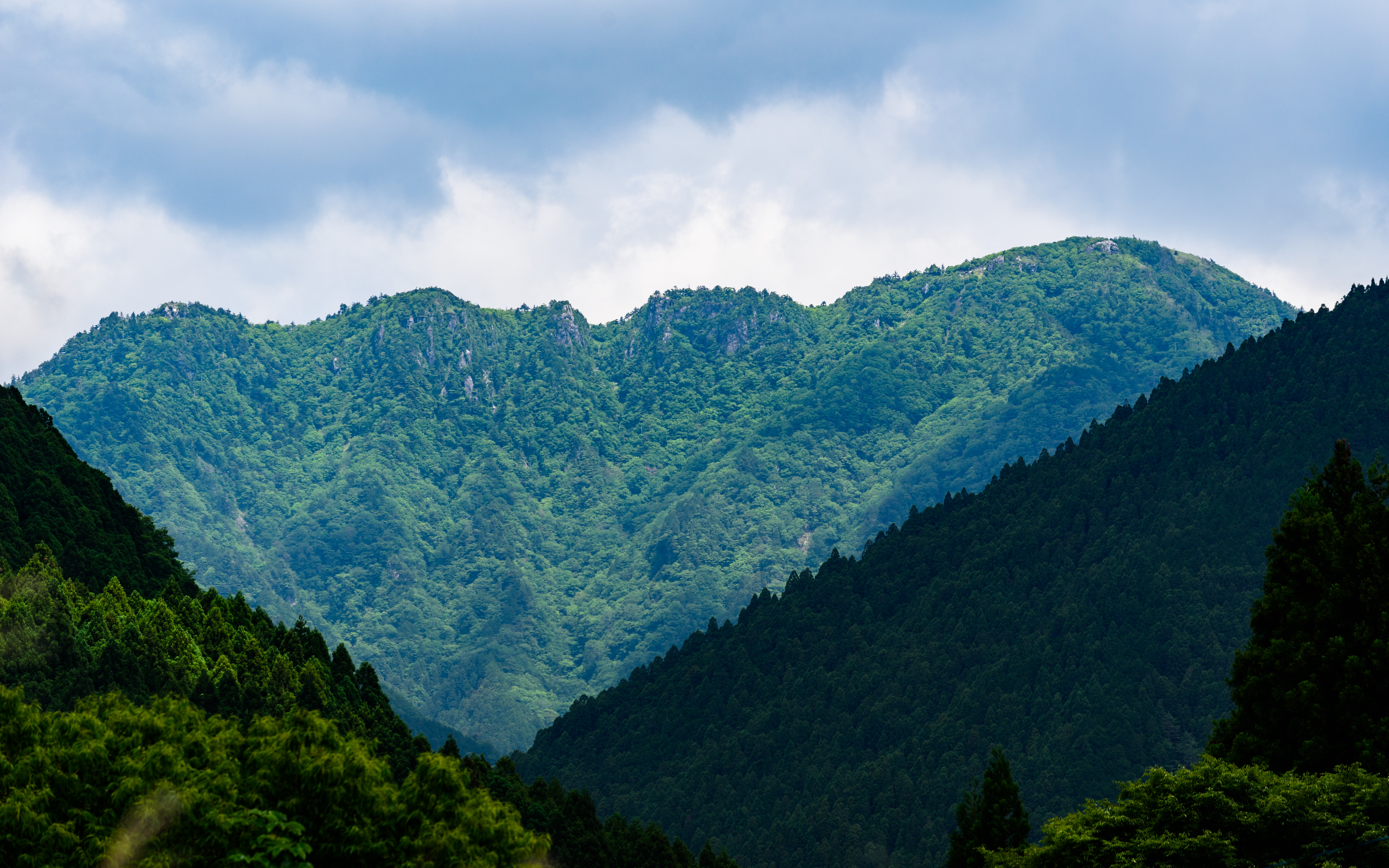

Highest point
- Elevation: 1,719 m (5,640 ft)
- Coordinates: 34°15′10″N 135°56′26″E

Geography
- Location within Japan
- Location: Tenkawa, Nara Prefecture, Japan

Climbing
- Easiest route: Hike

Mount Ōmine (大峰山, Ōmine-san), is a sacred mountain in Nara, Japan, famous for its three tests of courage.

Officially known as Mount Sanjō (山上ヶ岳, Sanjō-ga-take), it is more popularly known as Mount Ōmine due to its prominence in the Ōmine mountain range. It is located in Yoshino-Kumano National Park in the Kansai region, Honshū, Japan.

The temple Ōminesanji, located at the top of the mountain, is the headquarters of the Shugendō sect of Japanese Buddhism and the entire mountain is part of a pilgrimage and training ground for the Yamabushi (山伏, one who prostrates oneself on the mountain).

== History ==
The monastery at Mount Ōmine was founded in the 8th century by En no Gyōja, as a home for his new religion of Shugendō. Shugendo literally means "the path of training and testing," and is based on the self-actualization of spiritual power in experiential form through challenging and rigorous ritualistic tests of courage and devotion known as shugyō.

During the Meiji period, in 1872 the imperial government forbade all "superstitious practices" including belief in folkloric creatures such as Yōkai and Yūrei, as well as gender bans on sacred mountains such as Mount Fuji and all of the rituals of Mount Ōmine. During this time the mountain was closed, and any Shugendo practices were carried on in secret. However, in 1945 the Japanese Culture Act repealed these edicts, and the mountain was opened again. Shugendō practicers were quick to reclaim the mountain and restore the traditions.

In 1964, Mountaineer/author Kyūya Fukada selected Mount Ōmine as number 91 of his 100 famous mountains in Japan. Fukuda's three criteria for the selection of 100 celebrated mountains was their physical grandeur, historical and spiritual significance to Japan, and its individuality, meaning it must have a unique shape, phenomenon or event associated with it. In 1980 an area of 36,000 ha in the region of Mount Ōmine and Mount Ōdaigahara was designated a UNESCO Man and the Biosphere Reserve.

In 2004, it was designated as an UNESCO World Heritage Site, as part of the "Sacred Sites and Pilgrimage Routes in the Kii Mountain Range".

== Ban on women ==
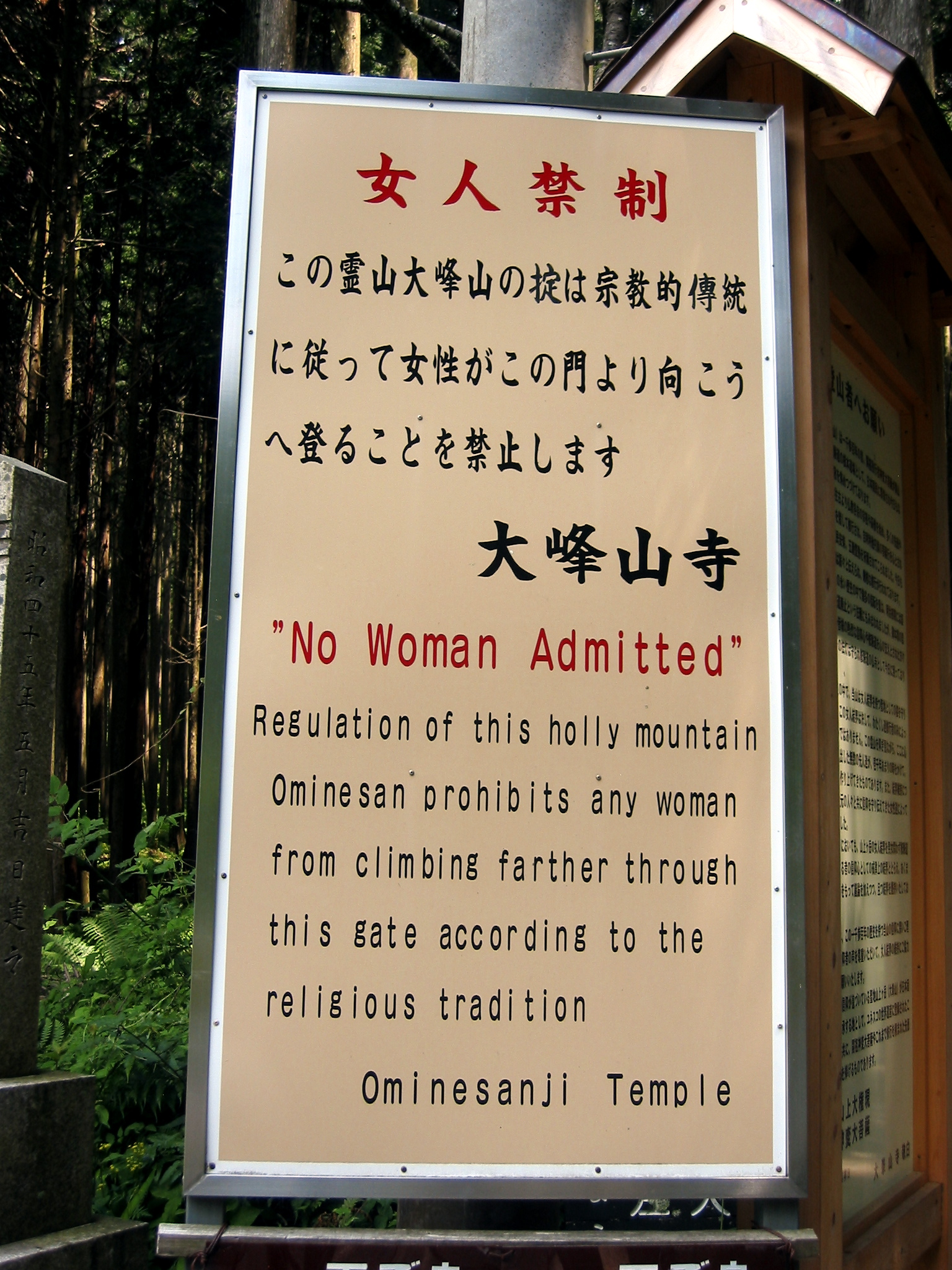
A sign announcing the prohibition of women climbers

Mount Ōmine lays claim to a continuous 1300-year legacy as a male-access-only sacred peak. A thirteen-foot-tall stone pillar reading "From here [onward] is the zone restricted to women" (從是女人結界) stands at the main trailhead to the Sanjōgatake 山上ヶ岳 peak of the mountain. Accompanying it is a roughly eleven-foot-tall wooden gate topped by metal spikes that bears the words "Zone restricted to women gate" (女人結界門). Before both gate and stone pillar, a signboard roughly six feet tall and three feet wide has been erected, stating in English and Japanese, "'No Woman Admitted': Regulation of this holly [sic] mountain Ominesan prohibits any woman from climbing farther through this gate according to the religious tradition."

These inscriptions demonstrate the practice of religion-based female taboos, a widespread cultural phenomenon in Japan. Most territorial proscriptions dissolved in 1872 when the Meiji government granted women full access to mountain shrine and temple lands, but traces of gender-exclusive practices can be found at many mountains in Japan, especially those like Mount Ōmine which powerful Buddhist temples controlled.

The origins and early development of fixed male-only zones (nyonin kinsei; nyonin kekkai) remain a subject of debate, owing to a disjuncture between religious narratives, historical and material records, and present-day practices. Extant textual records indicate that communities of celibate male Buddhist practitioners at places like Mt. Hiei and Mt. Kōya began implementing exclusionary measures from around the tenth century.

The rise of spatial proscriptions aimed at permanently ridding women from the putative pure spaces inhabited by male devotees and the divinities strengthened the association between women and the impure or polluted. Scholars debate the precise pathways through which temporary avoidances gave way to permanent bans, but they share a broad consensus that the phenomenon of women's exclusion derives at least in part—and in no small part—from Buddhist- and kami-related views of women's physiology as innately polluted.

Author Edwin Bernbaum, who holds a PhD in Asian Studies from the University of California, Berkeley, says that the religious leaders in Japan banned women from Omine because they were a distraction to their ascetic practices. A 1960 TIME story expands on Bernbaum's notion:

Said 75-year-old Abbot Kaigyoku Okada: "Can a man meditate on the Buddha in the midst of passing geishas? That is why we sought mountain solitude. But now girls are to be allowed on our mountain, presumably with their boyfriends. If one of my priests doing a cliff exercise happens to see a young couple, he may lose his balance and be killed." The abbot may have been thinking of a line popular with the mountain priests: "Woman is the root of disaster that even 500 reincarnations cannot absolve."

The ban has been challenged many times but without success. Supporters claim that sexual segregation does not equal sexual discrimination. Supporters also state that the ban has an unbroken, 1,300-year tradition. Mount Ōmine's designation as a World Heritage site by UNESCO in 2004 was seen by critics of the ban to have given the gender ban a stamp of approval. Mount Athos in Greece, an Orthodox Christian site, maintains a similar female taboo which extends to women as well as female animals.

== Tests of courage ==
There are three shugyō on Mount Ōmine, each said to strengthen the spiritual power of the challenger. Climbers not wishing to take the tests can easily walk around them.

- Byodo Iwa: The Rock of Equality is only available by special request. It is a rock tower, overlooking a deep cliff. Several projections from the wall allow individuals to cross over to the other side.
- Kanekake Iwa: The Hanging Stone, also known as the Crab Rock due to the position one must take when ascending, is a roughly 30-foot cliff, most of which is easily climbable. However, at the top there is an overhanging rock. To climb the rock, one must swing out over the overhang, using an embedded length of chain to ascend.
- Nishi no Nozoki: The Insight from the West is a sheer cliff, roughly 60 metres high. Novices are held head-first over the cliff, where they are compelled to admit their faults and promise to follow the social and religious laws.

== Gallery ==
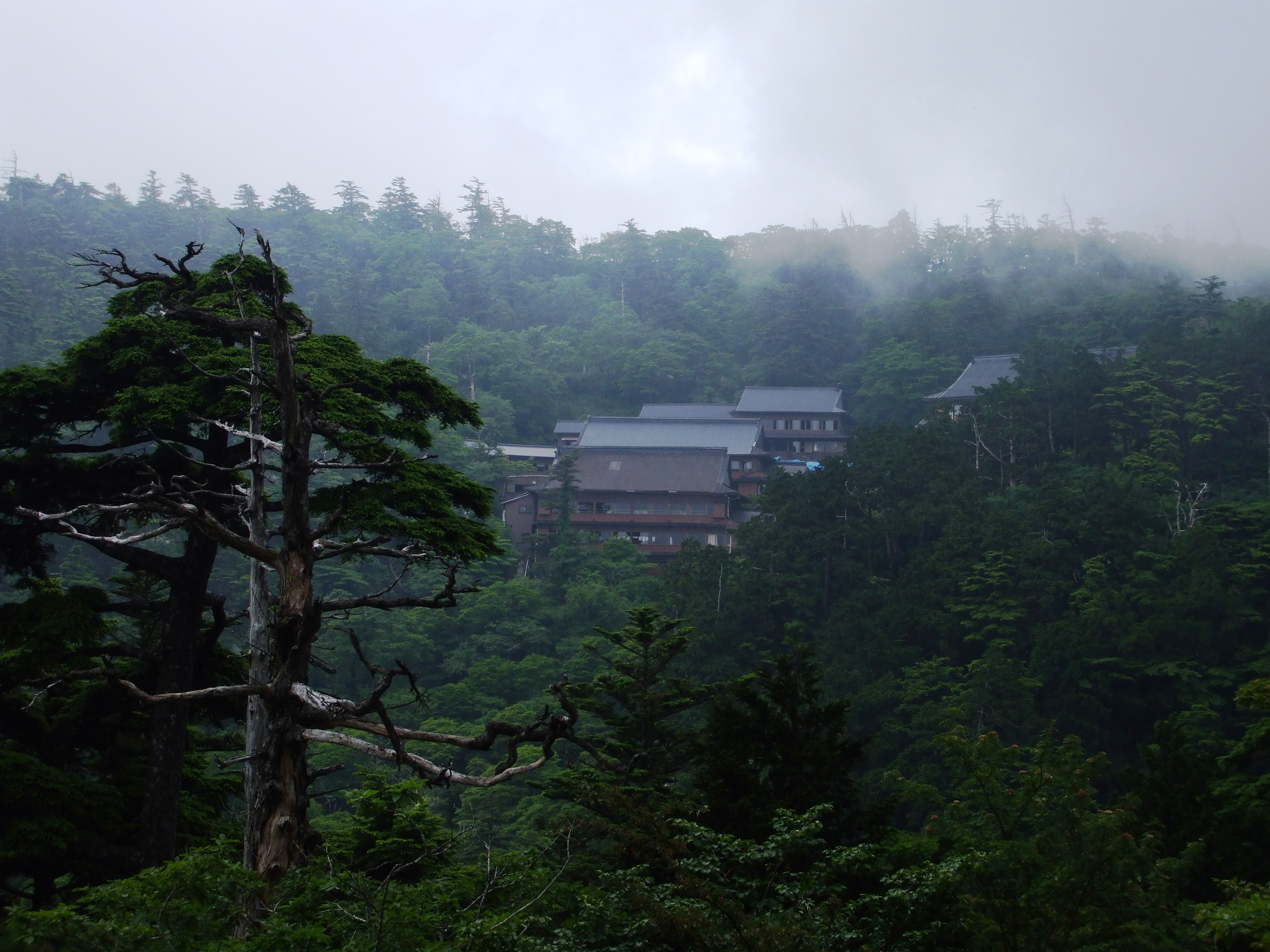
A hospice of Ōminesanji Temple

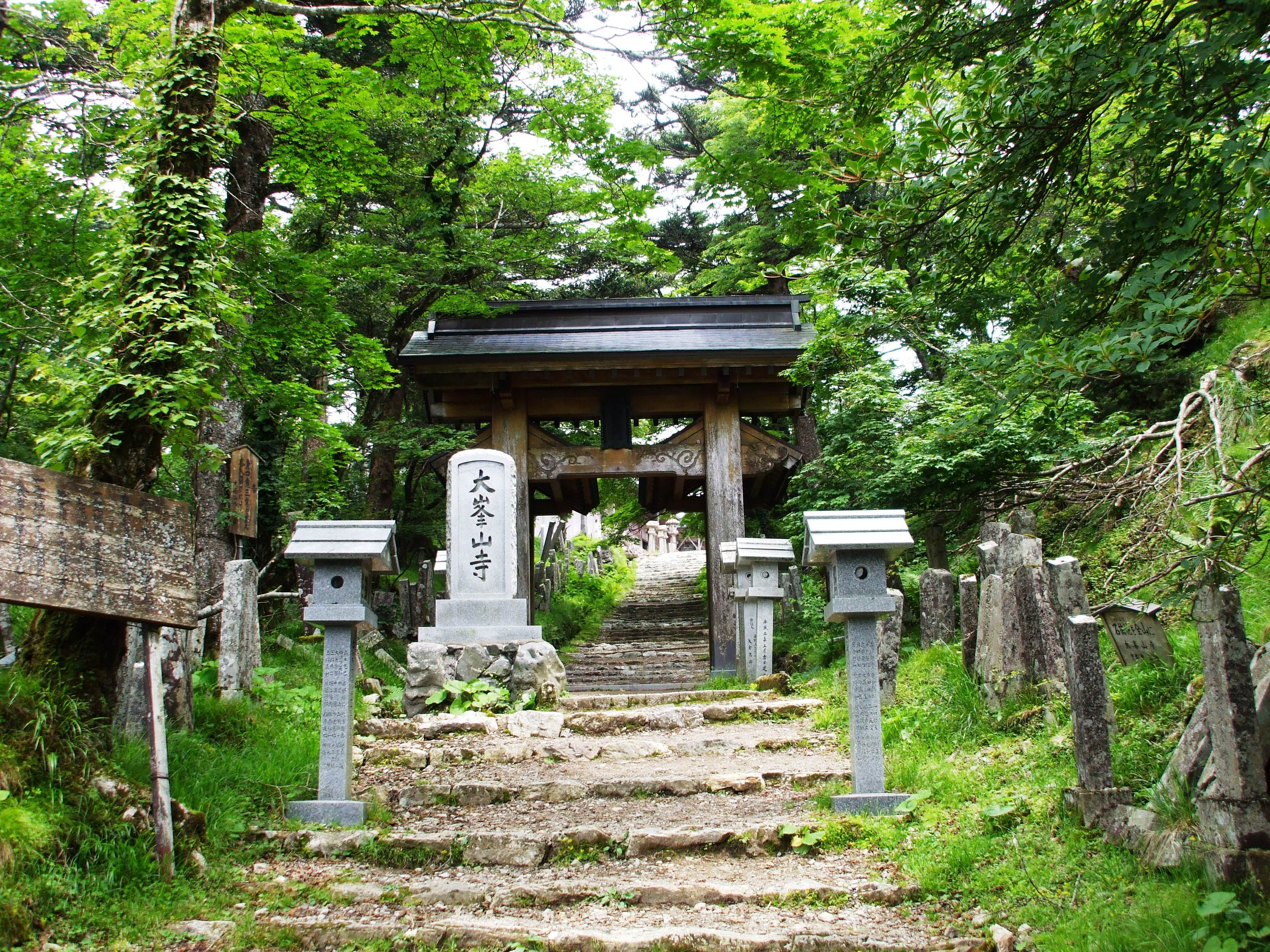
The main gate of Ōminesanji Temple

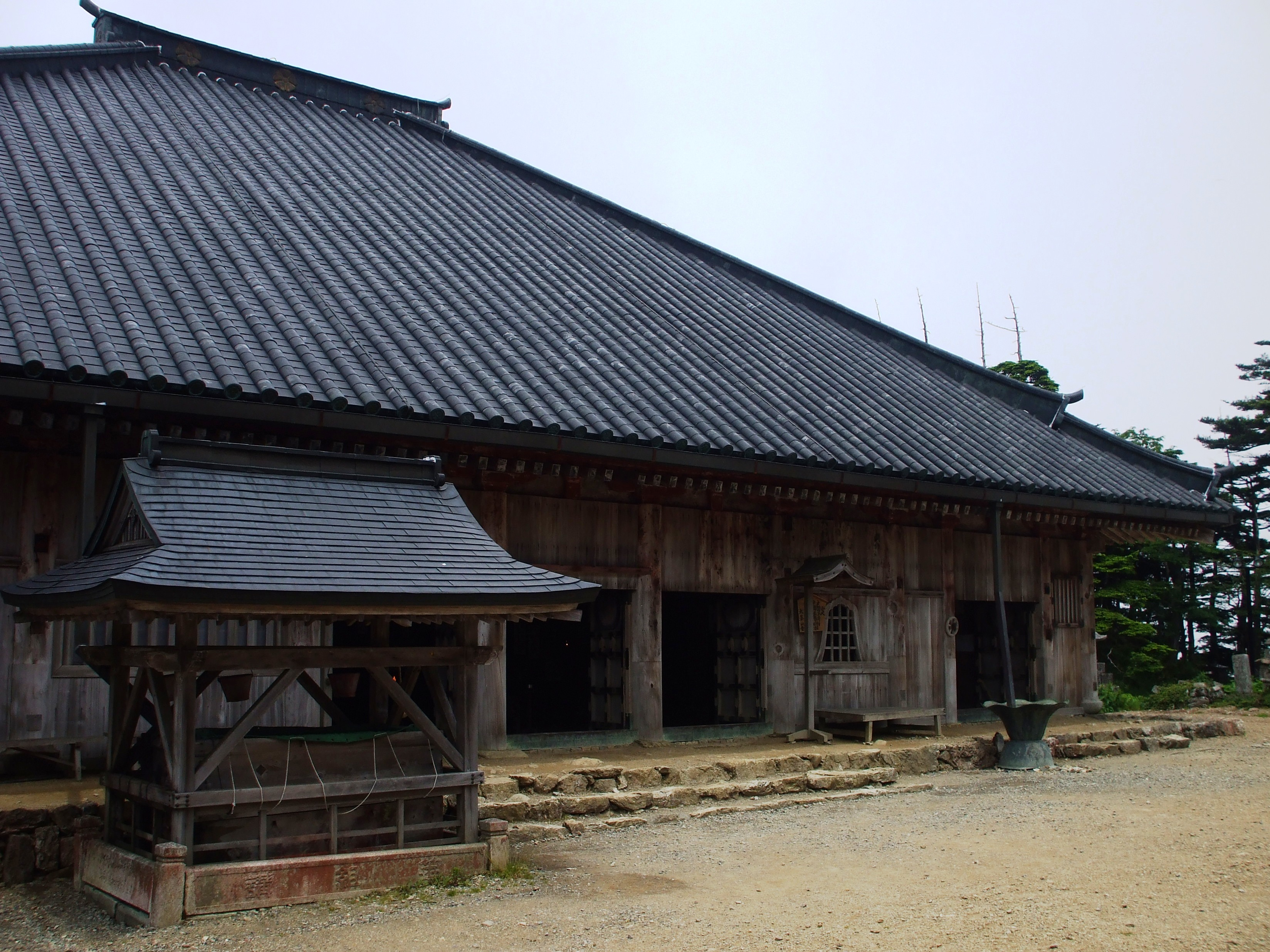
The main building of Ōminesanji Temple

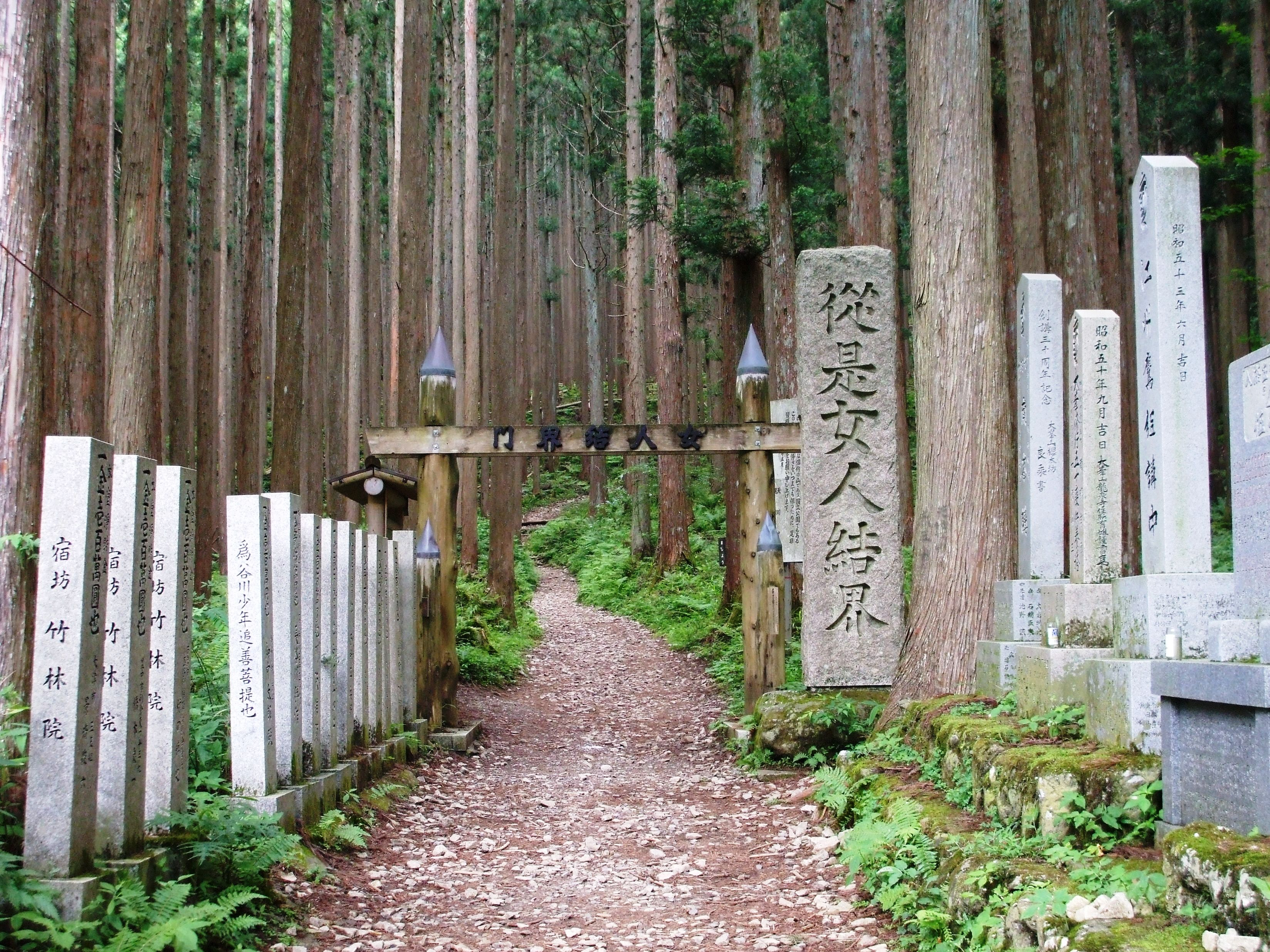
An entrance of a route to Ōminesanji Temple

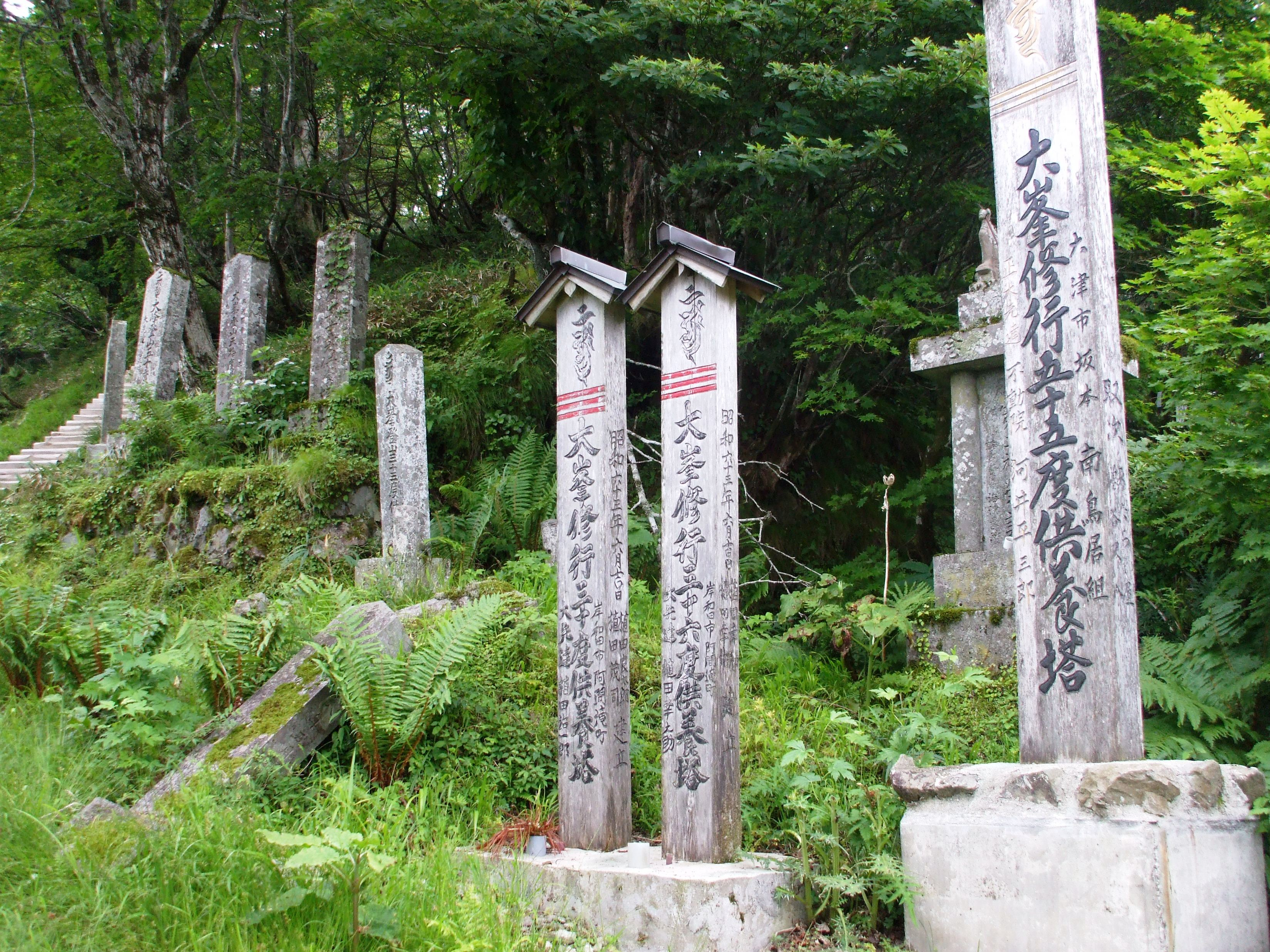
Religious objects on a way to Ōminesanji Temple

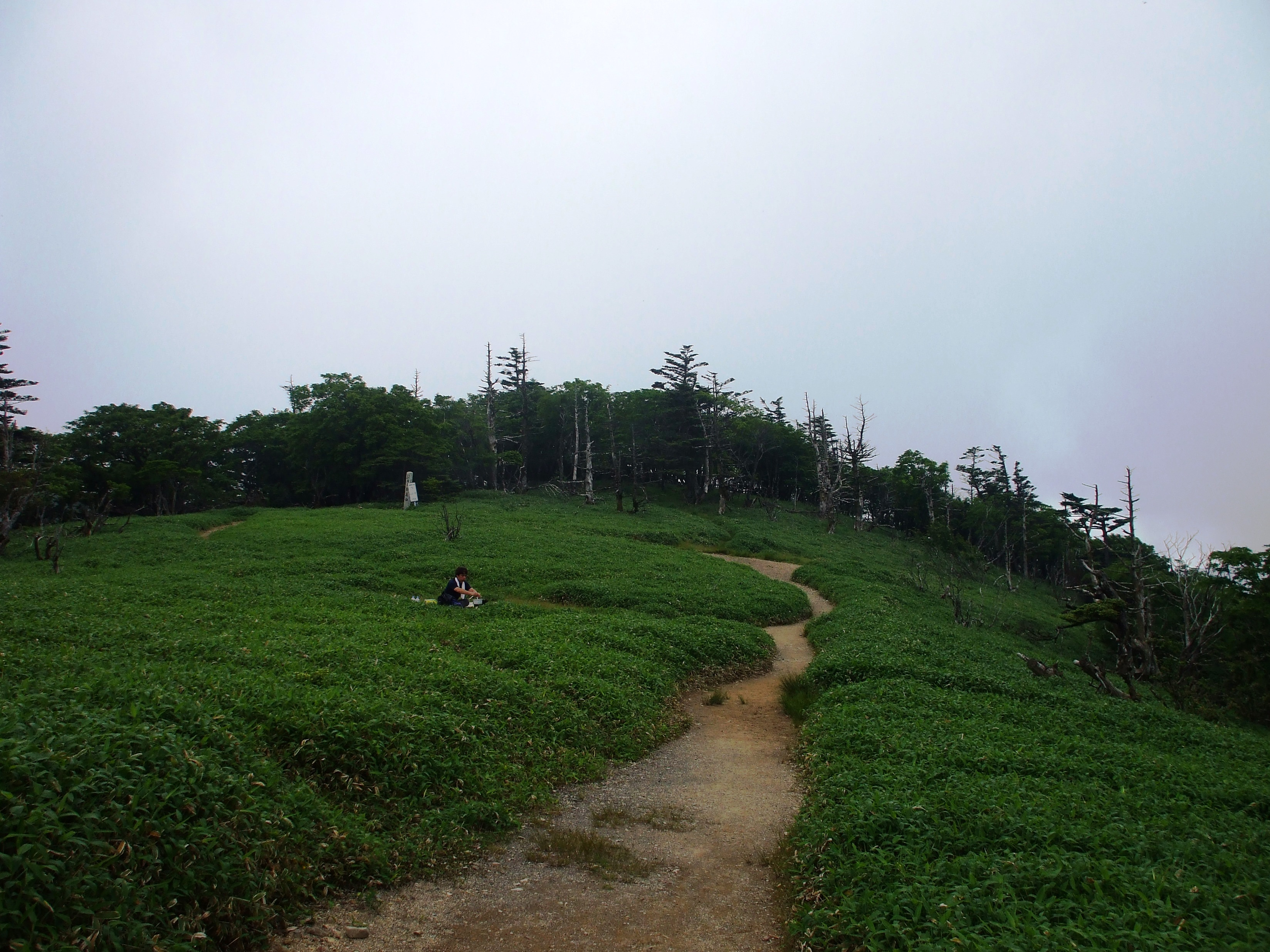
The top of Mount Sanjō

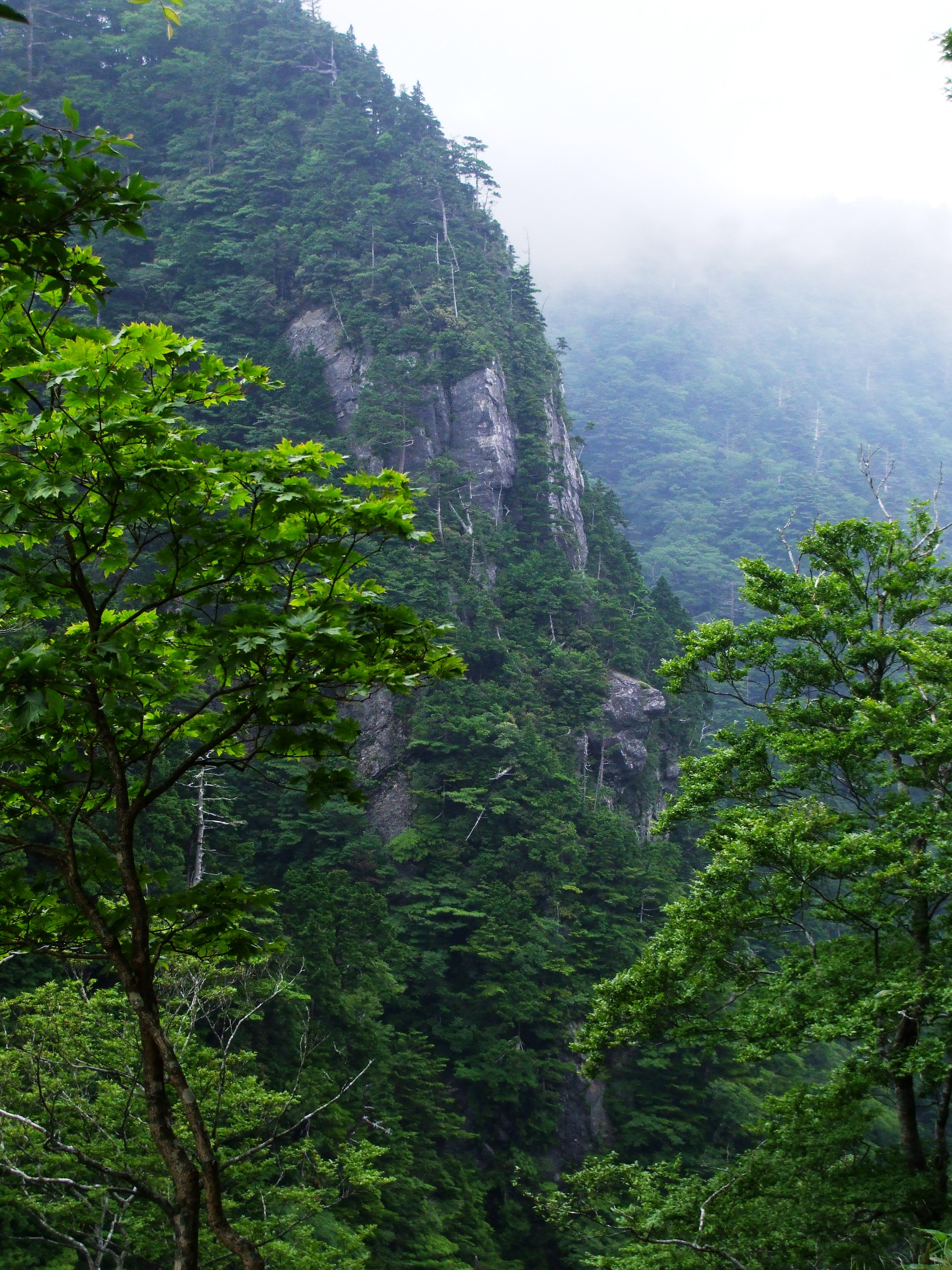
A stone wall of Mount Sanjō

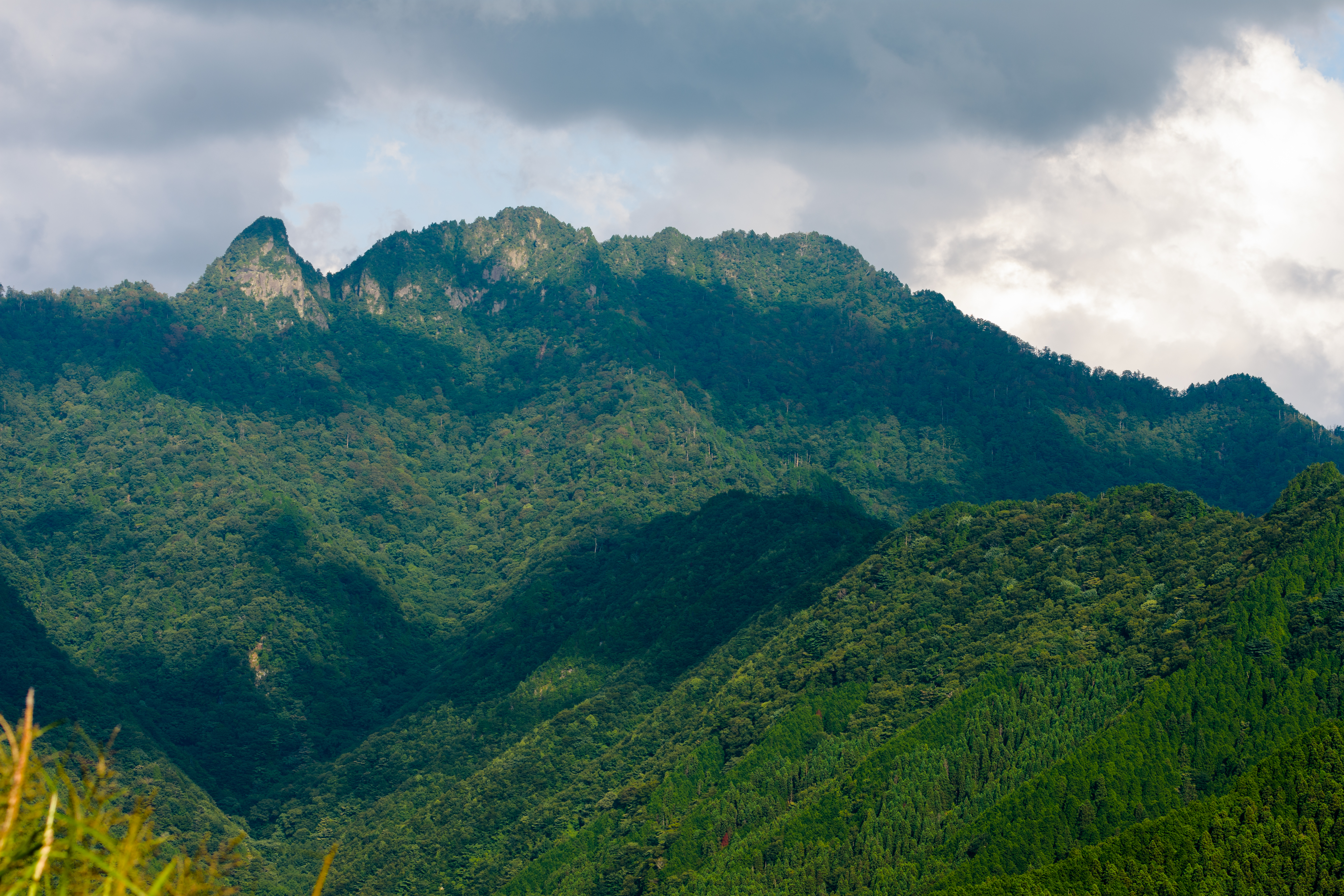
Mount Inamura (Nara)

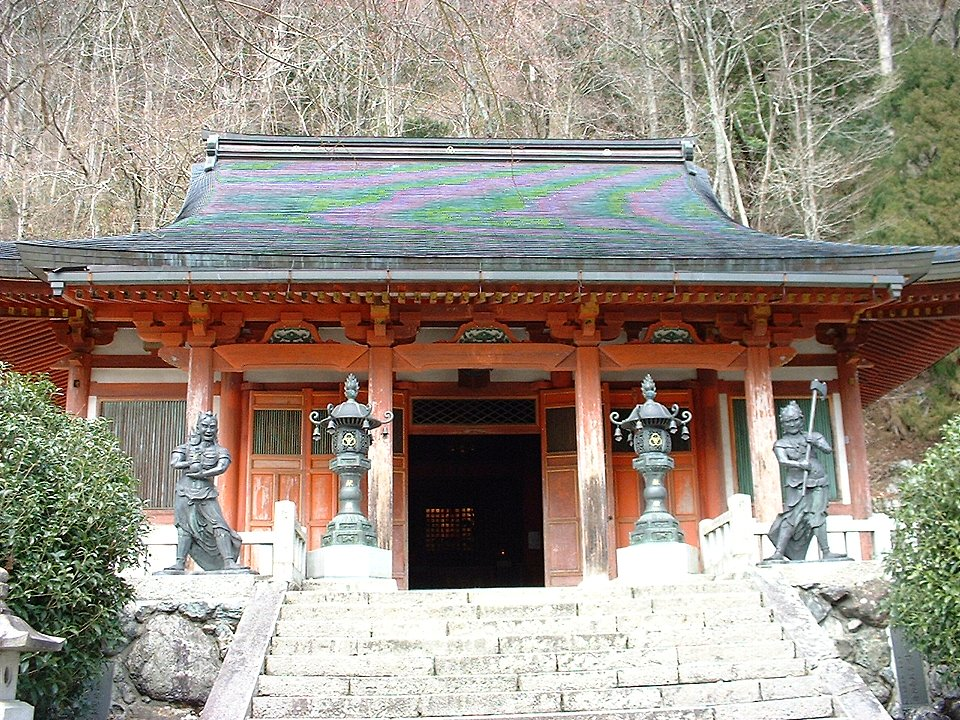
The main building of Ryūsenji Temple
