= Kii =

Kii or KII can refer to:

== People, figures, characters ==
- Kiʻi, a religious image and first man in Hawaiian religion
- Yūshi Naishinnō-ke no Kii, or Lady Kii of Princess Yūshi's Household, a poet and noblewoman in the Heian period
- Takashi Kii (born 1973), Japanese politician
- Kii Kitano (born 1991), a Japanese gravure idol and actress
- Kii Arens (born 1967), an American pop artist

== Groups, organizations ==
- Kii House, a branch family of the Tokugawa clan that ruled Japan during the Edo period
- Kalitta Charters, ICAO airline code
- Kii Corporation, a mobile cloud services company (MBaaS)

== Places ==
- Kii Castle, an ancient castle on Mt. Kizan in Japan
- Kii Channel, a strait separating Honshū and Shikoku islands of Japan.
- Kii Domain, a feudal domain in Kii Province of Japan
- Kii Mountains, a mountain range in the Kansai region of Japan.
- Kii Province, a former province of Japan.
- Kii Peninsula, a peninsula in the Kansai region of Japan.
- Spaceport Kii, Kushimoto, Wakayama, Japan

=== Islands ===
- Kii Island, Onega Bay, White Sea, Arctic Ocean; an island in Onega, Arkangelsk Oblast, Russia
- Kii Ōshima, an island off Shiono Point, the tip of the Kii Peninsula, in Japan

=== Train stations ===
- Kii Station, a train station in Wakayama, Wakayama Prefecture, Japan
- Kii-Arita Station, a train station in Kushimoto, Higashimuro District, Wakayama Prefecture, Japan
- Kii-Gobō Station, a train station in Gobō, Wakayama Prefecture, Japan
- Kii-Hiki Station, a train station in Shirahama, Nishimuro District, Wakayama Prefecture, Japan
- Kii-Hime Station, a train station in Kushimoto, Higashimuro District, Wakayama Prefecture, Japan
- Kii-Hosokawa Station, a train station in Kōya, Ito District, Wakayama Prefecture, Japan
- Kii-Ichigi Station, a train station in Mihama, Minamimuro District, Mie Prefecture, Japan
- Kii-Ida Station, a train station in Kihō, Minamimuro District, Mie Prefecture, Japan
- Kii-Ida Station, a train station in Kihō, Minamimuro District, Mie Prefecture, Japan
- Kii-Kamiya Station, a train station in Kōya, Ito District, Wakayama Prefecture, Japan
- Kii-Katsuura Station, a train station in Nachikatsuura, Higashimuro District, Wakayama Prefecture
- Kii-Miyahara Station, a train station in Arida, Wakayama Prefecture, Japan
- Kii-Nagashima Station, a train station in Kihoku, Kitamuro District, Mie Prefecture, Japan
- Kii-Nakanoshima Station, a train station in Wakayama, Wakayama Prefecture, Japan
- Kii-Ogura Station, a train station in Wakayama, Wakayama Prefecture, Japan
- Kii-Sano Station, a train station in Shingū, Wakayama Prefecture, Japan
- Kii-Shimizu Station, a train station in Hashimoto, Wakayama Prefecture, Japan
- Kii-Shinjō Station, a train station in Tanabe, Wakayama Prefecture, Japan
- Kii-Tahara Station, a train station in Kushimoto, Higashimuro District, Wakayama Prefecture, Japan
- Kii-Tanabe Station, a train station in Tanabe, Wakayama Prefecture, Japan
- Kii-Temma Station, a train station in Nachikatsuura, Higashimuro District, Wakayama Prefecture, Japan
- Kii-Tonda Station, a train station in Shirahama, Nishimuro District, Wakayama Prefecture, Japan
- Kii-Uchihara Station, a train station in Hidaka, Hidaka District, Wakayama Prefecture, Japan
- Kii-Uragami Station, a train station in Nachikatsuura, Higashimuro District, Wakayama Prefecture, Japan
- Kii-Yamada Station, a train station in Hashimoto, Wakayama Prefecture, Japan
- Kii-Yura Station, a train station in Yura, Hidaka District, Wakayama Prefecture, Japan

== Other ==
- Kii-class battleship, a proposed class of Japanese battleships
- Kii Channel HVDC system, a submarine cable high voltage direct current transmission system
- Kitsai language (ISO 639 language code kii), an extinct North American language

== See also ==
- Kii Hunter—see Key Hunter (a former prime-time television detective series in Japan)
- K2 (disambiguation)
- KI2 (disambiguation)
- KI (disambiguation)
