= Tsubaki Station =

Railway station in Shirahama, Wakayama Prefecture, Japan

Tsubaki Station 椿駅
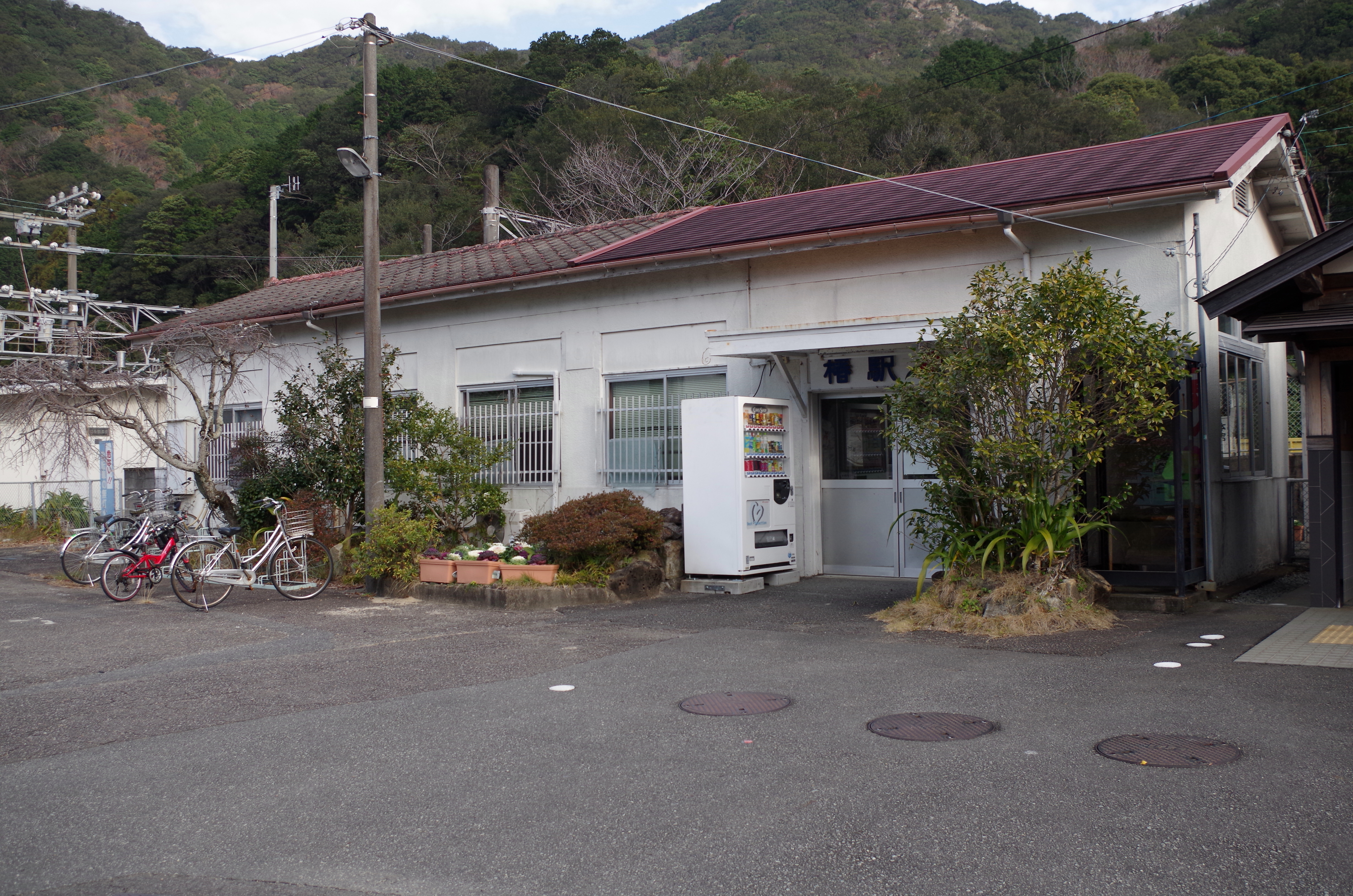
- Tsubaki Station in 2016

General information
- Location: 330-4, Tsubaki, Shirahama-cho, Nishimuro-gun, Wakayama-ken 649-2326; Japan
- Coordinates: 33°36′35.42″N 135°24′13.76″E
- System: JR-West commuter rail station
- Owner: West Japan Railway Company
- Operator: West Japan Railway Company
- Line: W Kisei Main Line (Kinokuni Line)
- Distance: 267.3 km (166.1 miles) from Kameyama; 87.1 km (54.1 miles) from Shingū
- Platforms: 1 side + 1 island platform
- Tracks: 2
- Train operators: West Japan Railway Company

Construction
- Structure type: At grade
- Accessible: None

Other information
- Status: Unstaffed
- Website: Official website

History
- Opened: 29 March 1935
- Electrified: 1978
- Former names: Kii-Tsubaki (1935 - 1965)

Passengers
- FY2019: 15 daily
Services
| Preceding station | JR-West | Following station |
W Kisei Main Line (Kinokuni Line)
| Kii-Hiki; Toward Kushimoto, Kii-Katsuura and Shingū | Local | Kii-Tonda; Toward Kii-Tanabe and Wakayama |
Location
- Location within Wakayama Prefecture Location within Japan

Tsubaki Station (椿駅, Tsubaki-eki) is a passenger railway station located in the town of Shirahama, Nishimuro District, Wakayama Prefecture, Japan, operated by West Japan Railway Company (JR West).

== Lines ==
Tsubaki Station is served by the Kisei Main Line (Kinokuni Line), and is located 267.3 kilometers from the terminus of the line at Kameyama Station and 87.1 kilometers from Shingū.

== Station layout ==
The station consists of one side platform and one island platform connected to the station building by a footbridge; however, one side of the island platform is not in use. The station is unattended.

=== Platforms ===
| 1 | ■ W Kisei Main Line (Kinokuni Line) | for Shirahama and Wakayama |
| 2 | ■ W Kisei Main Line (Kinokuni Line) | for Kushimoto, Kii-Katsuura and Shingū |

== Adjacent stations ==
| « | Service | » |
West Japan Railway Company (JR West)
Kisei Main Line
Limited Express Kuroshio: Does not stop at this station
| Kii-Hiki | Local | Kii-Tonda |

== History ==
The station opened on March 29, 1935 as Kii-Tsubaki Station (紀伊椿駅), and was renamed to its present name on March 1, 1965. With the privatization of the Japan National Railways (JNR) on April 1, 1987, the station came under the aegis of the West Japan Railway Company.

== Passenger statistics ==
In fiscal 2019, the station was used by an average of 15 passengers daily (boarding passengers only).

== Surrounding Area ==
The station is located in an isolated rural area on the coast of Shirahama, surrounded by forest, and is a considerable distance from the Tsubaki neighborhood and Tsubaki onsen areas.

== See also ==
- List of railway stations in Japan
