= Kii-Tonda Station =

Railway station in Shirahama, Wakayama Prefecture, Japan

Kii-Tonda 紀伊富田駅
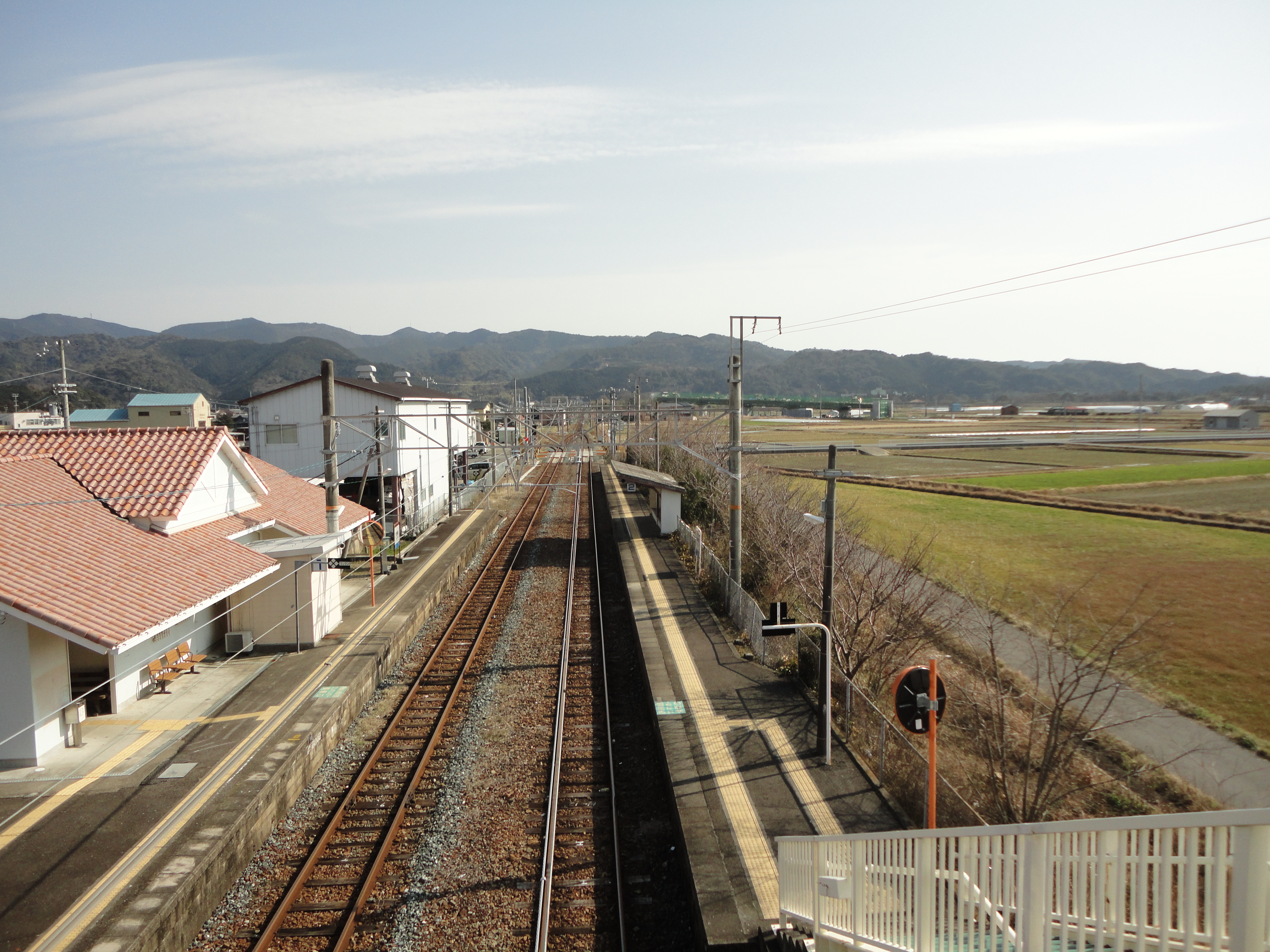
- Kii-Tonda Station (2012)

General information
- Location: 609-2, Sakae, Shirahama-cho, Nishimuro-gun, Wakayama-ken 649-2332; Japan
- Coordinates: 33°39′9.94″N 135°23′36.21″E
- System: JR-West commuter rail station
- Owner: West Japan Railway Company
- Operator: West Japan Railway Company
- Line: W Kisei Main Line (Kinokuni Line)
- Distance: 272.5 km (169.3 miles) from Kameyama; 92.3 km (57.4 miles) from Shingū
- Platforms: 2 side platform
- Tracks: 2
- Train operators: West Japan Railway Company

Construction
- Structure type: At grade
- Accessible: None

Other information
- Status: Unstaffed
- Website: Official website

History
- Opened: 20 December 1933
- Electrified: 1978

Passengers
- FY2019: 47 daily
Services
Preceding station	JR-West	Following station
W Kisei Main Line (Kinokuni Line)
Tsubaki; Toward Susami and Shingū	Local	Shirahama; Toward Kii-Tanabe and Wakayama
Location
- Location within Wakayama Prefecture Location within Japan

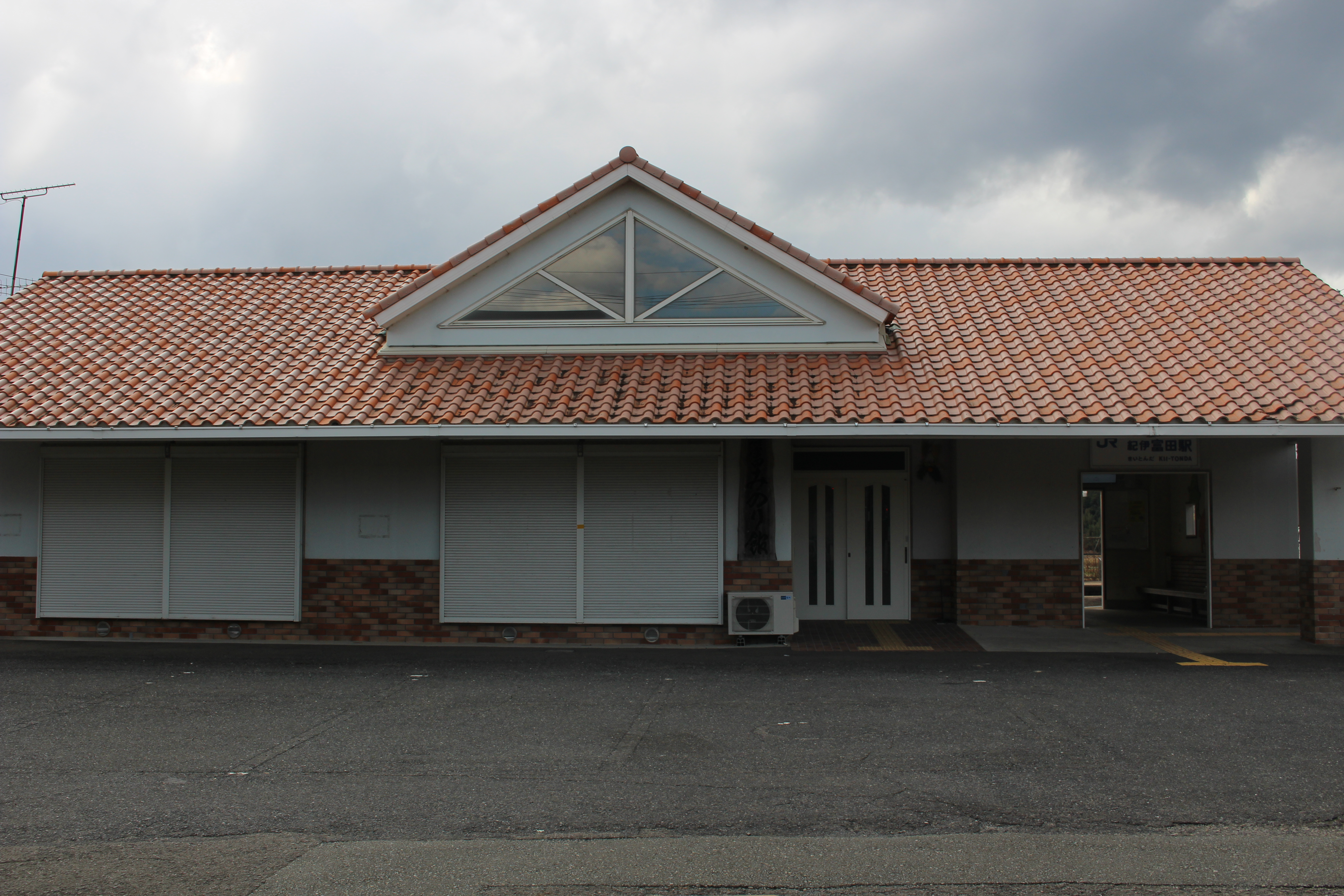
Kii-Tonda Station Building in 2026

Kii-Tonda Station (紀伊富田駅, Kii-Tonda-eki) is a passenger railway station in located in the town of Shirahama, Nishimuro District, Wakayama Prefecture, Japan, operated by West Japan Railway Company (JR West).

== Lines ==
Kii-Tonda Station is served by the Kisei Main Line (Kinokuni Line), and is located 272.5 kilometers from the terminus of the line at Kameyama Station and 92.3 kilometers from Shingū.

== Station layout ==
The station consists of two opposed side platforms connected to the station building by a footbridge. The station is unattended.

=== Platforms ===
1	■ W Kisei Main Line (Kinokuni Line)	for Susami and Shingū
2	■ W Kisei Main Line (Kinokuni Line)	for Shirahama and Wakayama

== Adjacent stations ==
«	Service	»
West Japan Railway Company (JR West)
Kisei Main Line
Limited Express Kuroshio: Does not stop at this station
Tsubaki	Local	Shirahama

== History ==
Kii-Tonda Station opened on December 20, 1933. With the privatization of the Japan National Railways (JNR) on April 1, 1987, the station came under the aegis of the West Japan Railway Company.

== Passenger statistics ==
In fiscal 2019, the station was used by an average of 47 passengers daily (boarding passengers only).

== Surrounding Area ==
- Tonda River
- Shirahama Municipal Tomita Junior High School
- Shirahama Municipal Minami Shirahama Elementary School

== See also ==
- List of railway stations in Japan
