= Esumi =

Esumi may refer to:

- Makiko Esumi (江角 マキコ, born 1966), Japanese model, actress and writer
- Esumi Station, a railway station in Susami, Nishimuro District, Wakayama Prefecture, Japan
