= Kii-Shinjō Station =

Railway station in Tanabe, Wakayama Prefecture, Japan

Kii-Shinjō Station 紀伊新庄駅
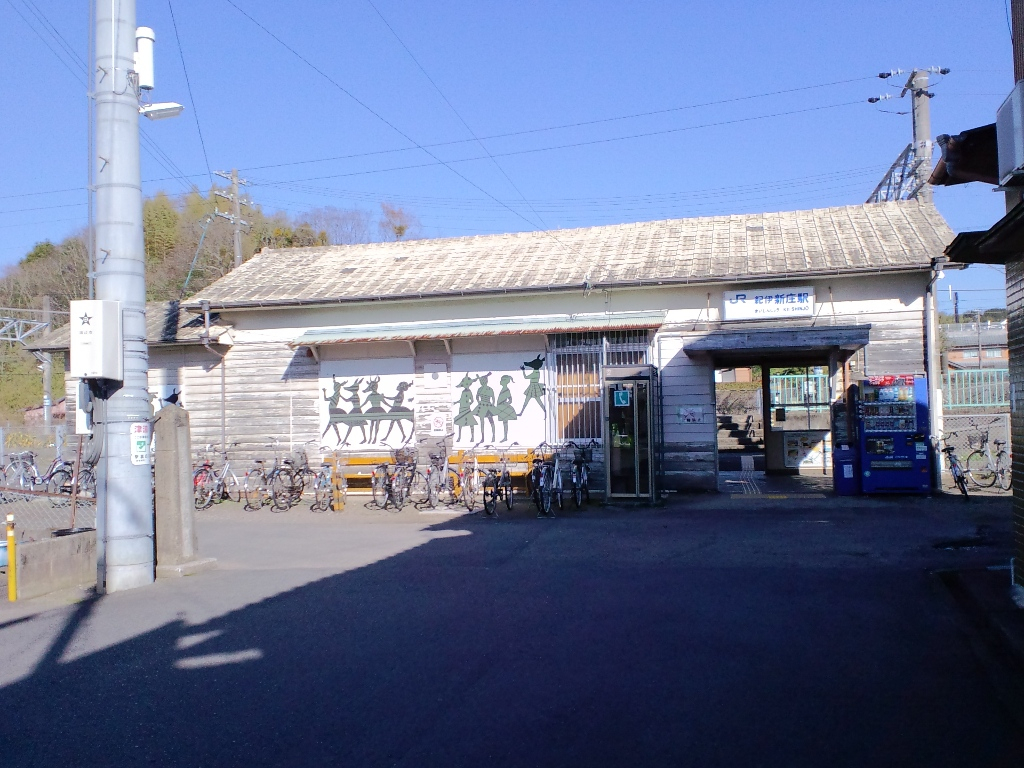
- Kii-Shinjō Station, December 2016

General information
- Location: 472-2, Shinjō-chō, Tanabe-shi, Wakayama-ken 646-0011; Japan
- Coordinates: 33°43′15.85″N 135°24′7.54″E
- System: JR-West commuter rail station
- Owner: West Japan Railway Company
- Operator: West Japan Railway Company
- Line: W Kisei Main Line (Kinokuni Line)
- Distance: 283.2 km (176.0 miles) from Kameyama; 103.0 km (64.0 miles) from Shingū
- Platforms: 2 side platform
- Tracks: 2
- Train operators: West Japan Railway Company

Construction
- Structure type: At grade
- Accessible: None

Other information
- Status: Unstaffed
- Website: Official website

History
- Opened: 20 December 1933
- Electrified: 1978

Passengers
- FY2019: 40 daily
Services
Preceding station	JR-West	Following station
W Kisei Main Line (Kinokuni Line)
Asso; Toward Susami and Shingū	Local	Kii-Tanabe; Toward Kii-Tanabe and Wakayama
Location
- Location within Wakayama Prefecture Location within Japan

Kii-Shinjō Station (紀伊新庄駅, Kii-Shinjō-eki) is a passenger railway station in located in the city of Tanabe, Wakayama Prefecture, Japan, operated by West Japan Railway Company (JR West).

== Lines ==
Kii-Shinjō Station is served by the Kisei Main Line (Kinokuni Line), and is located 283.2 kilometers from the terminus of the line at Kameyama Station and 103.0 kilometers from Shingū.

== Station layout ==
The station consists of two opposed side platforms connected to the station building by a footbridge. The station is unattended.

=== Platforms ===
1	■ W Kisei Main Line (Kinokuni Line)	for Susami and Shingū
2	■ W Kisei Main Line (Kinokuni Line)	for Shirahama and Wakayama

== Adjacent stations ==
«	Service	»
West Japan Railway Company (JR West)
Kisei Main Line
Limited Express Kuroshio: Does not stop at this station
Asso	Local	Kii-Tanabe

== History ==
Kii-Shinjō Station opened on December 20, 1933. With the privatization of the Japan National Railways (JNR) on April 1, 1987, the station came under the aegis of the West Japan Railway Company.

== Passenger statistics ==
In fiscal 2019, the station was used by an average of 40 passengers daily (boarding passengers only).

== Surrounding Area ==
- National Route 42
- Tanabe City Hall Shinjo Liaison Office
- Wakayama Prefectural Tanabe High School
- Wakayama Prefectural Nanki High School
- Wakayama Prefectural Kamishima High School

== See also ==
- List of railway stations in Japan
