= Asso Station =

Railway station in Kamitonda, Wakayama Prefecture, Japan

Asso Station 朝来駅
- Asso Station in March 2026

General information
- Location: 136, Asso, Kamitonda-cho, Nishimuro-gun, Wakayama-ken 649-2105; Japan
- Coordinates: 33°41′46.38″N 135°25′3.33″E
- System: JR-West commuter rail station
- Owner: West Japan Railway Company
- Operator: West Japan Railway Company
- Line: W Kisei Main Line (Kinokuni Line)
- Distance: 279.7 km (173.8 miles) from Kameyama; 99.5 km (61.8 miles) from Shingū
- Platforms: 1 side platform
- Tracks: 2
- Train operators: West Japan Railway Company

Construction
- Structure type: At grade
- Accessible: None

Other information
- Status: Unstaffed
- Website: Official website

History
- Opened: 20 December 1933
- Electrified: 1978

Passengers
- FY2019: 224 daily
Services
Preceding station	JR-West	Following station
W Kisei Main Line (Kinokuni Line)
Shirahama; Toward Susami and Shingū	Local	Kii-Shinjō; Toward Kii-Tanabe and Wakayama
Location
- Location within Wakayama Prefecture Location within Japan

Asso Station (朝来駅, Asso-eki) is a passenger railway station in located in the town of Kamitonda, Nishimuro District, Wakayama Prefecture, Japan, operated by West Japan Railway Company (JR West).

== Lines ==
Asso Station is served by the Kisei Main Line (Kinokuni Line), and is located 279.7 kilometers from the terminus of the line at Kameyama Station and 99.5 kilometers from Shingū.

== Station layout ==
The station consists of one island platform connected to the station building by a level crossing. The station is unattended.

=== Platforms ===
1	■ W Kisei Main Line (Kinokuni Line)	for Susami and Shingū
2	■ W Kisei Main Line (Kinokuni Line)	for Shirahama and Wakayama

== Adjacent stations ==
«	Service	»
West Japan Railway Company (JR West)
Kisei Main Line
Limited Express Kuroshio: Does not stop at this station
Shirahama	Local	Kii-Shinjō

== History ==
Asso Station opened on December 20, 1933. With the privatization of the Japan National Railways (JNR) on April 1, 1987, the station came under the aegis of the West Japan Railway Company.

== Passenger statistics ==
In fiscal 2019, the station was used by an average of 224 passengers daily (boarding passengers only).

== Surrounding Area ==
- Kamitonda Town Hall
- Wakayama Prefectural Kumano High School
- Kamitonda Municipal Kamitonda Junior High School
- Kamitonda Municipal Asso Elementary School
- National Route 42
- National Route 311

== See also ==
- List of railway stations in Japan
