= Nanki–Shirahama Airport =

Airport in Wakayama Prefecture, Japan

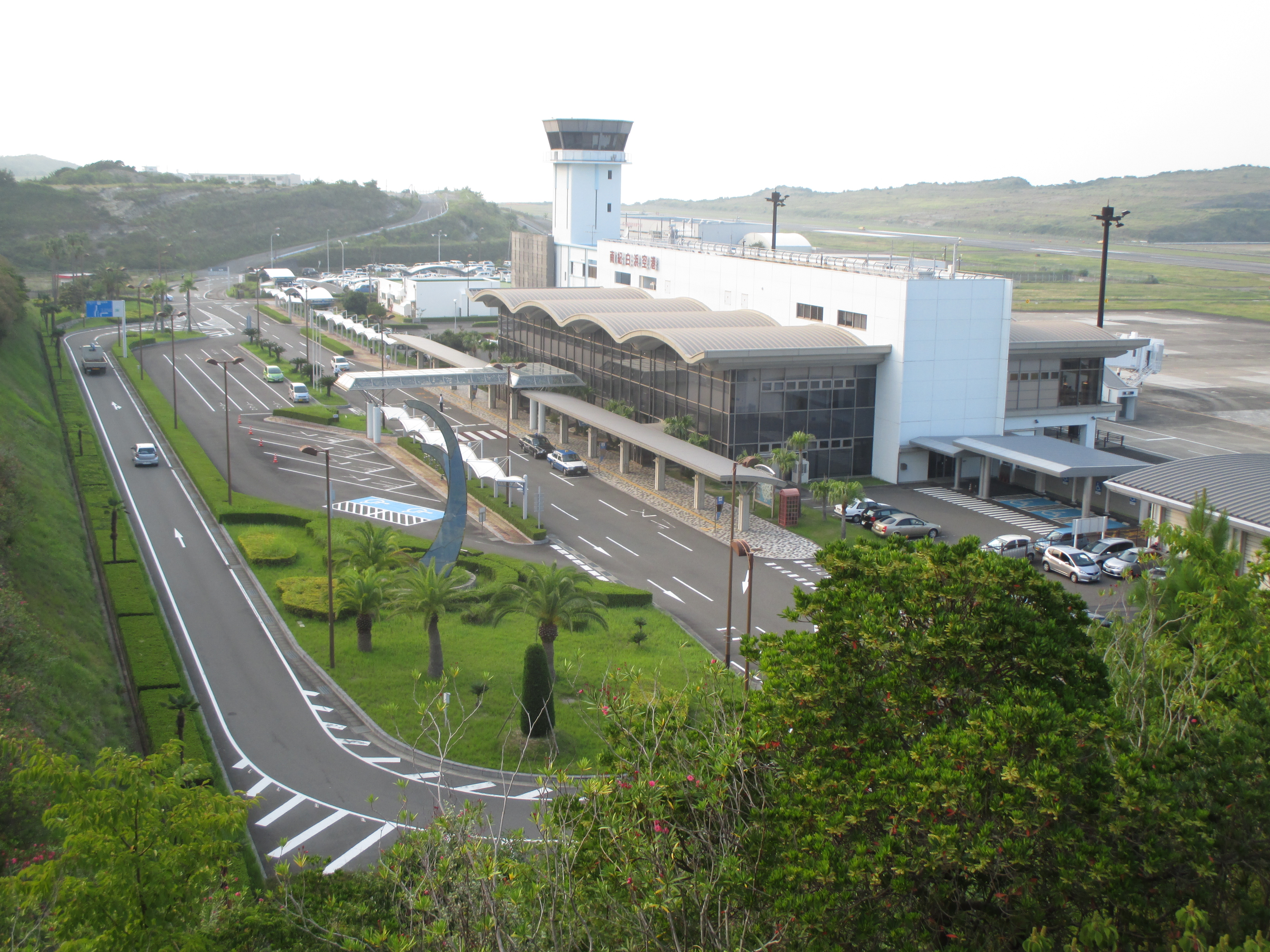
- IATA: SHM; ICAO: RJBD

Summary
- Airport type: Public
- Owner: Wakayama Prefecture
- Operator: Nanki-Shirahama Airport, Inc. (owned by Industrial Growth Platform)
- Location: Shirahama, Wakayama Prefecture, Japan
- Elevation AMSL: 293 ft / 89 m
- Coordinates: 33°39′44″N 135°21′52″E

Map
- Location in Japan SHM/RJBD (Japan)

Runways
Direction	Length		Surface
Direction	m	ft	Surface
15/33	2,000	6,562	Asphalt

Statistics (2015)
- Passengers: 127,472
- Cargo (metric tonnes): 1
- Aircraft movement: 4,631
- Source: Japanese Ministry of Land, Infrastructure, Transport and Tourism

Nanki–Shirahama Airport (南紀白浜空港, Nanki Shirahama Kūkō) (IATA: SHM, ICAO: RJBD) is a third class airport located in the town of Shirahama, Wakayama, Japan. It serves the southern part of the Kii Peninsula with three daily Japan Airlines round-trips to Tokyo–Haneda.

== History ==
Nanki–Shirahama Airport is located in a hilly area about 1.5 kilometers southeast of the center of Shirahama Town, and was established by the Wakayama Prefectural government. It is the only airport in Wakayama prefecture and the southernmost airport in Honshu.The airport opened in April 1968 with a 1200-meter runway. Flights connecting Tokyo, Osaka (Itami) and Nagoya were opened, but subsequently the Osaka and Nagoya flights withdrew. An 1800-meter runway on the eastern adjacent land was completed on March 9, 1996 with the aim of upgrading the capability of the airport to handle jet aircraft. This runway was later extended to 2000 meters.

The airport is located about 65 kilometers south-southeast of the city of Wakayama, which is the administrative and economic center of the prefecture. However, Kansai International Airport, which opened in 1994 is located closer, which had resulted in Nanki-Shirahama Airport being used mostly by tourists visiting Nanki-Shirahama Onsen and locations further south.

The airport is operated by Nanki-Shirahama Airport, Inc., a special purpose company established by Industrial Growth Platform, Inc. and others, from April 1, 2019.

== Airlines and destinations ==
Airlines	Destinations
Japan Airlines	Tokyo–Haneda
