= KI2 =

KI2 may refer to:

== Arts, entertainment, media ==
- Killer Instinct 2, a 1996 videogame
- KI2 file format, used to record shogi matches
- Ki2, a fictional character from Krrish (franchise)

== Places ==
- KI2, Kiruna Station, Kiruna, Sweden; an ESTRACK space tracking station
- Ki2, Aquhorthies, Banchory-Devenick, Aberdeenshire, Scotland, UK; a recumbent stone in a stone circle, see List of recumbent stone circles

== Other uses ==
- Mitsubishi Ki-2, 1930s light bomber warplane

== See also ==
- Kiki (disambiguation)
- KII (disambiguation)
- KI (disambiguation)
