= Shirahama Station =

Railway station in Shirahama, Wakayama Prefecture, Japan

Shirahama Station 白浜駅
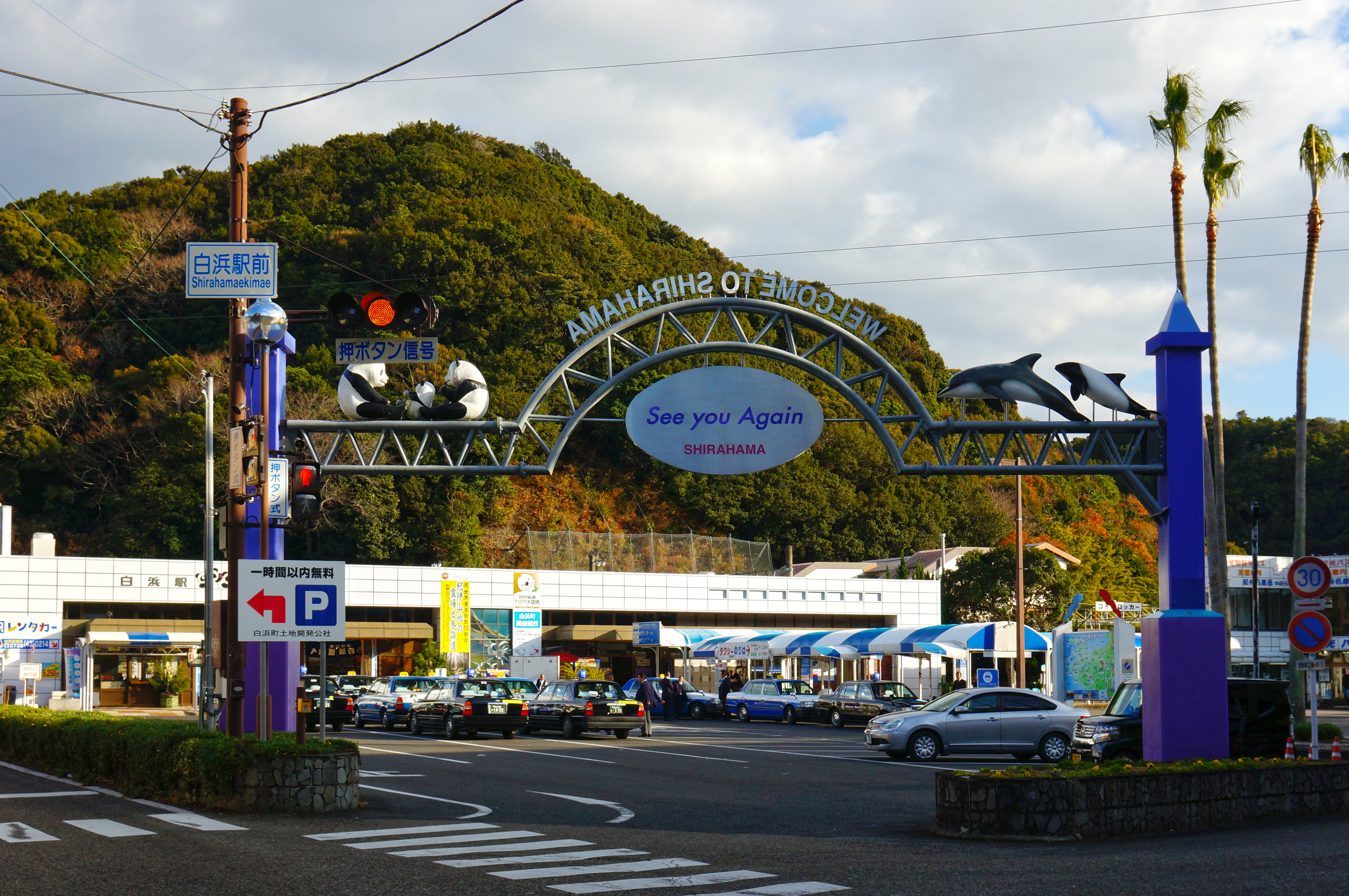
- Shirahama Station in December 2013

General information
- Location: 1475, Katata, Shirahama-cho, Nishimuro-gun, Wakayama-ken 649-2201; Japan
- Coordinates: 33°40′33.06″N 135°23′13.97″E
- System: JR-West commuter rail station
- Owner: West Japan Railway Company
- Operator: West Japan Railway Company
- Line: W Kisei Main Line (Kinokuni Line)
- Distance: 275.4 km (171.1 miles) from Kameyama; 95.2 km (59.2 miles) from Shingū
- Platforms: 1 side + 1 island + 1 bay platform
- Tracks: 4
- Train operators: West Japan Railway Company

Construction
- Structure type: At grade

Other information
- Status: Staffed ( Midori no Madoguchi)
- Website: Official website

History
- Opened: 20 December 1933
- Electrified: 1978
- Former names: Shirahamaguchi (1933 - 1965)

Passengers
- FY2019: 709 daily
Services
Preceding station	JR-West	Following station
W Kisei Main Line (Kinokuni Line)
Kii-Tonda; Toward Kushimoto, Kii-Katsuura and Shingū	Local	Asso; Toward Wakayama, Tennōji, Shin-Ōsaka, and Kyōto
Location
- Location within Wakayama Prefecture Location within Japan

Shirahama Station (白浜駅, Shirahama-eki) is a passenger railway station in located in the town of Shirahama, Nishimuro District, Wakayama Prefecture, Japan, operated by West Japan Railway Company (JR West).

== Lines ==
Shirahama Station is served by the Kisei Main Line (Kinokuni Line), and is located 275.4 kilometers from the terminus of the line at Kameyama Station and 95.2 kilometers from Shingū. Limited express trains named "Kuroshio" stop at this station and part of those return to Shin-Osaka and Kyoto.

== Station layout ==
The station consists of one side platform and one island platform connected to the station building by a footbridge with escalators. The side platform has a cut-out, forming a partial bay platform. The station has a Midori no Madoguchi staffed ticket office.

=== Platforms ===
0	■ Kisei Main Line (Kinokuni Line)	part of limited express trains "Kuroshio" returning for Wakayama, Tennoji, Shin-Osaka and Kyoto
1	■ Kisei Main Line (Kinokuni Line)	for Kii-Tanabe and Wakayama limited express trains "Kuroshio" for Wakayama, Tennoji, Shin-Osaka and Kyoto for Kushimoto, Kii-Katsuura and Shingu
2	■ Kisei Main Line (Kinokuni Line)	for Kushimoto, Kii-Katsuura and Shingū
3	■ Kisei Main Line (Kinokuni Line)	part of limited express trains "Kuroshio" for Wakayama, Tennoji, Shin-Osaka and Kyoto for Kushimoto, Kii-Katsuura and Shingū (only one local train every day)

== Adjacent stations ==
«	Service	»
West Japan Railway Company (JR West)
Kisei Main Line (Kinokuni Line)
Susami (One-way Operation)	West Express Ginga	Kii-Tanabe
Susami	Limited Express Kuroshio	Kii-Tanabe
Kii-Tonda	Local	Asso

== History ==
Shirahama Station opened on December 20, 1933 as Shirahamaguchi Station (白浜口駅). It was renamed to its present name on March 1, 1965. The current station building was completed on October 1, 1985. With the privatization of the Japan National Railways (JNR) on April 1, 1987, the station came under the aegis of the West Japan Railway Company.

== Passenger statistics ==
In fiscal 2019, the station was used by an average of 709 passengers daily (boarding passengers only).

== Surrounding Area ==
- Adventure World
- Kumano Kodo
- Nanki Shirahama Spa

== See also ==
- List of railway stations in Japan
