= Susami =

Susami すさみ町
- Town
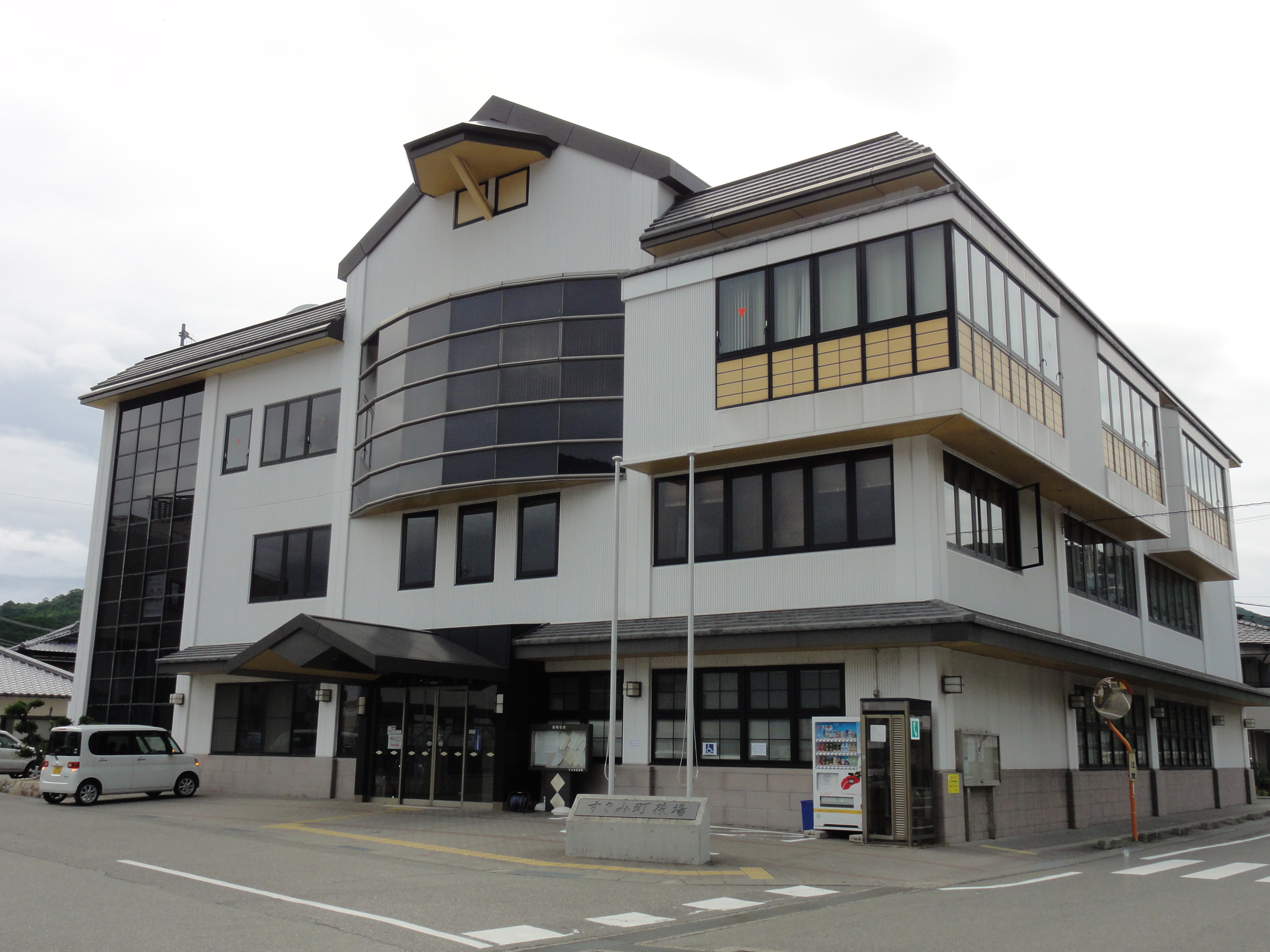
- Susami Town Hall

- Flag

- Location of Susami in Wakayama Prefecture

- Location in Japan
- Coordinates: 33°33′N 135°30′E
- Country: Japan
- Region: Kansai
- Prefecture: Wakayama
- District: Nishimuro

Government
  - Mayor: Tsutomu Iwata (since April 2011)

Area
  - Total: 174.45 km^{2} (67.36 sq mi)

Population (October 31, 2021)
  - Total: 3,709
  - Density: 21.26/km^{2} (55.07/sq mi)
- Time zone: UTC+09:00 (JST)
- City hall address: Susami 4089, Susami Town, Nishi-muro District, Wakayama Prefecture (和歌山県西牟婁郡すさみ町周参見4089号); 649-2621
- Website: Official website
- Symbols
- Bird: Japanese white-eye
- Flower: Crinum asiaticum
- Tree: Castanopsis

Susami (すさみ町, Susami-chō) is a town in Nishimuro District, Wakayama Prefecture, Japan. As of 31 October 2021, the town had an estimated population of 3,709 in 2041 households and a population density of 21 persons per km^{2}. The total area of the town is 174.45 square kilometres (67.36 sq mi).

== Geography ==
Susami is located in the southern portion of Kii Peninsula, and faces the Pacific Ocean to the west. The coastline is a rocky ria coast, with a moderate clime due to the Kuroshio Current just offshore. More than 90% of the town area is occupied by forests, and there is little flat land. The central urban area is at the mouth of the Susami River. Parts of the town are within the limits of the Yoshino-Kumano National Park.

=== Neighboring municipalities ===
Wakayama Prefecture

- Kushimoto
- Kozagawa
- Shirahama

== Climate ==
Susami has a humid subtropical climate (Köppen Cfa) characterized by warm summers and cool winters with light to no snowfall. The average annual temperature in Susami is 16.5 °C. The average annual rainfall is 2395 mm with September as the wettest month. The temperatures are highest on average in August, at around 26.2 °C, and lowest in January, at around 6.9 °C. The area is subject to typhoons in summer.

== Demographics ==
Per Japanese census data, Susami has suffered greatly from rural depopulation, and its current population is less than a quarter of its population in 1950.

Historical population
Year	Pop.	±%
1950	12,150	—
1960	10,704	−11.9%
1970	8,222	−23.2%
1980	7,299	−11.2%
1990	6,309	−13.6%
2000	5,952	−5.7%
2010	4,731	−20.5%

== History ==
The area of the modern town of Susami was within ancient Kii Province. During the Edo period, it was part of the holdings of the Kii Tokugawa clan, who ruled Kishū Domain. After the Meiji restoration, the area became part of Nishimuro District, Wakayama, and the village of Sasami (周参見) was established with the creation of the modern municipalities system on April 1, 1889.Susami was raised to town status on February 11, 1924. On March 31, 1955, Susami annexed the neighboring villages of Samoto and Otsugawa and changed the spelling of its name from kanji to hiragana. The village of Esumi was annexed on March 25, 1959.

== Government ==
Susami has a mayor-council form of government with a directly elected mayor and a unicameral town council of 10 members. Susami, together with the other municipalities in Nishimuro District, contributes three members to the Wakayama Prefectural Assembly. In terms of national politics, the town is part of Wakayama 3rd district of the lower house of the Diet of Japan.

== Economy ==
Commercial fishing, forestry, agriculture and tourism are the core industries of Susami Town. The fishing industry is particularly active due to the effects of the Kuroshio Current and the ria coastline. Bonito, yellowtail, and spiny lobsters are the main catch. being landed. Forestry such as cedar and cypress is traditionally practiced in inland areas, but has stagnated since the mid-1960s due to high costs and low domestic demand. Lettuce cultivation is flourishing in the Ezumi area of the town.

== Education ==
Susami has two public elementary schools and one public middle school operated by the town government. The town does not have a high school.

== Sister relationships ==
- Neyagawa, Japan
- Jezero, Bosnia and Herzegovina

== Transportation ==
=== Railway ===
JR West – Kisei Main Line

- Esumi - Mirozu - Susami

=== Highway ===
- Kisei Expressway
- National Route 42

== Local attractions ==
=== Underwater mailbox ===
Off of the coast of Susami there is an underwater mailbox, which is an officially recognised mail collection point of Susami's postal system. It held the Guinness World Record for the deepest underwater post box, at 10 metres. It is used by divers who write water-resistant messages. It is said that during the busiest times it contains up to 200 pieces of mail a day.

== See also ==
- Sobietoshima, an island, whose name sounds like "Soviet Island" in Japanese
