= Shirahama, Wakayama =

Shirahama 白浜町
- Town
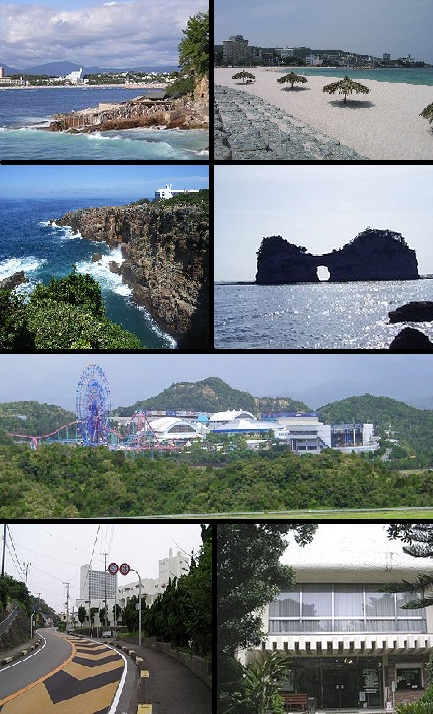
- Top left: Nanki Shirahama Spa, top right: Shirahama Beach, 2nd left: Three-stage Wall (Sandanheki), 2nd right: Engetsu Island (Engetsuto), 3rd: Shirahama Adventure World, bottom left: Tsubaki Spa, bottom right: Minakata Kumagusu Memorial Museum

- Flag Seal

- Location of Shirahama in Wakayama Prefecture

- Location in Japan
- Coordinates: 33°40′54″N 135°20′40″E
- Country: Japan
- Region: Kansai
- Prefecture: Wakayama
- District: Nishimuro

Government
  - Mayor: Yasuhiro Oe

Area
  - Total: 200.98 km^{2} (77.60 sq mi)

Population (October 31, 2021)
  - Total: 20,704
  - Density: 103.02/km^{2} (266.81/sq mi)
- Time zone: UTC+09:00 (JST)
- City hall address: 1600 Shirahama-chō, Wakayama-ken; 649-2211
- Climate: Cfa
- Website: Official website
- Symbols
- Bird: Egret
- Flower: Crinum asiaticum
- Tree: Cherry blossom

Shirahama (白浜町, Shirahama-chō) is a town in Nishimuro District, Wakayama Prefecture, Japan. As of 31 October 2021, the town had an estimated population of 20,704 in 11,024 households and a population density of 100 persons per km^{2}. The total area of the town is 200.98 square kilometres (77.60 sq mi).

== Geography ==
Shirahama is located on the Pacific coast of the Kii Peninsula in the southwestern part of Wakayama prefecture. Many hot springs can be found here, most notably Nanki-Shirahama Onsen.

=== Neighboring municipalities ===
Wakayama Prefecture

- Kamitonda
- Kozagawa
- Susami
- Tanabe

=== Climate ===
Shirahama has a humid subtropical climate (Köppen Cfa) characterized by warm summers and cool winters with light to no snowfall. The average annual temperature in Shirahama is 17.1 °C (62.8 °F). The average annual rainfall is 2,025.1 mm (79.73 in) with July as the wettest month. The temperatures are highest on average in August, at around 27.6 °C (81.7 °F), and lowest in January, at around 7.1 °C (44.8 °F). The area is subject to typhoons in summer.

Climate data for Nanki–Shirahama Airport, Shirahama (2006−2020 normals, extremes 2006−present)
Month	Jan	Feb	Mar	Apr	May	Jun	Jul	Aug	Sep	Oct	Nov	Dec	Year
Record high °C (°F)	19.0 (66.2)	21.8 (71.2)	24.9 (76.8)	26.1 (79.0)	29.7 (85.5)	32.0 (89.6)	36.3 (97.3)	37.5 (99.5)	33.6 (92.5)	30.7 (87.3)	26.2 (79.2)	23.1 (73.6)	37.5 (99.5)
Mean daily maximum °C (°F)	10.7 (51.3)	11.9 (53.4)	15.1 (59.2)	19.1 (66.4)	23.4 (74.1)	25.9 (78.6)	29.3 (84.7)	31.3 (88.3)	28.5 (83.3)	24.0 (75.2)	18.6 (65.5)	13.3 (55.9)	20.9 (69.7)
Daily mean °C (°F)	7.1 (44.8)	7.9 (46.2)	11.0 (51.8)	15.1 (59.2)	19.4 (66.9)	22.5 (72.5)	26.1 (79.0)	27.6 (81.7)	24.7 (76.5)	20.0 (68.0)	14.6 (58.3)	9.5 (49.1)	17.1 (62.8)
Mean daily minimum °C (°F)	3.6 (38.5)	4.0 (39.2)	6.6 (43.9)	10.8 (51.4)	15.4 (59.7)	19.5 (67.1)	23.5 (74.3)	24.7 (76.5)	21.5 (70.7)	16.5 (61.7)	10.8 (51.4)	5.8 (42.4)	13.6 (56.4)
Record low °C (°F)	−3.7 (25.3)	−3.1 (26.4)	−0.1 (31.8)	2.0 (35.6)	7.4 (45.3)	13.4 (56.1)	18.0 (64.4)	18.4 (65.1)	13.7 (56.7)	6.4 (43.5)	3.2 (37.8)	−1.2 (29.8)	−3.7 (25.3)
Average precipitation mm (inches)	60.6 (2.39)	99.9 (3.93)	138.0 (5.43)	136.5 (5.37)	167.0 (6.57)	264.9 (10.43)	279.6 (11.01)	188.3 (7.41)	259.8 (10.23)	231.3 (9.11)	115.3 (4.54)	81.4 (3.20)	2,025.1 (79.73)
Average precipitation days (≥ 1.0 mm)	5.5	7.6	9.3	9.5	9.1	12.7	11.1	7.7	10.8	9.7	7.5	6.1	106.6
Source: Japan Meteorological Agency

== Demographics ==
Per Japanese census data, the population of Shirahama has decreased steadily over the past 50 years.

Historical population
Year	Pop.	±%
1960	25,707	—
1970	26,612	+3.5%
1980	26,002	−2.3%
1990	24,737	−4.9%
2000	24,563	−0.7%
2010	22,697	−7.6%

== History ==
The area of the modern city of Shirahama was within ancient Kii Province. The hot springs in this area have been used since ancient times and are mentioned on several occasions in the Nihon Shoki and throughout the pre-modern period. The seaside of Shirahama was famous for its white quartz sands, which had also been celebrated in poetry as a makurakotoba for "whiteness". These sands were exploited commercially for their high silica content for use in glass production and were also exported. The village of Setokanayama (瀬戸鉛山村, Setokanayama-mura) was established with the creation of then modern municipalities system on April 1, 1889. From 1919, local volunteers began developing the seaside area in competition to the older springs in the mountains and efforts to drill for a hot spring source were successful by 1922. A local commercial shipping company, the Shirahama Onsen Motor Co., Ltd., began promotion of the area as a resort. This received a boost by a visit of Emperor Showa in 1929. The village was promoted to town status on March 1, 1940. The neighboring village of Minami-Tonda was annexed on March 15, 1955, and Nishi-Tonda on July 1, 1958. On March 1, 2006, the town of Hikigawa, from Nishimuro District, was merged into Shirahama.

== Government ==
Shirahama has a mayor-council form of government with a directly elected mayor and a unicameral town council of 14 members. Shirahama, collectively with the other municipalities in Nishimuro District, contributes three members to the Wakayama Prefectural Assembly. In terms of national politics, the town is part of Wakayama 3rd district of the lower house of the Diet of Japan.

== Economy ==
Shirahama is primarily a resort town. After World War II, the area was promoted as a honeymoon resort and as a destination for group tourism from them 1960s. The opening of Nanki Shirahama Adventure World in the 1990s have gradually changed the focus of the resort towards families. Commercial fishing and the raising of hothouse flowers are also contributors to the local economy.

== Education ==
Shirahama has ten public elementary schools and four public middle schools operated by the town government, and one public high school operated by the Wakayama Prefectural Department of Education.

== Transportation ==
=== Railway ===
JR West – Kisei Main Line

- Kii-Hiki - Tsubaki - Kii-Tonda - Shirahama

=== Highway ===
- Kisei Expressway
- National Route 42

=== Airport ===
- Nanki-Shirahama Airport

== Local attractions ==
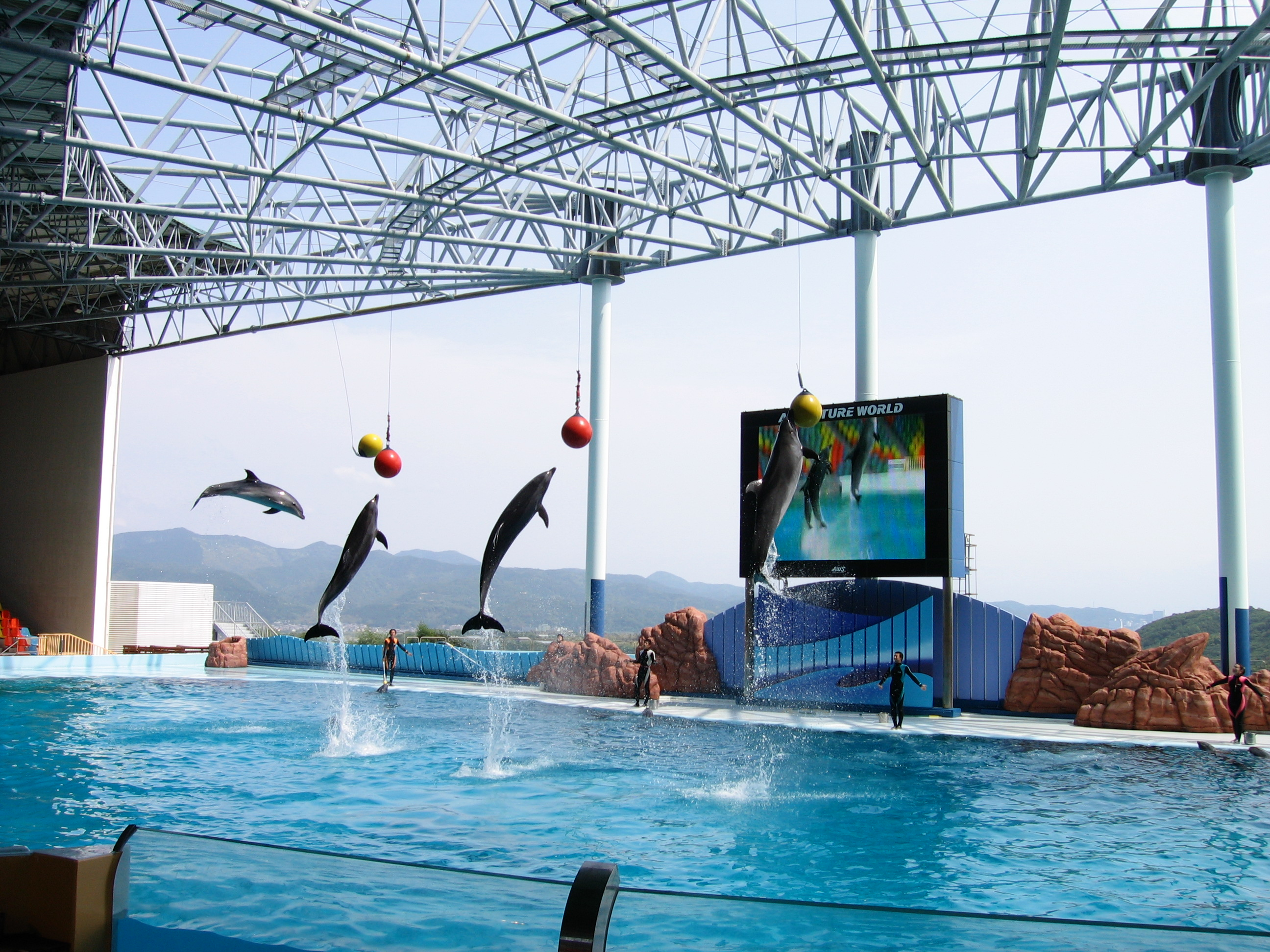
Shirarahama Adventure World theme park

- Adventure World, a mega theme park with a safari park, aquarium and amusement park combined in one facility (ja:アドベンチャーワールド)
- Engetsu-tō: a natural arch just off the coast
- Kumano Kodo: an ancient pilgrimage route across the Kii Peninsula linking several large shrines
- Minakata Kumagusu Museum: houses much of scientist Minakata Kumagusu's books, specimens, and memorabilia
- Sandanbeki (三段壁): Cliffs along on the ocean edge that are 50 meters high. It is said that pirates (kumano suigun) used to inhabit the caverns; the remains of their dwellings can be seen.
- Senjō-jiki (千畳敷): a rocky point near Shirahama Beach

=== White-sand beach ===
One of Shirahama's main attractions is its crescent-shaped white-sand beach; “Shirahama” means “white beach” or “white bay”. In the 1960s, when Shirahama was connected by rail to Osaka, the city became a popular tourist destination, and blocky white hotel towers were erected along the coastal road. The increased development accelerated erosion, and the famous sand began to wash into the sea. Worried that the town of White Beach would lose its white beach, according to a city official, Wakayama Prefecture began in 1989 to import sand from Perth, Australia, 4,700 miles away. 745,000 cubic meters was imported over 15 years.

== Sister cities ==
- Gwacheon, South Korea
- Honolulu, Hawaii, United States (Goodwill Beach City Relationship)

== Notable people ==
- Kazuhiro Mizoguchi, former javelin thrower
