= Kii-Hiki Station =

Railway station in Shirahama, Wakayama Prefecture, Japan

Kii-Hiki Station 紀伊日置駅
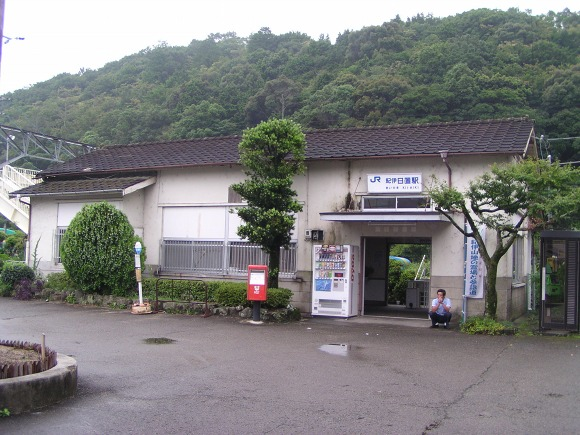
- Kii-Hiki Station, August 2005

General information
- Location: 159, Yata, Shirahama-cho, Nishimuro-gun, Wakayama-ken 649-2522; Japan
- Coordinates: 33°35′6.1″N 135°27′28.89″E
- System: JR-West commuter rail station
- Owner: West Japan Railway Company
- Operator: West Japan Railway Company
- Line: W Kisei Main Line (Kinokuni Line)
- Distance: 261.2 km (162.3 miles) from Kameyama; 81.0 km (50.3 miles) from Shingū
- Platforms: 2 side platform
- Tracks: 2
- Train operators: West Japan Railway Company

Construction
- Structure type: At grade
- Accessible: None

Other information
- Status: Unstaffed
- Website: Official website

History
- Opened: 30 October 1936
- Electrified: 1978

Passengers
- FY2019: 72 daily
Services
Preceding station	JR-West	Following station
W Kisei Main Line (Kinokuni Line)
Susami; Toward Susami and Shingū	Local	Tsubaki; Toward Kii-Tanabe and Wakayama
Location
- Location within Wakayama Prefecture Location within Japan

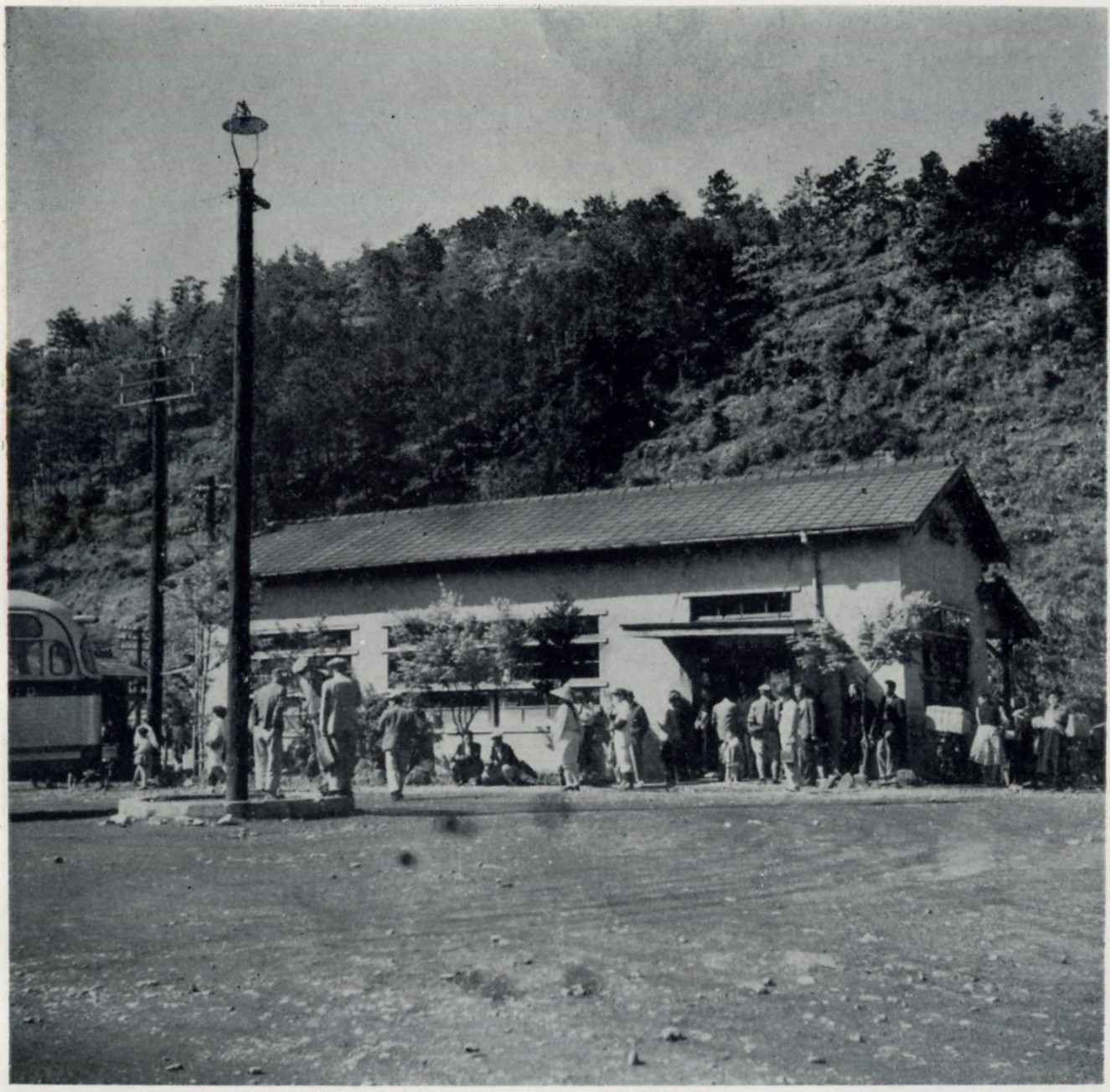
Kii-Hiki Station in 1954

Kii-Hiki Station (紀伊日置駅, Kii-Hiki-eki) is a passenger railway station in located in the town of Shirahama, Nishimuro District, Wakayama Prefecture, Japan, operated by West Japan Railway Company (JR West).

== Lines ==
Kii-Hiki Station is served by the Kisei Main Line (Kinokuni Line), and is located 261.2 kilometers from the terminus of the line at Kameyama Station and 81.0 kilometers from Shingū.

== Station layout ==
The station consists of two opposed side platforms connected to the station building by a level crossing. The station is unattended.

=== Platforms ===
1	■ W Kisei Main Line (Kinokuni Line)	for Susami and Shingū
2	■ W Kisei Main Line (Kinokuni Line)	for Kii-Tanabe and Wakayama

== Adjacent stations ==
«	Service	»
West Japan Railway Company (JR West)
Kisei Main Line
Limited Express Kuroshio: Does not stop at this station
Susami	Local	Tsubaki

== History ==
Kii-Hiki Station opened on October 30, 1936. With the privatization of the Japan National Railways (JNR) on April 1, 1987, the station came under the aegis of the West Japan Railway Company.

== Passenger statistics ==
In fiscal 2019, the station was used by an average of 72 passengers daily (boarding passengers only).

== Surrounding Area ==
- Hiki River
- Shirahama Municipal Atagi Elementary School
- Shirahama Town Hall Hiokigawa Office (formerly Hiokigawa Town Hall)
- National Route 42

== See also ==
- List of railway stations in Japan
