= Sobieto =

Islet in Wakayama, Japan

Native name: ソビエト
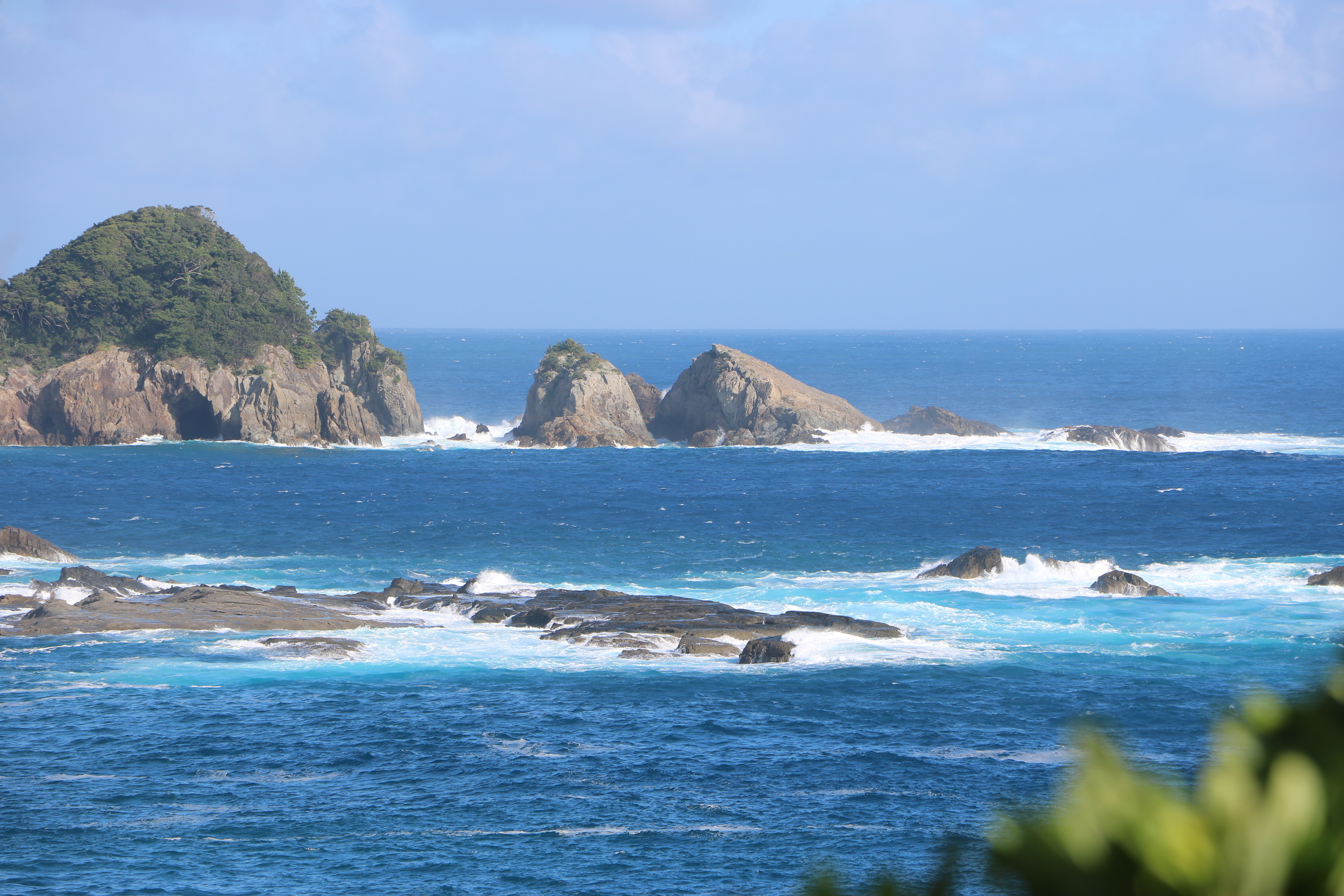
- Picture of the islet (top far right) next to Oki-no-Kuroshima (top far left)

- Location within Japan Location within Wakayama Prefecture

Geography
- Location: Pacific Ocean
- Coordinates: 33°30′31″N 135°33′08″E
- Length: 5 m (16 ft)
- Width: 10 m (30 ft)
- Highest elevation: 5 m (16 ft)

Administration
- Japan
- Prefecture: Wakayama Prefecture
- Town: Susami
- District: Mirozu

Demographics
- Population: 0

Sobieto (Japanese: ソビエト) is an uninhabited islet in Wakayama Prefecture, Japan. It is famous for its unusual name resembling the Soviet Union ("sobieto" means "Soviet" in Japanese) and the unknown origin of the name.

== Etymology ==
The origin of the name of the island is unknown and subject to debate. It is believed that the name "Sobieto" predates the foundation of the Soviet Union in 1922. According to locals, the islet was named "Sobieto" by the locals since ancient times. According to Kiyoshi Taniguchi, a local in the area, the name comes from the Japanese term in Wakayama dialect for "towering shape". It is also unknown why the islet's name was written in katakana.

The islet was not officially named until 1 August 2014, when the Minister of State for Ocean Policy under former Japanese prime minister Shinzo Abe officially named the 158 uninhabited islands from 22 prefectures in Japan, including Sobieto. The act was made as the basis for determining the scope of Japan's territorial waters.

== Geography ==
Sobieto is a small uninhabited islet or skerry about 1 kilometer (0.62 mi) off the coast off Mirozu (見老津), Susami, Wakayama in Japan. It is located south of Kii Peninsula, behind the island of Oki-no-Kuroshima, thus not visible on the coast. It is about 5 metres (16 ft) long, about 10 metres (33 ft) wide and about 5 metres (16 ft) high.

The island can only be accessed by ferry from Mirozu port. It is used by fishermen in the area for rock fishing, although it is also known for being dangerous as waves can hit the fishermen because of its rough topography.

== In popular culture ==
The island is featured in an episode of the NHK program Wabi Tabi aired on 9 May 2016.

== See also ==
- Place names considered unusual
