= Nanki-Shirahama Onsen =

Nanki-Shirahama Onsen 南紀白浜温泉
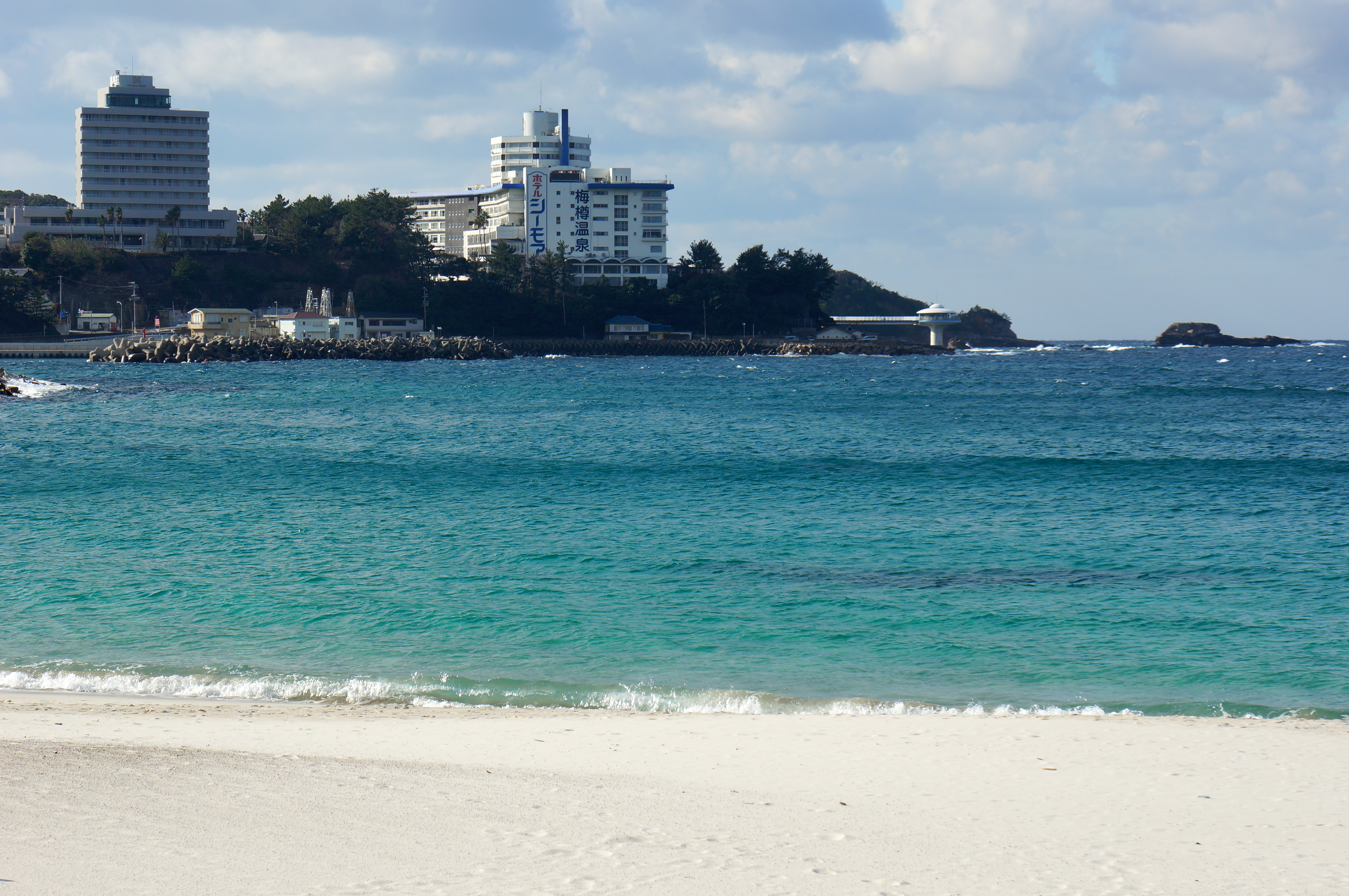
- Nanki-Shirahama Onsen

- Location within Wakayama Prefecture Location within Japan
- Location: Shirahama, Wakayama, Japan
- Coordinates: 33°40′34″N 135°20′16″E
- Elevation: 0 meters
- Type: Chloride, hydrogen carbonate
- Temperature: 32 - 85 deg C

Nanki-Shirahama Onsen (南紀白浜温泉, Nanki-Shirahama onsen) is a hot spring resort in the town of Shirahama, Wakayama Prefecture, Japan. It is a major resort area for the Kansai region of Japan, and was ranked alongside Atami Onsen and Beppu Onsen as one of the three major seaside hot spring resorts.

== History ==
The hot springs in this area have been used since ancient times and are mentioned on several occasions in the Nihon Shoki. Empress Kōgyoku, Empress Jitō and Emperor Monmu are recorded as having visited during the Asuka period and the Nara period Man'yōshū refers to the springs as the "Muro-no-yu" after the ancient district name within Kii Province in which they are located.

The springs were visited by nobility as well as commoners throughout history, and the Edo period "Kii Koku Fudōki" guidebook states that the area had 60 inns for all classes of bathers.

However, the hot springs referred to in these ancient texts are not the present Nanki-Shirahama Onsen, but were located in the mountains further inland.

The current resort was only developed from 1919, when local volunteers began developing the seaside area in competition to the older springs in the mountains. Up until that time, the seaside of Shirahama had been famous for its white quartz sands, which had also been celebrated in ancient poetry as a metaphor for "whiteness". These sands were exploited commercially for their high silica content for use in glass production and were also exported. Efforts to bore for hot water were successful by 1922, and a local commercial shipping company, the Shirahama Onsen Motor Co., Ltd. began promotion of the area as a resort. This received a boost by a visit of Emperor Showa I 1929.

After World War II, the area was promoted as a honeymoon resort and as a destination for group tourism from them 1960s. The opening of Nanki Shirahama Adventure World in the 1990s have gradually changed the focus of the resort towards families.

== See also ==
- Three Ancient Springs
