= Chengdu Zoo =

Zoo in Chengdu, China

- Simplified Chinese: 成都动物园
- Traditional Chinese: 成都動物園
Transcriptions
Standard Mandarin
- Hanyu Pinyin: Chéngdū Dòngwùyuán

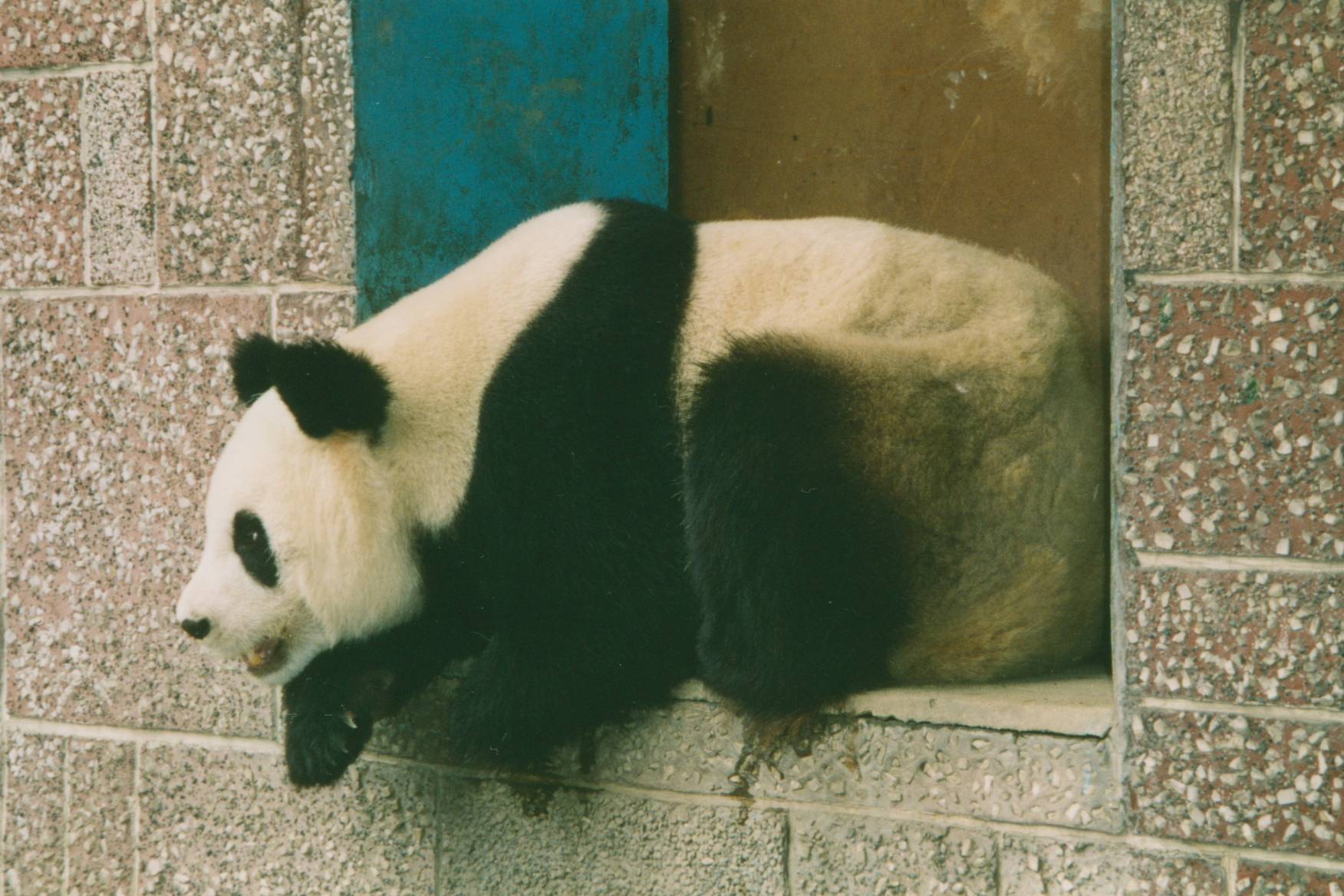
Panda at Chengdu Zoo

Chengdu Zoo (Chinese: 成都动物园) is a zoo located in Chengdu, China. It is home to around 3,000 animals representing 300 species and is China's fourth largest zoo. It is the largest zoo in southwest China.

== Description ==
The Chengdu Zoo's biggest attraction are giant pandas and they house three of them. Most animals live in enclosed areas. The zoo was opened in 1953, and it moved to its current location in 1976. The zoo is 43 acres large and has bred 58 giant pandas in all.
