= Adventure World (Japan) =

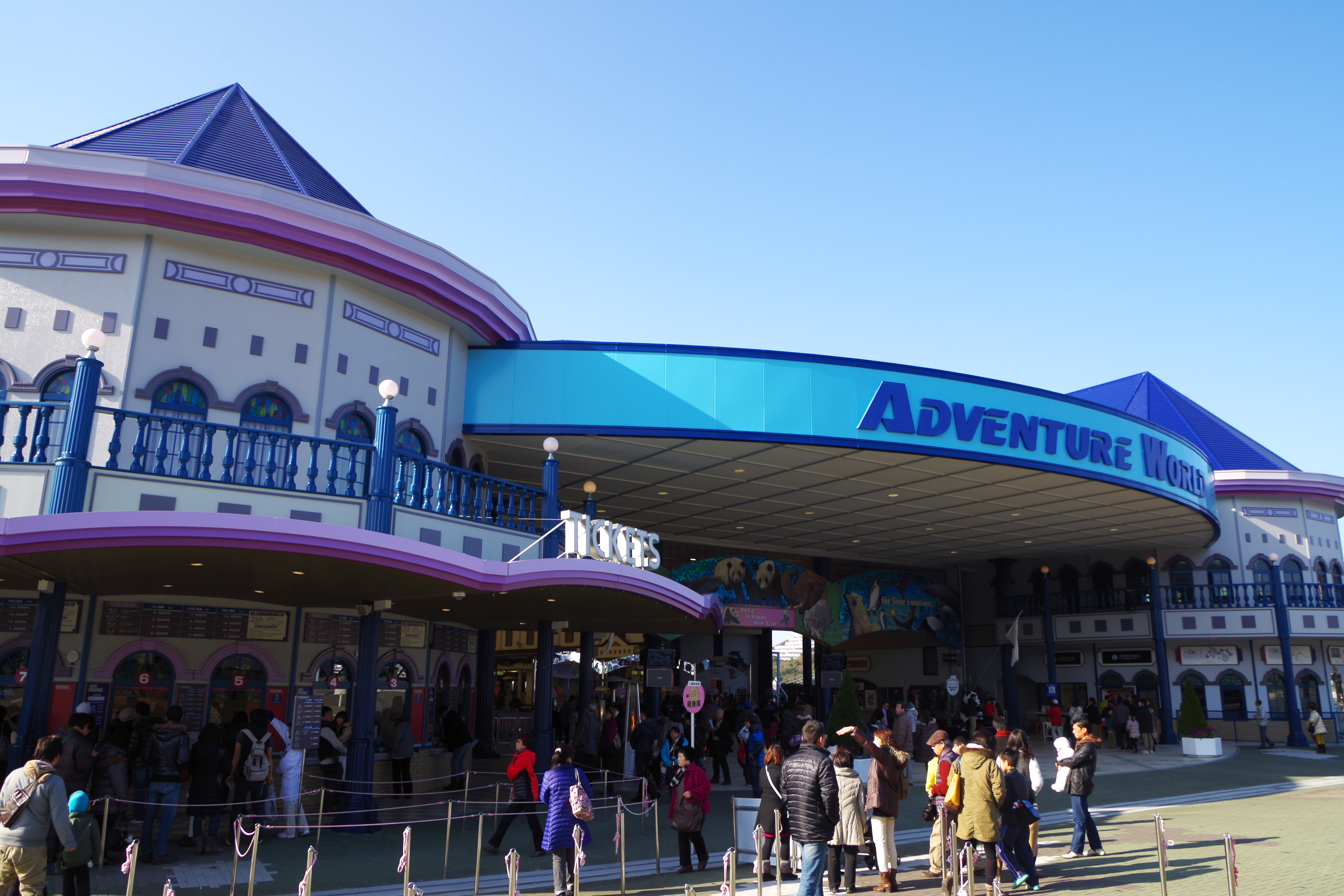
- Adventure World entrance gate
- Interactive map of Adventure World
- Date opened: April 22, 1978; 48 years ago
- Location: Shirahama, Wakayama, Japan
- Memberships: JAZA
- Major exhibits: giant panda, Emperor Penguin etc.

Adventure World (アドベンチャーワールド; Adobenchā Wārudo) is an amusement park with a zoo and public aquarium located in the town of Shirahama, Wakayama Prefecture, Japan. It is operated by Hours Co., Ltd. (AWS), an affiliate of Marusue Co., Ltd. headquartered in Matsubara, Osaka Prefecture. The park opened on April 22, 1978, as Nanki Shirahama World Safari.

== Overview ==
Operating under the motto of "contact between humans, animals, and nature", Adventure World consists of a zoo, aquarium, and an amusement park. The park's many facilities include a giant panda breeding exhibition and dolphin and sea lion shows. The park also hosts various animal-themed restaurants and cafes, as well as academic tours.

In January 2023, two lions at Adventure World died of COVID-19 after contact with an infected employee. A further eight lions became infected, but recovered.

== Zoo ==
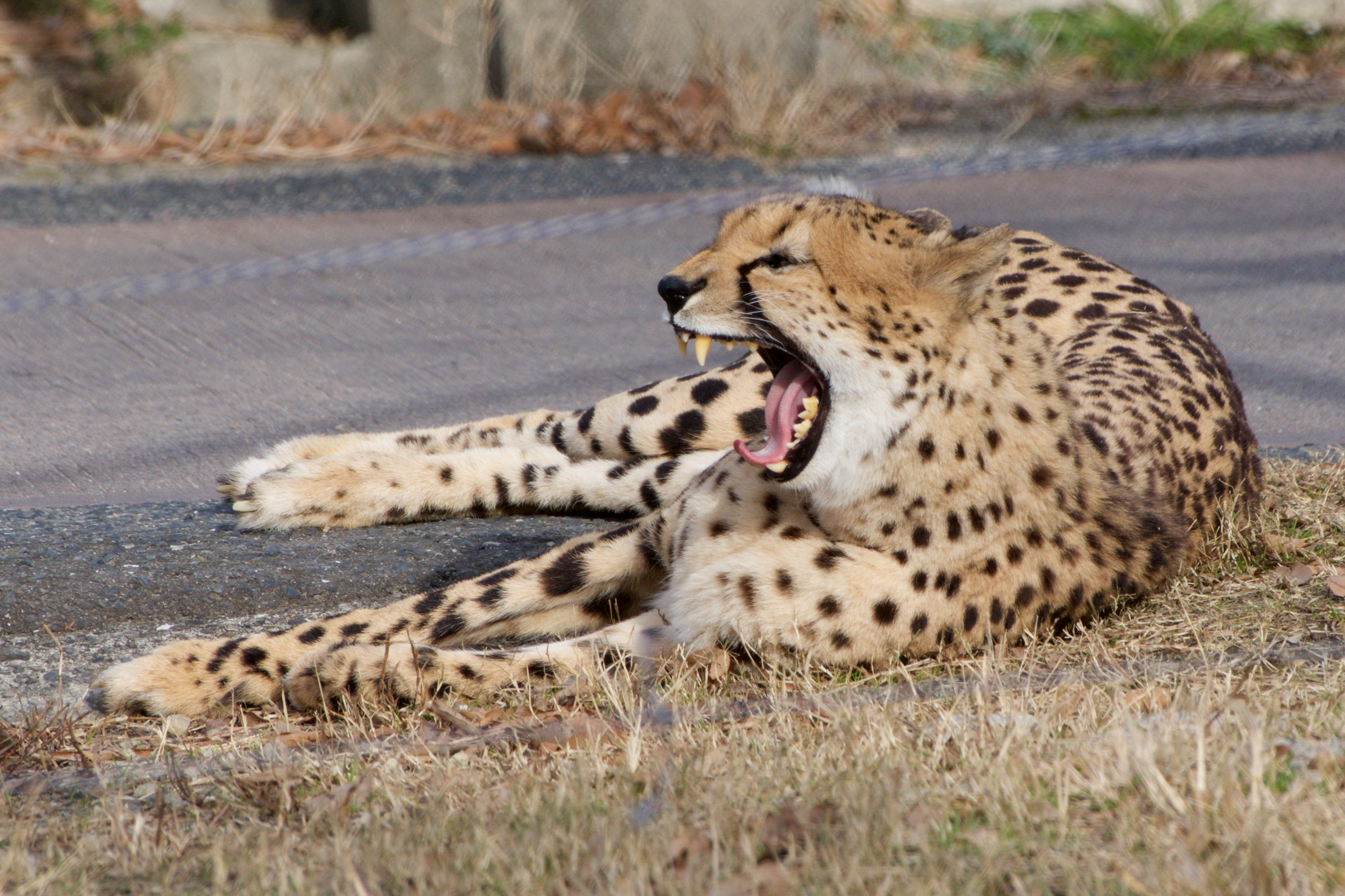
Cheetah

The Adventure World zoo is divided into several different areas and attractions:

- Safari World – Carnivore Zone, Herbivore Zone
- Panda Love – Giant panda exhibition facility
- Breeding Center – Giant panda breeding facility
- Wanwan Garden – Dogs ('Wanwan' is a Japanese onomatopoeia for a dogs bark)
- Fureai Square – Pygmy hippopotamuses, capybaras, small monkeys, chimpanzees, birds such as parakeets, etc.
- Flamingo Square – Flamingos and red pandas
- Elephant Fureai Square – Asian elephants
- Horse Camp – Horses and birds of prey

== Giant Panda Conservation ==
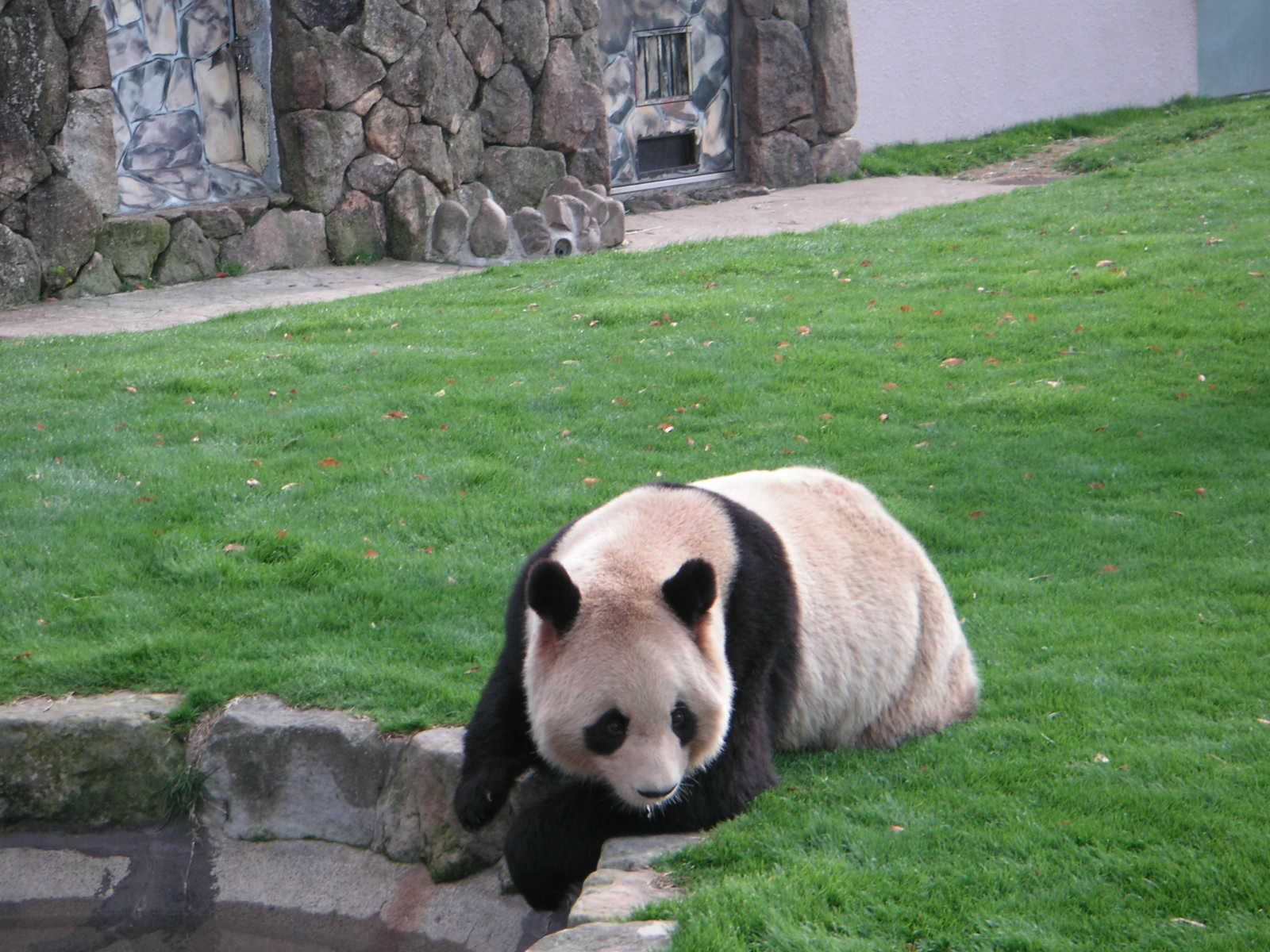
Giant panda

Adventure World operates as the Japanese branch of the Chengdu Giant Panda Research Base in Chengdu, China. The giant panda breeding research project had successfully bred 17 giant pandas by September 2018, the highest number in the world both in terms of live births and mature offspring maintained outside of mainland China. As of September 12, 2018, Adventure World was home to six of the ten captive pandas in Japan; Ueno Zoo had three, and Kobe Oji Zoo had one.

Panda Love, the park's panda center, provides an open area where pandas can roam at will. All the giant pandas currently in captivity, including offspring, are owned by the Chengdu Giant Panda Research Base.

The giant pandas at the park are a massive tourism attraction for Shirahama, known colloquially as 'The Panda Town'.

On July 11, 2019, The Wakayama Prefectural Police named Saihama, one of the park's giant pandas, the "Traffic Safety Wakayama Dream Ambassador" (交通安全和歌山夢大使) to raise awareness for road traffic safety. Saihama appeared in posters and promotional products to raise awareness for traffic safety. In July 2022, as part of the "Wakayama Summer Traffic Safety Movement", Ayahama became the new mascot of the campaign.

All pandas born at the research base have names that carry the suffix hin (浜) (e.g., Rauhin). Eimei fathered 14 pandas, except for the 1st (Yoshihama), and the 6th panda, who died shortly after birth. Eimei gave birth to Ranbao (male) in 2002 at the Lanzhou Zoo in China via artificial insemination from Ran and Shulan (twin sisters born from Umeume), but he died on August 30, 2012.

Giant pandas currently at Adventure World
Name	Sex	Date of birth	Birthplace	Notes
Rauhin/Liangbang (らうひん/良浜)	Female	September 6, 2000 (age 24)	Adventure World	Father: Haran, mother: Meimei; The first giant panda born in Japan in twelve years.
Yuihin/Jiebang (ゆいひん/結浜)	Female	September 18, 2016 (age 7)	Adventure World	Father: Eimei, mother: Rauhin
Saihin/Caibang (さいひん/彩浜)	Female	August 14, 2018 (age 5)	Adventure World	Father: Eimei, mother: Rauhin; had a stillborn twin
Fuhin/Fengbang (ふうひん/楓浜)	Female	November 22, 2020 (age 4)	Adventure World	Father: Eimei, mother: Rauhin; originally thought to be male

Giant pandas previously in captivity
Name	Sex	Date of birth	Birthplace	Entry date	Departure Destination and Date	Notes
Shinshin (シンシン/辰辰)	Male	-	-	September 19, 1988	Returned to China January 10, 1989	-
Keikei (ケイケイ/慶慶)	Female	-	-	September 19, 1988	Returned to China January 10, 1989	-
Youhin/Rongbang† (ようひん/蓉浜)	Female	September 4, 1992	Chengdu Zoo	September 4, 1992	-	Died July 17, 1997 (age 4), Adventure World
Eimei/Yong Ming (えいめい/永明)	Male	September 14, 1992 (age 31)	Beijing Zoo	September 6, 1994	Chengdu Zoo, February 22, 2023	-
Meimei† (めいめい/梅梅)	Female	August 31, 1994	Chengdu Okumaneko Breeding Research Base	July 7, 2000	-	Died October 15, 2008 at 5:29 (age 14)
Yuhin/Xiongbang (ゆうひん/雄浜)	Male	December 17, 2001 (age 22)	Adventure World	-	Chengdu Okumaneko Breeding Research Base, June 21, 2004	Father: Eimei, mother: MeiMei
Ryuhin/Longbang (りゅうひん/隆浜)	Male	September 8, 2003 (age 20)	Adventure World	-	Chengdu Zoo, October 27, 2007; moved to Huai An Zoo from 2016 to 2020	Father: Eimei, mother: MeiMei; twins with Shuhin
Shuhin/Qiubang (しゅうひん/秋浜)	Male	September 8, 2003 (age 20)	Adventure World	-	Chengdu Zoo, October 27, 2007; moved to Shenzhen Zoo	Father: Eimei, mother: MeiMei; twins with Ryuhin
Kouhin/Xinbang (こうひん/幸浜)	Male	August 23, 2005 (age 18)	Adventure World	-	Chengdu Zoo, March 15, 2010	Father: Eimei, mother: Male; twins with unnamed panda
Unnamed†	Male	August 24, 2005	Adventure World	-	-	Died August 25, 2005 due to being underweight (66g); twins with Kouhin
Aihin/Aibang (あいひん/愛浜)	Female	December 23, 2006 (age 17)	Adventure World	-	Chengdu Zoo, December 14, 2012	Father: Eimei, mother: MeiMei; twins with Meihin
Meihin/Mingbang (めいひん/明浜)	Male	December 23, 2006 (age 17)	Adventure World	-	Chengdu Zoo, December 14, 2012; subsequently moved to Ryushu Zoo in 2014	Father: Eimei, mother: MeiMei; twins with Aihin
Meihin/Meibang (めいひん/梅浜)	Female	September 13, 2008 (age 15)	Adventure World	-	Chengdu Zoo, February 26, 2013	Father: Eimei, mother: Rauhin; twins with Eihin; first pandas to be born in captivity for three generations
Eihin/Yongbang (えいひん/永浜)	Male	September 13, 2008 (age 15)	Adventure World	-	Chengdu Zoo, February 26, 2013	Father: Eimei, mother: Rauhin; twins with Meihin; first pandas to be born in captivity for three generations
Kaihin/Haibang (かいひん/海浜)	Male	August 11, 2010 (age 13)	Adventure World	-	Chengdu Zoo, June 5, 2017	Father: Eimei, mother: Rauhin; twins with Youhin
Youhin/Yangbang (ようひん/陽浜)	Female	August 11, 2010 (age 13)	Adventure World	-	Chengdu Zoo, June 5, 2017	Father: Eimei, mother: Rauhin; twins with Kaihin
Yuhin/Youbang (ゆうひん/優浜)	Female	August 10, 2012 (age 11)	Adventure World	-	Chengdu Zoo, June 5, 2017	Father: Eimei, mother: Rauhin; had a stillborn twin
Ouhin/Yingbang (おうひん/桜浜)	Female	December 2, 2014 (age 9)	Adventure World	-	Return to China, February 2023	Father: Eimei, mother: Rauhin; twin sister of Touhin
Touhin/Taobang (とうひん/桃浜)	Female	December 2, 2014 (age 10)	Adventure World	-	Return to China, February 2023	Father: Eimei, mother: Rauhin; twin sister of Ouhin

(In order of birth, regardless of transfer date)

In March 2011, Wakayama Prefecture Governor Yoshinobu Nisaka gave the title of Wakayama Prefecture Honore to three pandas: Eimei, Rauhan, and Meimei.

This followed the Tama Stationmaster at Kishi Station on the Wakayama Electric Railway Kishigawa Line, and acted as a recognition and tribute to the nationwide dissemination of the charm of Wakayama Prefecture by increasing the number of panda families.

== Aquarium ==
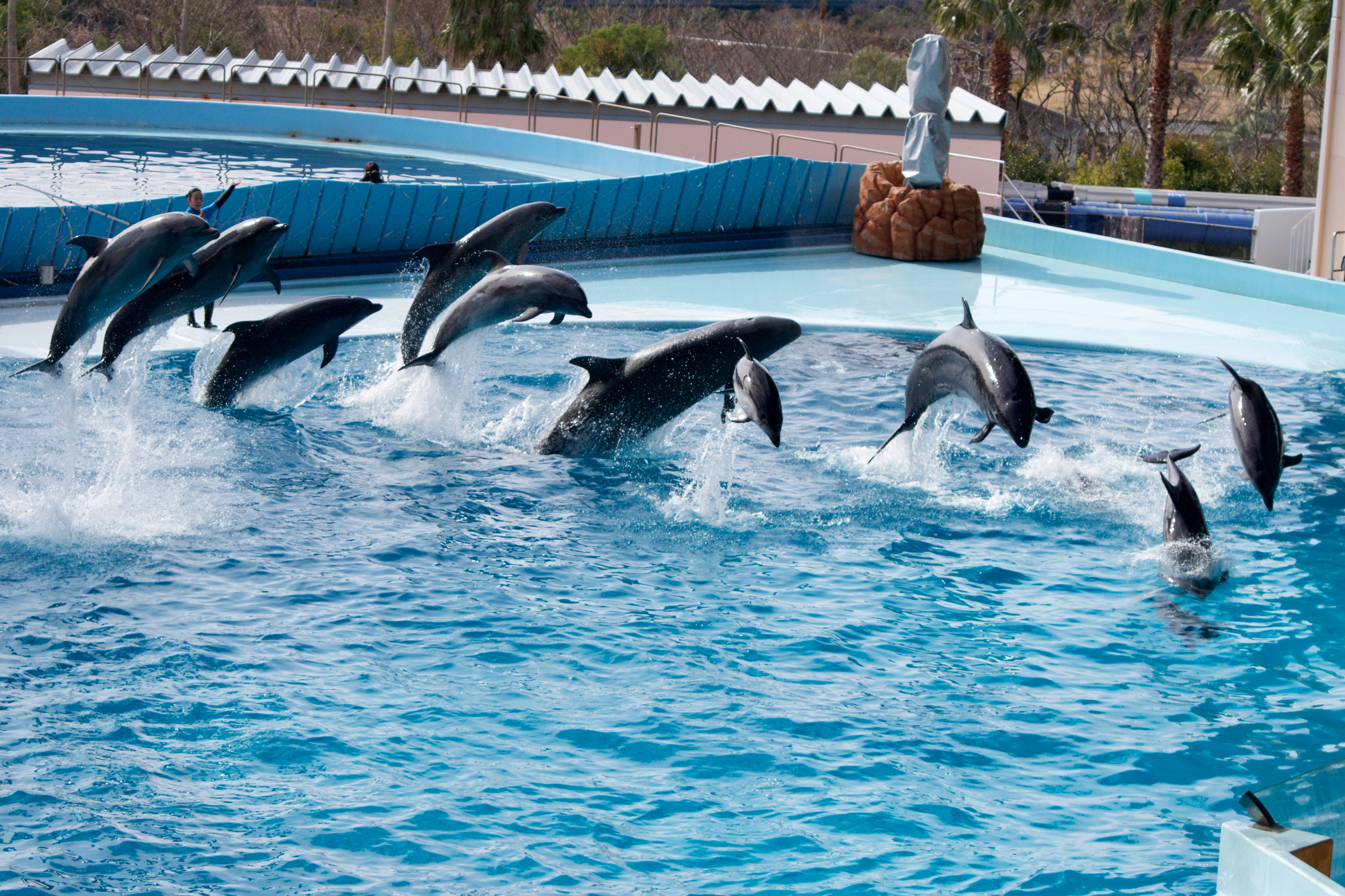
Marine Live show

=== Attractions ===
- Sea Animal Museum – Polar bears, penguins and seal exhibitions in an indoor aquarium.
- Penguin Kingdom – Penguins and sea otters.
- Big Ocean – Dolphin and whale shows.
- Marine Wave – Contact events with dolphins.
- Animal Land – Sea lion and otter shows.

==== Marine Live & Animal Action ====
The dolphin and whale show, called "Marine Live", is held in a pool with a tank capacity of 10,000,000 litres (2,642,000 US gal). The tank has a width of 47 m (154 ft), a length of 21 m (69 ft), and a depth of 8 m (26 ft). The show features an original soundtrack, sold within the park. A sea lion show is also held under the name "Animal Action".

==== Polar bears ====
On October 20, 2009, Adventure World announced the arrival of a female polar bear cub named Mirai, born on October 13. Mirai died on May 16, 2014.

In 2013, a male polar bear cub was born. Following the death of a male polar bear from liver cancer in 2014, it was decided to borrow the male polar bear Gogo from Tennōji Zoo in March 2015.

==== Penguins ====
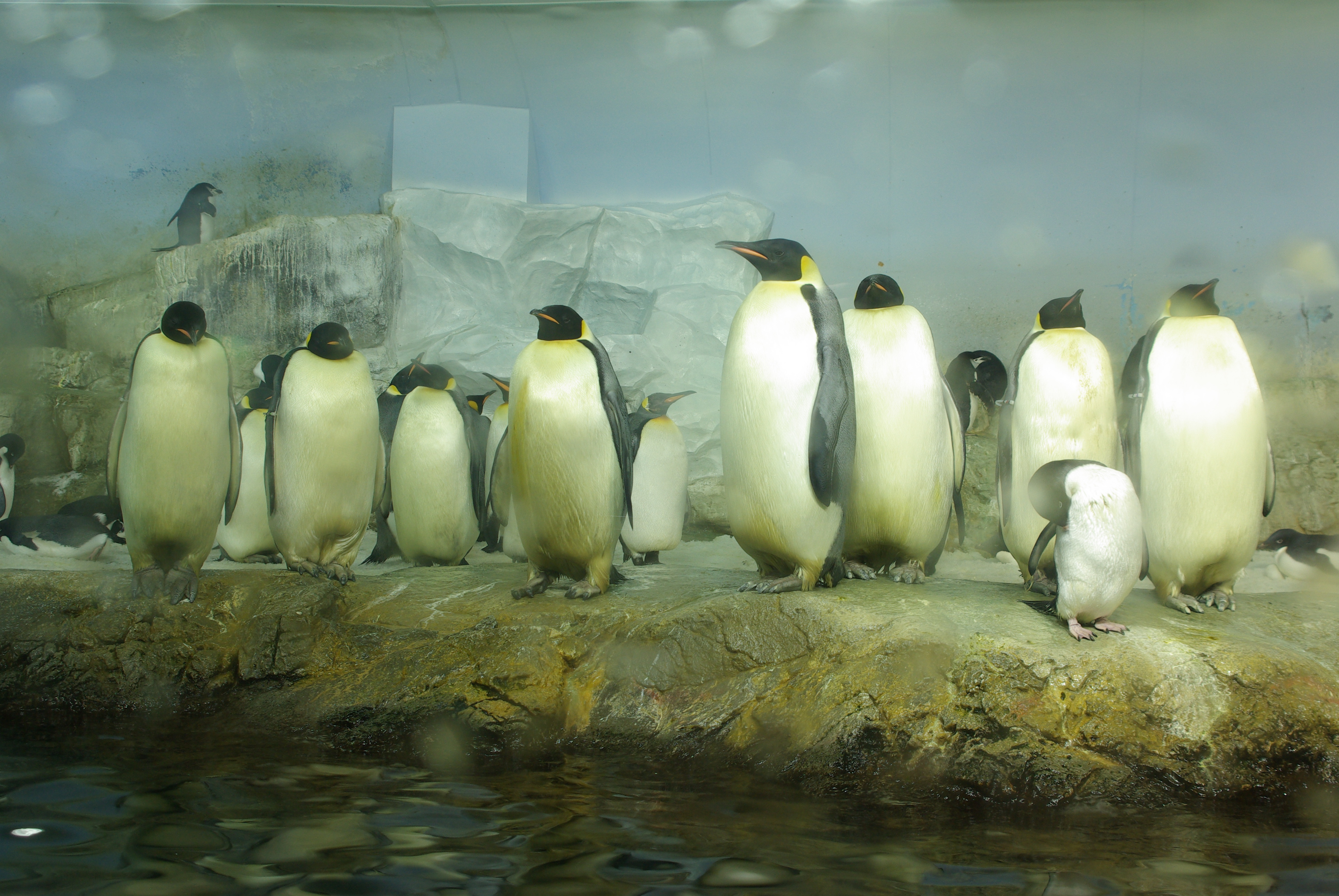
Emperor penguins

Eight species of penguins are exhibited, including (emperor penguins, king penguins, gentoo penguins, Adélie penguins, chinstrap penguins, rockhopper penguins, cape penguins, and fairy penguins).

Approximately 470 birds have been bred, which is one of the largest amounts in the world. In particular, the breeding of emperor penguins has been successful. On October 1, 2019, the facility hatched its 13th emperor penguin chick.

==== Killer whales ====
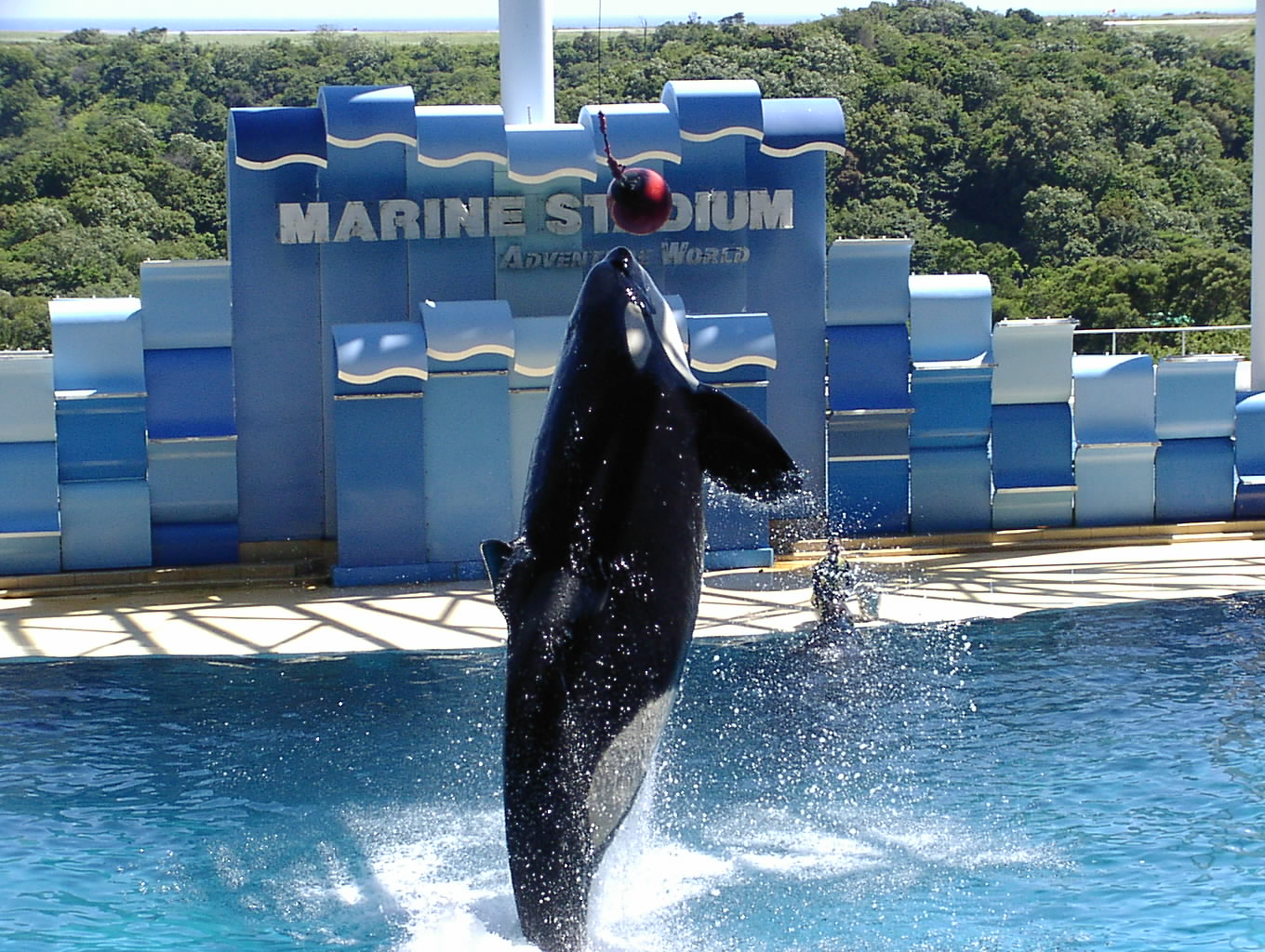
Killer whale

The killer whale show at Adventure World was once famous but ceased after the death of the last killer whale in 2005.

Adventure World's first killer whale, Kianu (female, body length 6 m (20 ft), weight 3 t), was brought from Six Flags Discovery Kingdom in California five days before the opening of the amusement park in 1978. Some time afterwards, only Goro (a male brought from Taiji, Wakayama, in 1985) remained, but fell ill on 18 January 2005 and died on March 21 at 9:20 pm. Other orcas, including Benkei, Ushiwaka, Ruka, and Ai, were also bred intermittently. Four eggs and sets of sperm from Ruka, Goro, Ran, and Kyu, collected before they died, have been preserved in preparation for future artificial insemination.

== Play Zone (Amusement Park) ==
Adventure World also features an Amusement Park section called 'Play Zone'. The area features a number of attractions, including:

- Ocean View Ferris Wheel
- Big Adventure Rollercoaster
- Merry-Go-Round
- Space Fighter
- Highway Cart (Go-Karts)
- Animal Fantasy (Teacups)
- Wakuwaku Kids Jungle (Jungle gym)

The park features both indoor and outdoor attractions.

== Zoological Academy ==
An educational facility for the training of zookeepers connected to the park opened in 2000. Located on the Adventure World site, it is the only facility in Japan where trainees receive specialised daily animal training in the park from keepers.

The Academy offers a two-year wildlife management programme and a one-year wildlife short-term programme. Programmes also include basic veterinary medicine, biology, and zoology. Classes are also offered in English, business, hospitality, and Zoo management. In the final year, trainees conduct research on an animal within the park.

The academy works closely with the AWS Zoological Academy in the United States and Australia. Graduates are active in animal breeding sites all over Japan.

== See also ==
- Giant pandas around the world
- List of giant pandas
