= Kii Corporation =

- Company type: Private
- Founded: 2010
- Headquarters: Tokyo (HQ), San Mateo, California, San Francisco, California Hong Kong
- Industry: Telecommunications
- Website: kii.com

Kii Corporation is a company that provides mobile backend as a service (MBaaS), distribution partnerships and venture capital. The company has offices in Tokyo, San Mateo, California, San Francisco, California, and Hong Kong. The Kii Cloud service allows mobile app developers to add cloud services to their apps without writing server software.

== History ==
Kii Corporation was founded in July 2010 as the result of the merger of Synclore Corporation of Japan and Servo. Synclore's customers included NTT DoCoMo and SoftBank. Servo's customers included China Mobile.

== Company Structure ==
Kii Corporation is structured in three parts:

- Kii Capital: Kii Capital is a venture fund in Silicon Valley that invests in mobile consumer apps.
- Kii Distribution: Kii Distribution helps mobile app developers create partnerships.
- Kii Cloud: Kii Cloud is a Mobile Backend-as-a-Service (MBaaS) that provides mobile app developers with cloud technology without having to write server software.
