= Susami Station =

Railway station in Susami, Wakayama Prefecture, Japan

Susami Station 周参見駅
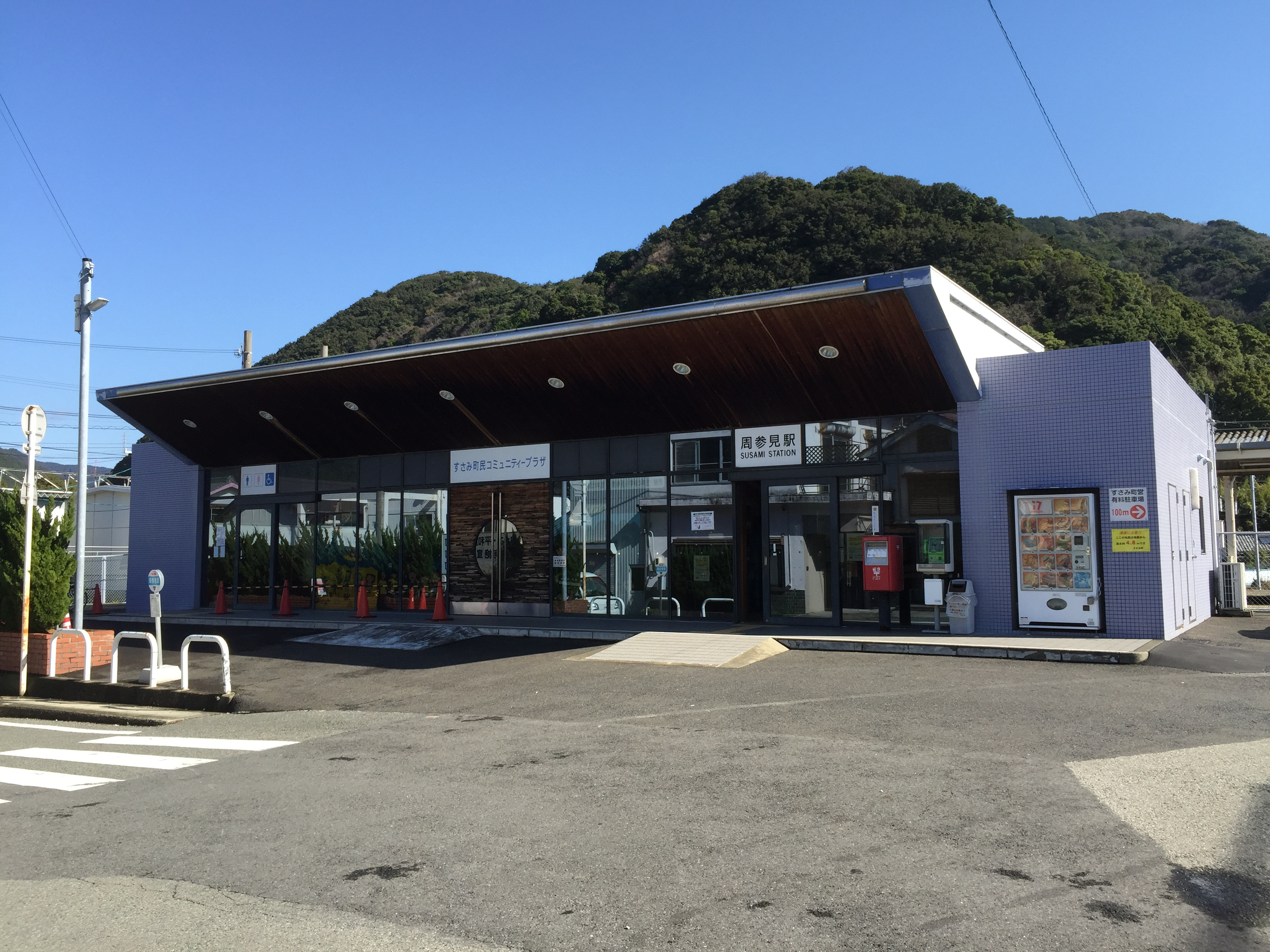
- Susami Station, January 2016

General information
- Location: 4296, Susami, Susami-cho, Nishimuro-gun, Wakayama-ken 649-2621; Japan
- Coordinates: 33°32′48.54″N 135°29′44.52″E
- System: JR-West commuter rail station
- Owner: West Japan Railway Company
- Operator: West Japan Railway Company
- Line: W Kisei Main Line (Kinokuni Line)
- Distance: 254.0 km (157.8 miles) from Kameyama; 73.8 km (45.9 miles) from Shingū
- Platforms: 2 side platform
- Tracks: 2
- Train operators: West Japan Railway Company

Construction
- Structure type: At grade
- Accessible: None

Other information
- Status: Unstaffed
- Website: Official website

History
- Opened: 30 October 1936
- Electrified: 1978

Passengers
- FY2019: 115 daily
Services
Preceding station	JR-West	Following station
W Kisei Main Line (Kinokuni Line)
Mirozu; Toward Kushimoto and Shingū	Local	Kii-Hiki; Toward Kii-Tanabe and Wakayama
Location
- Location within Wakayama Prefecture Location within Japan

Susami Station (周参見駅, Susami-eki) is a passenger railway station located in the town of Susami, Nishimuro District, Wakayama Prefecture, Japan, operated by West Japan Railway Company (JR West).

== Lines ==
Susami Station is served by the Kisei Main Line (Kinokuni Line), and is located 254.0 kilometers from the terminus of the line at Kameyama Station and 73.8 kilometers from Shingū.

== Station layout ==
The station consists of one island platform and one side platform connected to the station building by a level crossing. One side of the island platform (Platform 2) is not in use. The station is unattended.

=== Platforms ===
1・3	■ W Kisei Main Line (Kinokuni Line)	for Kii-Tanabe and Wakayama
1・3	■ W Kisei Main Line (Kinokuni Line)	for Kushimoto and Shingū

== Adjacent stations ==
«	Service	»
West Japan Railway Company (JR West)
Kisei Main Line
Kushimoto (One-way Operation)	West Express Ginga	Shirahama
Kushimoto	Limited Express Kuroshio	Shirahama
Mirozu	Local	Kii-Hiki

== History ==
Susami Station opened on October 30, 1936. With the privatization of the Japan National Railways (JNR) on April 1, 1987, the station came under the aegis of the West Japan Railway Company.

== Passenger statistics ==
In fiscal 2019, the station was used by an average of 115 passengers daily (boarding passengers only).

== Surrounding Area ==
- Susami Town Hall
- Susami Municipal Susami Elementary School
- Susami Municipal Susami Junior High School
- Susami Municipal National Health Insurance Susami Hospital
- National Route 42

== See also ==
- List of railway stations in Japan
