= Kii-Tanabe Station =

Railway station in Tanabe, Wakayama Prefecture, Japan

Kii-Tanabe Station 紀伊田辺駅
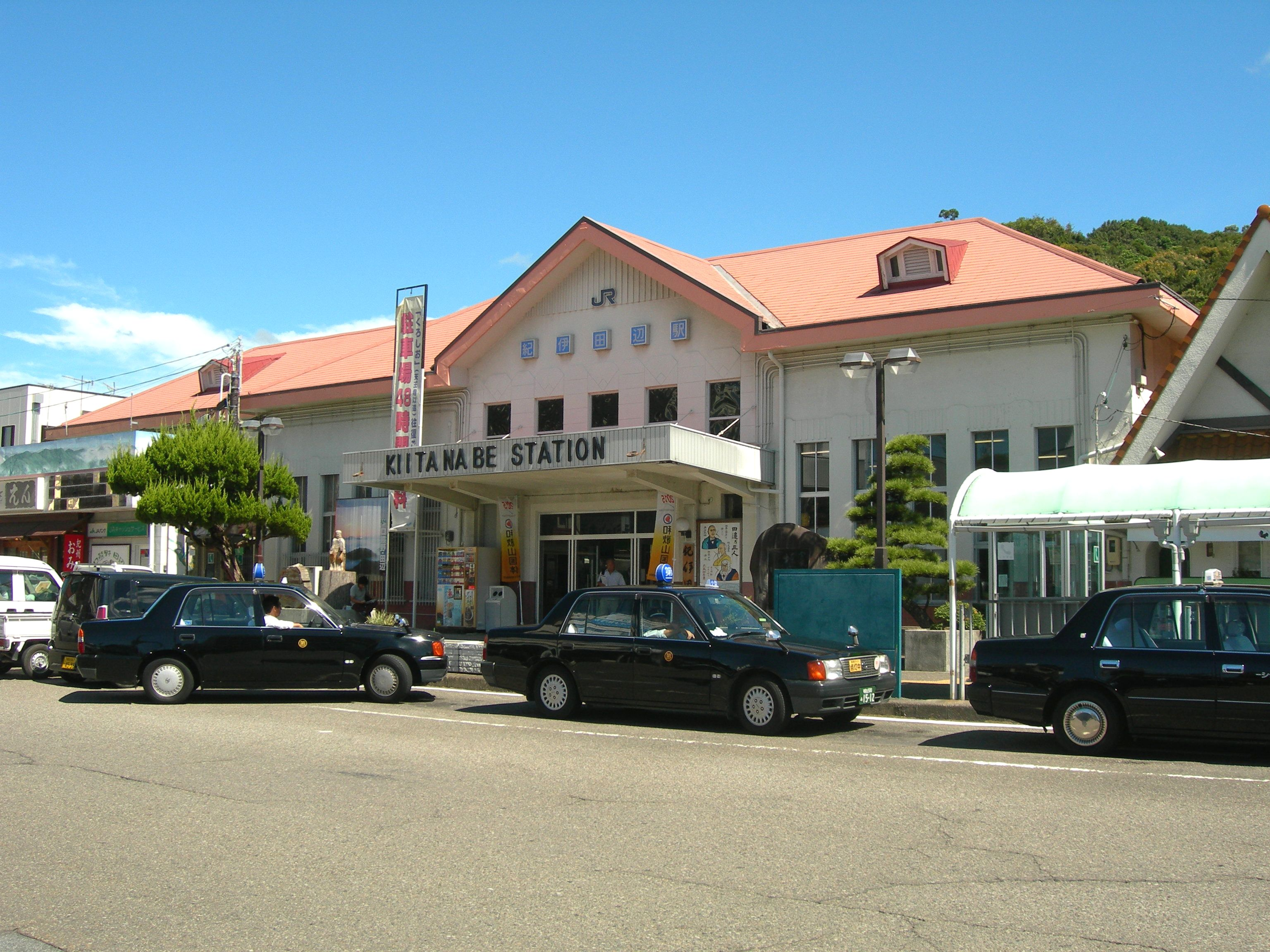
- Kii-Tanabe Station-2010

General information
- Location: 961 Minato, Tanabe-shi, Wakayama-ken 646-0031; Japan
- Coordinates: 33.7338°N 135.3837°E
- System: JR-West commuter rail station
- Owner: West Japan Railway Company
- Operator: West Japan Railway Company
- Line: W Kisei Main Line (Kinokuni Line)
- Distance: 285.4 km (177.3 miles) from Kameyama; 105.2 km (65.4 miles) from Shingū
- Platforms: 1 side + 1 island platform
- Tracks: 2
- Train operators: West Japan Railway Company

Construction
- Structure type: At grade

Other information
- Status: Staffed ( Midori no Madoguchi)
- Website: Official website

History
- Opened: 8 November 1932
- Electrified: 1978

Passengers
- FY2019: 1364 daily
Services
Preceding station	JR-West	Following station
W Kisei Main Line (Kinokuni Line)
Asso; Toward Susami and Shingū	Local	Kii-Tanabe; Toward Kii-Tanabe and Wakayama
Location
- Location within Wakayama Prefecture Location within Japan

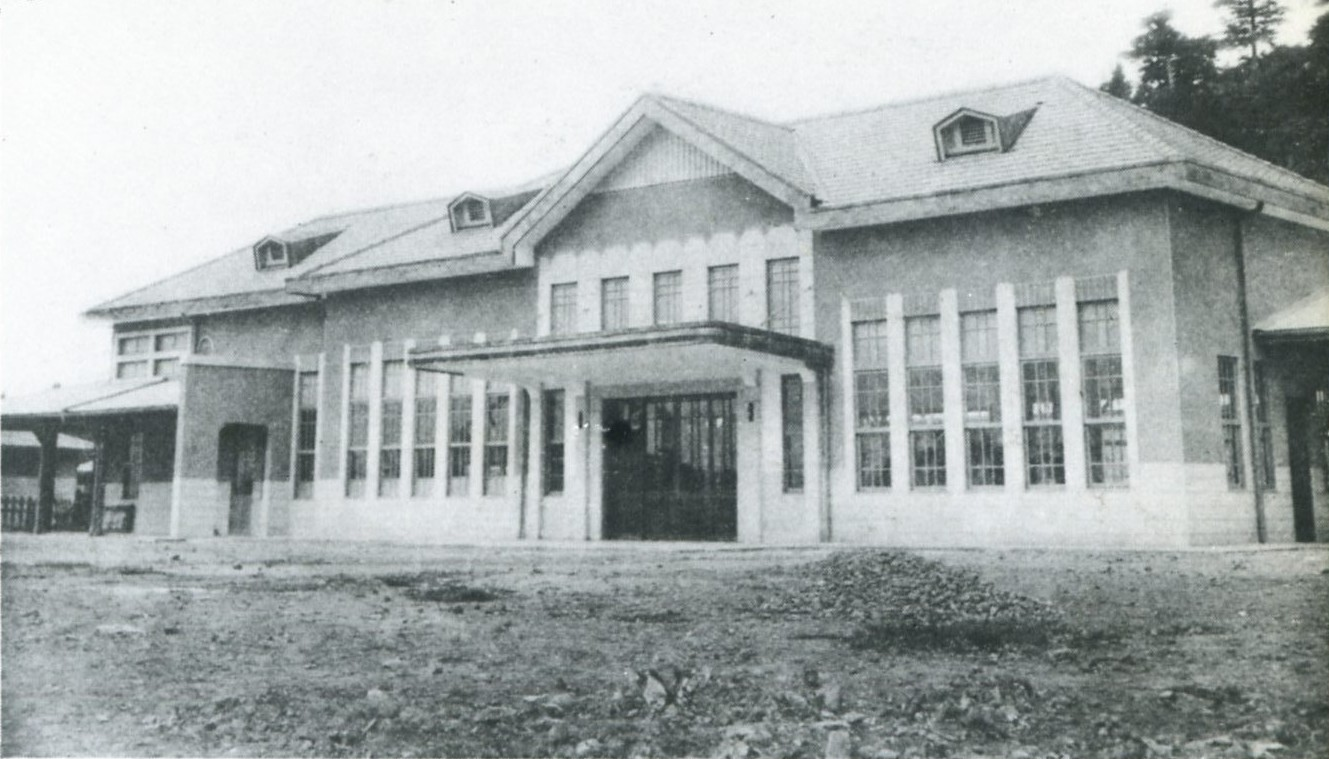
Kii-Tanabe Station on opening in 1932

Kii-Tanabe Station (紀伊田辺駅, Kii-Tanabe-eki) is a passenger railway station in located in the city of Tanabe, Wakayama Prefecture, Japan, operated by West Japan Railway Company (JR West).

== Lines ==
Kii-Tanabe Station is served by the Kisei Main Line (Kinokuni Line), and is located 285.4 kilometers from the terminus of the line at Kameyama Station and 105.2 kilometers from Shingū.

== Station layout ==
The station consists of one side platform and one island platform connected to the station building by a footbridge. The station has a Midori no Madoguchi staffed ticket office.

=== Platforms ===
1	■ W Kisei Main Line (Kinokuni Line)	for Wakayama, Tennoji, Shin-Osaka and Kyoto
2	■ W Kisei Main Line (Kinokuni Line)	for Shirahama, Kushimoto and Shingū
3	■ W Kisei Main Line (Kinokuni Line)	for Gobō and Wakayama

== Adjacent stations ==
«	Service	»
West Japan Railway Company (JR West)
Kisei Main Line
Shirahama (One-way Operation)	West Express Ginga	Kainan
Shirahama	Limited Express Kuroshio	Minabe or Gobo
Terminus	Rapid	Haya
Kii-Shinjō	Local	Haya

== History ==
Kii-Tanabe Station opened on November 8, 1932. With the privatization of the Japan National Railways (JNR) on April 1, 1987, the station came under the aegis of the West Japan Railway Company.

== Passenger statistics ==
In fiscal 2019, the station was used by an average of 1364 passengers daily (boarding passengers only).

== Surrounding Area ==
- Tanabe City Tourist Center
- Kii-Tanabe station square shopping street
- Tanabe City Hall
- Wakayama District Court Tanabe Branch
- Tokei Shrine

== See also ==
- List of railway stations in Japan
