= List of mergers in Wakayama Prefecture =

Here is a list of mergers in Wakayama Prefecture, Japan since the Heisei era.

== Mergers from April 1, 1999 to Present ==
- On October 1, 2004 - the village of Minabegawa (from Hidaka District) was merged into the expanded town of Minabe.
- On April 1, 2005 - the old town of Kushimoto (from Nishimuro District) absorbed the town of Koza (from Higashimuro District) to create the new and expanded town of Kushimoto (now part of Higashimuro District).
- On April 1, 2005 - the town of Shimotsu (from Kaisō District) was merged into the expanded city of Kainan.
- On May 1, 2005 - the town of Kawabe, and the villages of Miyama and Nakatsu (all from Hidaka District) were merged to create the town of Hidakagawa.
- On May 1, 2005 - the old city of Tanabe absorbed the village of Ryūjin (from Hidaka District), the town of Nakahechi, the village of Ōtō (both from Nishimuro District), and the town of Hongū (from Higashimuro District) to create the new and expanded city of Tanabe.
- On October 1, 2005 - the village of Hanazono (from Ito District) was merged into the expanded town of Katsuragi.
- On October 1, 2005 - the town of Kumanogawa (from Higashimuro District) was merged into the expanded city of Shingū.
- On November 11, 2005 - the towns of Kishigawa, Kokawa, Momoyama, Naga and Uchita (all from Naga District) were merged to create the city of Kinokawa.
- On January 1, 2006 - the towns of Kanaya, Kibi and Shimizu (all from Arida District) were merged to form the town of Aridagawa.
- On January 1, 2006 - the towns of Misato and Nokami (both from Kaisō District) were merged to create the town of Kimino.
- On March 1, 2006 - the town of Kōyaguchi (from Ito District) was merged into the expanded city of Hashimoto.
- On March 1, 2006 - the town of Hikigawa (from Nishimuro District) was merged into the expanded town of Shirahama.
- On April 1, 2006 - the town of Iwade (from Naga District) was elevated to city status. Naga District was dissolved with this change in status.
