= Kishū dialect =

Japanese dialect of Kansai, Japan

- Wakayama dialect
- 紀州弁
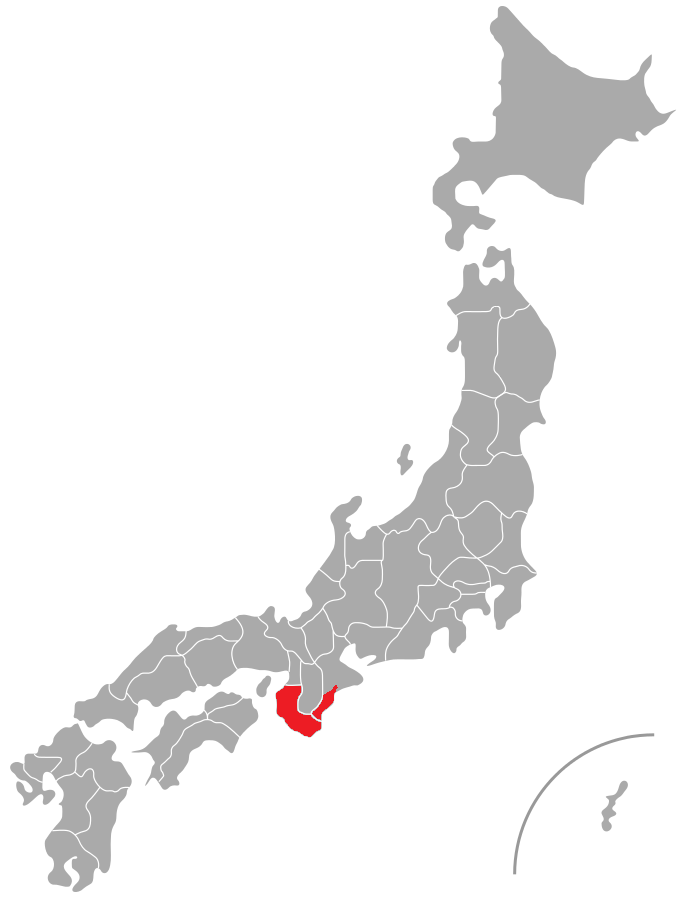
- Kishū dialect area (dark red)
- Native to: Japan
- Region: Wakayama Prefecture and southern Mie Prefecture, Kansai
- Language family: Japonic: Japanese; Western; Kansai; Southern; Kishū dialect
- Dialects: Kihoku; Kichū; Kinan; Kitamuro; Minamimuro

Language codes
- ISO 639-3: –

The Kishū dialect (紀州弁, Kishū-ben) is a dialect of Japanese spoken in Wakayama and southern Mie prefectures. It is also called the Wakayama dialect (和歌山弁, Wakayama-ben) in Wakayama.

The Kishu dialect is a member of the Kansai dialect group and is spoken in the area corresponding to the former Kii Province.

== Classification ==
Linguist Minoru Umegaki classified the Kishu dialect as a part of the Kansai dialect group of Western Japanese, more specifically the Southern Kansai dialect. It shares this subgroup with the dialects of southern Nara Prefecture and eastern Mie Prefecture. It has been noted for possessing many archaic and uncommon features present in its phonology, syntax and vocabulary that are even more pronounced than those of the central Kansai region dialects. This is believed to be due to the travel-hindering mountainous terrain of the area, as well as its historical isolation from any major routes that connected eastern and western Japan.

=== Sub-divisions ===
The Kishu dialect within Wakayama Prefecture can be further divided into the Kihoku, Kichu and Kinan sub-dialects, as proposed by Eichi Murauchi in 1982. The Kichu sub-dialect and in particular the dialect around Tanabe retain Nidan verb conjugation as well as an older Keihan-style pitch accent. In contrast, the dialect of Higashimuro within the Kinan sub-dialect and areas close to Mie Prefecture possess a Tarui-style pitch accent as well as a more unique local variation. The various sub-divisions of the dialect are shown below.

Kishu dialect in Wakayama Prefecture

- Kihoku
  - Washi sub-dialect - Wakayama city, Kainan, Kaiso district (excluding Misato)
  - Naga sub-dialect - Naga district (modern-day Kinokawa and Iwade save for a few small areas)
  - Ito sub-dialect - Ito district; including Hashimoto but excluding Hanazono and parts of Koya and Katsuragi
- Kichu
  - Flatlands sub-dialect – Various towns and cities including: Arida, Hirokawa, Inami and Minabe
  - Interior sub-dialect – Various towns and villages including: Shimizu, Miyama and Ryujin
- Kinan
  - Nishimuro sub-dialect
    - Nishimuro flatlands – Including but not limited to: Tanabe, Shirahama and Kamitonda
    - Nishimuro interior – Including but not limited to: Nakahechi, Oto and parts of Susami
  - Higashimuro sub-dialect
    - Higashimuro flatlands – Including but not limited to: Shingu, parts of Nachikatsuura and Taiji.
    - Higashimuro interior – Including but not limited to: Hongu, Kitayama and Kumanogawa.

Within Mie Prefecture, the dialect can be further divided into Kitamuro and Minamimuro sub-dialects, as shown below.

Kishu dialect in Mie Prefecture

- Kitamuro sub-dialect – Owase, Kihoku and Taiki.
- Minamimuro sub-dialect – Kumano and Minamimuro district.

== Phonology ==
The Kishu dialect possesses phonological traits that are common in Kansai dialects. For example, monomoraic words are lengthened to two mora and long u (う) sounds are shortened. For example, omouta (思うた I thought (Western Japanese)) is said omota (思た) and akaunaru (赤うなる become red) is pronounced akonaru (あこなる).

=== Diphthong merging ===
Diphthong merging occurs in certain parts of the Kishu dialect area. Predominantly in southern Wakayama Prefecture, the diphthong ai (あい) merges to a long a (あぁ) sound. E.g., mizukusai (水臭い watery) is pronounced mizukusaa (水臭ぁ). In the north-easterly parts of the dialect area, ai instead becomes a long e (えぇ). E.g., nai (ない there is not) is said nee (ねぇ). Among the coastal districts of the southern dialect area, ai is merged to a long i (い) sound, so that the soft interrogative sentence-ending particle kai (かい) is pronounced as kii (きぃ) and nai is said nii (にぃ). Across much of the dialect area, the diphthong ie (いえ) is merged to a long e sound, producing pronunciations like meeru (めぇる) instead of mieru (みえる to be able to see) and keeru (けぇる) instead of kieru (きえる to disappear). The diphthongs oi (おい) and ui (うい) do not experience merging, however. In Wakayama Prefecture, unlike in standard Japanese, the diphthong ei (えい) is not always merged to a long e sound. For example, sensei (せんせい teacher) has its final i clearly pronounced. This is shared with fairly distant dialects such some Izu Islands dialects and the Kyushu dialect group.

=== Consonants ===
The consonant sounds s, r and w may be omitted in the Kishu dialect. For example, the s in okoshita (起こした I woke him/her up) would be dropped to become okoita (起こいた), the r in bakkari (ばっかり nothing but) would be lost to become bakkai (ばっかい) and the w in wata (わた cotton plant) would be omitted and said ata (あた). When occurring directly after a shi (し) sound, a t may be replaced with an s sound, a trait scattered across the Kansai region in several pockets. For example, ashita (あした tomorrow) would be said ashisa (あしさ) (aisa (あいさ) is also possible) and hanashita (話した spoke) would become hanaisa (話いさ). Sporadic geminate consonant (small tsu (っ)) insertion in certain words can also be seen. For example, fukai (ふかい deep) is pronounced fukkai (ふっかい) and hoka ni (ほかに also) is said hokka ni (ほっかに).

=== Inter-pronunciation of za, da and ra ===
Speakers of the Kishu dialect in Wakayama Prefecture are noted for extensive use of the so-called za-da-ra henkan (ザダラ変換), which refers to the frequent inter-pronunciation of the mora located in the za (ざ) column, the da (だ) column the ra (ら) column. Most typically, words containing a mora from the za column will have that sound replaced with the corresponding mora in the da column, whilst words with a mora from the da column will in turn be replaced with the corresponding mora in the ra column, with the vice versa also possible but less common. The table below outlines this phenomenon, with the arrows indicating the direction of phonetic change.

Za column	Da column	Ra column	Example
Za (ざ) →	← Da (だ)→	← Ra (ら)	Karada (からだ body) → kadara (かだら)
Ji (じ) →	← Di (ぢ)→	← Ri (り)	-
Zu (ず) →	← Dzu (づ) →	← Ru (る)	-
Ze (ぜ) →	← De (で) →	← Re (れ)	Zenzen (ぜんぜん not at all) → denden (でんでん)
Zo (ぞ) →	← Do (ど) →	← Ro (ろ)	Douzou (どうぞう bronze statue) → doudou (どうどう)

Za-da-ra inter-pronouncing is common across the Kansai region but is considered most striking in the Kishu dialect. The origins of this phenomenon are thought to be that voiced s-starting mora (aka. za, ji, etc.) are phonetically close to affricatives (e.g., dza, di, etc.), which may then lose their fricative element to become plosive. E.g., za → dza → da. In turn, the plosive d-starting sounds may have their plosive element weakened to become closer to an r sound. E.g., da → ra. All in all, this produces the following interaction:

- za → [morphs to affricative] → dza → [loses affricative, becomes plosive] → da → [weakened plosive] → ra

The extent to which this occurs depends on the individual speaker, and is also influenced by whether a dialect speaker is speaking casually or more formally.

=== Yotsugana ===
There is some debate over whether the yotsugana (四つ仮名) are distinguished in the Kishu dialect. Some have indicated that they are fully distinguished in the southern part of Wakayama Prefecture, with the existence of both ji (じ) and di (ぢ) and zu (ず) and dzu (づ). Research from 1962 by Eiichi Murauchi, however, suggested that although this distinction once existed, it had already vanished from the dialect.

== Pitch accent ==
The pitch accent of the Kishu dialect within Wakayama Prefecture is almost unanimously Keihan in style, with traditional characteristics even older than those of Kyoto, Kobe or Osaka remaining in the Tanabe area (except for the former town of Hongu). In contrast, a stretch of land from Shingu in Wakayama as far as Kihoku in Mie Prefecture is renowned as having the most complex distribution of pitch accents in Japan. The different pitch accents found in the Kishu dialect and their areas of usage are shown below.

- Keihan-style – Spoken across all of Wakayama Prefecture except for Shingu, Hongu and Kitayama. Within the Shingu area, everywhere south of Miwasaki also possesses a Keihan-style pitch accent. In certain areas including Nachikatsuura, words that usually have a rising pitch on their first mora in the Keihan-style pitch accent may lose this rise. For example, kaze ga (かぜが the wind is…) would be pronounced kaze ga (かぜが).
- Tarui-style (type C) – Spoken in Hongu, with a similar version used in the central parts of Shingu.
- Kumano-style – Spoken in the southern part of Owase, the coastal part of Kumano, Mihama, Kiho and Takada. According to Haruhiko Kindaichi, this pitch accent is in fact two separate accents: the Kinomoto-style and Atawa-style pitch accents. Yukihiro Yamaguchi instead classified this two as the same.
- ‘Keihan-esque’-style – A pitch accent with similarities to the standard Keihan-style which is further divided into three sub-accents: the Nagashima-style spoken in Kihoku, the Owase-style spoken in the northern part of Owase and the Furue-style spoken in Furue, Owase.
- Nairin Tokyo-style – A pitch accent related to the Tokyo-style spoken in southern Nara Prefecture that is spoken in the mountains of Kumano and Kitayama.

== Grammar ==
=== Verbs and i-adjectives ===
Nidan conjugation of certain Ichidan verbs remains in the central parts of Wakayama Prefecture, particularly around Gobo and Tanabe, although which verbs are still considered Nidan varies depending on the area. There are also some verbs found in the Kishu dialect which do not exist in standard Japanese. For example, atakuru (あたくる) is used with the same meaning as ranbo suru (乱暴する to be violent) and orayuru (おらゆる) is an equivalent to sasaeru (支える to support).

In and around Ito district and Hashimoto, ru-ending Ichidan verbs are conjugated as if they are Godan verbs. As an example, for the negative form of verbs (usually -nai stem + n (ん) elsewhere in the dialect area), min (見ん do not see) becomes miran (見らん) and taben (食べん do not eat) becomes taberan (食べらん).

Generally, the conjunctive form of i-adjectives (-ku, -く) experience the insertion of a u (う) sound. E.g., akaku nai (赤くない) becomes akau nai (赤うない). However, when the word stem contains an a (あ) vowel sound, for example takai (たかい tall / high), the mora within which the a sound is found may morph into either a long o (おう) or long a (あぁ) sound. In the case of takai, this would make the standard Japanese takaku nai (たくない not high) become takou nai (たこうない) or takaa nai (たかぁない) as opposed to takau nai (たかうない).

=== Verbs of existence・Progressive and perfective aspects ===
In the coastal parts of Wakayama Prefecture as well as the plains alongside the Kinokawa River and in Minamimuro in Mie Prefecture, the verb aru (ある there is) is used for both living and non-living things, as opposed to iru (居る there is) for living things and aru for only non-living things. For example, sensei aru kai? (先生あるかい Is the teacher there?) as opposed to sensei iru kai (先生居るかい) or koko ni sensei wa nai (ここに先生はない He/she isn’t here). In the mountainous areas of Wakayama Prefecture, oru (おる) may be used in place of iru (いる) to indicate the existence of living things, and depending on the area, oru may also be used for non-living things. In recent years, however, usage of iru has been gradually spreading from the Kihoku area.

Like other West Japanese dialects, the Kishu dialect makes a distinction between the progressive and perfective aspect. Much like iru and aru in standard Japanese, it also makes use of aru and oru as modal verbs to express these aspects. Typically, in Western Japanese dialects the progressive aspect (used for ongoing actions, e.g., running) is formed from the -masu (-ます) stem of a verb + oru, whilst the perfective aspect (used for completed actions with an ongoing consequence, e.g., it has rained) is formed from the -masu stem + te oru (ておる). For the progressive aspect, in Wakayama city and the districts of Kaiso and Naga, [-te and -ta form stem + te ru] is most common, whilst in Ito district [-te and -ta form stem + toru], and in Arida district [-masu stem + yaru] are most common. In Mie Prefecture, the forms [-masu stem + yaru / yaaru] and [-masu stem + yoru] are used in Minamimuro and Kitamuro, respectively. Although these forms are the most common, there also exist numerous other forms, as shown below using the example verb furu (降る to rain).

Progressive aspect in the Kishu dialect (It is raining)

-Wakayama city, Kaiso and Naka: futteru (降ってる)

-Ito district: futtoru (降っとる)

-Arida district: furiyaru (降りやる)

-Minamimuro: furiyaru / furiyaaru (降りやる / 降りやぁる)

-Kitamuro: furiyoru (降りよる)

Other forms: fucchaaru (降っちゃぁる), fuccharu (降っちゃる), futtaaru (降ったぁる), futtaru (降ったる), furaru (降らる), furyouru (降りょうる).

For the perfective aspect, in Wakayama city and the districts of Kaiso and Naka, [-te and -ta stem + chaaru] is most used, whilst south of Hidaka district, [-te and -ta stem + taru] is the most widespread. In Mie Prefecture, [-te and -ta stem + taru / taaru / chaaru] and [-te and -ta stem + toru] are most common in Minamimuro and Kitamuro, respectively.

In recent years, the usage of [-te and -ta stem + iru] has proliferated in the dialect, likely because of mass media and the increasing standardisation of Japanese.

Along the coastal parts of the Kinan region in Wakayama Prefecture, an archaic form that uses [-masu stem + iru] remains in use (for example, omoi iru (思いいる I am thinking).

=== Bound auxiliaries ===
==== Copulas ====
Aside from the common Kansai dialect copulas, ya (や) and ja (じゃ), de (で) and jo (じょ) are also used. Among these, ja is most typically used by older speakers in mountainous parts of the dialect area. Below are some examples of these copulas in use.

- Sou da yo, aitsu ga kinou totta no da yo (そうだよ。あいつがきのうとったのだよ That’s right, he took it yesterday) could become sou jo, aitsu kin’no totta n jo (そうじょ。あいつきんのうとったんじょ).
- Kore wa watashi no hasami da. Kinou katta no da (これは私のはさみだ。きのう買ったのだ Those are my scissors. I bought them yesterday) could become kore washi no hasami de. Kinou kouta n de (これわしのはさみで。きのうこうたんで).

==== Negation ====
The bound auxiliaries -n (-ん), -hen (-へん), -sen (-せん), -yan (-やん) and -ran (-らん) are all used to express negation in the Kishu dialect, although -n is the most widely used. -yan is also found in the Mie and Nara dialects and is common across much of the Kishu dialect area, except for in more mountainous areas. -hen can attach in a wide variety of ways to the preceding verb, depending on verb type and nuance. For Godan verbs like kaku (書く to write), it attaches to the -nai stem (or slight variation of) to produce kakahen (書かへん don’t write) or kakehen (書けへん). For Ichidan verbs ending in -iru (-いる), the verb’s -masu stem can either change to an e sound, e.g., minai (みない don’t look) becomes meehen (めぇへん) or have a ya (や) inserted after the -masu stem and prior to -hen, e.g., minai becomes miyahen (みやへん). For Ichidan verbs ending in -eru (-える), the -masu stem has its sound either lengthened (denai (出ない don’t leave) becomes deehen (出ぇへん) or like for -iru ending Ichidan verbs has a ya inserted prior to -hen (denai becomes deyahen (出やへん). The irregular verb kuru (くる to come) is conjugated much the same as -iru ending Ichidan verbs. E.g., konai (こない) becomes either keehen (けぇへん) or kiyahen (きやへん). The irregular verb suru (する to do) is also conjugated similarly, so that shinai (しない do not) becomes either seehen (せぇへん) or shiyahen (しやへん). -ran is most common in mountainous areas and around Ito district. It can be considered as a ‘Godan-isation’ of Ichidan verbs due to how it attaches. For example, tabenai (食べない don’t eat) becomes taberan (食べらん).

==== Causative ====
For Godan verbs, the bound auxiliary -su (-す) attaches to the -nai stem, like in kakasu (書かす to make write) (kakaseru (書かせる) in standard Japanese). For all other verb types, including irregular verbs, the auxiliary -yasu (-やす) or -sasu (-さす) is attached instead. For example, misaseru (見させる to make look) becomes either miyasu (見やす) or misasu (見さす), kosaseru (こさせる to make come) becomes either kiyasu (きやす) or kosasu (来さす), and saseru (させる to make do) becomes either shiyasu (しやす) or sasu (さす). In Ito district, the causative form of Ichidan verbs may be conjugated as if they are Godan verbs, with -su (-す) added to the end. For example, miyasu or misasu would instead be said mirasu (見らす). In areas which retain Nidan conjugation rules, the bound auxiliary endings -suru (-する) and -sasuru (-さする) are used, attaching to the -nai stem of verbs. For example, kakasuru (書かする) and misasuru (見さする).

==== Passive・Potential ====
There are various bound auxiliaries used to express the passive and potential forms used in the Kishu dialect, with notable differences depending on region. For Godan verbs, the ending -reru (-れる) is attached to the -nai stem across most of the dialect area. For example, ikareru (行かれる has come (passive) or can go (potential)). For other verb types the endings -rareru (-られる) and -yareru (-やれる) are used. For example, taberareru (食べられる) and tabeyareru (食べやれる) (both get eaten (passive) or can eat (potential)). The irregular verb kuru is conjugated to korareru (来られる), kirareru (きられる) or kiyareru (きやれる) (all can come or has come), whilst suru is conjugated to serareru (せられる), shirareru (しられる) or sareru (される) (all gets done). In some cases, the r sound of the re (れ) in -rareru and -yareru may be dropped to form the alternative endings -eru (-える) (for Godan verbs), -raeru (-らえる) and -yaeru (-やえる) (for other verb types). In areas with Nidan verb conjugation rules, the auxiliaries -ruru (-るる) and -raruru (-らるる) are also used. In comparison with the auxiliaries listed above, it is noted that conjugating a particular verb into an -eru verb is more commonly used as a means of expressing potential in the Kishu dialect. For example, ikeru (行ける can go). In addition, the prefix you (よう) can also be used to express potential. For example, you iku (よう行く can go) or you ikan (よう行かん). An older variant of you, ee (えぇ), may also be found in some areas. In Shingu and south Minamimuro, the endings -eru (-える) and -ereru (-えれる) are also used, attaching to the -masu stem like in kieru (着える) or kiereru (着えれる) (both can wear).

==== Conjecture ====
For affirmative conjecture (darou (だろう probably) in standard Japanese), the auxiliaries -yarou (-やろう), -jarou (-じゃろう) and -rashii (-らしい) are used. Unlike in standard Japanese, a past affirmative conjectural auxiliary (ie. probably was) also exists: -tsurou (-つろう), which is primarily used in the mountainous regions of the dialect area.

For negative conjecture or volition, the auxiliary -mai (-まい) is used. Its method of attachment to verbs varies, with examples including: iku mai (行くまい), ikomai (行こまい), ikamai (行かまい) and ikahemai (行かへまい). Since other expressions like -nyaro (-んやろう) and -ntoko (-んとこ) are also used, the lack of usage of -mai itself is also considered a cause of this variation.

==== Imperatives ====
In Wakayama, the expressions -nsu (-んす) and -sansu (-さんす) are used to express an imperative or prohibition. For example, sensu na (せんすな) is an equivalent to suru na (するな don’t do) and misansee (見さんせぇ) is used as an equivalent to minasai yo (見なさいよ look (command)). In Tanabe and other areas, older women use -mattensu (-まってんす), -maitensu (-まいてんす) and -matten (-まってん), which attach to the -masu stem of verbs. These are all believed to be derived from -mashite desu (-ましてです), with desu (です) sometimes also being said as densu (でんす) in Tanabe and other areas.

=== Polite speech ===
The Kishu dialect (particularly in Tanabe and Shinguu) is noted for its lack (or occasionally complete absence) of equivalent words to the polite speech seen in other dialects. Put simply, regardless of an old-young, upperclassman-lowerclassman or boss-employee relationship, those of lower rank not using polite speech to those of higher rank is understood as customary and is accepted. In fact, using polite speech is often considered rude. Even at a national scale, this is an uncommon trend, seen only in the Tosa dialect and a few others.

Due to their lack of intuition regarding polite speech, Kishu natives who move to other prefectures often report difficulty in conversing. Since the spread of compulsory education, and along with an increasing assimilation into other Kansai (particularly Osaka) dialects, there has been an increasing number of Kishu dialect speakers who use both a ‘Standard Kansai dialect’ or their own native dialect depending on the situation.

On the other hand, the Kishu dialect does retain certain archaic honorific titles, with the most well-known being the second-person pronoun omae (お前 you). Omae may also be pronounced as oman (おまん) or omahan (おまはん) in the Kishu dialect to indicate a degree of familiarity. Even if pronounced as simply omae, this can carry either a neutral connotation like anata (あなた) or the same, rougher connotation found in other dialects. As these diverse usages of omae are no longer present in standard Japanese, Kishu dialect speakers are often misunderstood by those from other prefectures when using oman, omahan and omae.

=== Particles ===
==== Case-marking, binding and adverbial particles ====
In the mountainous parts of central and southern Wakayama Prefecture, the particle n (ん) is used as an equivalent to the nominative case-marking particle ga (が). In southern Mie Prefecture, the particles ga and wa (は) are either pronounced as ya (や) and a (あ), respectively, or merged with the noun to which they attach. For example, umi ga (うみが the sea is…) can become unmya (うんみゃ) and kutsu ga (くつが the shoes are…) may become kuttsa (くっつぁ). In this case, the distinction between ga and wa is lost phonetically. In Kumano, the accusative case-marking particle wo (を) is also merged with the preceding noun. Another particle, i (い), is used instead of the direction-marking particle he (へ). In Kihoku, Wakayama, the formula [B shika yoi] (Bしかよい) is used as an equivalent to the formula [A yori B ga yoi] (AよりBが良い B is better than A) to make a comparative statement. On the other hand, save for only southern Mie, the particles hoka (ほか), haka (はか) and hocha (ほちゃ) are used as an equivalent to the standard Japanese particle shika (しか only).

==== Conjunctive particles ====
The particle saka (さか) or sakai (さかい) is used as a resultative conjunction (kara (から) or node (ので) both because/so). Sakai is widely used across the Kansai region. In southern Mie, de (で), monde (もんで) and yotte (よって) are also used.

==== Sentence-ending particles ====
Various particles may be used in the Kishu dialect to express volition and/or persuasion. Most common is the particle ra (ら), which attaches to an o-morphed -nai stem of verbs, like in ikora (行こら). In the Muro region of Mie Prefecture, in addition to ra, rai (らい) is used as an attitudinal expression to express respect to those of higher status than oneself, and rare (られ) is used for those of equal or lower status. In Kihoku, Wakayama Prefecture, the particle sou (そう) is used to express volition or persuasion, e.g., tabeyosou (食べよそう let’s eat). In some areas the particles sora (そら) or sorayo (そらよ) are used instead.

In Wakayama Prefecture, the particles noshi (のし) or noushi (のうし) (derived from nou, moushi (のう、申し excuse me) are used mainly by older female speakers as respectful sentence-ending particles. They are the most respectful sentence-ending particles in the dialect and may also be used independently as interjectory particles. Usage of these particles is found in north-central Wakayama Prefecture, centred around Wakayama city, and including the districts of Naka, Kaiso, Arida and Hidaka (excluding the upland parts of these respective areas). Usage can also be found along the coastal region of Higashimuro in the south as well as along the Kumano River and the Minamimuro region of Mie Prefecture. The land in between these areas does not use these particles. There are a couple of phonological variations of noshi and noushi that may be also heard, including nora (のら), noura (のうら) and yoshi (よし). Of these, yoshi is noted for having little to no respectful nuance. Whereas na (な) is used with those of the same or lower status as oneself, the particle nou (のう) is used in many parts of Wakayama Prefecture to express a nuance of affection towards the listener. In Kitamuro, Mie Prefecture, however, na is considered more refined than nou.
