= Wakayama Prefectural Assembly =

Parliament of Wakayama, Japan

Wakayama Prefectural Assembly 和歌山県議会

Type
- Type: Unicameral

History
- Founded: 1878; 1947 (current local autonomy law)

Structure
- Seats: 42

Elections
- Last election: 9 April 2023
- Next election: 2027

Meeting place
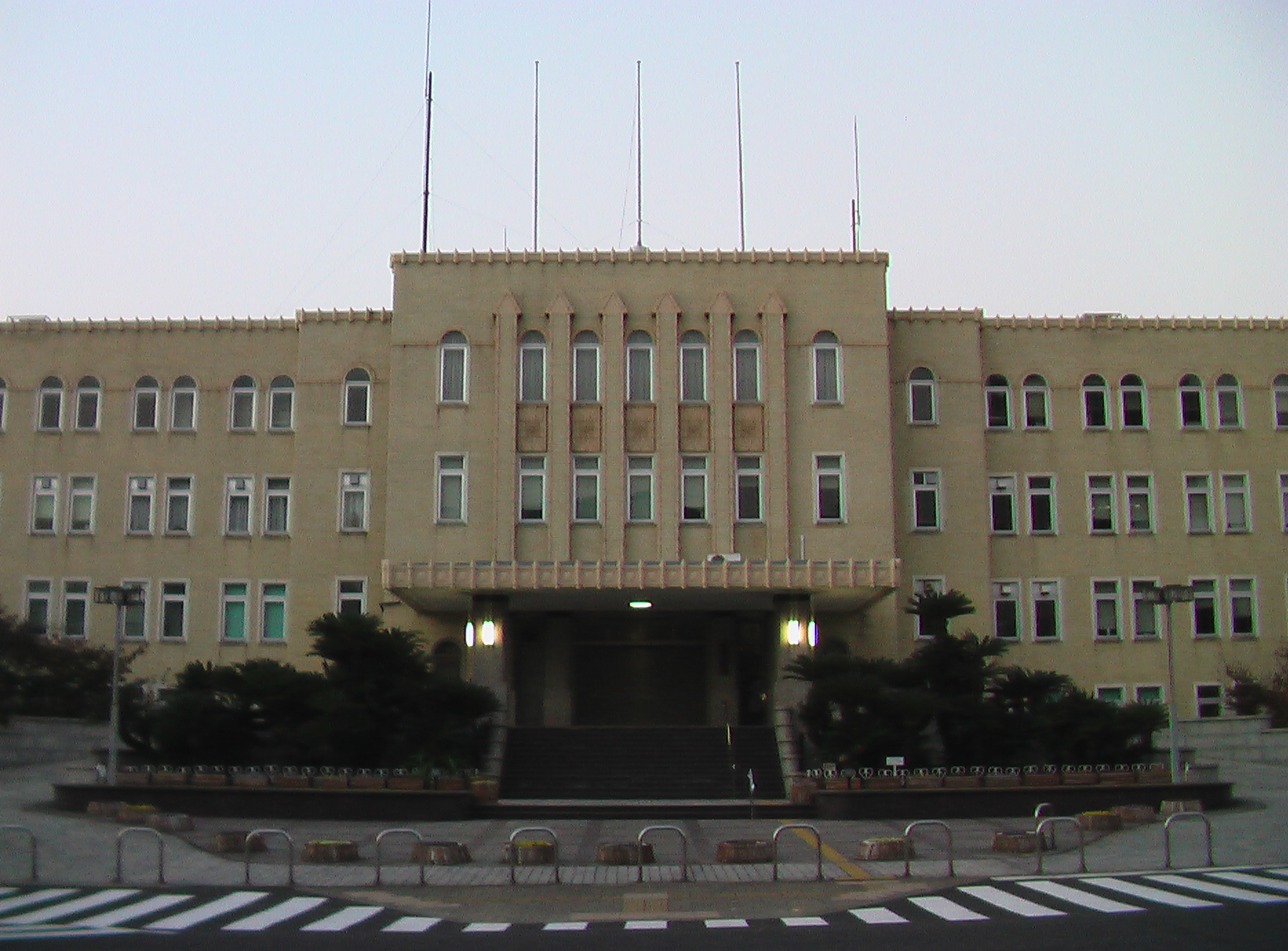
- Wakayama Prefectural Assembly Building, Wakayama City

Website
- www.pref.wakayama.lg.jp/prefg/200100/cms/www/index.html

The Wakayama Prefectural Assembly (和歌山県議会, Wakayama-ken Gikai) is the prefectural parliament of Wakayama Prefecture.

== Members ==
Below are the members of the assembly, as of 24 October 2019.

Constituency	Members	Party
Wakayama City	Mariko Fujimoto	Kaishin Club
Wakayama City	Ryūichi Hayashi	Nippon Ishin no Kai
Wakayama City	Masuhiro Ide	Jimintō Kengidan
Wakayama City	Hirotsugu Iwai	Komeito Kengidan
Wakayama City	Akihiro Katagiri	Kaishin Club
Wakayama City	Reiko Mori	Jimintō Kengidan
Wakayama City	Takashi Nagasaka	Kaishin Club
Wakayama City	Takuya Naka	Komeito Kengidan
Wakayama City	Takeshi Niijima	Jimintō Kengidan
Wakayama City	Noriko Okumura	JCP Kengidan
Wakayama City	Tarō Ozaki	Jimintō Kengidan
Wakayama City	Junichi Tada	Komeito Kengidan
Wakayama City	Eizō Ujita	Jimintō Kengidan
Wakayama City	Kōten Uraguchi	Kaishin Club
Wakayama City	Naoya Yamashita	Jimintō Kengidan
Kainan City and Kaisō-gun	Masaki Fujiyama	Jimintō Kengidan
Kainan City and Kaisō-gun	Tōru Nakanishi	Mushozoku no Kai
Kainan City and Kaisō-gun	Yōji Ozaki	Jimintō Kengidan
Hashimoto City	Hirohiko Iwata	Jimintō Kengidan
Hashimoto City	Kōsei Nakamoto	Jimintō Kengidan
Hashimoto City	Mineo Nakanishi	Jimintō Kengidan
Arida City	Hisato Tamaki	Jimintō Kengidan
Gobō City	Fumirō Kusumoto	JCP Kengidan
Tanabe City	Taiyū Suzuki	Jimintō Kengidan
Tanabe City	Tokuhisa Suzuki	Jimintō Kengidan
Tanabe City	Kazuki Taniguchi	Kaishin Club
Shingū City	Taishi Hamaguchi	Jimintō Kengidan
Kinokawa City	Takeshi Kishimoto	Jimintō Kengidan
Kinokawa City	Toshio Sugiyama	JCP Kengidan
Kinokawa City	Masahiko Yamada	Jimintō Kengidan
Iwade City	Tetsuya Kawabata	Jimintō Kengidan
Iwade City	Shinichi Kitayama	Jimintō Kengidan
Ito District	Tatsuo Hori	Jimintō Kengidan
Arida District	Toshihiro Yamaga	Jimintō Kengidan
Arida District	Kazumi Yoshii	Jimintō Kengidan
Hidaka District	Akihito Genso	Mushozoku no Kai
Hidaka District	Noboru Sakamoto	Jimintō Kengidan
Hidaka District	Tamihiro Tomiyasu	Jimintō Kengidan
Nishimuro District	Fuminari Akizuki	Jimintō Kengidan
Nishimuro District	Yoshikazu Takada	JCP Kengidan
Higashimuro District	Takeji Satō	Jimintō Kengidan
Higashimuro District	Yōichi Tani	Jimintō Kengidan
