= Wakayama 3rd district =

Japanese political constituency

Wakayama 3rd district is a former constituency of the House of Representatives in the Diet of Japan (national legislature), located in Wakayama Prefecture and consisted of Arida, Gobo, Shingu, and Tanabe cities and the Arida, Hidaka, Higashimuro, and Nishimuro districts. As of 2012, 298,296 eligible voters were registered in the district.

Since its creation in 1996, Wakayama 3rd district was represented by Toshihiro Nikai for the New Frontier Party (NFP), the Conservative Party, the New Conservative Party and the Liberal Democratic Party (LDP). Nikai, a former Transport, Hokkaido and Economy minister, is a member of the LDP's Ibuki faction since his own faction of former Conservative Party members dissolved in 2009.

Kimiyoshi Tamaki, a longtime Wakayama prefectural representative, failed to unseat Nikai in the 2009 election that brought the Democratic Party a landslide win. He was safely elected in the Kinki proportional representation block where all Democratic party list candidates managed to secure a seat in the House.

Before the 1994 electoral reform, the area had been part of Wakayama 2nd district where three, later two representatives were elected by single non-transferable vote.

The district was abolished as a part the 2022 reapportionment. All the municipalities in the district became part of the Wakayama 2nd district.

== List of representatives ==
Election	Representative	Party	Notes
1996	Toshihiro Nikai	NFP	joined LP after the dissolution of the NFP in 2000. After leaving LP, joined the CP.
2000	Toshihiro Nikai	CP	joined NCP in 2002.
2003	Toshihiro Nikai	NCP	merged into LDP in 2003.
2005	Toshihiro Nikai	LDP	
2009	Toshihiro Nikai	LDP	
2012	Toshihiro Nikai	LDP	
2014	Toshihiro Nikai	LDP	
2017	Toshihiro Nikai	LDP	
2021	Toshihiro Nikai	LDP	Constituency abolished

== Election results ==
2021
Party	Candidate	Age	Votes	%	±%	Defeat rate	Supports	Notes
LDP	Toshihiro Nikai	82	102,834	69.34%	－3.61%	ー	Kōmeitō	
JCP	Yoshihiro Hatano	61	20,692	13.95%	ー	20.12%	SDP	
Kunimori	Nana Honma	52	19,034	12.83%	ー	18.51%		
Independent	Hideki Negoro	51	5,745	3.87%	ー	5.59%		

2017
Party	Candidate	Age	Votes	%	±%	Defeat rate	Supports	Notes
LDP	Toshihiro Nikai	78	109,488	72.95%	－3.55%	ー	Kōmeitō	
JCP	Fumirō Kusumoto	63	40,608	27.05%	ー	37.09%	SDP	

11.96%
2014
Party	Candidate	Age	Votes	%	±%	Defeat rate	Supports	Notes
LDP	Toshihiro Nikai	75	108,257	76.50%	+16.07%	ー	Kōmeitō	
JCP	Yasuhisa Hara	63	33,260	23.50%				
30.72%								

3.81%
2012
Party	Candidate	Age	Votes	%	±%	Defeat rate	Supports	Notes
LDP	Toshihiro Nikai	73	112,916	60.43%	+8.37%	ー	Kōmeitō	
JSP	Daisuke Yamashita	45	52,358	28.02%	ー	46.37%		
JCP	Yasuhisa Hara	61	21,570	11.54%				
19.10%								

2009
Party	Candidate	Age	Votes	%	±%	Defeat rate	Supports	Notes
LDP	Toshihiro Nikai	70	117,237	52.06%	－14.36%	ー	Kōmeitō	
DP	Kimiyoshi Tamaki	54	102,342	45.44%	ー	87.29%		elected in the Kinki block.
HRP	Yūko Minato	26	5,634	2.50%	ー	4.81%		

2005
Party	Candidate	Votes	%	±%
LDP	Toshihiro Nikai	145,735		
DPJ	Terushige Manabe	53,532		
JCP	Minoru Ueda	20,140		
Turnout		226,653	72.48	

2003
Party	Candidate	Votes	%	±%
New Conservative Party	Toshihiro Nikai	148,274		
JCP	Minoru Ueda	40,930		
Turnout		205,613	65.26	

2000
Party	Candidate	Votes	%	±%
Conservative Party	Toshihiro Nikai	138,527		
Independent	Riki Azuma	55,546		
JCP	Tsutomu Hayashi	25,516		

1996
Party	Candidate	Votes	%	±%
NFP	Toshihiro Nikai	115,681		
LDP	Minoru Noda	101,074		
JCP	Yasuhisa Hara	18,155		
