= Kōya-Ryūjin Quasi-National Park =

Quasi-national park in Nara and Wakayama prefecture, Japan

- 高野竜神国定公園
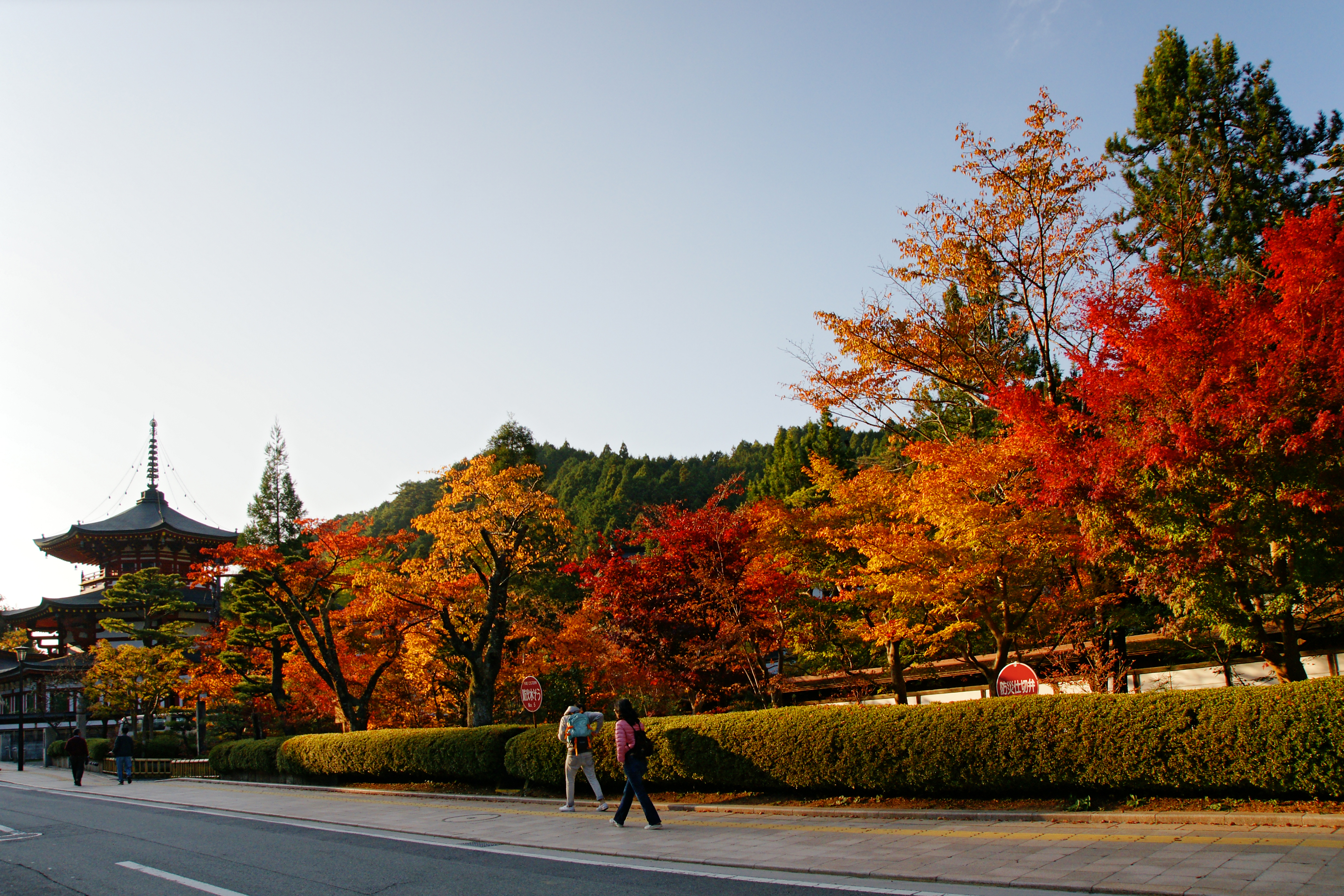
- Kōyasan

- Location within Japan
- Location: Nara/Wakayama Prefecture, Japan
- Coordinates: 34°00′04″N 135°27′11″E
- Area: 192 km^{2} (74 sq mi)
- Established: 13 March 1967

Kōya-Ryūjin Quasi-National Park (高野竜神国定公園, Kōya-Ryūjin Kokutei Kōen) is a Quasi-National Park in Nara and Wakayama Prefectures, Japan. It was established in 1967.

== Places of interest ==
- Kōya-san
- Ryujin Onsen (龍神温泉), connected with the legend of Anchin and Kiyohime
- Mount Gomadan (護摩壇山)

== Related municipalities ==
- Nara: Nosegawa, Totsukawa
- Wakayama: Aridagawa, Katsuragi, Kōya, Tanabe

== See also ==
- List of national parks of Japan
- Sacred Sites and Pilgrimage Routes in the Kii Mountain Range
- Kōyasan chōishi-michi
