= Kitayama =

Kitayama 北山村
- Village
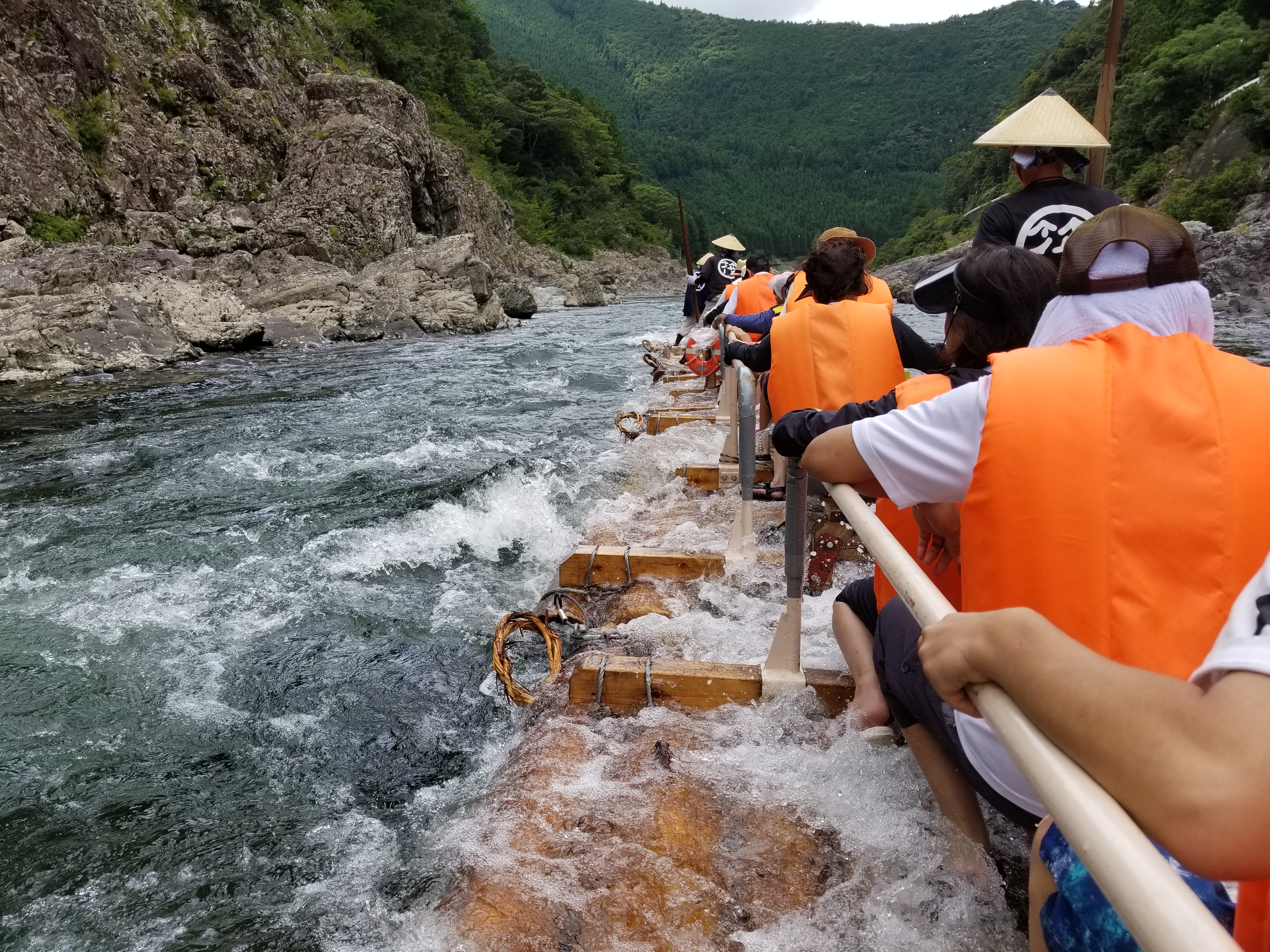
- A raft river boat progress in Kitayama River

- Flag Emblem

- Location of Kitayama in Wakayama Prefecture

- Location in Japan
- Coordinates: 33°56′N 135°58′E
- Country: Japan
- Region: Kansai
- Prefecture: Wakayama Prefecture
- District: Higashimuro

Area
  - Total: 48.21 km^{2} (18.61 sq mi)

Population (October 1, 2016)
  - Total: 432
  - Density: 8.96/km^{2} (23.2/sq mi)
- Time zone: UTC+09:00 (JST)
- Website: www.vill.kitayama.wakayama.jp

Kitayama (北山村, Kitayama-mura) is an exclave village that belongs to Higashimuro District, Wakayama Prefecture, Japan, but is located on the border between Mie and Nara Prefectures. It lies along the Kitayama River and has become a popular spot for log rafting.

As of 2016, the village has an estimated population of 432 and a density of 9 persons per km^{2}. The total area is 48.21 km^{2}.

Kitayama is the only remaining village in Wakayama Prefecture. Kitayama is known in Japan for growing a fruit called jabara, which is considered a potent cure for hay fever.

== History ==
Kitayama has a long history associated with logging, cutting trees, and sending the timber to be sold in nearby Shingū. When the transition from the Edo period to the modern era of prefectures occurred, the people of Kitayama desired to remain a part of Wakayama prefecture due to their close connections with Shingu City, and as a result this request was granted and the village remains an exclave. In 2005, there were plans for the village to merge with Shingu, but those plans were cancelled.

== Transportation ==
=== Highway ===
- Japan National Route 169

== See also ==
- List of enclaves and exclaves
