= Ryujin Onsen =

Thermal spring in Wakayama Prefecture, Japan

Coordinates: 33.956°N 135.562°E

Ryūjin Onsen 龍神温泉
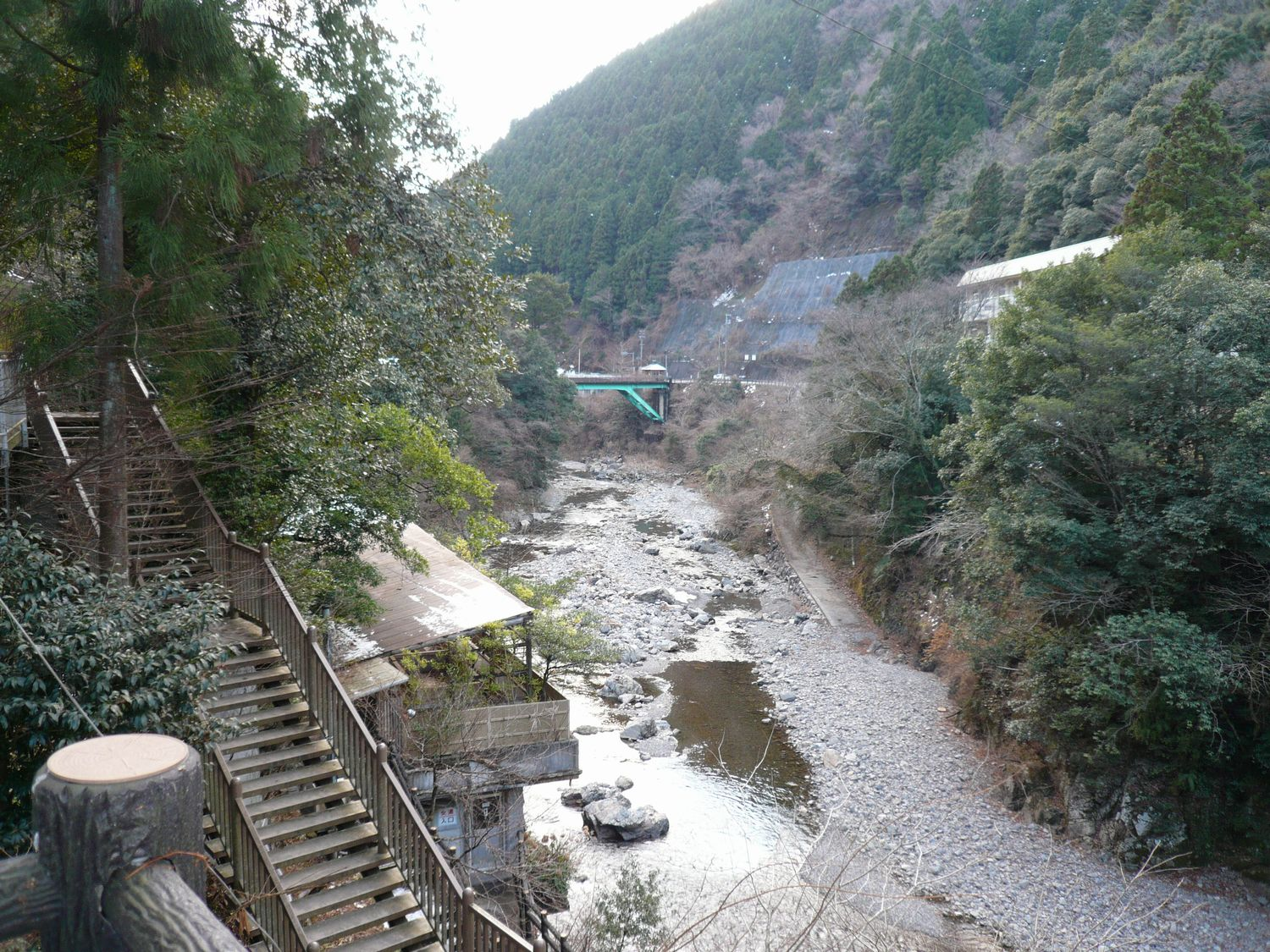
- Ryūjin Onsen near the Hidakagawa river
- Interactive map of Ryūjin Onsen 龍神温泉
- Location: Ryūjin, Wakayama Prefecture, Japan

Ryūjin Onsen (龍神温泉) is an onsen (hot spring) located in Ryūjin village, now a part of Tanabe, Wakayama City in Wakayama Prefecture, Japan. Ryūjin Onsen was discovered in the 7th century by En no Gyōja, the founder of Shugendō. Kōbō Daishi, founder of Shingon Buddhism visited the spot in the 9th century. During the Edo period (1603-1868), the onsen was used as a resort area by the Tokugawa ruling family, whose castle was in Wakayama city. Today there are old Japanese inns (ryokans) using the names Kamigoten (Royal Palace) and Shimogoten (Lower Lodgings), from the old feudal system. It is said to be the third best onsen for beautifying your skin in Japan.

== See also ==
- Kōya-Ryūjin Quasi-National Park
