= Ryūjin, Wakayama =

Dissolved municipality in Wakayama prefecture, Japan

Ryūjin (龍神村, Ryūjin-mura)

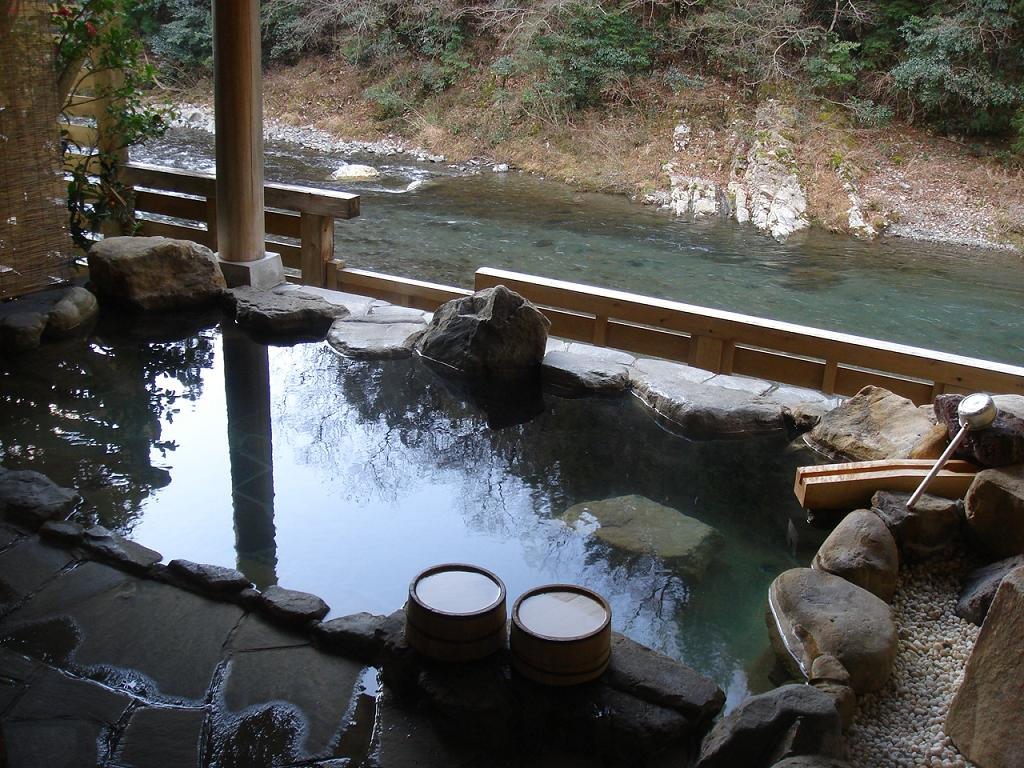
Ryujin

was a village located in Hidaka District, Wakayama Prefecture, Japan.

== Population ==
As of 2003, the village had an estimated population of 4,416 and a density of 17.31 persons per km^{2}. The total area was 255.13 km^{2}.

== History ==
On May 1, 2005, Ryūjin, along with the town of Nakahechi, the village of Ōtō (both from Nishimuro District), and the town of Hongū (from Higashimuro District), was merged into the expanded city of Tanabe.

== Attractions ==
A big tourist attraction is the local Ryujin Onsen founded in 7th century.
