= Shingū Castle =

Castle ruins in Shingū, Wakayama, Japan

- 新宮城
- Shingū, Wakayama Prefecture, Japan
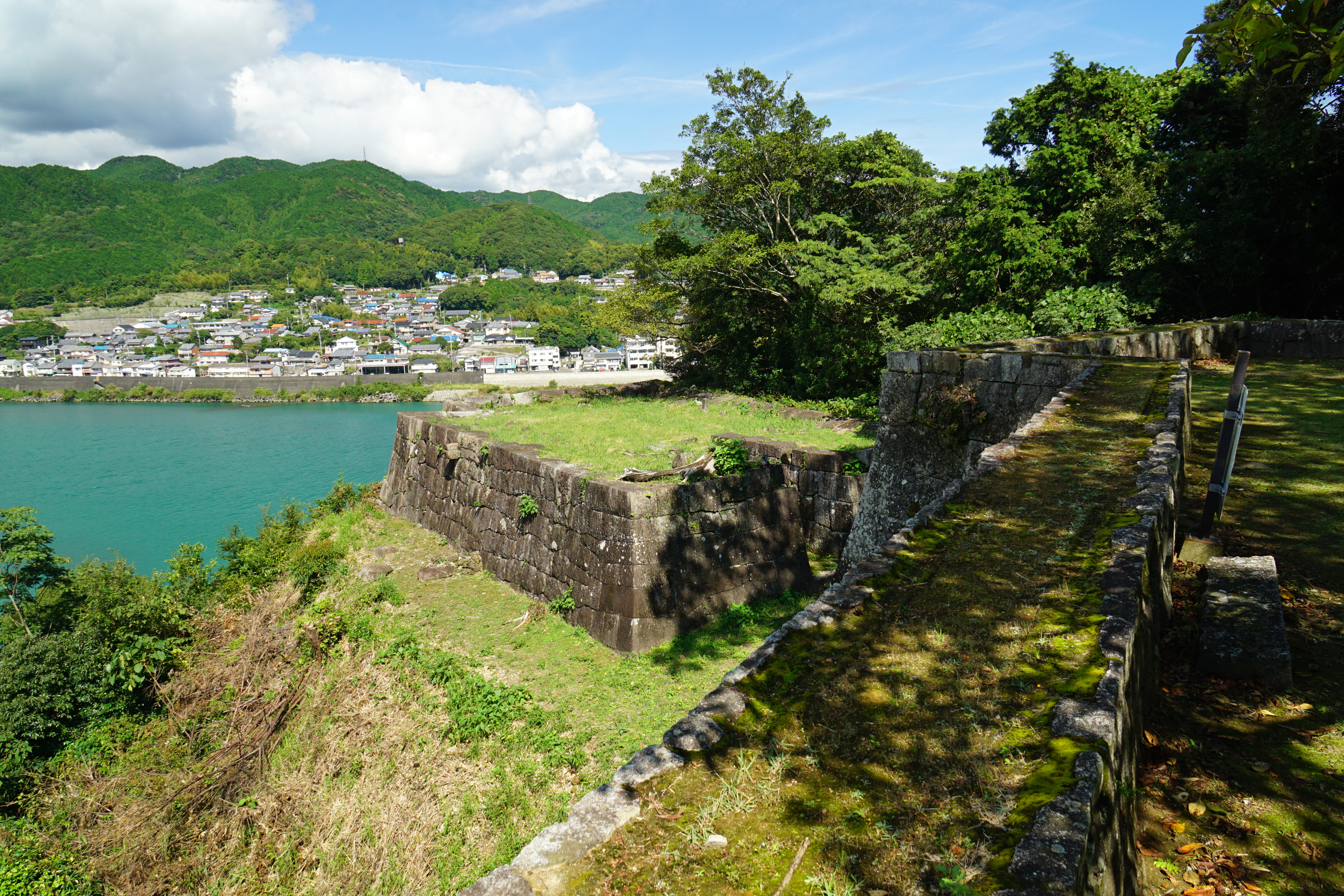
- View from the main enclosure

Site information
- Type: hirayama-style Japanese castle
- Open to the public: yes

Location
- Coordinates: 33°43′47.7″N 135°59′32.9″E

Site history
- Built: 1618
- Built by: Asano Tadayoshi
- In use: Edo period
- Demolished: 1873

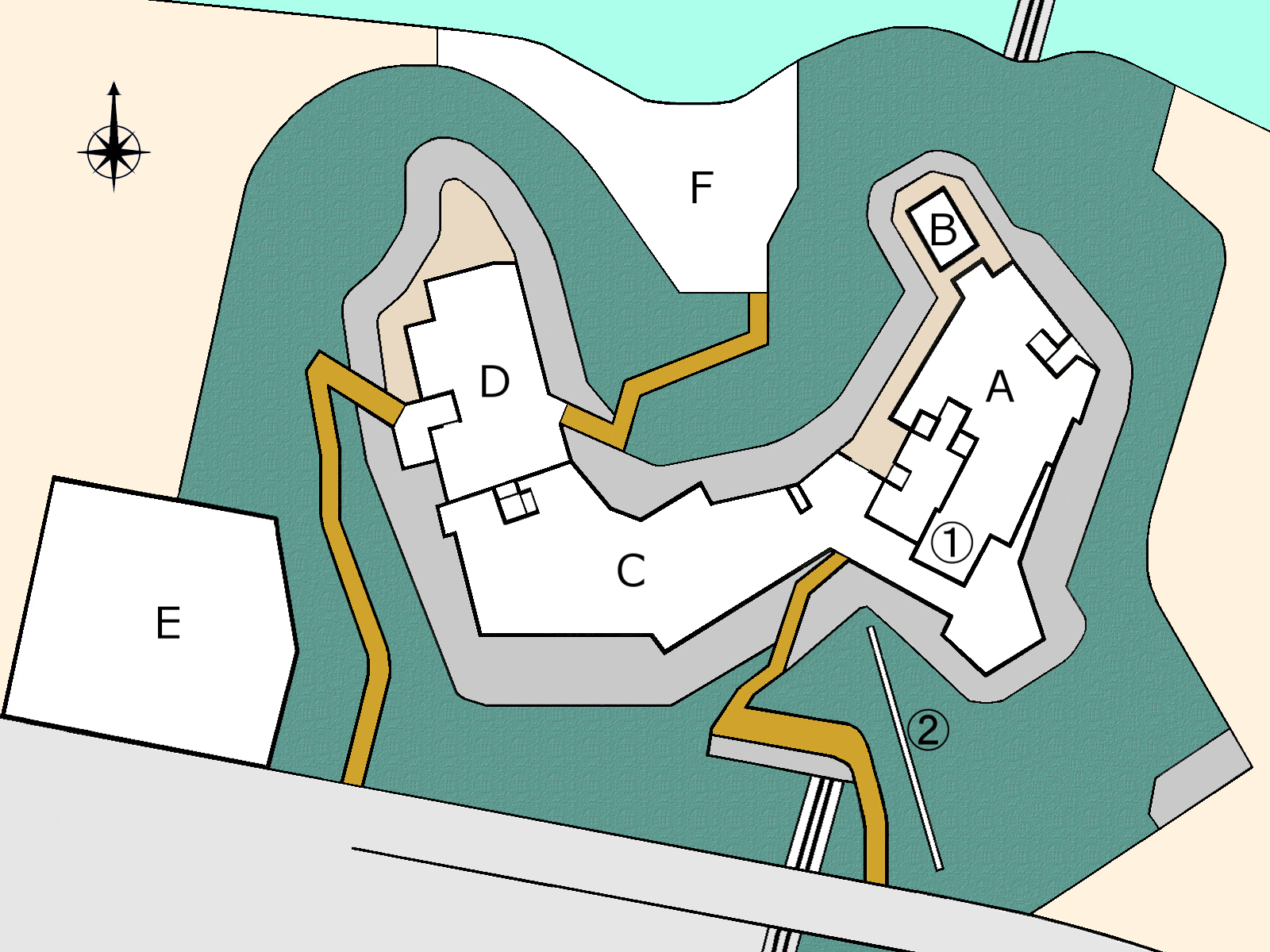
layout drawing of Shingū Castle A. Honmaru B. Demaru C. Kanenomaru D. Matsunomaru E. Ninomaru F. Mizunote ① Castle tower ② Cable car trace

Shingū Castle (新宮城, Shingū-jō) is a Japanese castle located in the city of Shingū, southern Wakayama Prefecture, Japan. At the end of the Edo period, Shingū Castle was home to a cadet branch of the Mizuno clan, hereditary karō of Kishū Domain. Its ruins, along with the clan cemetery for the Mizuno clan, were designated a National Historic Site in 2003. The castle is also called the Tankaku-jō (丹鶴城) or the Okimi-jō (沖見城).

== History ==
Shingū Castle is located a hill by the mouth of Kumano River in the southeastern extremity of Wakayama. From the Kamakura period, Shingū was a port city from which timber floated down the Kumano River was taken to Osaka and other locations for sale, and was gateway to the Kumano Sanzan shrines, an important pilgrimage destination. The local Shingū clan claimed descent from Minamoto no Yukiie and were also a naval power who assisted Minamoto no Yoritomo in the Genpei War. However, in the Muromachi period, the Shingū were replaced by the Horinouchi clan, who under Horinouchi Ujiyoshi, submitted to Oda Nobunaga, and later Toyotomi Hideyoshi. After Hideyoshi's death, Ujiyoshi supported the Western Army at the Battle of Sekigahara and was thus dispossessed by Tokugawa Ieyasu.

Under the Tokugawa Shogunate, Kii Province was awarded to Asano Yukinaga. As the Kumano region was so distance from the capital of the province at Wakayama, Asano started to build a branch castle on Tankakuyama in Shingū in 1601. The castle was to be abandoned in 1616 when the shogunate issued a proclamation that there could be only one castle per domain; however, the Asano received a special exemption from the ruling. In 1619, the Asano were transferred to Hiroshima Domain, and Kii Province was given to Tokugawa Yorinobu, the 10th son of Tokugawa Ieyasu, and one of the gosanke, or three cadet branches of the Tokugawa clan who could provide a candidate for Shogun should the main line of descent fail. Kishū Domain had five hereditary karō, each of whom had a kokudaka equal to, or greater than, many of the smaller daimyō. A cadet branch of the Mizuno clan was the hereditary karō, based in Shingū, with a kokudaka of 35,000 koku and Mizuno Shigeyoshi completed construction of the castle in 1633.

The castle extends on the hill in a rough "U"-shape. The central area is 50 by 30 meters on the eastern half of the hill, and contained the tenshu and a yagura watchtower. The entrance was protected by a winding path with many dead ends through several enclosures with stone walls and dry moats. The Kumano River forms a natural moat protecting the rear of the castle, whose fortifications extend to the water's edge and include a port on the river with warehouses.

The Mizuno clan continued to rule from Shingū Castle to the Meiji Restoration. In 1873, per orders of the Meiji government all remaining structures of the castle were demolished. All that remain today are remnants of stone walls overlooking the river and ocean. In 1952, the site of the castle became privately owned land, and a kindergarten and hotel were constructed on the site of the Ni-no-maru enclosure, with a cable car running up the slope to the ruins of the inner enclosure as a tourist attraction. This cable car ceased operation in 1980 and was demolished in the 1990s, and much of the site was re-acquired by the city government and has become "Tankaku-jo Park". There are ongoing discussions to reconstruct the tenshu.

The Mizuno clan cemetery is located approximately one kilometer to the south of the castle site, and is part of the National Historic Site designation.

In 2017, the castle was listed as one of the Continued Top 100 Japanese Castles.

The castle is a 15-minute walk from Shingū Station on the JR Kisei Main Line, whose tracks cut across the castle grounds in a tunnel.

== Gallery ==
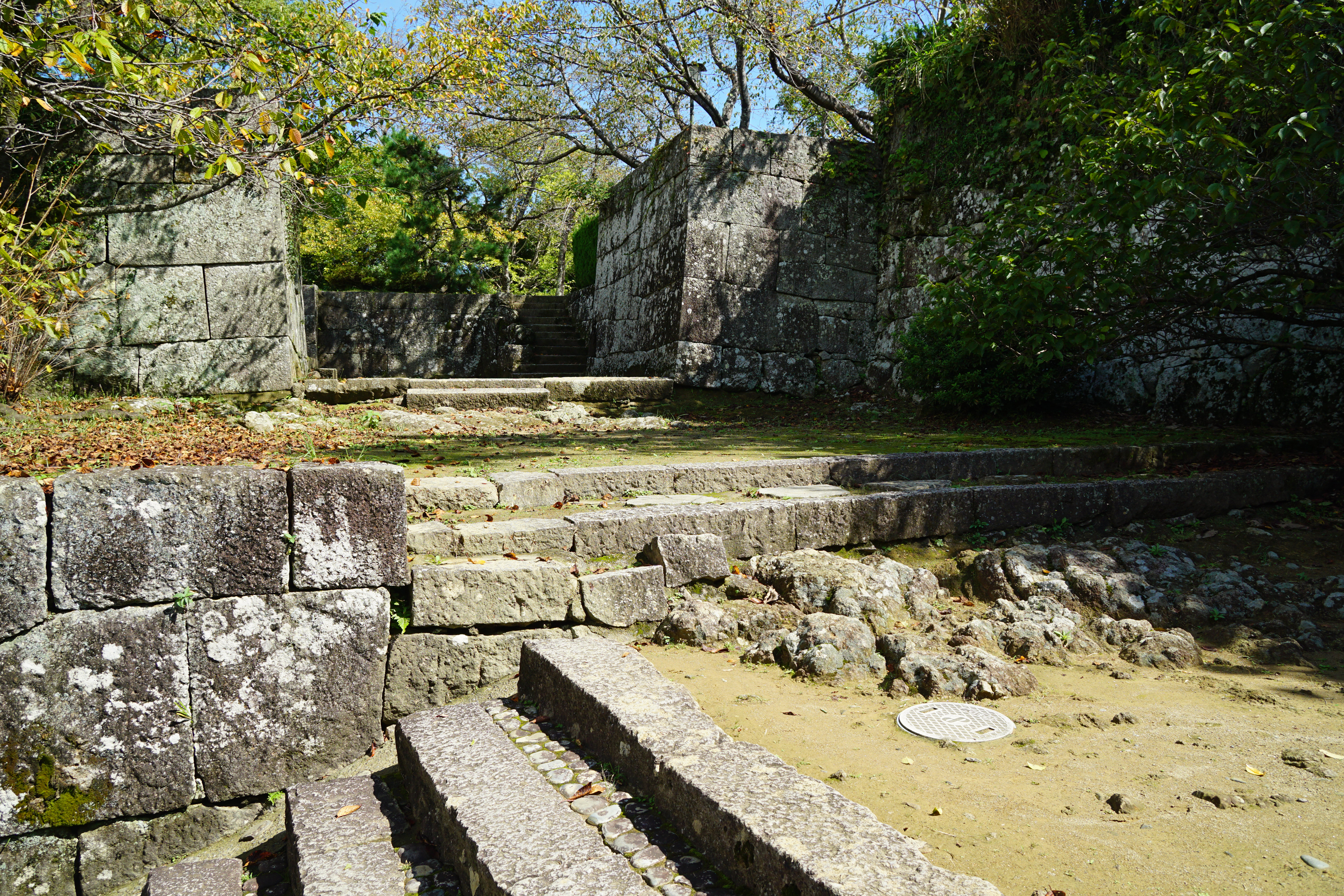
Site of the Otemon Gate to the main enclosure

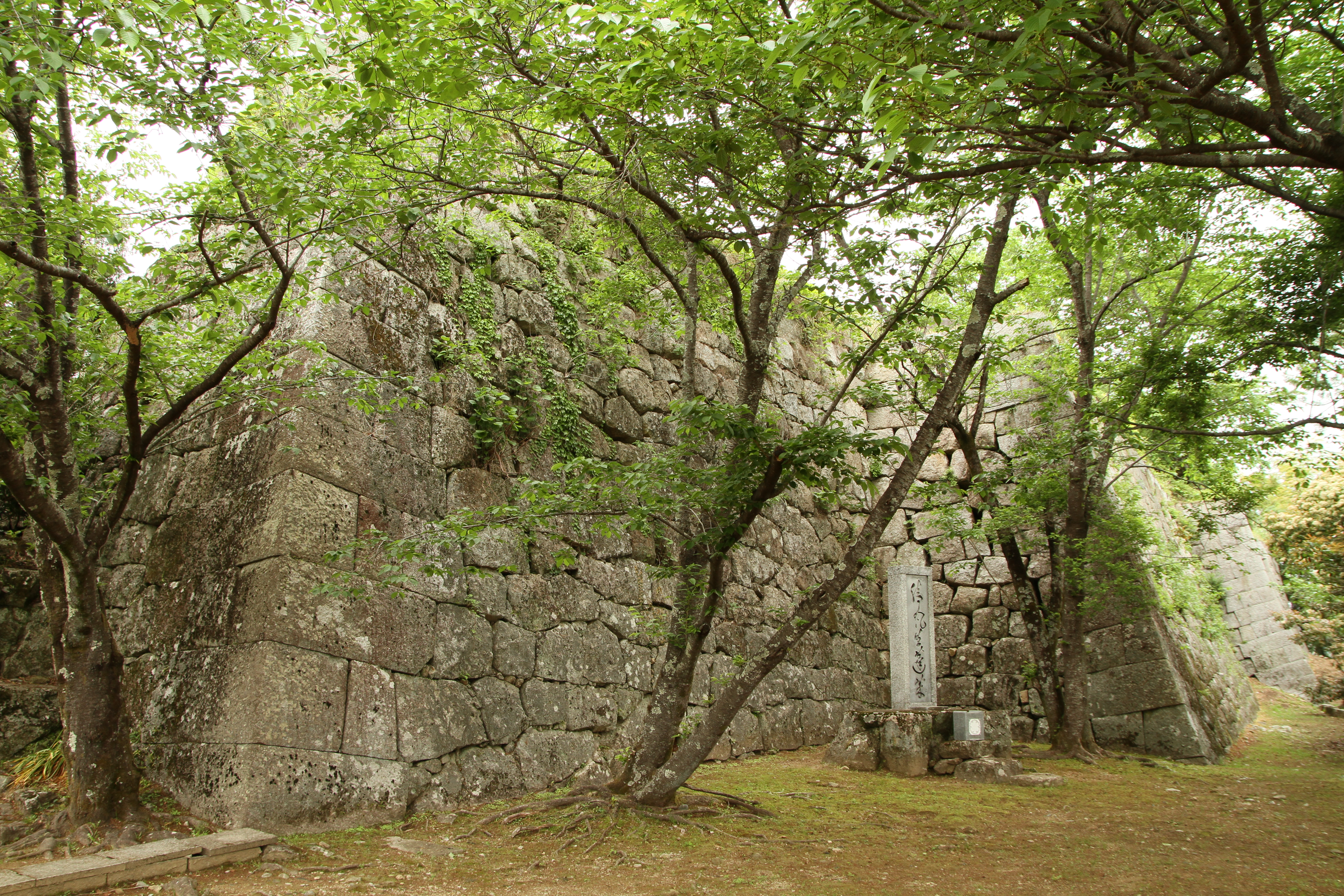
Walls of the main enclosure

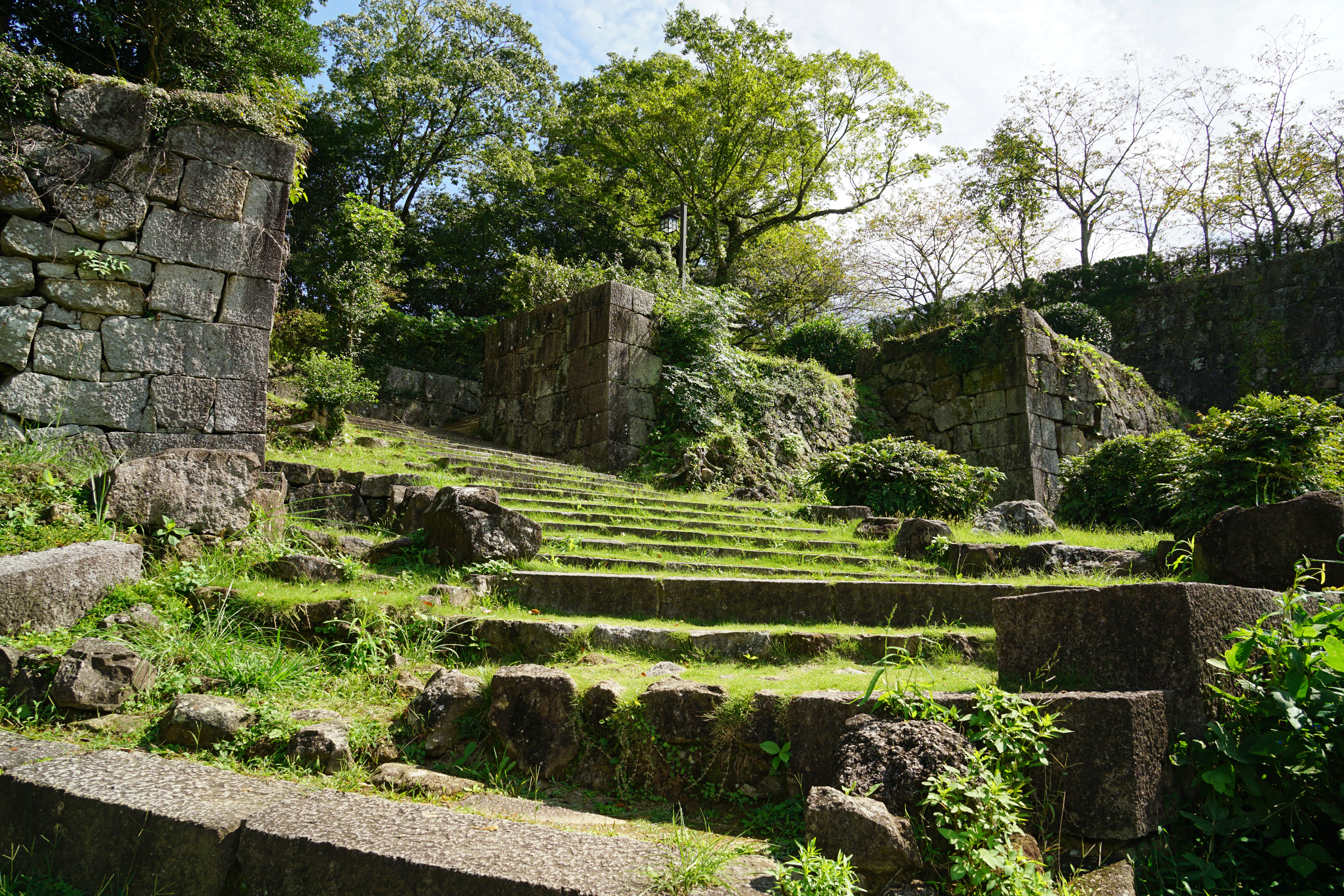
Ruins of the Matsu-no-maru gate

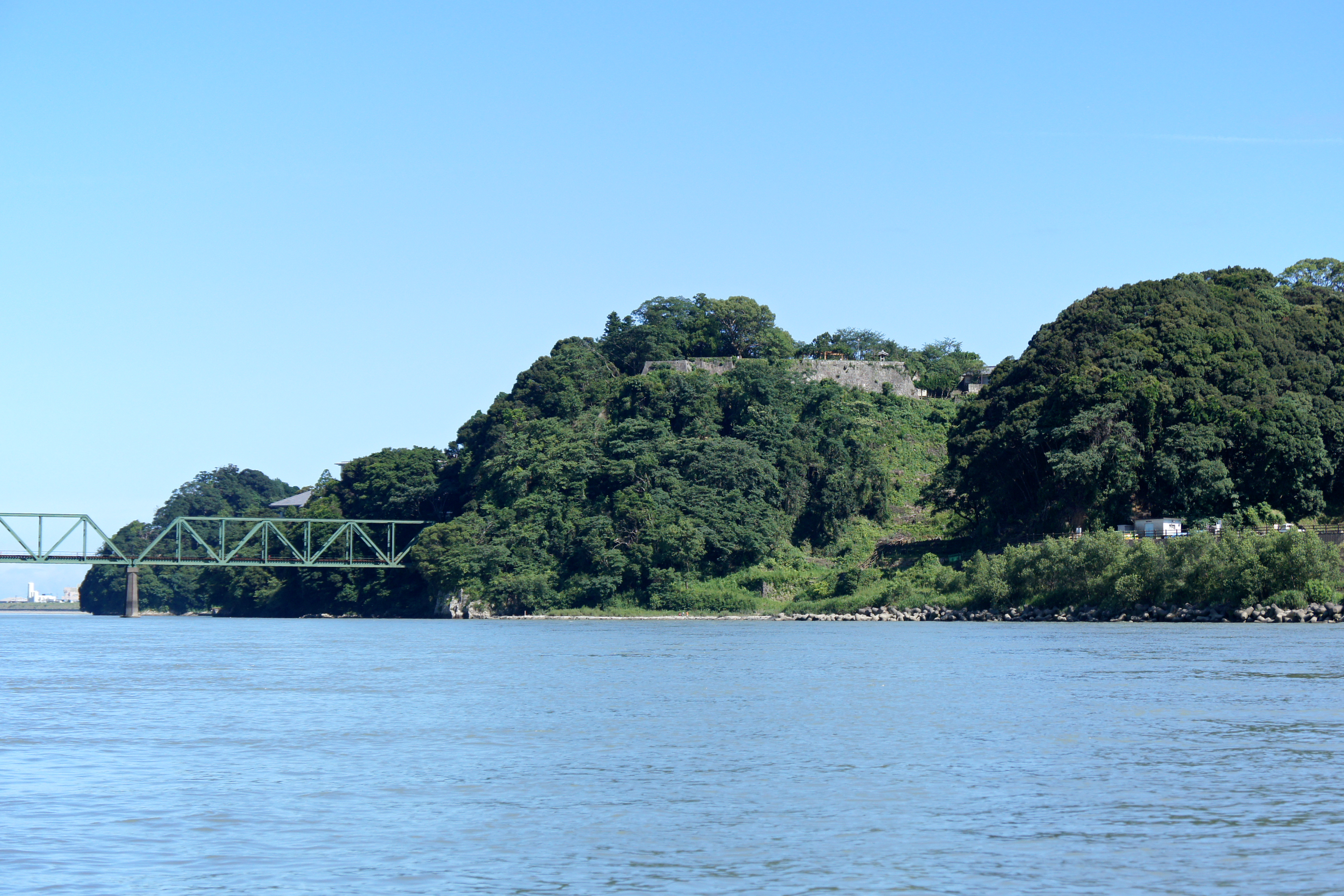
Shingū Castle ruins from the Kumano River

== See also ==
- List of Historic Sites of Japan (Wakayama)

== Literature ==
- De Lange, William (2021). An Encyclopedia of Japanese Castles. Groningen: Toyo Press. pp. 600 pages. ISBN 978-9492722300.
- Schmorleitz, Morton S. (1974). Castles in Japan. Tokyo: Charles E. Tuttle Co. pp. 144–145. ISBN 0-8048-1102-4.
- Motoo, Hinago (1986). Japanese Castles. Tokyo: Kodansha. ISBN 0-87011-766-1.
- Mitchelhill, Jennifer (2004). Castles of the Samurai: Power and Beauty. Tokyo: Kodansha. ISBN 4-7700-2954-3.
- Turnbull, Stephen (2003). Japanese Castles 1540–1640. Osprey Publishing. ISBN 1-84176-429-9.
