= Nakahechi =

Dissolved municipality in Wakayama Prefecture, Japan

Nakahechi (Japanese: 中辺路町, Nakahechi-chō, pronounced [nakahetɕi tɕoː]) was a town located in Nishimuro District, Wakayama Prefecture, Japan.

As of 2003, the town had an estimated population of 3,587 and a density of 16.92 persons per km^{2}. The total area was 211.95 km^{2}.

On May 1, 2005, Nakahechi, along with the village of Ryūjin (from Hidaka District), the village of Ōtō (also from Nishimuro District), and the town of Hongū (from Higashimuro District), was merged into the expanded city of Tanabe.
