= Ōtō, Wakayama =

Ōtō 大塔村
- Village
- Interactive map of Ōtō
- Country: Japan
- Prefecture: Wakayama
- District: Nishimuro
- Merged: May 1, 2005 (now part of Tanabe)

Area
  - Total: 219.06 km^{2} (84.58 sq mi)

Population (2003)
  - Total: 3,280
  - Density: 14.97/km^{2} (38.8/sq mi)
- Time zone: UTC+09:00 (JST)
- Website: Official village website (in Japanese)

Ōtō (大塔村, Ōtō-mura) was a village located in Nishimuro District, Wakayama Prefecture, Japan.

As of 2003, the village had an estimated population of 3,280 and a density of 14.97 persons per km^{2}. The total area was 219.06 km^{2}.

On May 1, 2005 Ōtō, along with the village of Ryūjin (from Hidaka District), the town of Nakahechi (also from Nishimuro District), and the town of Hongū (from Higashimuro District), was merged into the expanded city of Tanabe.

Ōtō is made up of 3 smaller areas (hamlets/localities) within the village boundary. The areas are called Ayukawa, Tomisato and Mikawa.
