= Hikigawa =

Former town in Wakayama Prefecture, Japan

Hikigawa 日置川町 ひきがわちょう
- Town
- Country: Japan
- Region: Kansai
- Prefecture: Wakayama
- District: Nishimuro
- Merged: March 1, 2006

Area
  - Total: 136.31 km^{2} (52.63 sq mi)

Hikigawa (日置川町, Hikigawa-chō) was a town located in Nishimuro District, Wakayama Prefecture, Japan.

As of 2003, the town had an estimated population of 4,594 and a density of 33.70 persons per km^{2}. The total area was 136.31 km^{2}.

On March 1, 2006, Hikigawa was merged into the expanded town of Shirahama.
