= Hongū =

Village in Wakayama Prefecture, Japan

Coordinates: 33°50′17.3″N 135°46′23.2″E

Hongū (本宮町, Hongū-chō) was a village located in Higashimuro District, Wakayama Prefecture, Japan.

As of 2003, the town had an estimated population of 3,759 and a population density of 18.42 persons per km^{2}. The total area was 204.06 km^{2}.

On May 1, 2005, Hongū, along with the village of Ryūjin (from Hidaka District), the town of Nakahechi, and the village of Ōtō (both from Nishimuro District), was merged into the expanded city of Tanabe.
