= Koza, Wakayama =

Dissolved municipality in Wakayama prefecture, Japan

Koza (古座町, Koza-chō) was a coastal town located at the mouth of the Kozagawa river in Higashimuro District, Wakayama Prefecture, Japan.

In 2003, the town had an estimated population of 5,587 and a density of 121.43 persons per km^{2}. The total area was 46.01 km^{2}.

On April 1, 2005, Koza was merged into the expanded town of Kushimoto (formerly from Nishimuro District, now within Higashimuro District).
