= Hanazono, Wakayama =

Dissolved municipality in Wakayama prefecture, Japan

Hanazono (花園村, Hanazono-mura) was a village located in Ito District, Wakayama Prefecture, Japan.

As of 2003, the village had an estimated population of 573 and a density of 12.08 persons per km^{2}. The total area was 47.44 km^{2}.

On October 1, 2005, Hanazono was merged into the expanded town of Katsuragi.
