= Kumanogawa, Wakayama =

Dissolved municipality in Wakayama prefecture, Japan

Kumanogawa (熊野川町, Kumanogawa-chō) was an exclave town that belongs to Higashimuro District, Wakayama, Japan, but was located on the border between Mie and Nara prefectures.

As of 2003, the town had an estimated population of 1,972 and a density of 11.24 persons per km^{2}. The total area was 175.47 km^{2}.

On October 1, 2005, Kumanogawa was merged into the expanded city of Shingū.
