= Tanabe, Wakayama =

Tanabe 田辺市
- City
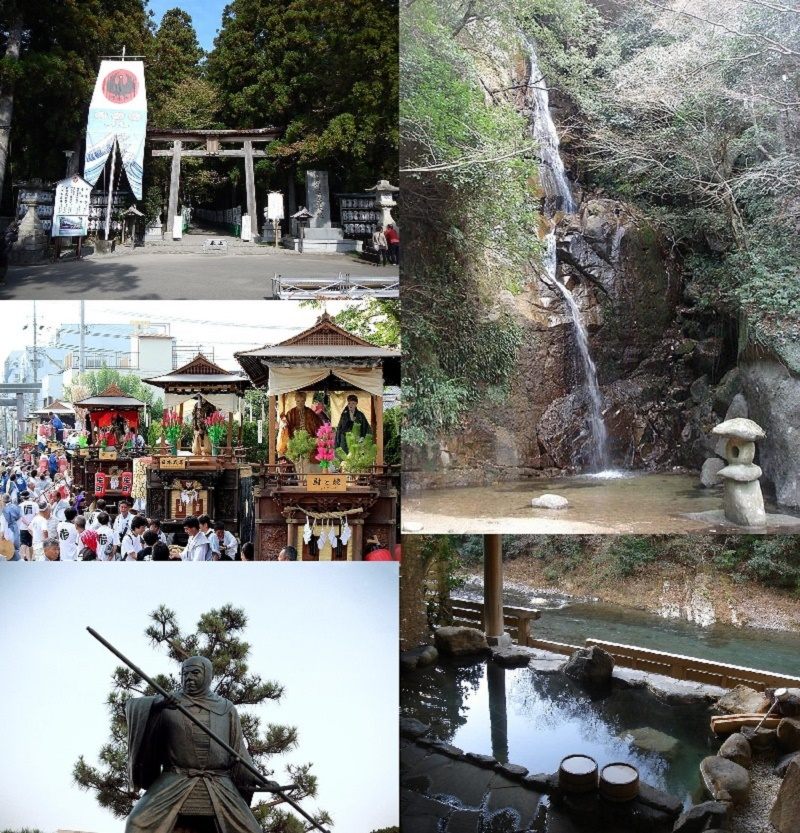
- Left:Kumano Hongū Taisha, Kumano Festival, held on every July, Statue of Musashibō-Benkei, Right:Kizetsu Gorge, Ryūjin Spa (all item for above to bottom)

- Flag Seal

- Location of Tanabe in Wakayama Prefecture

- Location in Japan
- Coordinates: 33°44′N 135°23′E
- Country: Japan
- Region: Kansai
- Prefecture: Wakayama
- City status granted: May 20, 1942

Government
  - Mayor: Mitsutoshi Manago

Area
  - Total: 1,026.91 km^{2} (396.49 sq mi)

Population (November 1, 2021)
  - Total: 70,972
  - Density: 69.112/km^{2} (179.00/sq mi)
- Time zone: UTC+09:00 (JST)
- City hall address: 1 Shin'yashikimachi, Tanabe-shi, Wakayama-ken; 646-8545
- Climate: Cfa
- Website: Official website
- Symbols
- Bird: Japanese white-eye
- Flower: Ume
- Tree: Ubamegashi (Quercus phillyraeoides)

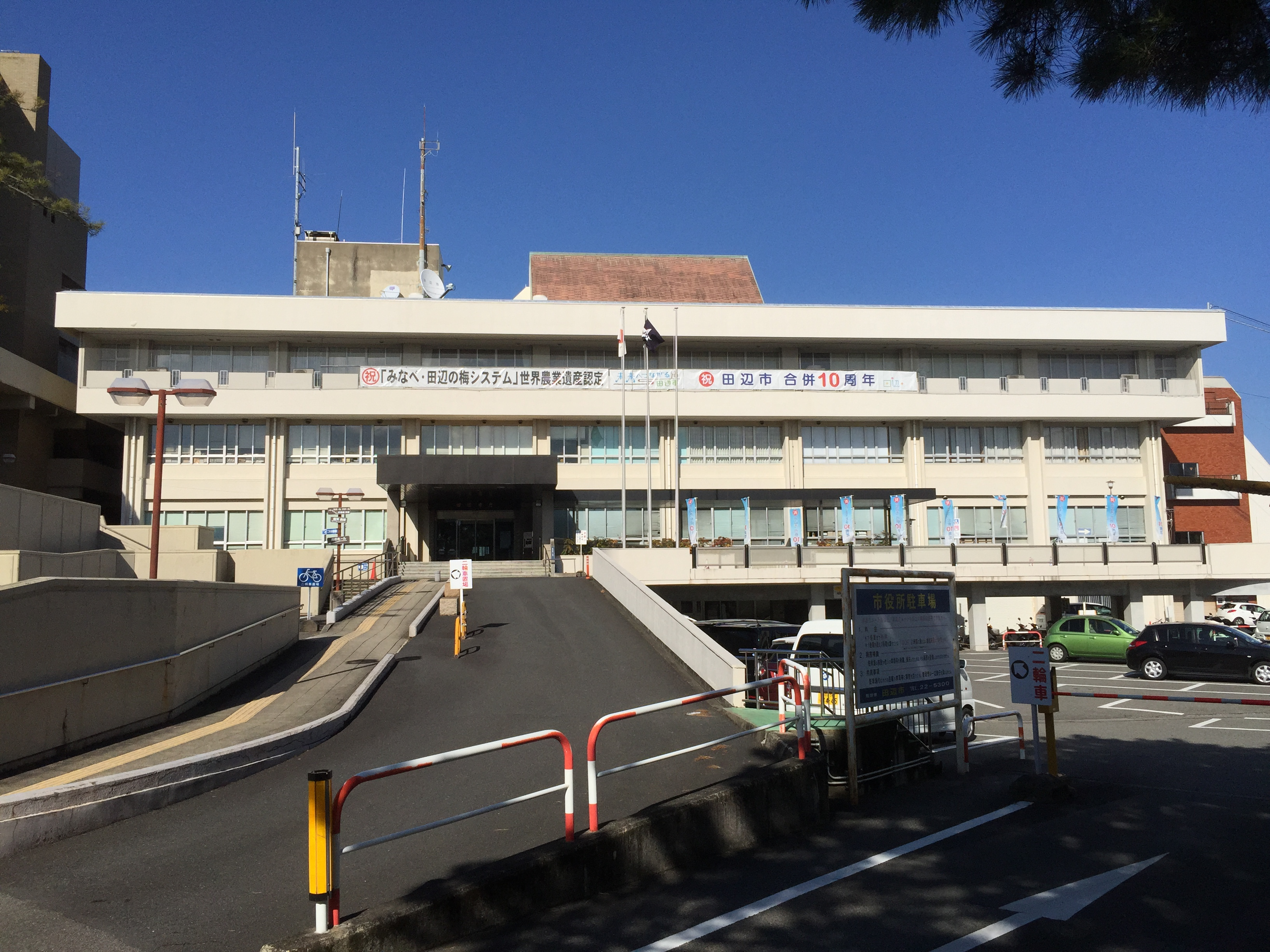
Tanabe city hall

Tanabe (Japanese: 田辺市, Tanabe-shi, pronounced [tanabe ɕi]) is a city located in Wakayama Prefecture, Japan. As of 1 November 2021, the city has an estimated population of 70,972 in 35,076 households and a population density of 69 persons per km^{2}. The total area of the city is 1,026.91 square kilometres (396.49 sq mi). Tanabe is the second most populous city in Wakayama and the largest in the Kansai region of Japan in terms of area.

== Geography ==
Tanabe is located the south-central Kii Peninsula and faces the Pacific Ocean to the west and the Kii Mountains to the north and east. The coastline is intricate and forms Tanabe Bay. Tenjinzaki is at the northern end of the bay, and Shirahama is on the south side. The climate is moderated by the effects of the Kuroshio Current offshore.

=== Climate ===
Tanabe has a humid subtropical climate (Köppen Cfa) characterized by warm summers and cool winters with little to no snowfall. The average annual temperature in Tanabe is 16.6 °C (61.9 °F). The average annual rainfall is 2,348 mm (92.4 in) with September as the wettest month. The temperatures are highest on average in August, at around 26.5 °C (79.7 °F), and lowest in January, at around 6.9 °C (44.4 °F). The area is subject to typhoons in summer.

Climate data for Kurisugawa, Tanabe (1991−2020 normals, extremes 1979−present)
Month	Jan	Feb	Mar	Apr	May	Jun	Jul	Aug	Sep	Oct	Nov	Dec	Year
Record high °C (°F)	19.9 (67.8)	24.7 (76.5)	27.0 (80.6)	28.9 (84.0)	31.7 (89.1)	33.8 (92.8)	39.2 (102.6)	40.6 (105.1)	36.1 (97.0)	32.2 (90.0)	27.3 (81.1)	22.7 (72.9)	40.6 (105.1)
Mean daily maximum °C (°F)	10.5 (50.9)	11.6 (52.9)	15.2 (59.4)	20.1 (68.2)	24.3 (75.7)	26.5 (79.7)	30.1 (86.2)	31.5 (88.7)	28.6 (83.5)	23.7 (74.7)	18.5 (65.3)	13.0 (55.4)	21.1 (70.1)
Daily mean °C (°F)	4.0 (39.2)	4.8 (40.6)	8.3 (46.9)	13.2 (55.8)	17.6 (63.7)	21.2 (70.2)	25.0 (77.0)	25.7 (78.3)	22.6 (72.7)	17.0 (62.6)	11.3 (52.3)	6.0 (42.8)	14.7 (58.5)
Mean daily minimum °C (°F)	−1.2 (29.8)	−1.0 (30.2)	2.1 (35.8)	6.7 (44.1)	11.7 (53.1)	17.0 (62.6)	21.3 (70.3)	21.6 (70.9)	18.3 (64.9)	12.0 (53.6)	5.8 (42.4)	0.7 (33.3)	9.6 (49.2)
Record low °C (°F)	−7.0 (19.4)	−7.5 (18.5)	−5.5 (22.1)	−2.9 (26.8)	−0.1 (31.8)	6.1 (43.0)	12.9 (55.2)	13.4 (56.1)	6.8 (44.2)	0.8 (33.4)	−2.7 (27.1)	−6.0 (21.2)	−7.5 (18.5)
Average precipitation mm (inches)	91.9 (3.62)	113.7 (4.48)	182.0 (7.17)	199.2 (7.84)	250.8 (9.87)	387.5 (15.26)	395.0 (15.55)	262.7 (10.34)	301.3 (11.86)	215.0 (8.46)	134.0 (5.28)	86.9 (3.42)	2,581.3 (101.63)
Average precipitation days (≥ 1.0 mm)	7.6	7.9	11.0	10.6	10.7	14.5	13.2	12.1	11.9	10.2	7.9	7.3	124.9
Mean monthly sunshine hours	158.3	157.2	183.6	196.0	188.9	129.4	156.2	193.7	153.0	160.0	160.2	156.4	1,994.5
Source: Japan Meteorological Agency

Climate data for Ryūjin, Tanabe (1994−2020 normals, extremes 1994−present)
Month	Jan	Feb	Mar	Apr	May	Jun	Jul	Aug	Sep	Oct	Nov	Dec	Year
Record high °C (°F)	18.1 (64.6)	22.3 (72.1)	24.3 (75.7)	29.0 (84.2)	31.4 (88.5)	34.2 (93.6)	37.8 (100.0)	37.2 (99.0)	34.1 (93.4)	29.7 (85.5)	24.7 (76.5)	21.7 (71.1)	37.8 (100.0)
Mean daily maximum °C (°F)	7.5 (45.5)	9.1 (48.4)	13.1 (55.6)	18.3 (64.9)	23.0 (73.4)	25.3 (77.5)	29.0 (84.2)	30.4 (86.7)	26.9 (80.4)	21.8 (71.2)	16.1 (61.0)	10.0 (50.0)	19.2 (66.6)
Daily mean °C (°F)	2.4 (36.3)	3.5 (38.3)	6.9 (44.4)	11.8 (53.2)	16.6 (61.9)	20.2 (68.4)	23.9 (75.0)	24.6 (76.3)	21.4 (70.5)	15.8 (60.4)	9.9 (49.8)	4.5 (40.1)	13.5 (56.2)
Mean daily minimum °C (°F)	−1.6 (29.1)	−1.0 (30.2)	1.5 (34.7)	6.1 (43.0)	11.1 (52.0)	16.0 (60.8)	20.2 (68.4)	20.7 (69.3)	17.4 (63.3)	11.4 (52.5)	5.2 (41.4)	0.3 (32.5)	8.9 (48.1)
Record low °C (°F)	−8.7 (16.3)	−8.6 (16.5)	−5.1 (22.8)	−2.4 (27.7)	1.4 (34.5)	7.6 (45.7)	14.2 (57.6)	13.7 (56.7)	8.5 (47.3)	2.3 (36.1)	−1.9 (28.6)	−5.5 (22.1)	−8.7 (16.3)
Average precipitation mm (inches)	99.9 (3.93)	135.1 (5.32)	208.2 (8.20)	235.3 (9.26)	270.2 (10.64)	431.6 (16.99)	510.3 (20.09)	344.3 (13.56)	357.6 (14.08)	227.4 (8.95)	135.7 (5.34)	95.8 (3.77)	3,088.3 (121.59)
Average precipitation days (≥ 1.0 mm)	9.9	9.7	12.2	11.3	11.4	14.6	14.4	12.9	12.0	10.7	8.5	9.1	136.7
Mean monthly sunshine hours	132.7	137.7	165.9	190.7	198.8	133.1	154.5	187.1	142.1	154.6	146.6	133.0	1,863.4
Source: Japan Meteorological Agency

== Demographics ==
The population of Tanabe has decreased steadily over the past 40 years.

Historical population
Year	Pop.	±%
1960	92,278	—
1970	85,347	−7.5%
1980	88,130	+3.3%
1990	86,143	−2.3%
2000	85,646	−0.6%
2010	79,107	−7.6%
2020	69,870	−11.7%

== History ==
The area of the modern city of Tanabe was within ancient Kii Province. During the late Heian period to early Kamakura period, it was noted as the birthplace of Minamoto no Yoshitsune's companion, Benkei. During the Edo period, it was part of the holdings of Kishū Domain ruled by a cadet branch of the Tokugawa clan through a hereditary karō based at Tanabe Castle. The town of Tanabe was established with the creation of the modern municipalities system on April 1, 1889. It merged with the neighboring town of Haya and attained city status on May 20, 1942. Tanabe continued to expand through annexation of neighboring municipalities: the villages of Inari, Shimaakizu, Maro in 1950, Shinjo in 1954, Nishi-Tonda in 1955, and the town of Muro in 1958.

On May 1, 2005, the village of Ryūjin, (from Hidaka District), the town of Nakahechi, the village of Ōtō (both from Nishimuro District), and the town of Hongū (from Higashimuro District) were merged into Tanabe.

== Government ==
Tanabe has a mayor-council form of government with a directly elected mayor and a unicameral city council of 20 members. Tanabe contributes three members to the Wakayama Prefectural Assembly. In terms of national politics, the city is part of Wakayama 3rd district of the lower house of the Diet of Japan.

== Economy ==
Tanabe is the main commercial center of central Wakayama Prefecture. Agriculture plays a major role in the economy, with production of umeboshi pickled plums, and the cultivation of various varieties of oranges and other citrus fruits. Shiitake mushrooms, and the raising of poultry are also contributors. Commercial fishing and forestry play secondary roles.

== Education ==
Tanabe has 25 public elementary schools and 15 public middle schools operated by the city government and five public high schools operated by the Wakayama Prefectural Department of Education. The prefecture also operates one special education school for the handicapped, and one vocational education school.

== Transportation ==
=== Railway ===
JR West – Kisei Main Line

- Kii-Shinjō - Kii-Tanabe - Haya

=== Highway ===
- Hanwa Expressway
- Kisei Expressway
- National Route 42
- National Route 168
- National Route 311
- National Route 371
- National Route 424
- National Route 425

== Local attractions ==
- Cape Tenjinzaki, a preserved beach made of layered slabs of rock formation. The beach is submerged with water during high tides and revealed during low tides. It is also known as the birthplace of the Japan National Trust movement. Tenjinzaki Cape serves as a place of recreation and relaxation for citizens. People also enjoy fishing and shellfish gathering.
- Isoma Rock Shelter Site
- Kōzanji Shell Mound
- Kumano Hongū Taisha (熊野本宮大社), one of the Kumano Sanzan shrines
- Kumano Kodō and Ōmine Okugakemichi ancient pilgrimage roads, a National Historic Sites and World Heritage site
- Misu-ji temple ruins, National Historic Site
- Tensōkai (天爽会) headquarters

=== Festivals ===
- Benkei Matsuri, a Yosakoi dance festival, featuring fireworks and dance performances by employees of local businesses as well as traveling dance groups, held in October.
- Tanabe Matsuri, a festival held at Tanabe's Tokei jinja shrine (闘鶏神社) in July.
- Ya-Ya Matsuri (August 8 Festival), a festival held to promote local shopping districts in downtown Tanabe City in August.

== Sister cities ==
- Tanabe was a sister city to Wyong Shire in New South Wales, Australia until 2010.

== Notable people from Tanabe ==
- Tetsu Katayama (1887–1978), former Prime Minister of Japan
- Sendagawa Kichizō (1793–1828), sumo wrestler
- Minakata Kumagusu (1867–1941), author and naturalist
- Morihei Ueshiba (1883–1969), the founder of Aikido
