= Shingū, Wakayama =

Shingū 新宮市
- City
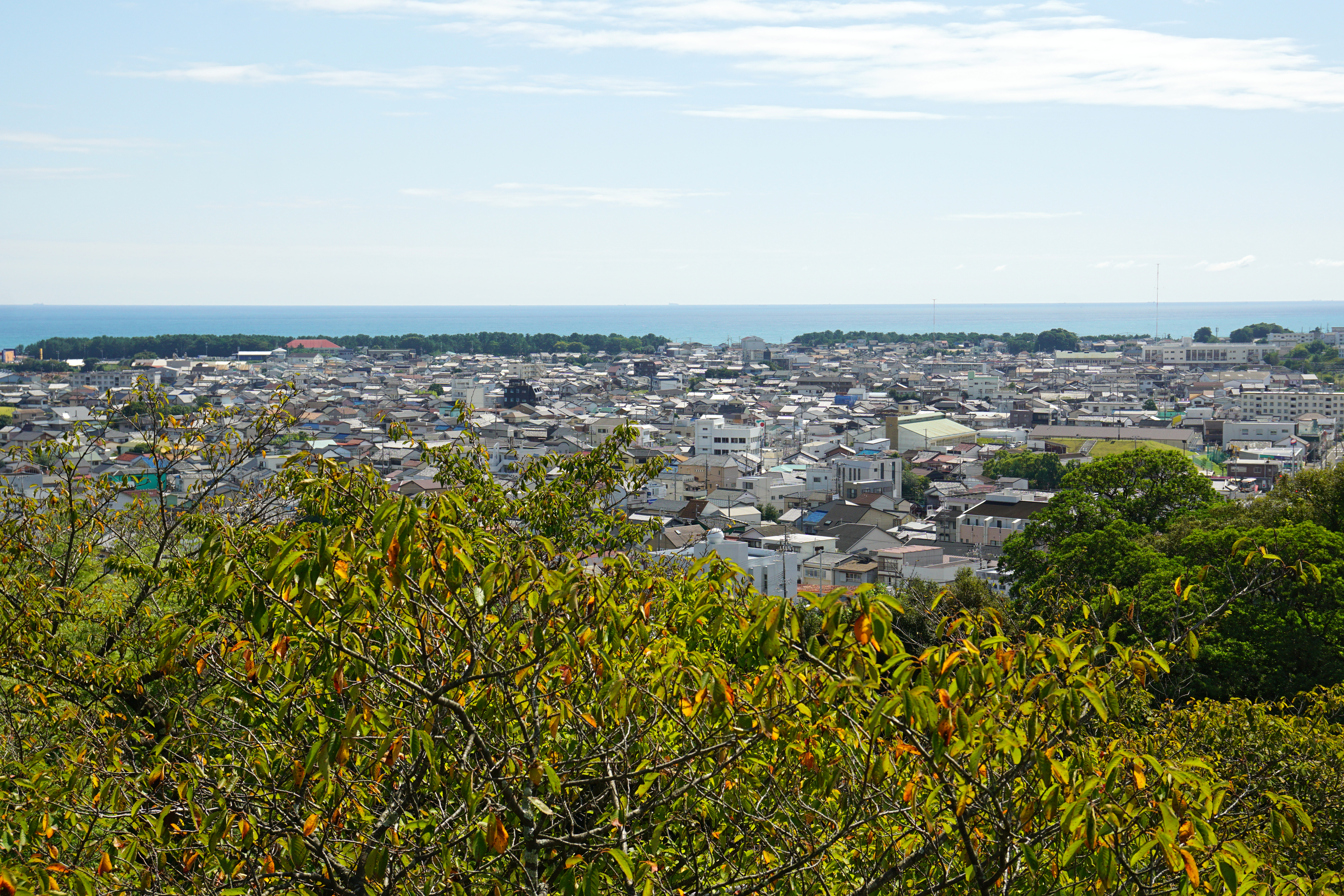
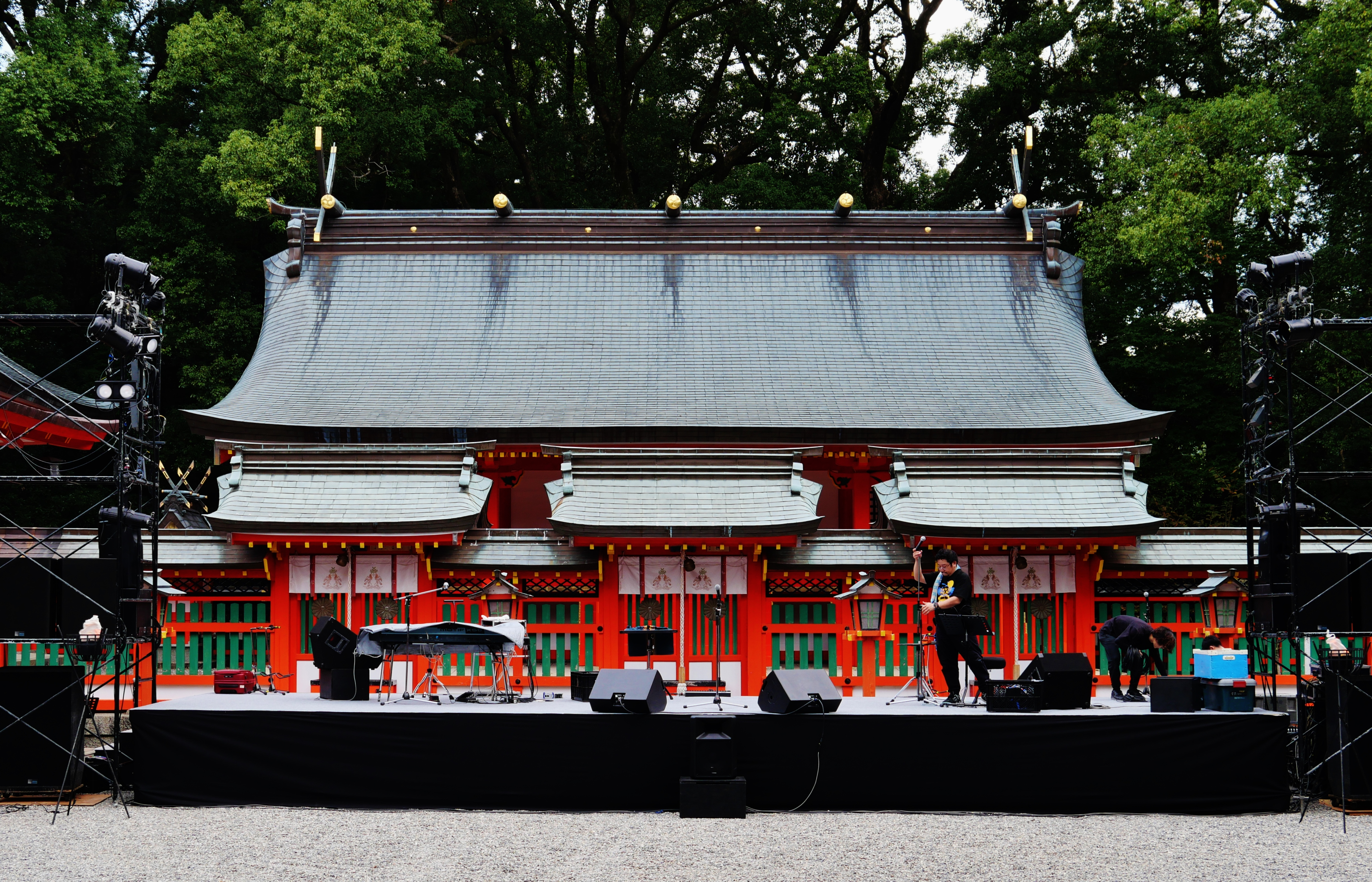
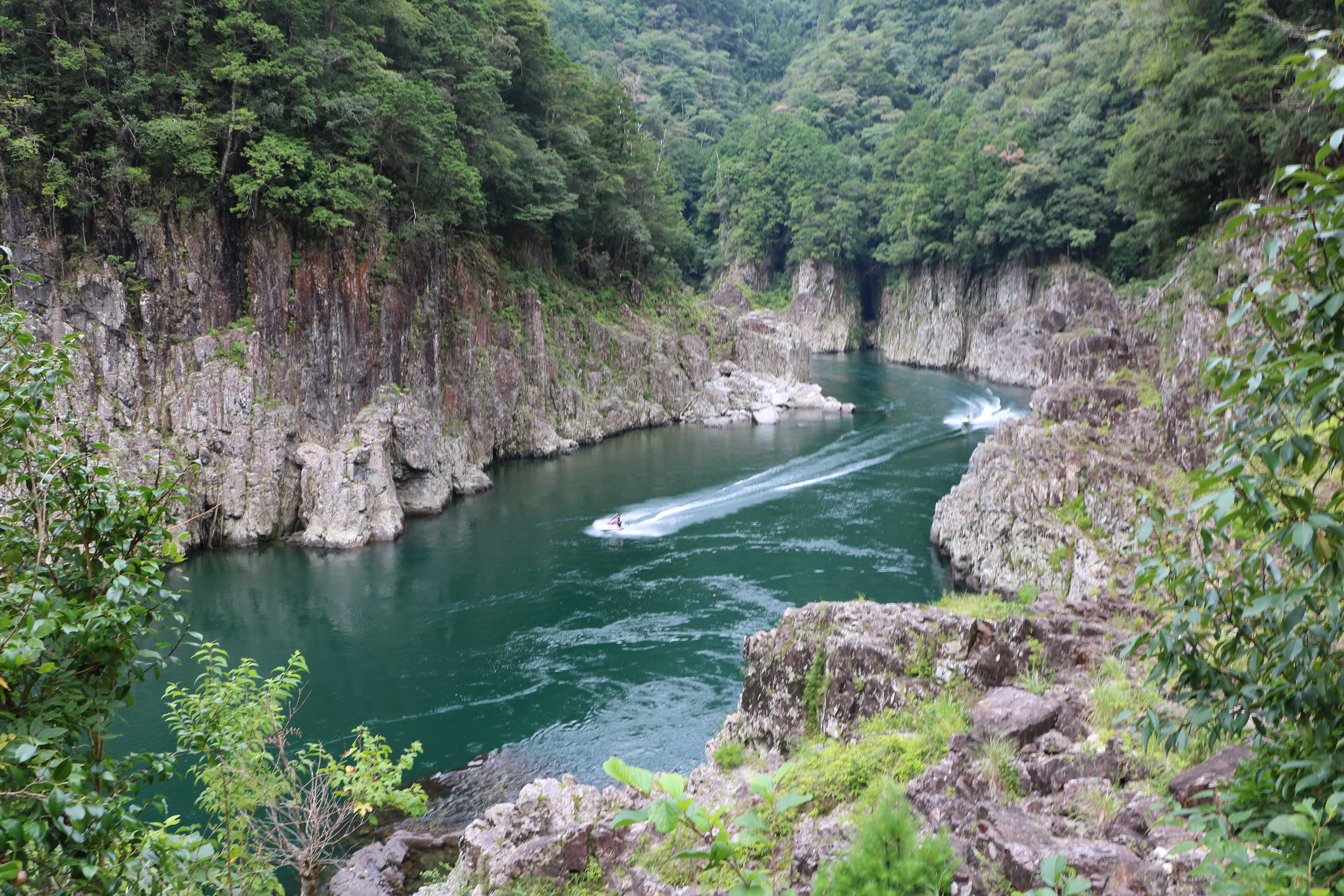
- Panorama vie of Shingu, from Shingu Castle Ruin Kumano Hayatama Taisha Dorokyo

- Flag Seal

- Location of Shingū in Wakayama Prefecture

- Location in Japan
- Coordinates: 33°43′N 136°0′E
- Country: Japan
- Region: Kansai
- Prefecture: Wakayama
- First official recorded: 33 BC
- City settled: October 1, 1933

Government
  - Mayor: Katsuyuki Ueda（上田勝之）- from November 2025

Area
  - Total: 255.23 km^{2} (98.54 sq mi)

Population (November 1, 2021)
  - Total: 27,491
  - Density: 107.71/km^{2} (278.97/sq mi)
- Time zone: UTC+09:00 (JST)
- City hall address: 1-1 Kasuga, Shingū-shi, Wakayama-ken 647-8555
- Climate: Cfa
- Website: Official website
- Symbols
- Flower: Crinum asiaticum and Kawasatsuki
- Tree: Nageia nagi, Kumano sugi, Tendaiuyaku (Lindera strychnifolia)

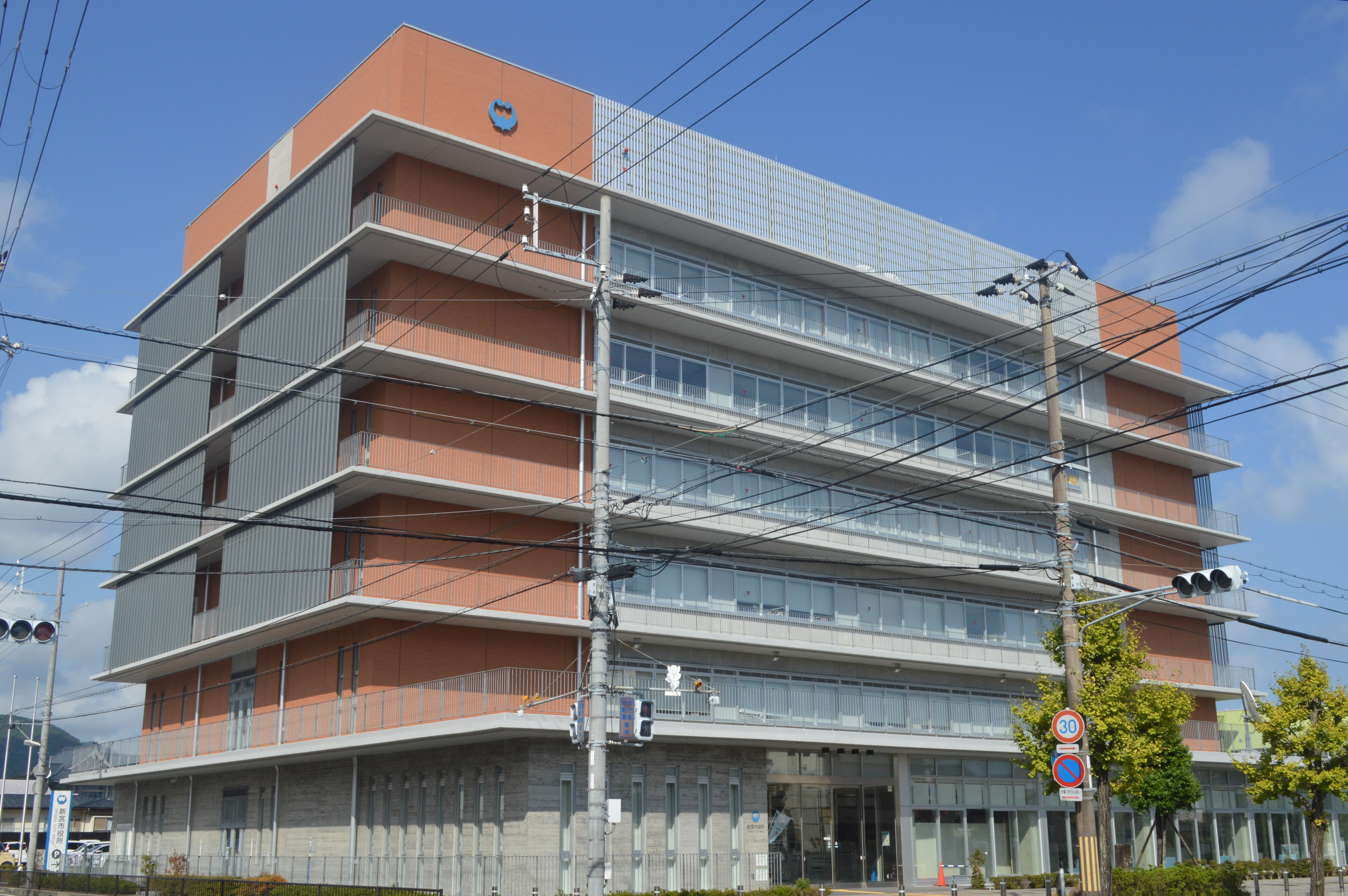
Shingū city hall

Shingū city aerial photograph

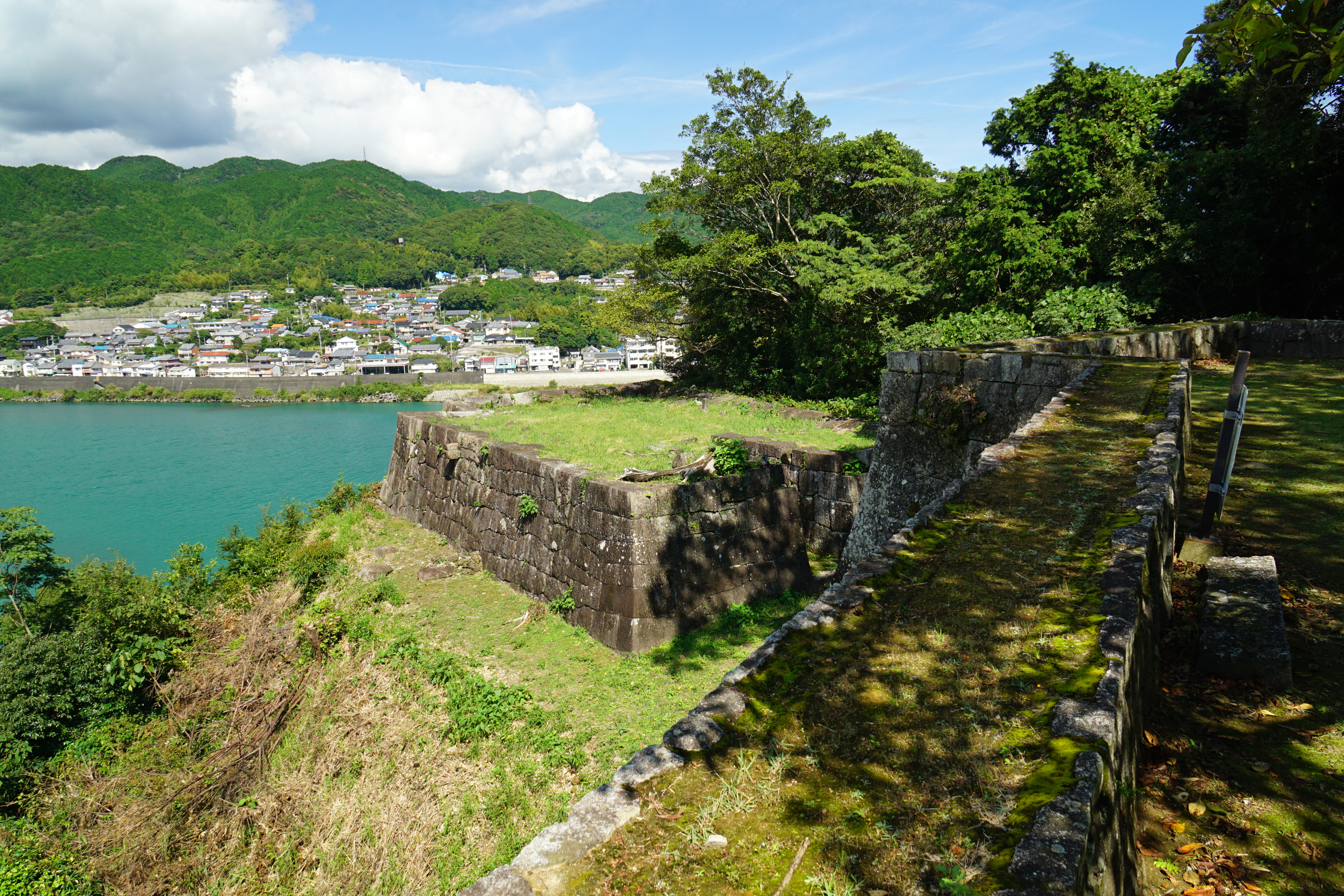
Shingū Castle ruins

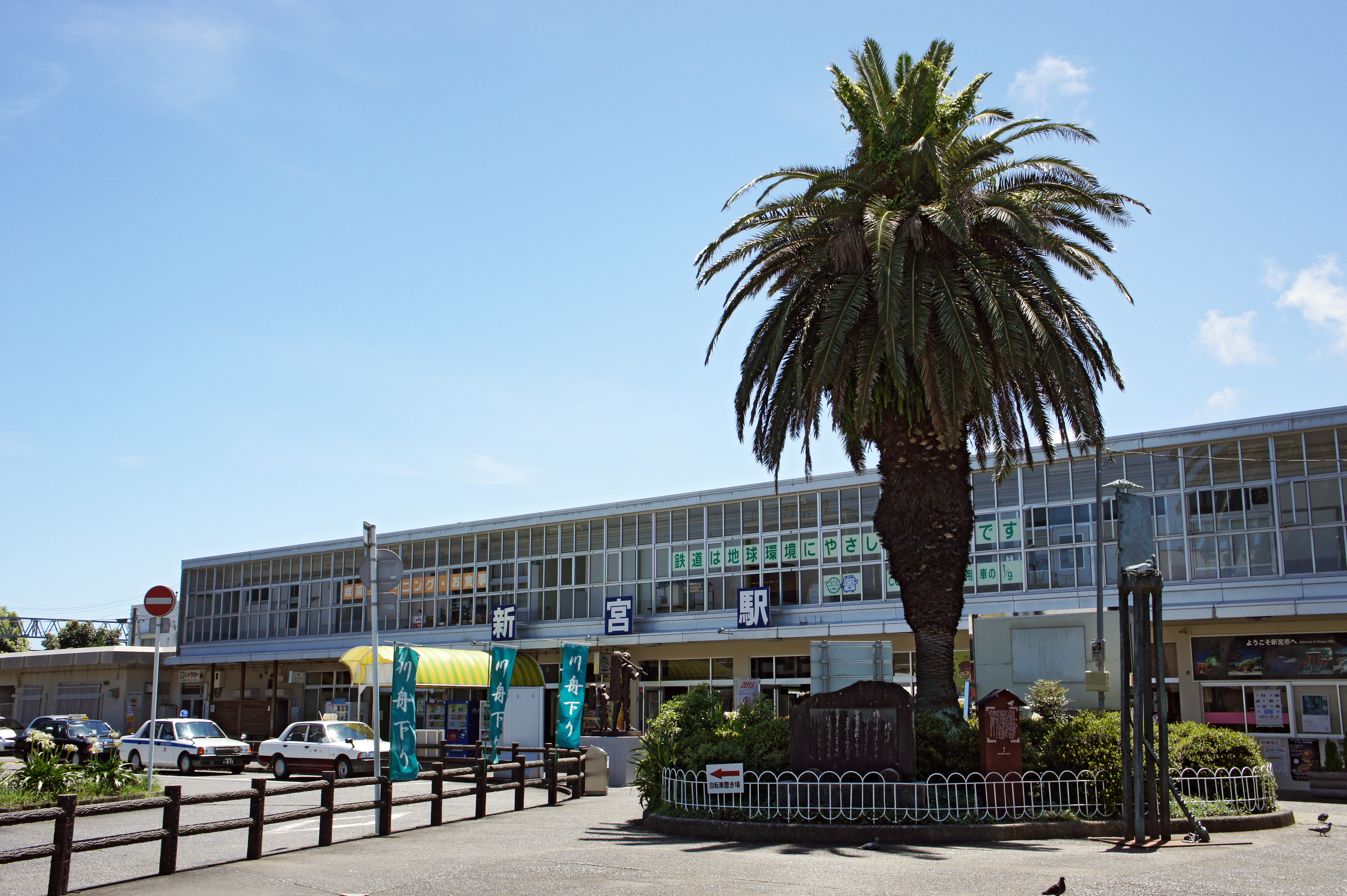
Shingū Station

Shingū (新宮市, Shingū-shi; Japanese pronunciation: [ɕiŋ.ɡɯꜜː(.ɕi), -ŋɯꜜː-]) is a city located in Wakayama Prefecture, Japan. As of 1 November 2021, the city had an estimated population of 27,491 in 14649 households and a population density of 110 persons per km^{2}. The total area of the city is 255.23 square kilometres (98.54 sq mi). Shingū literally means 'New Shrine' and refers to Hayatama Shrine, one of the Three Grand Shrines of Kumano (See). The 'old shrine' would be Kamikura Shrine.

== Geography ==
Shingū is located near the southern tip of Wakayama Prefecture on the Kii Peninsula, on the west side of the mouth of the Kumano River. It faces the Pacific Ocean to the east. Parts of the city are within the limits of the Yoshino-Kumano National Park.

=== Climate ===
Shingū has a Humid subtropical climate (Köppen Cfa) characterized by warm summers and cool winters with light to no snowfall. The average annual temperature in Shingū is 17.3 °C (63.1 °F). The average annual rainfall is 3,332.9 mm (131.22 in) with June as the wettest month. The temperatures are highest on average in August, at around 27.2 °C (81.0 °F), and lowest in January, at around 7.6 °C (45.7 °F). The area is subject to typhoons in summer. The highest temperature ever recorded in Shingū was 39.6 °C (103.3 °F) 8 July 2024. The coldest temperature ever recorded was −4.6 °C (23.7 °F) on 27 February 1981.

Climate data for Shingū (1991−2020 normals, extremes 1979−present)
Month	Jan	Feb	Mar	Apr	May	Jun	Jul	Aug	Sep	Oct	Nov	Dec	Year
Record high °C (°F)	21.7 (71.1)	24.8 (76.6)	29.3 (84.7)	31.5 (88.7)	34.2 (93.6)	36.3 (97.3)	39.6 (103.3)	39.3 (102.7)	37.4 (99.3)	32.8 (91.0)	27.1 (80.8)	24.5 (76.1)	39.6 (103.3)
Mean daily maximum °C (°F)	11.9 (53.4)	12.8 (55.0)	15.7 (60.3)	19.9 (67.8)	23.3 (73.9)	25.8 (78.4)	30.0 (86.0)	30.9 (87.6)	28.0 (82.4)	23.7 (74.7)	19.1 (66.4)	14.3 (57.7)	21.3 (70.3)
Daily mean °C (°F)	7.6 (45.7)	8.3 (46.9)	11.3 (52.3)	15.7 (60.3)	19.4 (66.9)	22.4 (72.3)	26.3 (79.3)	27.2 (81.0)	24.6 (76.3)	20.0 (68.0)	15.0 (59.0)	9.9 (49.8)	17.3 (63.2)
Mean daily minimum °C (°F)	3.6 (38.5)	4.2 (39.6)	7.0 (44.6)	11.5 (52.7)	15.7 (60.3)	19.4 (66.9)	23.3 (73.9)	24.3 (75.7)	21.8 (71.2)	16.9 (62.4)	11.4 (52.5)	6.0 (42.8)	13.8 (56.8)
Record low °C (°F)	−3.4 (25.9)	−4.6 (23.7)	−1.7 (28.9)	2.3 (36.1)	8.7 (47.7)	13.8 (56.8)	17.3 (63.1)	18.0 (64.4)	13.5 (56.3)	7.2 (45.0)	2.5 (36.5)	−0.9 (30.4)	−4.6 (23.7)
Average precipitation mm (inches)	110.1 (4.33)	151.8 (5.98)	259.8 (10.23)	299.1 (11.78)	311.7 (12.27)	444.6 (17.50)	342.2 (13.47)	276.4 (10.88)	443.0 (17.44)	401.0 (15.79)	184.0 (7.24)	109.6 (4.31)	3,332.9 (131.22)
Average precipitation days (≥ 1.0 mm)	6.4	7.4	10.8	10.7	11.2	15.0	12.6	11.9	13.8	11.9	8.1	6.1	125.9
Mean monthly sunshine hours	200.1	182.6	196.4	196.2	183.7	127.4	174.4	209.1	145.8	149.4	165.1	194.2	2,124.3
Source: Japan Meteorological Agency

== Demographics ==
The population of Shingū has decreased steadily over the past 60 years.

Historical population
Year	Pop.	±%
1960	45,666	—
1970	42,073	−7.9%
1980	42,428	+0.8%
1990	38,140	−10.1%
2000	35,176	−7.8%
2010	31,493	−10.5%

== History ==
The area of the modern city of Shingū was within ancient Kii Province, and per the Nihon Shoki was the home of the Kumano Kuni no miyatsuko, a local king ruling the Kumano region which straddles what is now southern Wakayama and Mie prefectures. The settlement had prospered since before the Kamakura period as a timber distribution center using the Kumano River, and as an entrance to the Kumano Sanzan shrines. During the Edo period, it was part of the holdings of the Kii Tokugawa clan, and was the castle town of the Shingū Domain during the Edo period. After the Meiji restoration, the area became part of the Higashimuro District, Wakayama, and the town of Shingū was established with the creation of the modern municipalities system on April 1, 1889. Shingū and the neighboring town of Miwasaki merged to form the city of Shingū on October 1, 1933. Shingū annexed the village of Takeda on September 30, 1956. On October 1, 2005, the town of Kumanogawa (from Higashimuro District), an exclave between Nara and Mie prefectures, was merged with Shingū.

== Government ==
Shingū has a mayor-council form of government with a directly elected mayor and a unicameral city council of 15 members. Shingū contributes one member to the Wakayama Prefectural Assembly. In terms of national politics, the city is part of Wakayama 3rd district of the lower house of the Diet of Japan.

== Economy ==
Shingū is the central commercial city of the Kumano Region and is one of the largest cities in Wakayama Prefecture. Primary industries include forestry, commercial fishing, growing of leafy vegetables such as komatsuna and horticulture, and "Kumano brand" beef. Secondary industries are centered around timber and paper processing.

== Education ==
Shingū has five public elementary schools and five public middle schools operated by the city government and two public high schools operated by the Wakayama Prefectural Department of Education. The city also has one private middle school and one private high school. The prefecture also operates one special education school for the handicapped, and one vocational education school.

== Transportation ==
=== Railway ===
JR Tōkai – Kisei Main Line

- Shingū

JR West – Kisei Main Line

- Shingū - Miwasaki - Kii-Sano

=== Highway ===
- Nachikatsuura-Shingū Road
- Shingū-Kihō Expressway
- National Route 42
- National Route 168
- National Route 169
- National Route 311

== Local attractions ==
- Shingū Castle ruins, National Historic Site
- Kumano Hayatama Taisha, one of the Kumano Sanzan shrines
- Ōmine Okugakemichi and the Kumano Kodō, parts of the Sacred Sites and Pilgrimage Routes in the Kii Mountain Range, a UNESCO World Heritage Site
- Kumano River
- Kamikura Shrine, with the object of worship a great sacred rock called "Gotobiki-iwa".

== Sister cities ==
- Santa Cruz, California, United States

== Notable people from Shingū ==
- Yasuyuki Kishino, football player and manager
- Kenji Nakagami, novelist
- Haruo Satō, former novelist and poet
