= Nishimuro District =

District in Wakayama prefecture, Japan

Coordinates: 33.604°N 135.486°E

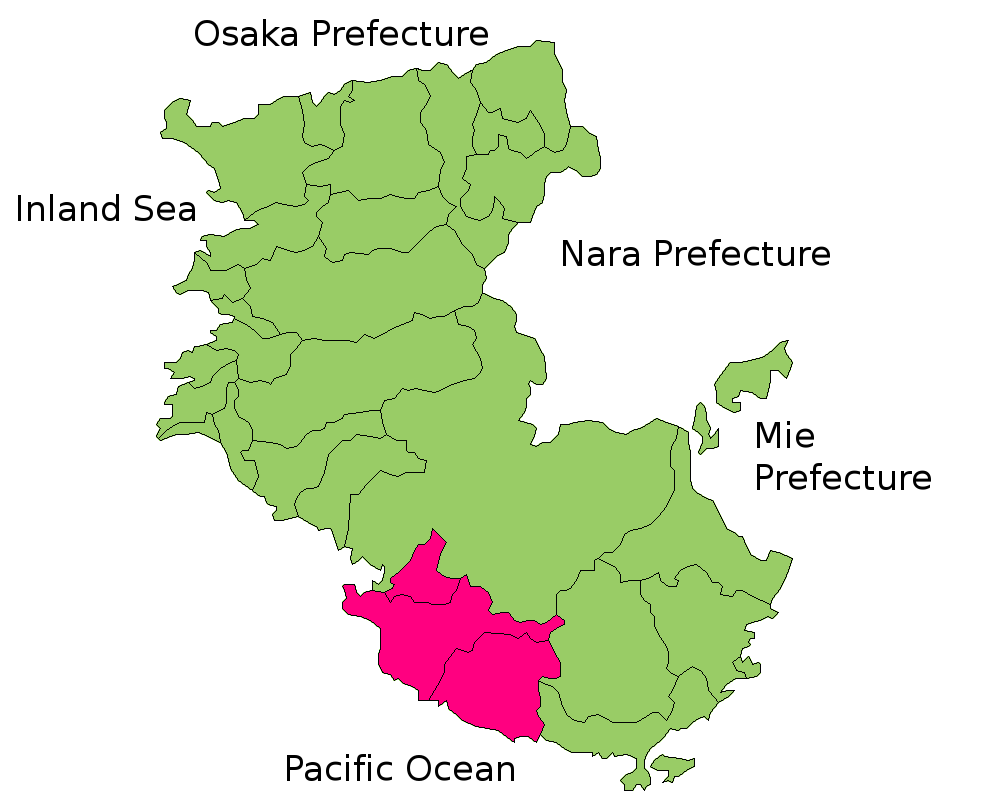
Location of Nishimuro District in Wakayama Prefecture

Nishimuro District (西牟婁郡, Nishimuro-gun) is a district located in Wakayama Prefecture, Japan.

As of October 1, 2020, the district has an estimated Population of 39,183 and a Density of 90.53 persons/km^{2}. The total area is 432.8 km^{2}.

== Towns and villages ==
- Kamitonda
- Shirahama
- Susami

== Merger ==
- On April 1, 2005, the town of Kushimoto merged with the town of Koza, from Higashimuro District, to form the new town of Kushimoto, now part of Higashimuro District.
- On May 1, 2005, the town of Nakahechi, and the village of Ōtō merged into the city of Tanabe.
- On March 1, 2006, the town of Hikigawa merged into the town of Shirahama.
