= Higashimuro District =

District in Wakayama prefecture, Japan

Coordinates: 33.600°N 135.791°E

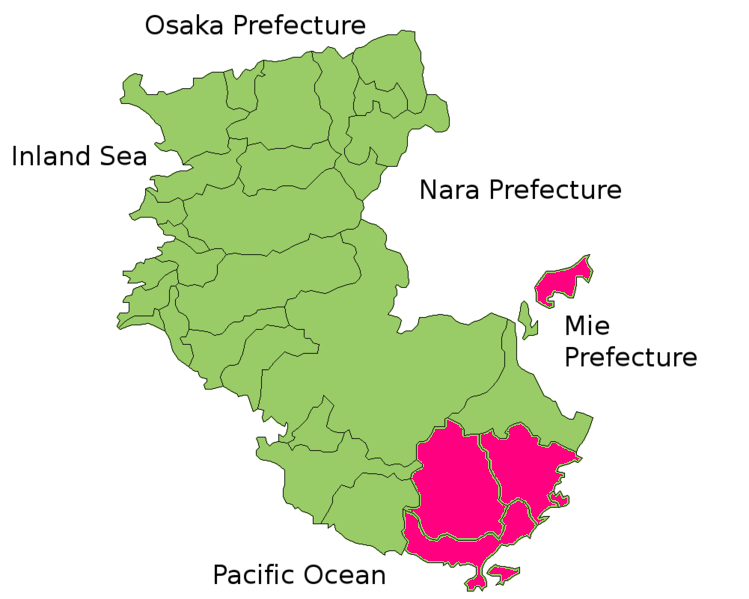
Location of Higashimuro District in Wakayama Prefecture

Higashimuro (東牟婁郡, Higashimuro-gun) is a district located in Wakayama Prefecture, Japan.

As of September 1, 2008, the district has an estimated population of 43,306 and a density of 64.8 persons/km^{2}. The total area is 667.92 km^{2}.

== Towns and villages ==
- Kitayama
- Kozagawa
- Kushimoto
- Nachikatsuura
- Taiji

== Mergers ==
- On April 1, 2005 - the town of Kushimoto from Nishimuro District merged with the town of Koza, formerly from Higashimuro District, to form the new town of Kushimoto (now part of Higashimuro District).
- On May 1, 2005 - the town of Hongū merged into the city of Tanabe.
- On October 1, 2005 - the town of Kumanogawa merged into the city of Shingū.
