= Wakayama 2nd district =

Japan House of Representatives constituency

- Parliamentary constituency for the Japanese House of Representatives
- Numbered map of Wakayama Prefecture single-member districts
- Prefecture: Wakayama
- Proportional District: Kinki
- Electorate: 386,215

Current constituency
- Created: 1994
- Seats: One
- Party: Independent
- Representatives: Hiroshige Sekō
- Municipalities: Cities of Arida, Gobō, Hashimoto, Kainan, Shingū, and Tanabe Districts of Arida, Hidaka, Higashimuro, Ito, Kaisō, and Nishimuro

Wakayama 2nd district (和歌山県第2区, Wakayama-ken dai-niku or simply 和歌山2区, Wakayama-niku ) is a single-member constituency of the House of Representatives in the national Diet of Japan located in Wakayama Prefecture.

== Areas covered ==
=== Since 2022 ===
- Arida
- Gobō
- Hashimoto
- Kainan
- Shingū
- Tanabe
- Arida District
- Hidaka District
- Higashimuro District
- Ito District
- Kaisō District
- Nishimuro District

=== 2013 - 2022 ===
- Arida
- Hashimoto
- Kainan
- Kinokawa
- Iwade
- Ito District
- Kaisō District

=== 1994 - 2013 ===
- Hashimoto
- Kainan
- Ito District
- Kaisō District
- Naga District

== List of representatives ==
Election	Representative	Party	Notes
1996	Mitsuzo Kishimoto	LDP	died on January 23, 2002.
2000	Mitsuzo Kishimoto	LDP	died on January 23, 2002.
2002 by-el	Masatoshi Ishida	LDP	
2003	Masatoshi Ishida	LDP	
2005	Masatoshi Ishida	LDP	
2009	Naoto Sakaguchi	Democratic	
2009	Naoto Sakaguchi	Restoration	
2012	Masatoshi Ishida	LDP	
2014	Masatoshi Ishida	LDP	
2017	Masatoshi Ishida	LDP	
2021	Masatoshi Ishida	LDP	
2024	Hiroshige Sekō	Independent	
2026	Hiroshige Sekō	Independent	

== Election results ==
=== 2026 ===
2026 Japanese Election
Party	Candidate	Votes	%	±%
Independent	Hiroshige Sekō	162,257	82.2	▲38.2
JCP	Yoshihiro Hatano	35,209	17.8	▲9.5
Turnout			57.62	▼5.09
Registered electors		370,660		
Independent hold				

=== 2024 ===
2024
Party	Candidate	Votes	%	±%
Independent	Hiroshige Sekō	101,739	44.02	New
LDP	Nobuyasu Nikai	71,114	30.77	▼26.97
CDP	Yuko Shinko	33,147	14.34	▼11.60
JCP	Fumiro Kusumoto	19,062	8.25	N/A
Teiritsu Party	Hideaki Takahashi	6,033	2.61	New
Majority		30,625	13.25	
Registered electors		378,558		
Turnout			62.71	▲4.77
Independent gain from LDP				

=== 2021 ===
2021
Party	Candidate	Votes	%	±%
LDP	Masatoshi Ishida (Incumbent)	79,365	57.74	▼0.61
CDP	Mikio Fujii	35,654	25.94	New
Ishin	Junko Tokoro	19,735	14.36	▲1.90
Anti-NHK	Manami Tōnishi	2,700	1.96	New
Majority		43,711	31.80	
Registered electors		242,858		
Turnout			57.94	▲5.05
LDP hold				

=== 2017 ===
2017
Party	Candidate	Votes	%	±%
LDP	Masatoshi Ishida (Incumbent)	75,772	58.35	▲2.04
Kibō no Tō	Takanori Sakata	21,395	16.48	New
JCP	Masahiro Shimomura	16,520	12.72	▲0.52
Ishin	Takanori Sakae	16,175	12.46	New
Majority		54,377	41.87	
Registered electors		252,354		
Turnout			52.89	▲1.49
LDP hold				

=== 2014 ===
2014
Party	Candidate	Votes	%	±%
LDP	Masatoshi Ishida (Incumbent)	71,167	56.31	▲3.66
Innovation	Naoto Sakaguchi	39,799	31.49	New
JCP	Kiyohiko Tomioka	15,415	12.20	▲3.58
Majority		31,368	24.82	
Registered electors		252,386		
Turnout			51.40	▼10.59
LDP hold				

=== 2012 ===
2012
Party	Candidate	Votes	%	±%
LDP	Masatoshi Ishida	72,957	52.65	▲9.30
Restoration	Naoto Sakaguchi (Incumbent) (Won PR seat)	36,110	26.06	New
Democratic	Chikahiro Sakaguchi	17,567	12.68	▼42.09
JCP	Masaya Yoshida	11,942	8.62	N/A
Majority		36,847	26.59	
Registered electors		229,965		
Turnout			61.99	▼10.13
LDP gain from Restoration				

=== 2009 ===
2009
Party	Candidate	Votes	%	±%
Democratic	Naoto Sakaguchi	90,134	54.77	▲16.76
LDP	Masatoshi Ishida (Incumbent) (Won PR seat)	71,343	43.35	▼10.72
Happiness Realization	Miyako Kubo	3,089	1.88	New
Majority		18,791	11.42	
Registered electors		233,384		
Turnout			72.12	▲0.87
Democratic gain from LDP				

=== 2005 ===
2005
Party	Candidate	Votes	%	±%
LDP	Masatoshi Ishida (Incumbent)	88,915	54.07	▲3.10
Democratic	Takeshi Kishimoto	62,499	38.01	▼3.73
JCP	Masahiro Shimomura	13,027	7.92	▲0.63
Majority		26,416	16.06	
Registered electors		236,185		
Turnout			71.25	▲5.29
LDP hold				

=== 2003 ===
2003
Party	Candidate	Votes	%	±%
LDP	Masatoshi Ishida (Incumbent)	77,102	50.97	▼7.51
Democratic	Takeshi Kishimoto (Won PR seat)	63,145	41.74	▲14.99
JCP	Shinji Kokura	11,020	7.29	▼6.18
Majority		13,957	9.23	
Registered electors		236,169		
Turnout			65.96	▲2.20
LDP hold				

=== 2002 by-election ===
2002 Wakayama 2nd district by-election
Party	Candidate	Votes	%	±%
LDP	Masatoshi Ishida	71,631	49.36	▼9.12
Independent	Takeshi Kishimoto	60,398	41.62	New
JCP	Noriko Okumura	13,094	9.02	▼4.45
Majority		11,233	7.74	
Registered electors		235,618		
Turnout			62.49	▼1.27
LDP hold				

=== 2000 ===
2000
Party	Candidate	Votes	%	±%
LDP	Mitsuzo Kishimoto (Incumbent)	83,419	58.48	▲6.01
Democratic	Fuminori Kimura	38,156	26.75	New
JCP	Koyuki Yoshida	19,209	13.47	▼0.32
Liberal League	Yuki Komatsu	1,870	1.30	New
Majority		45,263	31.73	
Registered electors		234,713		
Turnout			63.76	▼0.97
LDP hold				

=== 1996 ===
1996
Party	Candidate	Votes	%	±%
LDP	Mitsuzo Kishimoto	74,734	52.47	New
New Frontier	Yōsuke Tsuruho	48,048	33.74	New
JCP	Koyuki Yoshida	19,637	13.79	New
Majority		26,686	18.73	
Registered electors		228,895		
Turnout			64.73	
LDP win (new seat)				
