= Fujinami Station (Wakayama) =

Railway station in Aridagawa, Wakayama Prefecture, Japan

Fujinami Station 藤並駅
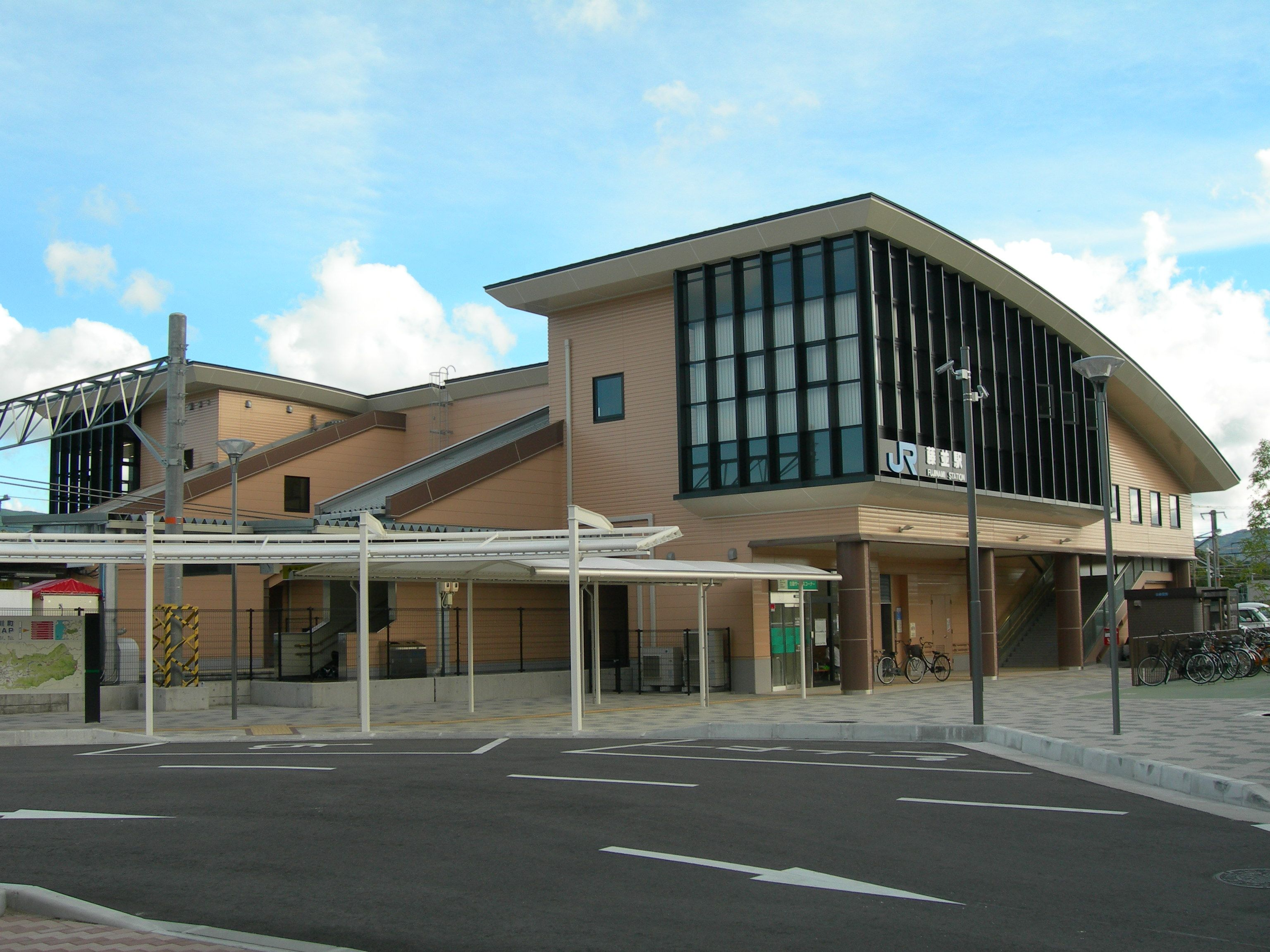
- Fujinami Station in September 2010

General information
- Location: 37-1 Myooji, Aridagawa-cho, Hidaka-gun, Wakayama-ken 643-0033; Japan
- Coordinates: 34.0579°N 135.1972°E
- System: JR-West commuter rail station
- Owner: West Japan Railway Company
- Operator: West Japan Railway Company
- Line: W Kisei Main Line (Kinokuni Line)
- Distance: 347.3 km (215.8 miles) from Kameyama; 167.1 km (103.8 miles) from Shingū
- Platforms: 2 side platforms
- Tracks: 2
- Train operators: West Japan Railway Company

Construction
- Structure type: At grade

Other information
- Status: Staffed
- Website: Official website

History
- Opened: 8 August 1926
- Electrified: 1978

Passengers
- FY2019: 1261 daily
Services
Preceding station	JR-West	Following station
W Kisei Main Line (Kinokuni Line)
Yuasa or Gobo	Limited Express Kuroshio	Minoshima or Kainan
Yuasa	Rapid	Minoshima
Yuasa	Local	Kii-Miyahara
Location
- Location within Wakayama Prefecture Location within Japan

Fujinami Station (藤並駅, Fujinami-eki) is a passenger railway station in located in the town of Aridagawa, Arida District, Wakayama Prefecture, Japan, operated by West Japan Railway Company (JR West).

== Lines ==
Fujinami Station is served by the Kisei Main Line (Kinokuni Line), and is located 347.3 kilometers from the terminus of the line at Kameyama Station and 167.1 kilometers from Shingū.

== Station layout ==
The station consists of two opposed side platforms connected by an elevated station building. The station is staffed.

=== Platforms ===
1	■ W Kisei Main Line (Kinokuni Line)	for Wakayama and Tennōji
2	■ W Kisei Main Line (Kinokuni Line)	for Gobō and Shingū

== Adjacent stations ==
«	Service	»
West Japan Railway Company (JR West)
Kisei Main Line
Yuasa or Gobo	Limited Express Kuroshio	Minoshima or Kainan
Yuasa	Rapid	Minoshima
Yuasa	Local	Kii-Miyahara

== History ==
Fujinami Station opened on August 8, 1926. With the privatization of the Japan National Railways (JNR) on April 1, 1987, the station came under the aegis of the West Japan Railway Company. A new station building was completed in March 2008.

== Passenger statistics ==
In fiscal 2019, the station was used by an average of 1261 passengers daily (boarding passengers only).

== Surrounding Area ==
- National Route 42
- Arita Driving School
- Otani Onsen

== See also ==
- List of railway stations in Japan
