= Hiroshige Sekō =

Japanese politician

- 世耕 弘成
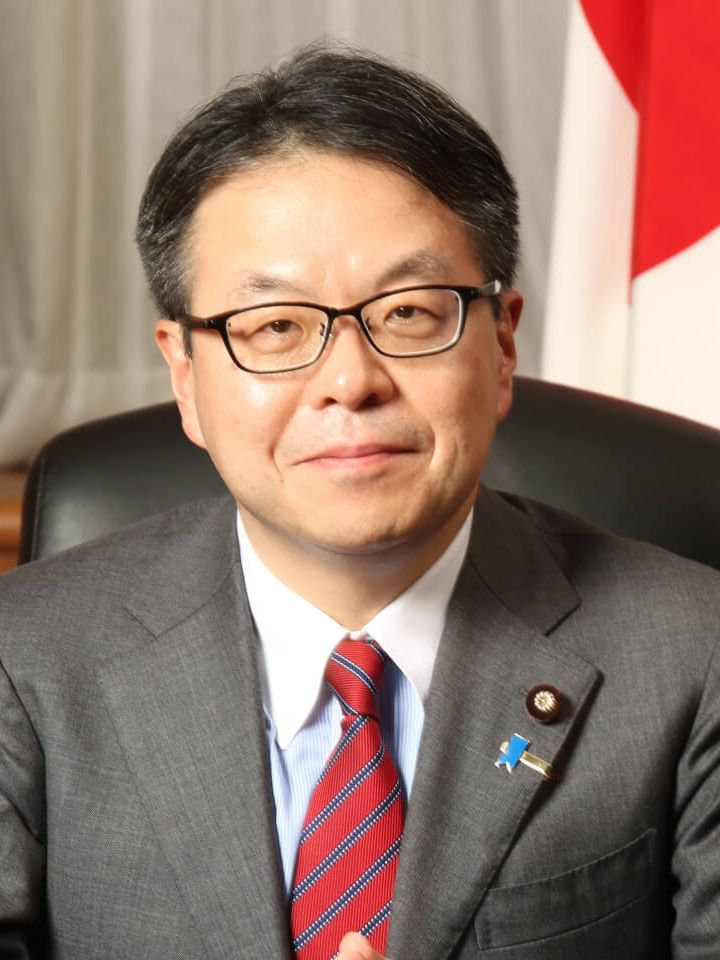
- Sekō in 2016

Minister of Economy, Trade and Industry
- In office 3 August 2016 – 11 September 2019
- Prime Minister: Shinzo Abe
- Preceded by: Motoo Hayashi
- Succeeded by: Isshu Sugawara

Deputy Chief Cabinet Secretary (Political affairs, House of Councillors)
- In office 26 December 2012 – 3 August 2016
- Prime Minister: Shinzo Abe
- Preceded by: Hirokazu Shiba
- Succeeded by: Kōtarō Nogami

Member of the House of Representatives
- Incumbent
- Assumed office 29 October 2024
- Preceded by: Masatoshi Ishida
- Constituency: Wakayama 2nd

Member of the House of Councillors
- In office 11 November 1998 – 15 October 2024
- Preceded by: Masataka Sekō
- Succeeded by: Yoshio Mochizuki
- Constituency: Wakayama at-large

Personal details
- Born: 9 November 1962 (age 64) Osaka, Japan
- Party: Independent (since 2024)
- Other political affiliations: LDP (1998–2024)
- Spouse: Kumiko Hayashi (m. 2013)
- Education: Waseda University; Boston University
- Occupation: Politician

Hiroshige Seko (世耕 弘成, Sekō Hiroshige; born 9 November 1962) is a Japanese politician serving as a Member of the House of Councillors since 1998. He previously served as Secretary-General of the Liberal Democratic Party in the House of Councillors, and was the Minister of Economy, Trade and Industry from August 2016 to September 2019 under Shinzo Abe. As Minister, he played a crucial role for announcing the export restrictions against South Korea in 2019. A native of Wakayama Prefecture, he graduated from Waseda University and received a master's degree in corporate communications from Boston University.

On 4 April 2024, Seko resigned from the LDP after he was reprimanded along with 38 other party members for their involvement in the 2023–2024 Japanese slush fund scandal. In the 2024 election, Seko ran as an independent candidate in the Wakayama 2nd district of the House of Representatives, and defeated the LDP candidate Nobuyasu Nikai, son of former cabinet minister Toshihiro Nikai.

Seko has been described as one of the core members of the "Abe Faction" of the LDP.

== Honours ==
- Netherlands: Grand Officer of the Order of Orange-Nassau (29 October 2014)

Political offices
Preceded by Motoo Hayashi	Minister of Economy, Trade and Industry; 2016–2019	Succeeded by Isshu Sugawara
