= Arida District =

District in Wakayama prefecture, Japan

Coordinates: 34.038170°N 135.194133°E

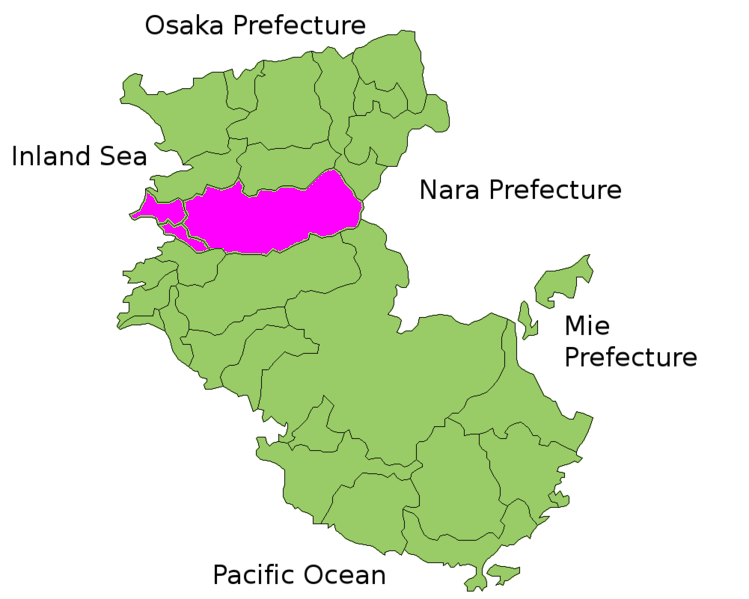
Location of Arida District in Wakayama Prefecture

Arida District (有田郡, Arida-gun) is a district located in Wakayama Prefecture, Japan.

As of September 1, 2008, the district has an estimated population of 50,095 and a density of 114 persons/km^{2}. The total area is 438 km^{2}.

== Towns and villages ==
- Aridagawa
- Hirogawa
- Yuasa

== Neighbouring Regions ==
- Yoshino district, Nara Prefecture, Japan
- Arida City, Wakayama Prefecture, Japan
- Hidaka District, Wakayama Prefecture, Japan
- Tanabe City, Wakayama Prefecture, Japan
- Ito District, Wakayama Prefecture, Japan
- Kainan City, Wakayama Prefecture, Japan
- Kaisō District, Wakayama Prefecture, Japan

== Merger ==
- On 1 January 2006 - the towns of Kanaya, Kibi and Shimizu merged to form the new town of Aridagawa.
