= Kimino =

Kimino 紀美野町
- Town
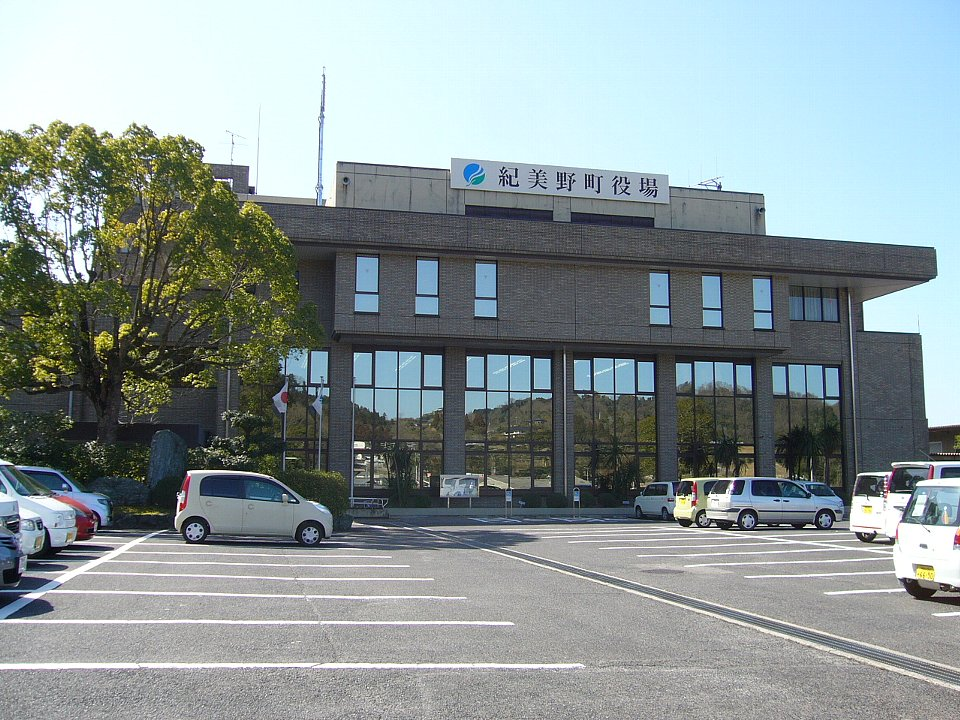
- Kimino town office

- Flag Emblem

- Location of Kimino in Wakayama Prefecture

- Location in Japan
- Coordinates: 34°10′N 135°18′E
- Country: Japan
- Region: Kansai
- Prefecture: Wakayama
- District: Kaisō

Area
  - Total: 128.34 km^{2} (49.55 sq mi)

Population (June 30, 2021)
  - Total: 8,362
  - Density: 65.16/km^{2} (168.8/sq mi)
- Time zone: UTC+09:00 (JST)
- City hall address: 287 Todoroki, Kimino-cho, Kaiso-gun, Wakayama-ken 640-1192
- Website: Official website
- Symbols
- Bird: Japanese wagtail
- Flower: Sakura
- Tree: Torreya nucifera

Kimino (紀美野町, Kimino-chō) is a town located within the center of Kaisō District, Wakayama Prefecture, Japan. As of 30 June 2021, the town had an estimated population of 8,362 in 4129 households and a population density of 65 persons per km^{2}. The total area of the town is 128.34 square kilometres (49.55 sq mi).

== Geography ==
Kimino is located in an inland area of north-central Wakayama prefecture. The Kishi River runs west through the central part of the town.

=== Neighboring municipalities ===
Wakayama Prefecture

- Kainan
- Kinokawa
- Aridagawa
- Katsuragi

== Climate ==
Kimino has a humid subtropical climate (Köppen Cfa) characterized by warm summers and cool winters with light to no snowfall. The average annual temperature in Kimino is 15.1 °C. The average annual rainfall is 1713 mm with September as the wettest month. The temperatures are highest on average in August, at around 26.2 °C, and lowest in January, at around 4.5 °C.

== Demographics ==
Per Japanese census data, the population of Kimino has declined to almost half of what it was 60 years ago.

Historical population
Year	Pop.	±%
1960	19,479	—
1970	16,148	−17.1%
1980	15,625	−3.2%
1990	14,215	−9.0%
2000	12,287	−13.6%
2010	10,395	−15.4%

== History ==
Kimino was founded on January 1, 2006, as a merger between the towns of Misato and Nokami, both from Kaisō District.

== Government ==
Kimino has a mayor-council form of government with a directly elected mayor and a unicameral town council of 12 members. Kimino, collectively with the city of Kainan and the other municipalities of Kaisō District, contributes three members to the Wakayama Prefectural Assembly. In terms of national politics, the town is part of Wakayama 2nd district of the lower house of the Diet of Japan.

== Economy ==
Agriculture, particularly horticulture, is the mainstay of the local economy.

== Education ==
Kimino has three public elementary schools and two public middle schools operated by the town government and two public high schools operated by the Wakayama Prefectural Department of Education, which are branches of high schools in the city of Kainan. There are also two private high schools.

== Transportation ==
=== Railway ===
Kimino has no passenger rail transport. The nearest train station is the JR West Kainan Station in the neighboring city of Kainan.

=== Highway ===
- National Route 370

== Local attractions ==
- "Jusanjinja" (十三神社, Jusan-jinja), a Shinto shrine along the Kishi River (貴志川, Kishi-gawa). The main shrine (本殿, Honden) and two auxiliary shrines (摂社, Sessha) are designated as Important Cultural Property of Japan.
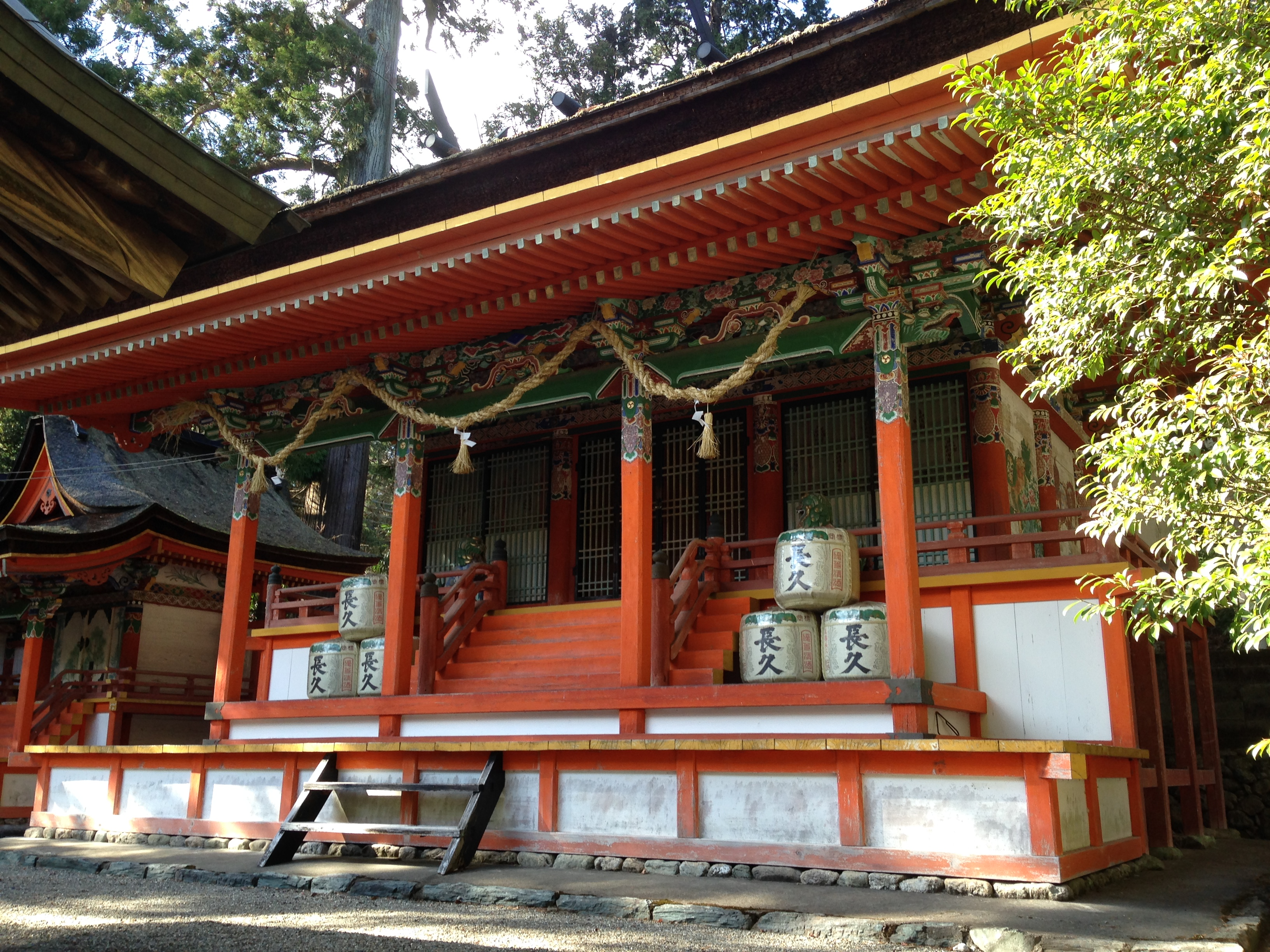
Main shrine

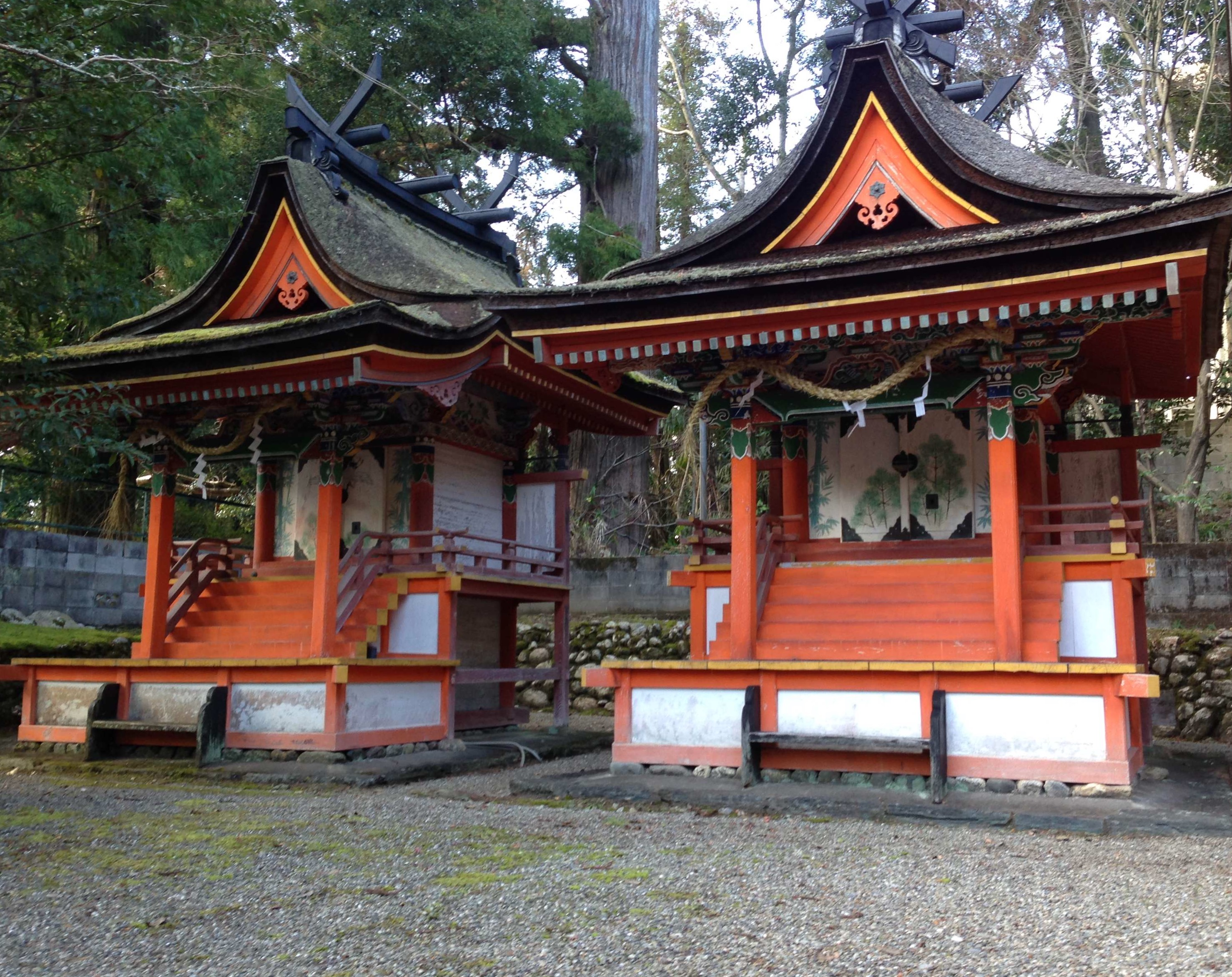
Two auxiliary shrines
