= Aridagawa =

Aridagawa 有田川町
- Town
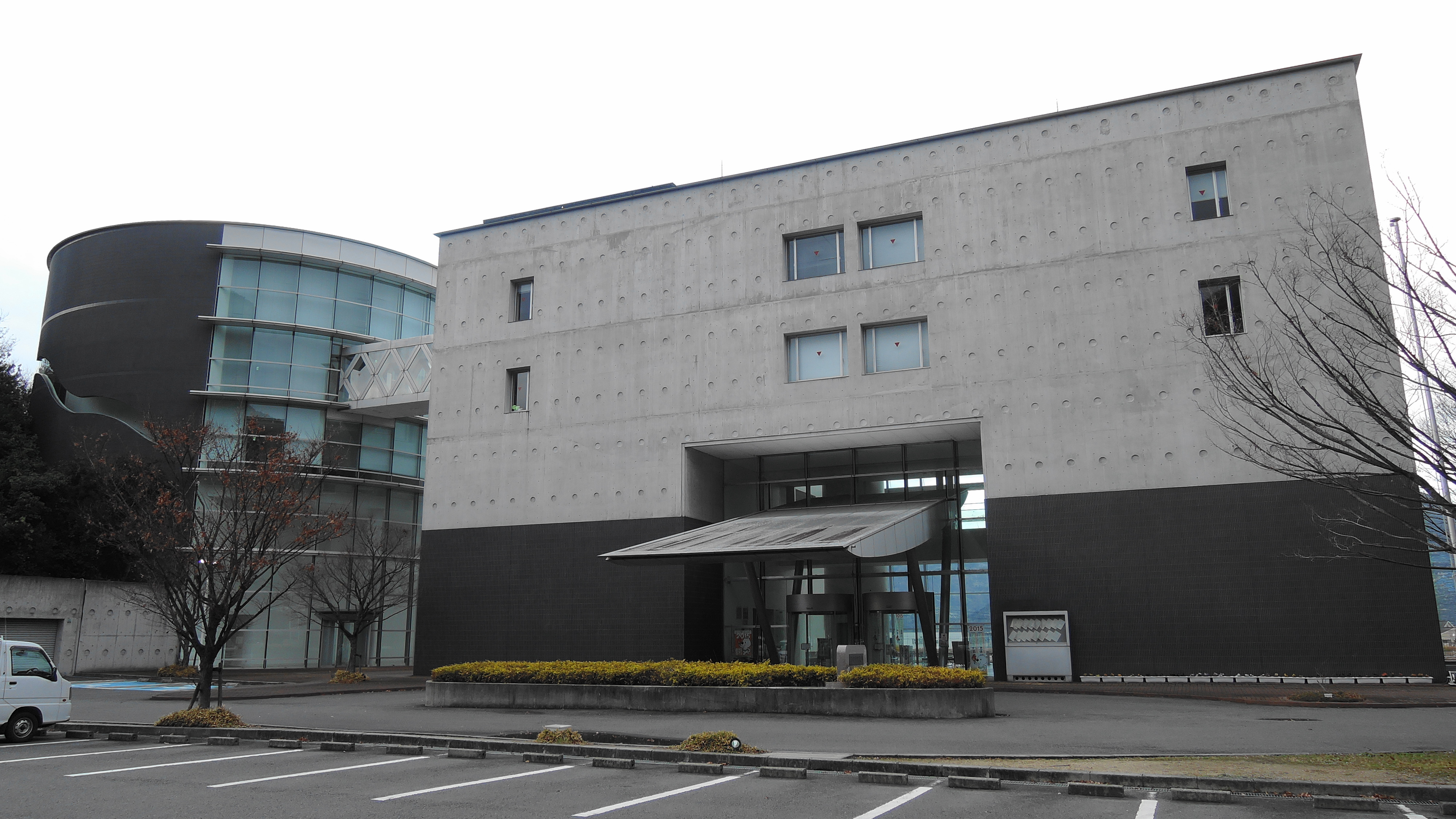
- Aridagawa Town hall

- Flag Emblem

- Location of Aridagawa in Wakayama Prefecture

- Location in Japan
- Coordinates: 34°3′N 135°13′E
- Country: Japan
- Region: Kansai
- Prefecture: Wakayama
- District: Arida

Government
  - Mayor: Masataka Nakayama

Area
  - Total: 351.84 km^{2} (135.85 sq mi)

Population (November 30, 2021)
  - Total: 25,940
  - Density: 73.73/km^{2} (191.0/sq mi)
- Time zone: UTC+09:00 (JST)
- City hall address: 2018-4 Shimotsuno, Aridagawa-cho, Arida-gun, Wakayama-ken, Japan 643-0021
- Climate: Cfa
- Website: Official website
- Symbols
- Bird: Varied tit
- Flower: Cosmos
- Tree: Citrus unshiu

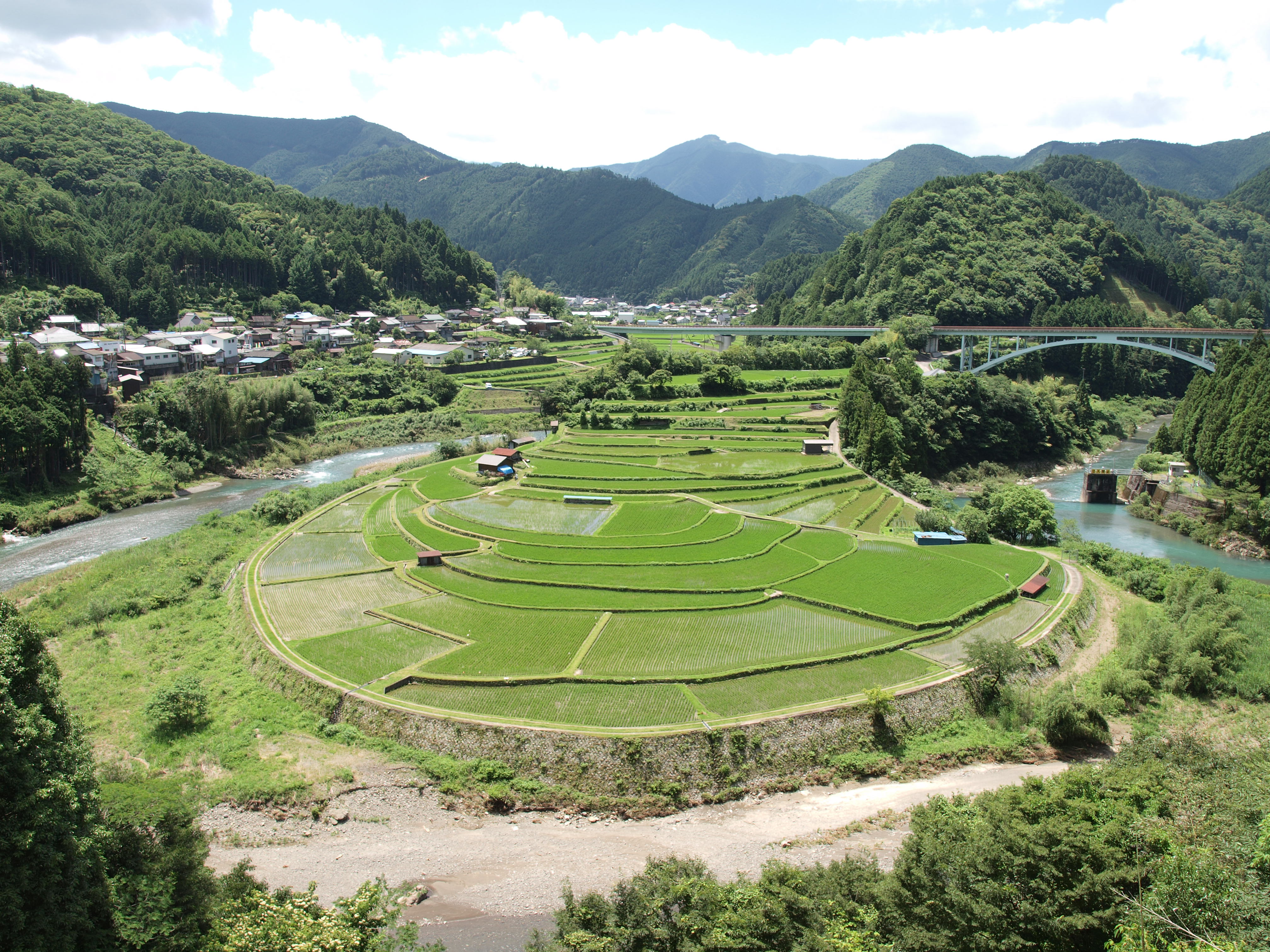
Aragijima rice terraces

Aridagawa (有田川町, Aridagawa-chō) is a town located in Arida District, in central Wakayama Prefecture, Japan. As of 30 November 2021, the town had an estimated population of 25,940 in 10680 households and a population density of 74 persons per km^{2}. The total area of the town is 351.84 square kilometres (135.85 sq mi).

== Geography ==
Aridagawa is located in the north-center of Wakayama prefecture, with the Aridagawa River running through the center of the town. Although there are some flatlands along the Aridagawa River, most of the town tends to be mountainous.

- Mountains: Mt. Washigamine (589m)
- Flatlands: Aridagawa Plain
- Rivers: Aridagawa River (Futagawa Dam)It was established on January 1, 2006, by the merger of the towns of Kanaya, Kibi and Shimizu, all from Arida District.

=== Neighboring municipalities ===
Wakayama Prefecture

Arida, Kainan, Tanabe
Arida District: Yuasa, Hirogawa
Kaisō District: Kimino
Hidaka District: Hidakagawa
Ito District: Katsuragi

Nara Prefecture

Yoshino District: Nosegawa

=== Climate ===
Aridagawa has a humid subtropical climate (Köppen Cfa) characterized by warm summers and cool winters with light to no snowfall. The average annual temperature in Aridagawa is 13.9 °C (57.0 °F). The average annual rainfall is 2,097.3 mm (82.57 in) with July as the wettest month. The temperatures are highest on average in August, at around 25.2 °C (77.4 °F), and lowest in January, at around 2.9 °C (37.2 °F). The area is subject to typhoons in summer.

Climate data for Shimizu, Aridagawa (1991−2020 normals, extremes 1979−present)
Month	Jan	Feb	Mar	Apr	May	Jun	Jul	Aug	Sep	Oct	Nov	Dec	Year
Record high °C (°F)	19.2 (66.6)	21.2 (70.2)	24.4 (75.9)	29.6 (85.3)	31.8 (89.2)	34.3 (93.7)	36.6 (97.9)	37.0 (98.6)	34.4 (93.9)	30.5 (86.9)	26.6 (79.9)	23.6 (74.5)	37.0 (98.6)
Mean daily maximum °C (°F)	8.0 (46.4)	9.3 (48.7)	13.3 (55.9)	19.0 (66.2)	23.7 (74.7)	26.2 (79.2)	29.9 (85.8)	31.2 (88.2)	27.6 (81.7)	21.9 (71.4)	16.3 (61.3)	10.6 (51.1)	19.8 (67.6)
Daily mean °C (°F)	2.9 (37.2)	3.8 (38.8)	7.1 (44.8)	12.3 (54.1)	17.2 (63.0)	20.9 (69.6)	24.6 (76.3)	25.2 (77.4)	21.8 (71.2)	15.9 (60.6)	10.1 (50.2)	5.0 (41.0)	13.9 (57.0)
Mean daily minimum °C (°F)	−1.3 (29.7)	−0.9 (30.4)	1.6 (34.9)	6.2 (43.2)	11.4 (52.5)	16.6 (61.9)	20.7 (69.3)	21.1 (70.0)	17.6 (63.7)	11.4 (52.5)	5.3 (41.5)	0.7 (33.3)	9.2 (48.6)
Record low °C (°F)	−9.4 (15.1)	−8.3 (17.1)	−5.3 (22.5)	−2.8 (27.0)	0.2 (32.4)	5.8 (42.4)	11.6 (52.9)	13.1 (55.6)	7.4 (45.3)	0.3 (32.5)	−2.3 (27.9)	−5.2 (22.6)	−9.4 (15.1)
Average precipitation mm (inches)	80.7 (3.18)	97.7 (3.85)	145.6 (5.73)	156.9 (6.18)	184.0 (7.24)	263.4 (10.37)	303.5 (11.95)	215.9 (8.50)	262.3 (10.33)	188.9 (7.44)	114.9 (4.52)	83.6 (3.29)	2,097.3 (82.57)
Average precipitation days (≥ 1.0 mm)	10.1	9.8	11.9	10.6	10.8	13.5	12.0	10.4	11.1	10.2	8.1	9.9	128.4
Mean monthly sunshine hours	93.8	104.4	145.0	179.2	188.4	122.6	155.4	191.1	141.2	143.6	125.8	102.3	1,703
Source: Japan Meteorological Agency

== Demographics ==
Per Japanese census data, the population of Aridagawa has been declining steadily over the past 70 years.

Historical population
Year	Pop.	±%
1920	34,171	—
1930	35,379	+3.5%
1940	35,886	+1.4%
1950	41,621	+16.0%
1960	38,049	−8.6%
1970	32,478	−14.6%
1980	30,944	−4.7%
1990	29,870	−3.5%
2000	29,563	−1.0%
2010	27,173	−8.1%

== History ==
Aridagawa was established on January 1, 2006, by the merger of the towns of Kanaya, Kibi and Shimizu, all from Arida District.

== Government ==
Aridagawa has a mayor-council form of government with a directly elected mayor and a unicameral city council of 16 members. Hidaka collectively with the other municipalities of Arida District, contributes two members to the Wakayama Prefectural Assembly. In terms of national politics, the town is part of Wakayama 3rd district of the lower house of the Diet of Japan.

== Economy ==
The economy of Aridagawa is dominated by agriculture (horticulture), especially with citrus fruits. The town is also a major producer of sanshō pepper.

== Education ==
Aridagawa has nine public elementary schools and four public middle schools operated by the town government, and one public high school operated by the Wakayama Prefectural Board of Education..

== Transportation ==
=== Railway ===
JR West – Kisei Main Line

- Fujinami Station

=== Highways ===
- Hanwa Expressway Road
- Yuasa-Gobo Road
- National Route 42
- National Route 371
- National Route 424
- National Route 480

== Local attractions ==
- Aragijima rice terraces
- Kōya-Ryūjin Quasi-National Park
