= Shimizu, Wakayama =

Dissolved municipality in Wakayama prefecture, Japan

Shimizu (清水町, Shimizu-chō) was a town located in Arida District, Wakayama Prefecture, Japan.

== Population ==
As of 2003, the town had an estimated population of 4,961 and a density of 25.32 persons per km^{2}. The total area was 195.96 km^{2}.

== History ==
On January 1, 2006, Shimizu, along with the towns of Kanaya and Kibi (all from Arida District), was merged to create the town of Aridagawa.
