= Misato, Wakayama =

Dissolved municipality in Wakayama Prefecture, Japan

Misato (美里町, Misato-chō) was a town located in Kaisō District, Wakayama Prefecture, Japan.

As of 2003, the town has an estimated population of 3,852 and a density of 43.06 inhabitants per square kilometre (111.5/sq mi). The total area is 89.45 square kilometres (34.54 sq mi).

On January 1, 2006, Misato, along with the town of Nokami (also from Kaisō District), was merged to create the town of Kimino.

Misato is home to Misato Astronomical observatory. It also produces a heavy crop of fruit in the form of both Mikans and Persimmons.
