= Kanaya, Wakayama =

Dissolved municipality in Wakayama prefecture, Japan

Kanaya (金屋町, Kanaya-chō) was a town located in Arida District, Wakayama Prefecture, Japan.

As of 2003, the town had an estimated population of 9,405 and a density of 78.74 persons per km^{2}. The total area was 119.44 km^{2}.

On January 1, 2006, Kanaya, along with the towns of Kibi and Shimizu (all from Arida District), was merged to create the town of Aridagawa.
