= Wakayama Prefectural Museum of Natural History =

- 和歌山県立自然博物館
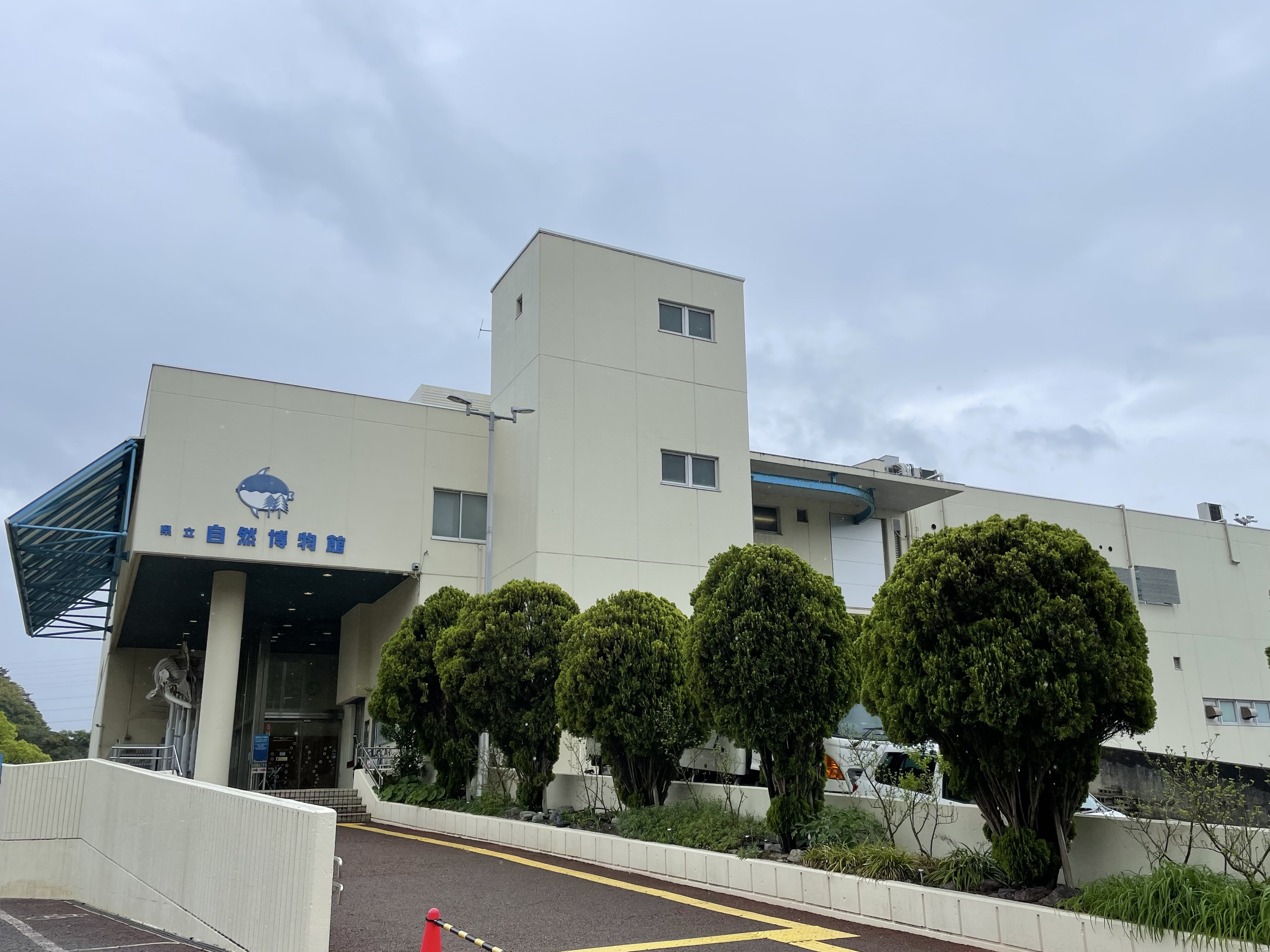
- Interactive map of the Wakayama Prefectural Museum of Natural History area

General information
- Location: 370-1 Funao, Kainan, Wakayama Prefecture, Japan
- Coordinates: 34°09′32″N 135°11′31″E
- Opened: 27 July 1982

Website
- Official website

Wakayama Prefectural Museum of Natural History (和歌山県立自然博物館, Wakayama Kenritsu Shizen Hakubutsukan) opened in Kainan, Wakayama Prefecture in 1982. The displays relate to the geology, flora, and fauna of the area, while the research collection includes some 167,000 specimens. The first exhibition room is an aquarium, and many specimens are displayed in the second room. The Museum is accredited as a Registered Museum by the Museum Act from Ministry of Education, Culture, Sports, Science and Technology.

== See also ==
- Wakayama Prefectural Museum
- Kagoshima City Museum of Art
