= Kii-Miyahara Station =

Railway station in Arida, Wakayama Prefecture, Japan

Kii-Miyahara Station 紀伊宮原駅
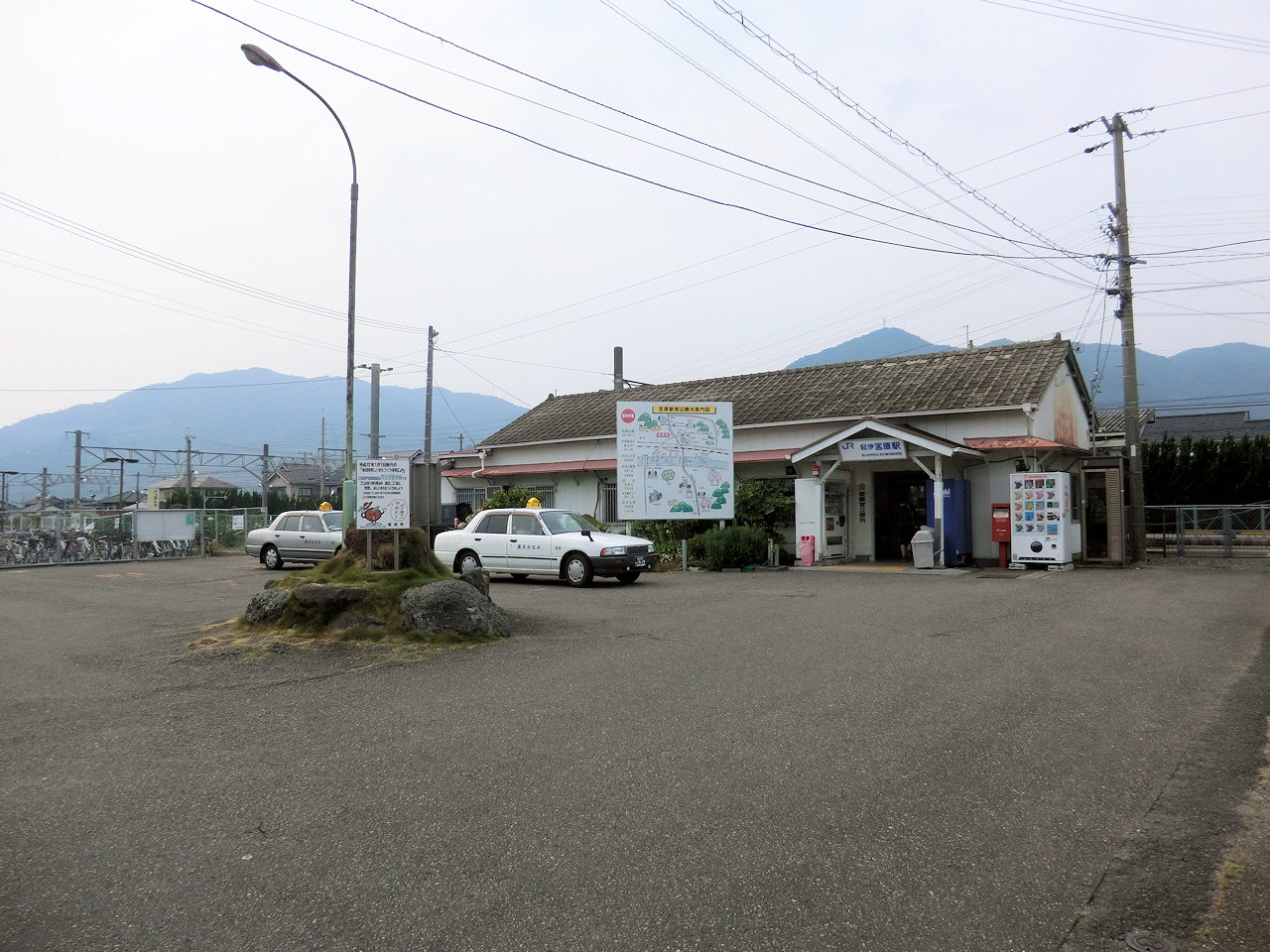
- Kii-Miyahara Station in July 2012

General information
- Location: 336 Takigahara Miyahara-cho, Arida-shi, Wakayama-ken 649-0435; Japan
- Coordinates: 34.0782°N 135.1697°E
- System: JR-West commuter rail station
- Owner: West Japan Railway Company
- Operator: West Japan Railway Company
- Line: W Kisei Main Line (Kinokuni Line)
- Distance: 351.2 km (218.2 miles) from Kameyama; 171.0 km (106.3 miles) from Shingū
- Platforms: 1 side +1 island platform
- Tracks: 2
- Train operators: West Japan Railway Company

Construction
- Structure type: At grade
- Accessible: None

Other information
- Status: Unstaffed
- Website: Official website

History
- Opened: 11 December 1925
- Electrified: 1978

Passengers
- FY2019: 590 daily
Services
| Preceding station | JR-West | Following station |
W Kisei Main Line (Kinokuni Line)
Limited Express Kuroshio: Does not stop at this station
Rapid: Does not stop at this station
| Fujinami | Local | Minoshima |
Location
- Location within Wakayama Prefecture Location within Japan

Kii-Miyahara Station (紀伊宮原駅, Kii-Miyahara-eki) is a passenger railway station in located in the city of Arida, Wakayama Prefecture, Japan, operated by West Japan Railway Company (JR West).

== Lines ==
Kii-Miyahara Station is served by the Kisei Main Line (Kinokuni Line), and is located 351.2 kilometers from the terminus of the line at Kameyama Station and 171.0 kilometers from Shingū.

== Station layout ==
The station consists of one side platform and one island platform connected to the station building by a footbridge; however, one side of the island platform is not in use. The station is unattended.

=== Platforms ===
| 1 | ■ W Kisei Main Line (Kinokuni Line) | for Wakayama and Tennōji |
| 3 | ■ W Kisei Main Line (Kinokuni Line) | for Gobō and Shingū |

== Adjacent stations ==
| « | Service | » |
West Japan Railway Company (JR West)
Kisei Main Line
Limited Express Kuroshio: Does not stop at this station
Rapid: Does not stop at this station
| Fujinami | Local | Minoshima |

== History ==
Kii-Miyahara Station opened on December 11, 1925. With the privatization of the Japan National Railways (JNR) on April 1, 1987, the station came under the aegis of the West Japan Railway Company.

== Passenger statistics ==
In fiscal 2019, the station was used by an average of 590 passengers daily (boarding passengers only).

== Surrounding Area ==
- Wakayama Prefectural Minoshima High School Miyahara School Building
- Arida Municipal Bunsei Junior High School
- Arida City Miyahara Elementary School

== See also ==
- List of railway stations in Japan
