= Minoshima Station =

Railway station in Arida, Wakayama Prefecture, Japan

Minoshima Station 箕島駅
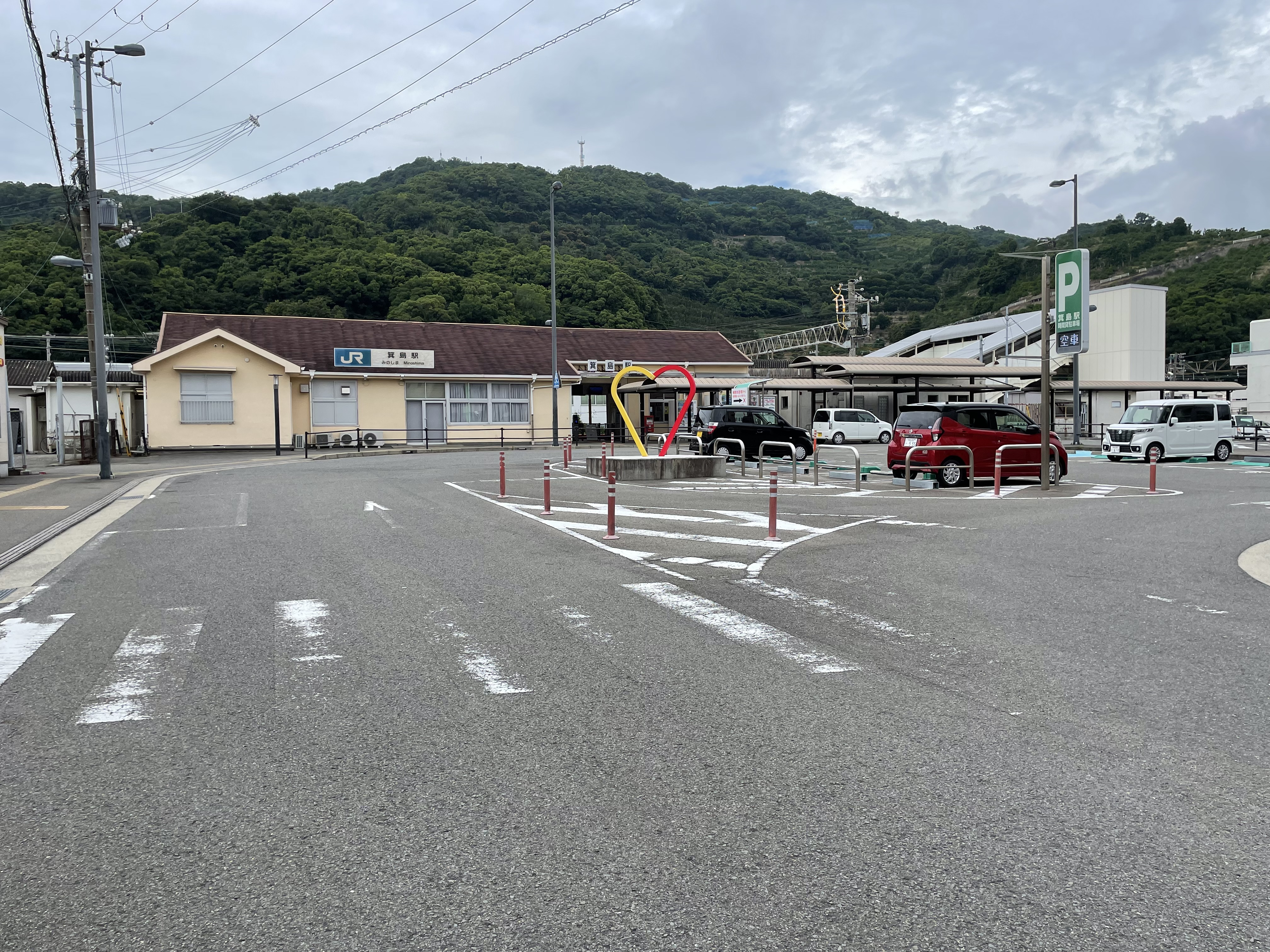
- Minoshima Station in June 2021

General information
- Location: 893 Minoshima, Arida-shi, Wakayama-ken 649-0304; Japan
- Coordinates: 34.0853°N 135.1244°E
- System: JR-West commuter rail station
- Owner: West Japan Railway Company
- Operator: West Japan Railway Company
- Line: W Kisei Main Line (Kinokuni Line)
- Distance: 355.6 km (221.0 miles) from Kameyama; 175.4 km (109.0 miles) from Shingū
- Platforms: 1 side + 1 island platform
- Tracks: 3
- Train operators: West Japan Railway Company

Construction
- Structure type: At grade

Other information
- Status: Unstaffed
- Website: Official website

History
- Opened: 28 February 1924
- Electrified: 1978

Passengers
- FY2019: 1642 daily
Services
Preceding station	JR-West	Following station
W Kisei Main Line (Kinokuni Line)
Fujinami	Limited Express Kuroshio	Kainan
Fujinami	Rapid	Kamogō
Kii-Miyahara	Local	Hatsushima
Location
- Location within Wakayama Prefecture Location within Japan

Minoshima Station (箕島駅, Minoshima-eki) is a passenger railway station in located in the city of Arida, Wakayama Prefecture, Japan, operated by West Japan Railway Company (JR West).

== Lines ==
Minoshima Station is served by the Kisei Main Line (Kinokuni Line), and is located 355.6 kilometers from the terminus of the line at Kameyama Station and 175.4 kilometers from Shingū.

== Station layout ==
The station consists of one side platform and one island platform connected to the station building by a footbridge. The station is staffed.

=== Platforms ===
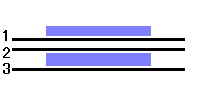
→:for Hatsushima ←:for Kii-Miyahara

1	■ W Kisei Main Line (Kinokuni Line)	for Wakayama and Tennōji
2	■ W Kisei Main Line (Kinokuni Line)	for bidirectional service
3	■ W Kisei Main Line (Kinokuni Line)	for Gobō and Shingū

== Adjacent stations ==
«	Service	»
West Japan Railway Company (JR West)
Kisei Main Line
Fujinami	Limited Express Kuroshio	Kainan
Fujinami	Rapid	Kamogō
Kii-Miyahara	Local	Hatsushima

== History ==
Minoshima Station opened on February 28, 1924. With the privatization of the Japan National Railways (JNR) on April 1, 1987, the station came under the aegis of the West Japan Railway Company.

== Passenger statistics ==
In fiscal 2019, the station was used by an average of 1642 passengers daily (boarding passengers only).

== Surrounding Area ==
- Arida City Hall
- Arida Civic Center
- Arita City Library
- Arida City Folk Museum
- Arida Mikan Museum

== See also ==
- List of railway stations in Japan
