= Kuroe Station =

Railway station in Kainan, Wakayama Prefecture, Japan

Kuroe Station 黒江駅
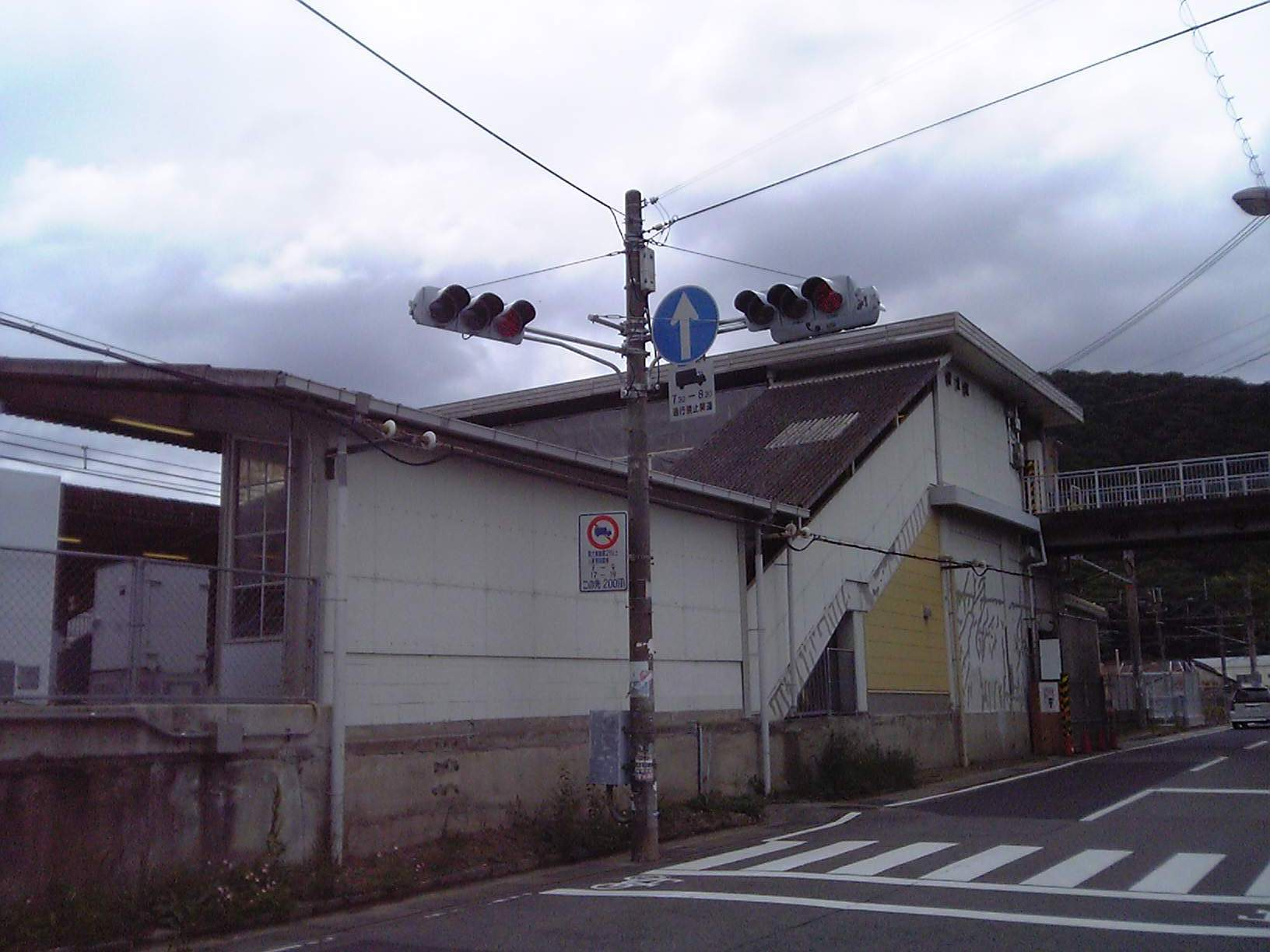
- Station building, June 2010

General information
- Location: 608-5 Okada Yokoyama, Kainan-shi, Wakayama-ken 642-0012; Japan
- Coordinates: 34.1704°N 135.2101°E
- System: JR-West commuter rail station
- Owner: West Japan Railway Company
- Operator: West Japan Railway Company
- Line: W Kisei Main Line (Kinokuni Line)
- Distance: 372.3 km (231.3 miles) from Kameyama; 192.1 km (119.4 miles) from Shingū
- Platforms: 2 side platforms
- Tracks: 2
- Train operators: West Japan Railway Company

Construction
- Structure type: At grade

Other information
- Status: Unstaffed
- Website: Official website

History
- Opened: 1 November 1966
- Electrified: 1978

Passengers
- FY2019: 2527 daily
Services
Preceding station	JR-West	Following station
W Kisei Main Line (Kinokuni Line)
Limited Express Kuroshio: Does not stop at this station
Kainan	Local	Kimiidera
Kainan	Rapid	Kimiidera
Location
- Location within Wakayama Prefecture Location within Japan

Kuroe Station (黒江駅, Kuroe-eki) is a passenger railway station in located in the city of Kainan, Wakayama Prefecture, Japan, operated by West Japan Railway Company (JR West).

== Lines ==
Kuroe Station is served by the Kisei Main Line (Kinokuni Line), and is located 372.3 kilometers from the terminus of the line at Kameyama Station and 192.1 kilometers from Shingū.

== Station layout ==
The station consists of two opposed side platforms connected by an elevated station building. The station is staffed.

=== Platforms ===
1	■ W Kisei Main Line (Kinokuni Line)	for Wakayama and Tennōji
2, 3	■ W Kisei Main Line (Kinokuni Line)	for Gobō and Shingū

== Adjacent stations ==
«	Service	»
West Japan Railway Company (JR West)
Kisei Main Line
Limited Express Kuroshio: Does not stop at this station
Kainan	Local	Kimiidera
Kainan	Rapid	Kimiidera

== History ==
Kuroe Station opened on November 1, 1966. With the privatization of the Japan National Railways (JNR) on April 1, 1987, the station came under the aegis of the West Japan Railway Company.

== Passenger statistics ==
In fiscal 2019, the station was used by an average of 2527 passengers daily (boarding passengers only).

== Surrounding Area ==
- Chiben Gakuen Wakayama Elementary School / Junior High School / High School
- Kimiidera Park

== See also ==
- List of railway stations in Japan
