= Kibi, Wakayama =

Dissolved municipality in Wakayama prefecture, Japan

Kibi (吉備町, Kibi-chō) was a town located on the middle courses of Arida River (有田川) in Arida District, of northwestern Wakayama Prefecture, Japan.

As of 2003, the town had an estimated population of 15,012 and a density of 412.76 persons per km^{2}. The total area was 36.37 km^{2}.

On January 1, 2006, Kibi, along with the towns of Kanaya and Shimizu (all from Arida District), was merged to create the town of Aridagawa.

It was surrounded by mountains, the highest being Komeyama. The town was known for Kishu mandarin oranges, known as きしゅう みかん in Japanese. Kibi-cho has a "Fruit Tree Experiment Station" of the "Wakayama Research Center of Agriculture, Forestry and Fisheries". Kibi-cho City Hall and Kibi Dome were created by Kisho Kurokawa and constructed in 1993–1995.

A fossil tooth of the 20-foot-long Ginsu Shark Cretoxyrhina from 100 to 82 million years ago in the Cretaceous period has been found at Atagoyama, Kibi-Cho. Mid-Cretaceous Ammonites have been found in the stratigraphy of the Aridagawa (Arida River) valley near Kibi-cho.

Osamu Higashio, a former professional baseball player (1969-1988) and manager of the Saitama Seibu Lions from 1995 to 2001, was born in Kibi-cho.
