= Masatoshi Ishida (politician) =

Japanese politician

- 石田 真敏
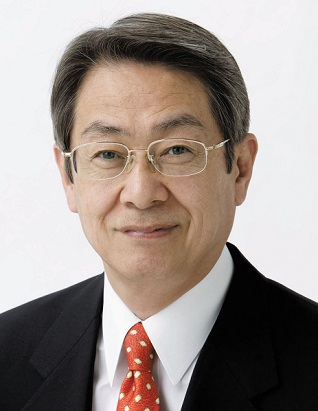
- Official portrait, 2018

Minister for Internal Affairs and Communications
- In office 2 October 2018 – 11 September 2019
- Prime Minister: Shinzo Abe
- Preceded by: Seiko Noda
- Succeeded by: Sanae Takaichi

Member of the House of Representatives
- Incumbent
- Assumed office 29 April 2002
- Preceded by: Mitsuzō Kishimoto
- Constituency: Wakayama 2nd (2002–2009); Kinki PR (2009–2012); Wakayama 2nd (2012–2024); Kinki PR (2024–present)

Mayor of Kainan
- In office 1995–2002
- Preceded by: Yuzo Yamamoto
- Succeeded by: Masami Jinde

Member of the Wakayama Prefectural Assembly
- In office 1983–1995
- Constituency: Kainan City and Kaisō District

Personal details
- Born: 11 April 1952 (age 74) Kainan, Wakayama, Japan
- Party: Liberal Democratic
- Education: Waseda University

Masatoshi Ishida (石田 真敏, Ishida Masatoshi; born 11 April 1952) is a Japanese politician of the Liberal Democratic Party and a member of the House of Representatives in the Diet (national legislature). He served as the Minister of Internal Affairs and Communications from 2 October 2018 to 11 September 2019. A native of Kainan, Wakayama and graduate of Waseda University, he was elected to the first of his three terms in the Wakayama Prefectural Assembly in 1983 and then to the first of his two terms as mayor of Kainan in 1994. He was elected to the House of Representatives for the first time in 2002.

Political offices
Preceded by Seiko Noda	Minister for Internal Affairs and Communications; 2018–2019	Succeeded by Sanae Takaichi
