= Kamogō Station =

Railway station in Kainan, Wakayama Prefecture, Japan

Kamogō Station 加茂郷駅
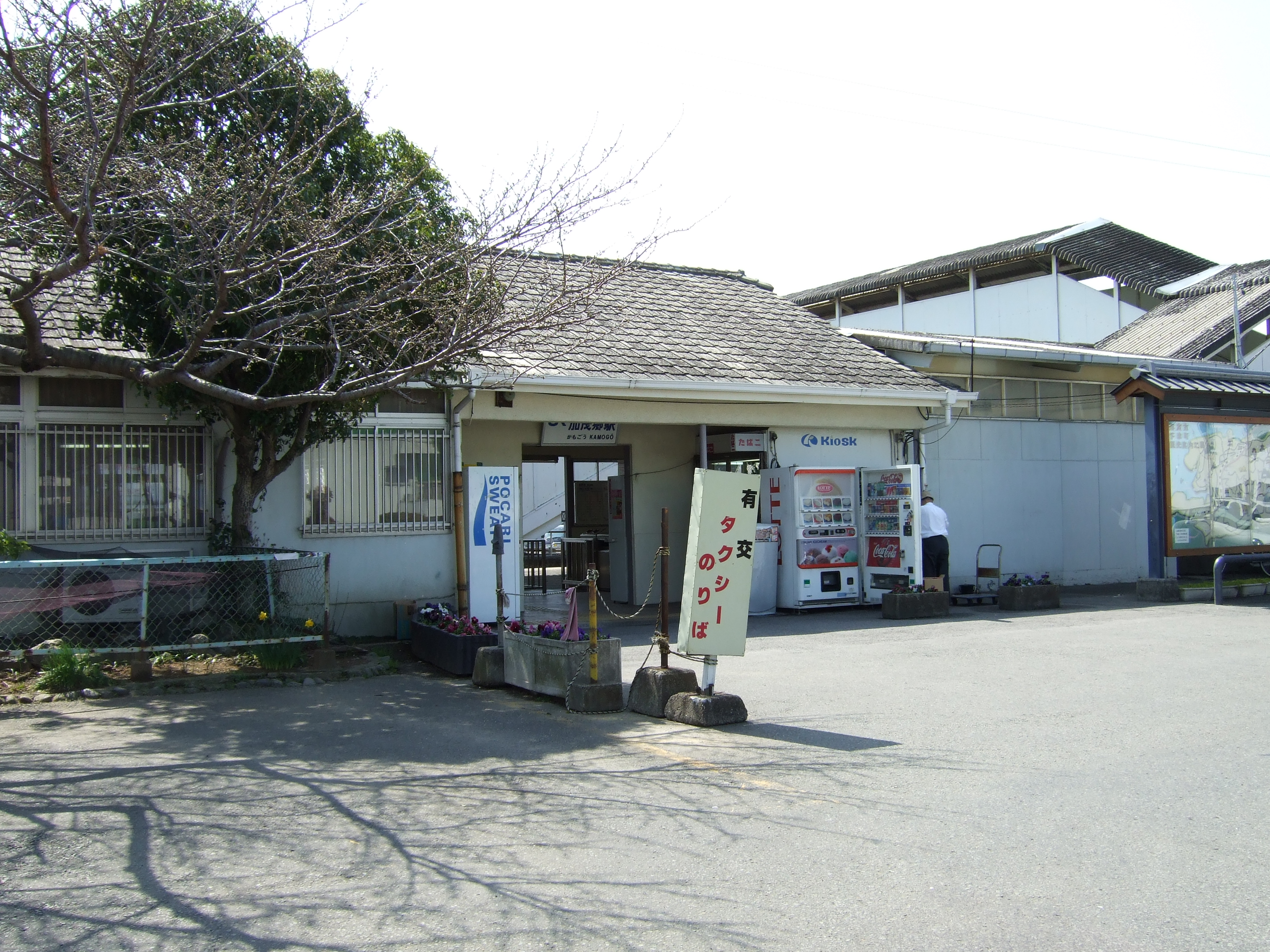
- Station building, March 2007

General information
- Location: 45-2 Marauda, Shimotsu-cho, Kainan-shi, Wakayama-ken 649-0121; Japan
- Coordinates: 34.1257°N 135.1598°E
- System: JR-West commuter rail station
- Owner: West Japan Railway Company
- Operator: West Japan Railway Company
- Line: W Kisei Main Line (Kinokuni Line)
- Distance: 363.8 km (226.1 miles) from Kameyama; 183.6 km (114.1 miles) from Shingū
- Platforms: 1 side + 1 island platform
- Tracks: 3
- Train operators: West Japan Railway Company

Construction
- Structure type: At grade

Other information
- Status: Unstaffed
- Website: Official website

History
- Opened: 28 February 1924
- Electrified: 1978

Passengers
- FY2019: 670 daily
Services
Preceding station	JR-West	Following station
W Kisei Main Line (Kinokuni Line)
Limited Express Kuroshio: Does not stop at this station
Minoshima	Rapid	Kainan
Shimotsu	Local	Shimizuura
Location
- Location within Wakayama Prefecture Location within Japan

Kamogō Station (加茂郷駅, Kamogō-eki) is a passenger railway station in located in the city of Kainan, Wakayama Prefecture, Japan, operated by West Japan Railway Company (JR West).

== Lines ==
Kamogō Station is served by the Kisei Main Line (Kinokuni Line), and is located 363.8 kilometers from the terminus of the line at Kameyama Station and 183.6 kilometers from Shingū.

== Station layout ==
The station consists of one side platform and one island platform connected to the station building by a footbridge. The station is unattended.

=== Platforms ===
1	■ W Kisei Main Line (Kinokuni Line)	for Wakayama and Tennōji
2, 3	■ W Kisei Main Line (Kinokuni Line)	for Gobō and Shingū

== Adjacent stations ==
«	Service	»
West Japan Railway Company (JR West)
Kisei Main Line
Limited Express Kuroshio: Does not stop at this station
Minoshima	Rapid	Kainan
Shimotsu	Local	Shimizuura

== History ==
Kamogō Station opened on February 28, 1924. With the privatization of the Japan National Railways (JNR) on April 1, 1987, the station came under the aegis of the West Japan Railway Company.

== Passenger statistics ==
In fiscal 2019, the station was used by an average of 670 passengers daily (boarding passengers only).

== Surrounding Area ==
- former Shimotsu Town Hall
- National Route 42
- Kainan City Shimotsu Daini Junior High School
- Wakayama Prefectural Hainan High School Shimotsu Branch School
- Kainan Municipal Hainan Shimotsu High School

== See also ==
- List of railway stations in Japan
