= Hatsushima Station =

Railway station in Arida, Wakayama Prefecture, Japan

Hatsushima Station 初島駅
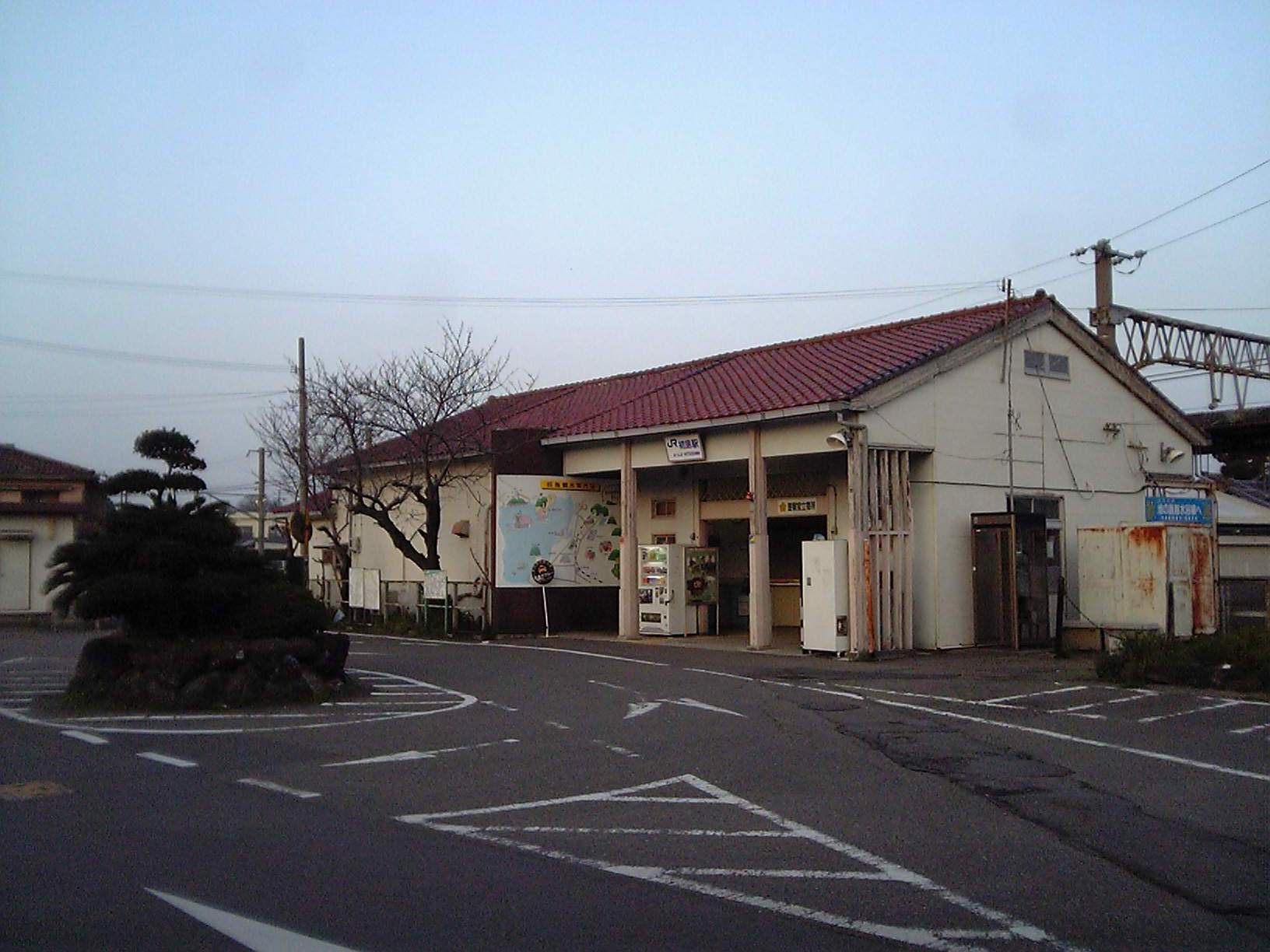
- Hatsushima Station in March 2010

General information
- Location: 1395 Hama, Hatsushima-cho, Arida-shi, Wakayama-ken 649-0306; Japan
- Coordinates: 34.0998°N 135.1152°E
- System: JR-West commuter rail station
- Owner: West Japan Railway Company
- Operator: West Japan Railway Company
- Line: W Kisei Main Line (Kinokuni Line)
- Distance: 358.1 km (222.5 miles) from Kameyama; 177.9 km (110.5 miles) from Shingū
- Platforms: 1 island platform
- Tracks: s
- Train operators: West Japan Railway Company

Construction
- Structure type: At grade

Other information
- Status: Unstaffed
- Website: Official website

History
- Opened: 15 December 1938
- Electrified: 1978

Passengers
- FY2019: 330 daily
Services
Preceding station	JR-West	Following station
W Kisei Main Line (Kinokuni Line)
Limited Express Kuroshio: Does not stop at this station
Rapid: Does not stop at this station
Minoshima	Local	Shimotsu
Location
- Location within Wakayama Prefecture Location within Japan

Hatsushima Station (初島駅, Hatsushima-eki) is a passenger railway station located in the city of Arida, Wakayama Prefecture, Japan, operated by West Japan Railway Company (JR West).

== Lines ==
Hatsushima Station is served by the Kisei Main Line (Kinokuni Line), and is located 358.1 kilometers from the terminus of the line at Kameyama Station and 177.9 kilometers from Shingū.

== Station layout ==
The station consists of one island platform connected to the station building by a footbridge. The station is staffed.

=== Platforms ===
1	■ W Kisei Main Line (Kinokuni Line)	for Wakayama and Tennōji
2	■ W Kisei Main Line (Kinokuni Line)	for Gobō and Shingū

== Adjacent stations ==
«	Service	»
West Japan Railway Company (JR West)
Kisei Main Line
Limited Express Kuroshio: Does not stop at this station
Rapid: Does not stop at this station
Minoshima	Local	Shimotsu

== History ==
Hatsushima Station opened on December 15, 1938. The current station building was completed in March 1949. With the privatization of the Japan National Railways (JNR) on April 1, 1987, the station came under the aegis of the West Japan Railway Company.

In March 2025, work commenced to replace the original station building with one that was 3D printed, believed by JR West to be the first of its kind in the world. As part of these works, it took six hours to assemble the printed parts at the station site, which took the manufacturer Serendix seven days to print. The new station building, with an area of 100 sq ft (9.3 m^{2}), features designs including the city flower Citrus unshiu and scabbardfish. The station building opened in July 2025, as scheduled. Ryo Kawamoto, the president of JR West's venture capital unit, said that the project was significant in that the number of workers required to maintain services in remote areas would be "reduced greatly".

== Passenger statistics ==
In fiscal 2019, the station was used by an average of 330 passengers daily (boarding passengers only).

== Surrounding area ==
- Arida City Hall Hatsushima Branch
- Arida City Hatsushima Elementary School
- Arida City Hatsushima Junior High School

== See also ==
- List of railway stations in Japan
