= Kimiidera Station =

Railway station in Wakayama, Wakayama Prefecture, Japan

Kimiidera Station 紀三井寺駅
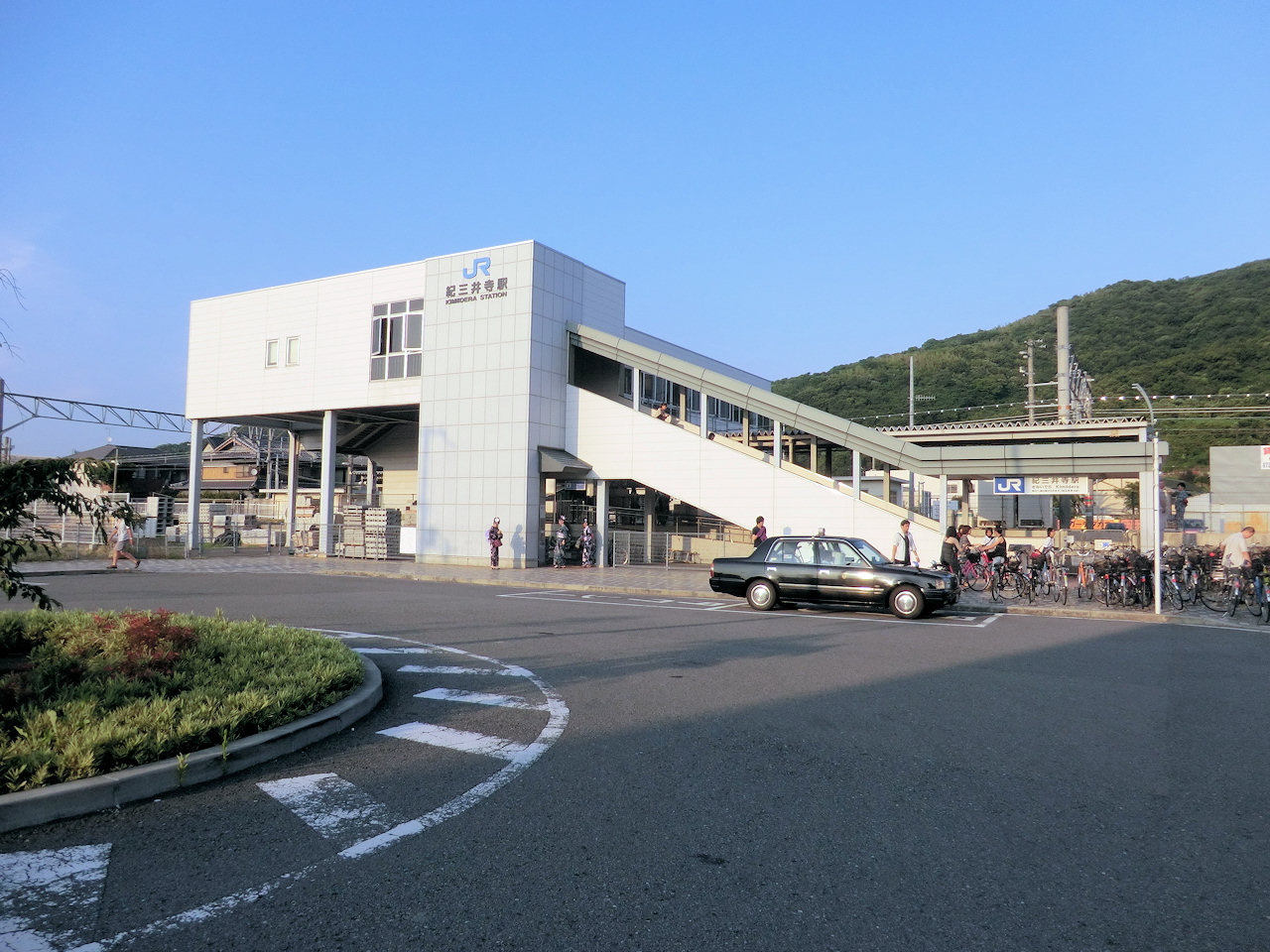
- Kimiidera Station, July 2012

General information
- Location: 107, Mikazura, Wakayama-shi, Wakayama-ken 641-0011; Japan
- Coordinates: 34°11′17.53″N 135°11′15.44″E
- Owner: West Japan Railway Company
- Operator: West Japan Railway Company
- Line: W Kisei Main Line (Kinokuni Line)
- Distance: 375.9 km (233.6 miles) from Kameyama; 195.7 km (121.6 miles) from Shingū
- Platforms: 2 side platforms
- Tracks: 2
- Train operators: West Japan Railway Company

Other information
- Status: Staffed
- Website: Official website

History
- Opened: 28 February 1928
- Electrified: 1978

Passengers
- FY2019: 2120 daily
Services
Preceding station	JR-West	Following station
W Kisei Main Line (Kinokuni Line)
Limited Express Kuroshio: Does not stop at this station
Kuroe	Local	Miyamae
Kuroe	Rapid	Wakayama
Location
- Location within Wakayama Prefecture Location within Japan

Kimiidera Station (紀三井寺駅, Kimiidera-eki) is a passenger railway station in located in the city of Wakayama, Wakayama Prefecture, Japan, operated by West Japan Railway Company (JR West).

== Lines ==
Kimiidera Station is served by the Kisei Main Line (Kinokuni Line), and is located 375.9 kilometers from the terminus of the line at Kameyama Station and 195.7 kilometers from Shingū.

== Station layout ==
The station consists of two opposed side platforms connected by an elevated station building. The station is staffed.

=== Platforms ===
1	■ W Kisei Main Line (Kinokuni Line)	for Wakayama and Tennōji
2	■ W Kisei Main Line (Kinokuni Line)	for Gobō and Shingū

== Adjacent stations ==
«	Service	»
West Japan Railway Company (JR West)
Kisei Main Line
Limited Express Kuroshio: Does not stop at this station
Kuroe	Local	Miyamae
Kuroe	Rapid	Wakayama

== History ==
Kimiidera Station opened on February 28, 1924. With the privatization of the Japan National Railways (JNR) on April 1, 1987, the station came under the aegis of the West Japan Railway Company. The current station building was completed in September 2004.

== Passenger statistics ==
In fiscal 2019, the station was used by an average of 2120 passengers daily (boarding passengers only).

== Surrounding Area ==
- Kimii-dera
- Kimiidera Park
  - Kimiidera Athletic Stadium
  - Kimiidera Baseball Stadium
- Wakayama Medical University
- National Route 42l

== See also ==
- List of railway stations in Japan
