= Shimotsu Station =

Railway station in Kainan, Wakayama Prefecture, Japan

Shimotsu Station 下津駅
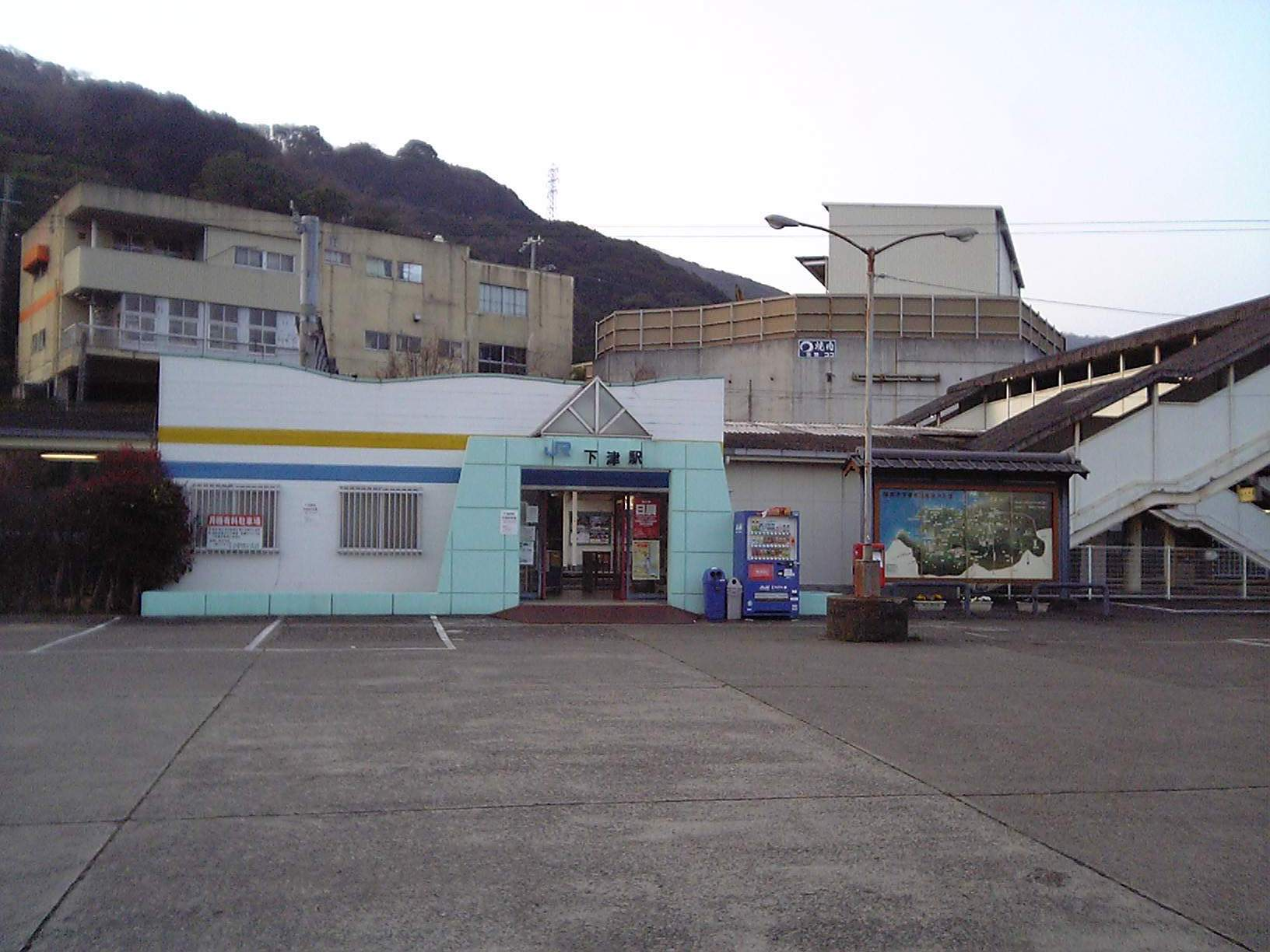
- Station building, March 2010

General information
- Location: 756-8 Shimotsu, Shimotsu-cho, Kainan-shi, Wakayama-ken 649-0101; Japan
- Coordinates: 34.1081°N 135.1455°E
- System: JR-West commuter rail station
- Owner: West Japan Railway Company
- Operator: West Japan Railway Company
- Line: W Kisei Main Line (Kinokuni Line)
- Distance: 361.1 km (224.4 miles) from Kameyama; 180.9 km (112.4 miles) from Shingū
- Platforms: 2 side platforms
- Tracks: 2
- Train operators: West Japan Railway Company

Construction
- Structure type: At grade

Other information
- Status: Unstaffed
- Website: Official website

History
- Opened: 20 August 1924
- Electrified: 1978

Passengers
- FY2019: 383 daily
Services
Preceding station	JR-West	Following station
W Kisei Main Line (Kinokuni Line)
Limited Express Kuroshio: Does not stop at this station
Rapid: Does not stop at this station
Hatsushima	Local	Kamogō
Location
- Location within Wakayama Prefecture Location within Japan

Shimotsu Station (下津駅, Shimotsu-eki) is a passenger railway station in located in the city of Kainan, Wakayama Prefecture, Japan, operated by West Japan Railway Company (JR West).

== Lines ==
Shimotsu Station is served by the Kisei Main Line (Kinokuni Line), and is located 361.1 kilometers from the terminus of the line at Kameyama Station and 180.9 kilometers from Shingū.

== Station layout ==
The station consists of two opposed side platforms connected to the station building by a footbridge. The station is unattended.

=== Platforms ===
1	■ W Kisei Main Line (Kinokuni Line)	for Wakayama and Tennōji
2	■ W Kisei Main Line (Kinokuni Line)	for Gobō and Shingū

== Adjacent stations ==
«	Service	»
West Japan Railway Company (JR West)
Kisei Main Line
Limited Express Kuroshio: Does not stop at this station
Rapid: Does not stop at this station
Hatsushima	Local	Kamogō

== History ==
Shimotsu Station opened on August 20, 1924. With the privatization of the Japan National Railways (JNR) on April 1, 1987, the station came under the aegis of the West Japan Railway Company.

== Passenger statistics ==
In fiscal 2019, the station was used by an average of 383 passengers daily (boarding passengers only).

== Surrounding Area ==
- Kainan City Shimotsu Administration Bureau Shimotsu Branch Office
- Kainan City Shimotsu Elementary School
- Kainan City Shimotsu Daiichi Junior High School

== See also ==
- List of railway stations in Japan
