= Shimizuura Station =

Railway station in Kainan, Wakayama Prefecture, Japan

Shimizuura Station 冷水浦駅
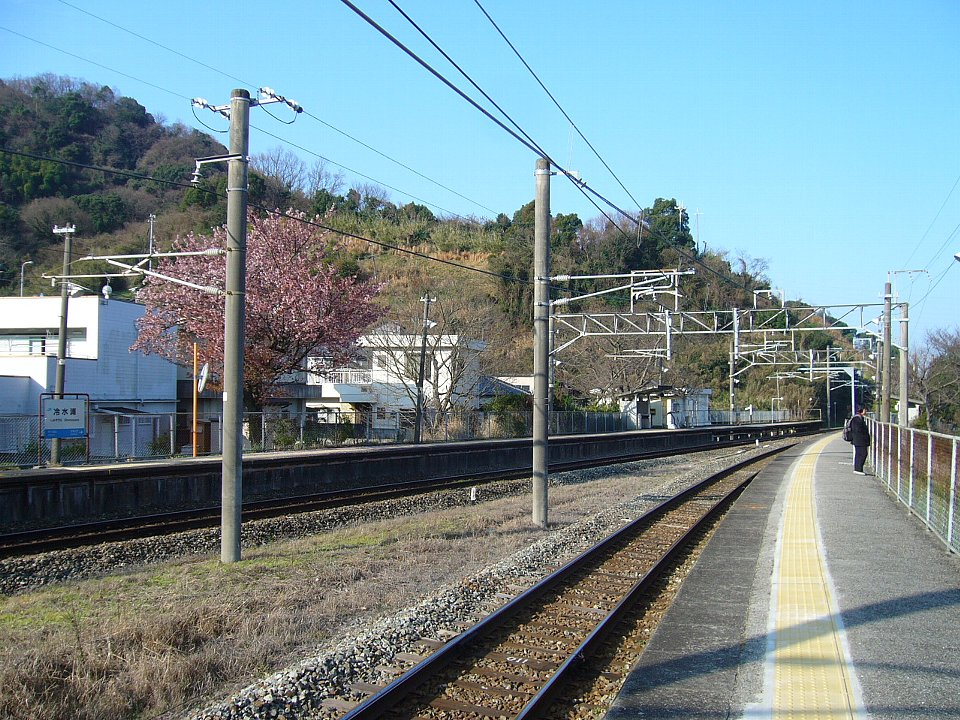
- Shimizuura Station, February 2007

General information
- Location: 318-8 Shimizu-cho, Kainan-shi, Wakayama-ken 642-0035; Japan
- Coordinates: 34.1419°N 135.1940°E
- System: JR-West commuter rail station
- Owner: West Japan Railway Company
- Operator: West Japan Railway Company
- Line: W Kisei Main Line (Kinokuni Line)
- Distance: 367.7 km (228.5 miles) from Kameyama; 187.5 km (116.5 miles) from Shingū
- Platforms: 2 side platforms
- Tracks: 2
- Train operators: West Japan Railway Company
- Bus stands: 2

Construction
- Structure type: At grade

Other information
- Status: Unstaffed
- Website: Official website

History
- Opened: 15 December 1938
- Electrified: 1978

Passengers
- FY2019: 87 daily
Services
Preceding station	JR-West	Following station
W Kisei Main Line (Kinokuni Line)
Limited Express Kuroshio: Does not stop at this station
Rapid: Does not stop at this station
Kamogō	Local	Kainan
Location
- Location within Wakayama Prefecture Location within Japan

Shimizuura Station (冷水浦駅, Shimizuura-eki) is a passenger railway station in located in the city of Kainan, Wakayama Prefecture, Japan, operated by West Japan Railway Company (JR West).

== Lines ==
Shimizuura Station is served by the Kisei Main Line (Kinokuni Line), and is located 367.7 kilometers from the terminus of the line at Kameyama Station and 187.5 kilometers from Shingū.

== Station layout ==
The station consists of two opposed side platforms connected by an underground passage. There is no station building. The station is unattended.

=== Platforms ===
1	■ W Kisei Main Line (Kinokuni Line)	for Wakayama and Tennōji
2	■ W Kisei Main Line (Kinokuni Line)	for Gobō and Shingū

== Adjacent stations ==
«	Service	»
West Japan Railway Company (JR West)
Kisei Main Line
Limited Express Kuroshio: Does not stop at this station
Rapid: Does not stop at this station
Kamogō	Local	Kainan

== History ==
Shimizuura Station opened on December 15, 1938. It was relocated 400 meters towards Wakayama on September 1, 1961. With the privatization of the Japan National Railways (JNR) on April 1, 1987, the station came under the aegis of the West Japan Railway Company.

== Passenger statistics ==
In fiscal 2019, the station was used by an average of 87 passengers daily (boarding passengers only).

== Surrounding Area ==
- National Route 42

== See also ==
- List of railway stations in Japan
