= Nokami =

Dissolved municipality in Kaisō district, Wakayama Prefecture, Japan

Nokami (野上町, Nokami-chō) was a town located in Kaisō District, Wakayama Prefecture, Japan.

As of 2003, the town had an estimated population of 7,997 and a density of 207.39 persons per km^{2}. The total area was 38.56 km^{2}.

On January 1, 2006, Nokami, along with the town of Misato (also from Kaisō District), was merged to create the town of Kimino.
