= Arida, Wakayama =

Arida 有田市
- City
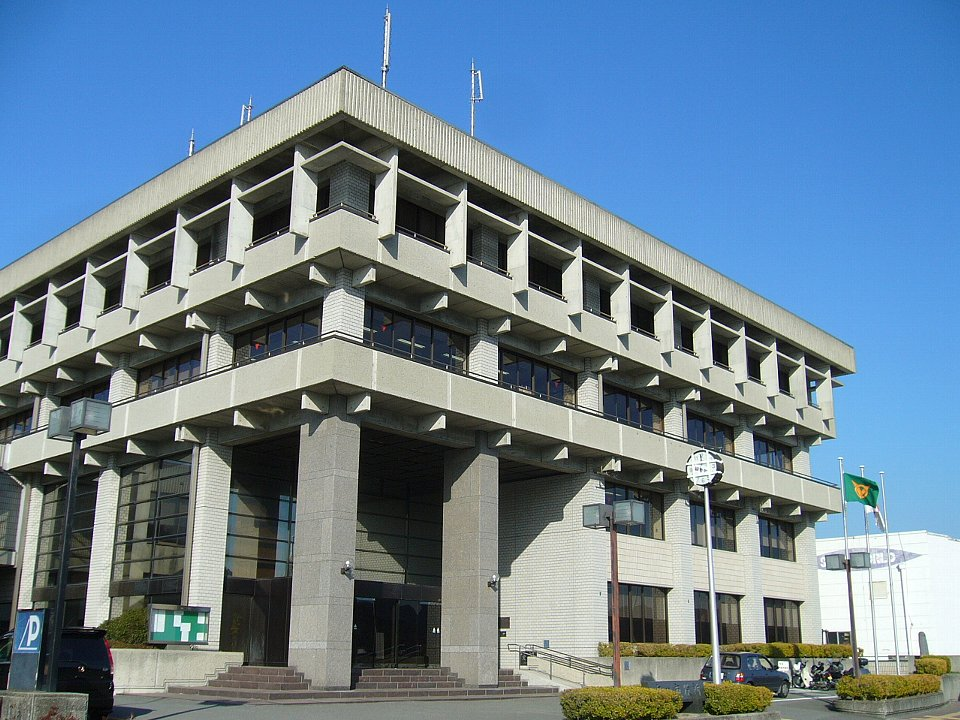
- Arida city office

- Flag Emblem
- Interactive map of Arida
- Location in Japan
- Coordinates: 34°5′N 135°8′E
- Country: Japan
- Region: Kansai
- Prefecture: Wakayama

Area
  - Total: 36.83 km^{2} (14.22 sq mi)

Population (December 1, 2021)
  - Total: 26,755
  - Density: 726.4/km^{2} (1,881/sq mi)
- Time zone: UTC+09:00 (JST)
- City hall address: 50 Minoshima, Arida-shi, Wakayama-ken 649-0304
- Website: Official website
- Symbols
- Flower: Citrus unshiu
- Tree: Castanopsis

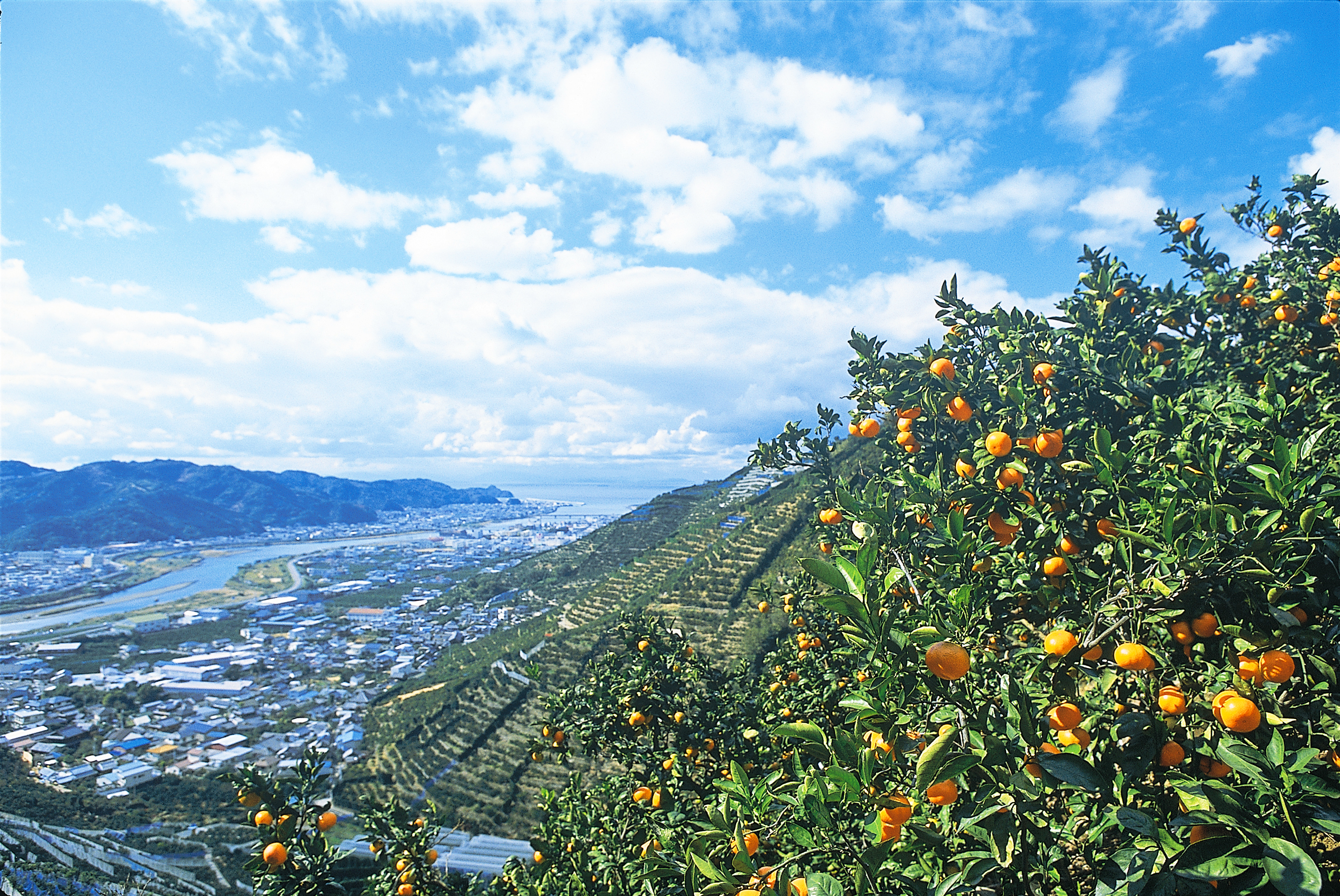
Panoramic view of Arida

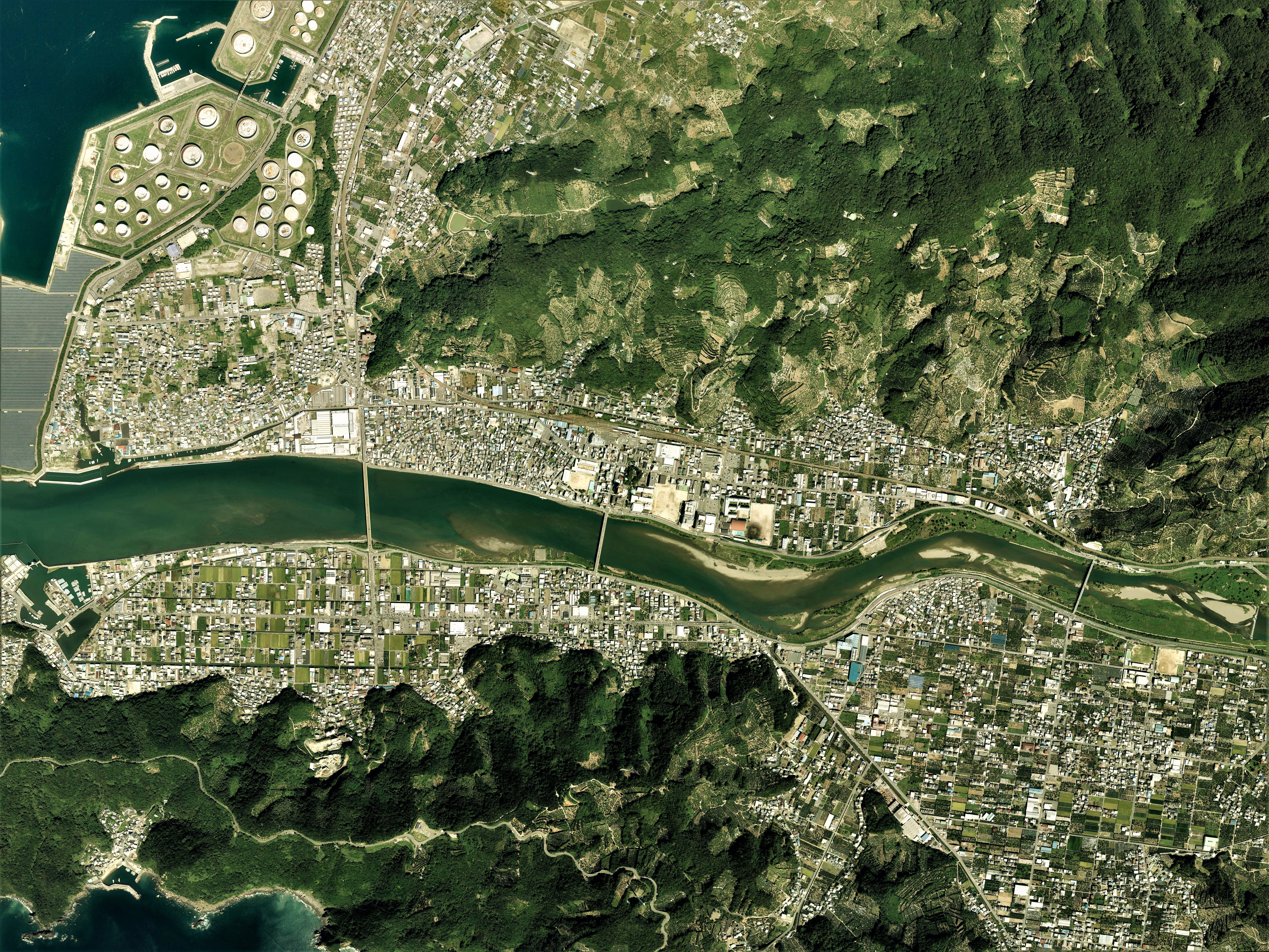
Aerial photograph of Arida City center

Arida (有田市, Arida-shi) is a city in Wakayama Prefecture, Japan. As of 1 December 2021, the city had an estimated population of 26,755 in 11737 households and a population density of 110 persons per km^{2}. The total area of the city is 36.83 square kilometres (14.22 sq mi).

== Geography ==
Arida is located in north-central Wakayama prefecture and facing the Kii Channel. It occupies an alluvial plain formed along the Aridagawa River which runs through the center of the city. The northern and southern portions of the city are lined with the steep Nagamine Mountains.

=== Neighboring municipalities ===
Wakayama Prefecture

- Aridagawa
- Kainan
- Yuasa

== Climate ==
Arida has a Humid subtropical climate (Köppen Cfa) characterized by warm summers and cool winters with light to no snowfall. The average annual temperature in Arida is 15.7 °C. The average annual rainfall is 1878 mm with September as the wettest month. The temperatures are highest on average in August, at around 26.0 °C, and lowest in January, at around 5.8 °C. The area is subject to typhoons in summer.

== Demographics ==
Per Japanese census data, the population of Arida has decreased steadily over the past 40 years.

Historical population
Year	Pop.	±%
1920	20,277	—
1930	24,107	+18.9%
1940	26,075	+8.2%
1950	32,333	+24.0%
1960	35,068	+8.5%
1970	32,457	−7.4%
1980	35,683	+9.9%
1990	34,810	−2.4%
2000	33,661	−3.3%
2010	30,605	−9.1%

== History ==
The area of the modern city of Arida was within ancient Kii Province, and the Buddhist temple of Jōmyō-ji in the city was founded in the early Heian period. The village of Miyazaki was founded with the creation of the modern municipalities system on April 1, 1889. It was raised to town status on March 16, 1901 and renamed Minoshima. On May 1, 1956 Minoshima merged with the neighboring villages of Yasuda, Miahara and Itoga to form the city of Arida.

== Government ==
Arida has a mayor-council form of government with a directly elected mayor and a unicameral city council of 15 members. Arida contributes one member to the Wakayama Prefectural Assembly. In terms of national politics, the city is part of Wakayama 2nd district of the lower house of the Diet of Japan.

== Economy ==
The largest industry in Arida is large oil refinery operated by Eneos. Traditionally, the main economic activity was horticulture, with the city being one of the largest producers of mikan or Japanese mandarins in Wakayama Prefecture.

== Education ==
Arida has seven public elementary schools and four public middle schools operated by the city government and two public high schools operated by the Wakayama Prefectural Department of Education.

== Transportation ==
=== Railway ===
JR West – Kisei Main Line

- Kii-Miyahara - Minoshima - Hatsushima

=== Highway ===
- National Route 42
- National Route 480

== Local attractions ==
- Jōmyō-ji, Buddhist temple with National Important Cultural Property Main Hall and pagoda

== Notable people from Arida ==
- Jun Toba, actor and musician
- Miki Uemura, artistic gymnast
