= Kainan Station =

Railway station in Kainan, Wakayama Prefecture, Japan

Kainan Station 海南駅
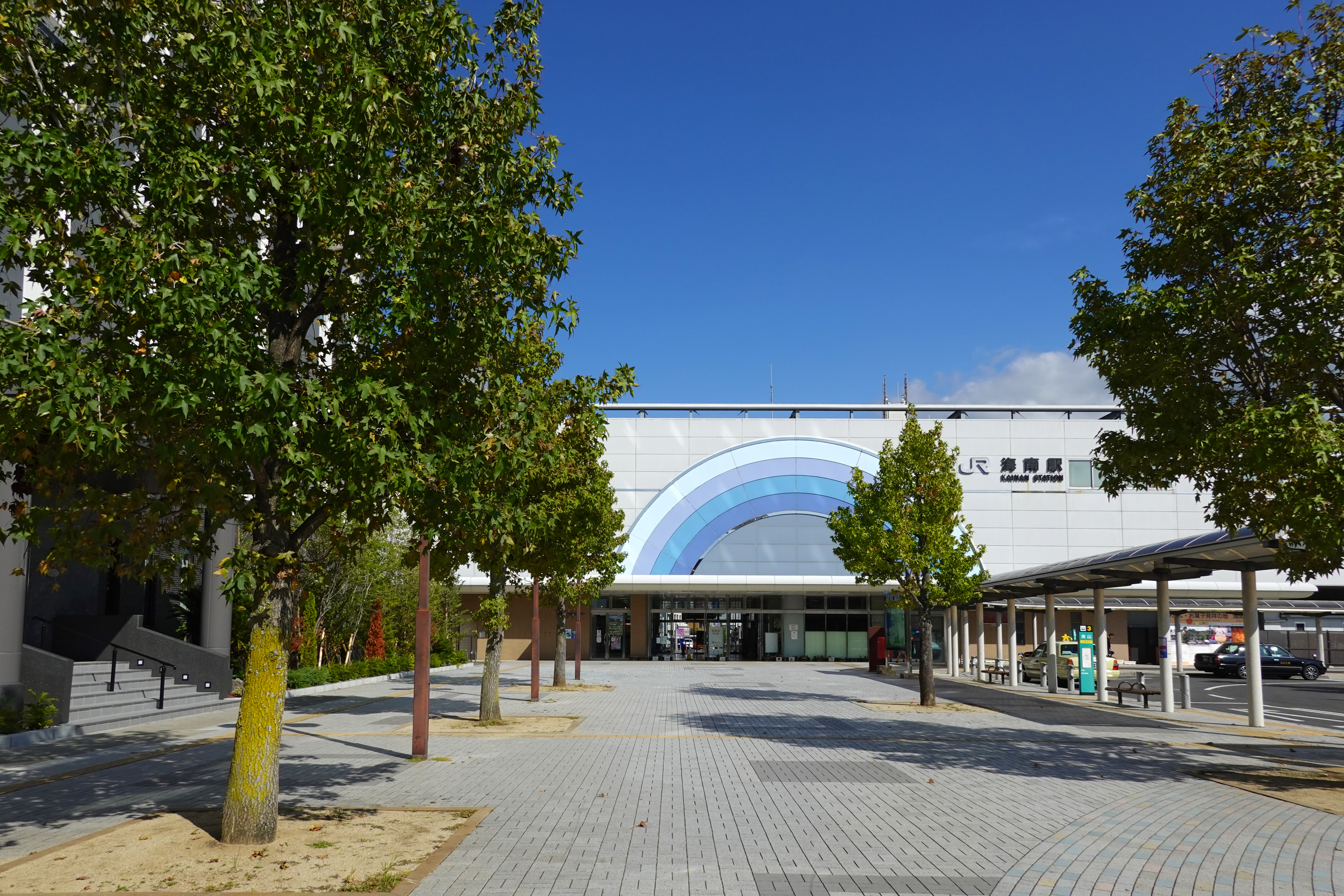
- Kainan Station, October 2024

General information
- Location: 187-8 Nataka, Kainan-shi, Wakayama-ken 642-0032; Japan
- Coordinates: 34.1545°N 135.2142°E
- System: JR-West commuter rail station
- Owner: West Japan Railway Company
- Operator: West Japan Railway Company
- Line: W Kisei Main Line (Kinokuni Line)
- Distance: 370.5 km (230.2 miles) from Kameyama; 190.3 km (118.2 miles) from Shingū
- Platforms: 2 island platforms
- Tracks: 4
- Train operators: West Japan Railway Company

Construction
- Structure type: At grade

Other information
- Status: Staffed (Midori no Madoguchi )
- Website: Official website

History
- Opened: 28 February 1924
- Electrified: 1978
- Former names: Hikatamachi (to 1936)

Passengers
- FY2019: 2802 daily
Services
Preceding station	JR-West	Following station
W Kisei Main Line (Kinokuni Line)
Minoshima	Limited Express Kuroshio	Wakayama
Kamogō	Rapid	Kuroe
Shimizuura	Local	Kuroe
Location
- Location within Wakayama Prefecture Location within Japan

Kainan Station (海南駅, Kainan-eki) is a passenger railway station in located in the city of Kainan, Wakayama Prefecture, Japan, operated by West Japan Railway Company (JR West).

== Lines ==
Kainan Station is served by the Kisei Main Line (Kinokuni Line), and is located 370.5 kilometers from the terminus of the line at Kameyama Station and 190.3 kilometers from Shingū.

== Station layout ==
The station consists of two elevated island platforms with the station building underneath. The station has a Midori no Madoguchi staffed ticket office.

=== Platforms ===
1,2	■ W Kisei Main Line (Kinokuni Line)	for Wakayama and Tennōji
3, 4	■ W Kisei Main Line (Kinokuni Line)	for Gobō and Shingū

== Adjacent stations ==
«	Service	»
West Japan Railway Company (JR West)
Kisei Main Line
Kii-Tanabe (One-way Operation)	West Express Ginga	Wakayama
Minoshima	Limited Express Kuroshio	Wakayama
Kamogō	Rapid	Kuroe
Shimizuura	Local	Kuroe

== History ==
Kainan Station opened on February 28, 1924 as Hikatamachi Station (日方町駅). It was renamed to its present name on July 1, 1936. With the privatization of the Japan National Railways (JNR) on April 1, 1987, the station came under the aegis of the West Japan Railway Company. The tracks were elevated and the station rebuilt in 1988.

== Passenger statistics ==
In fiscal 2019, the station was used by an average of 2802 passengers daily (boarding passengers only).

== Surrounding Area ==
- Kainan City Hall
- Japan Post Kainan Ono Post Office
- ainan Municipal Third Junior High School

== See also ==
- List of railway stations in Japan
