= Kainan =

Kainan 海南市
- City
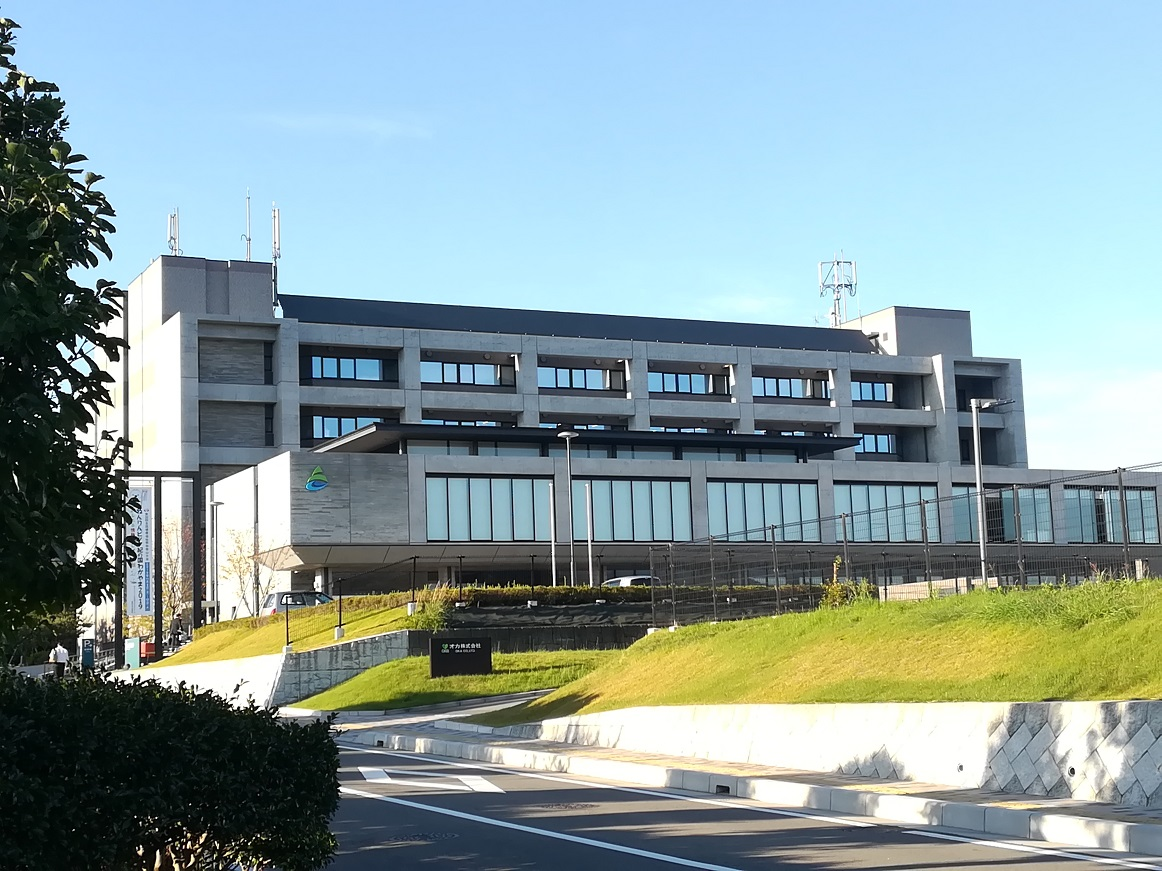
- Kainan City Hall

- Flag Emblem

- Location of Kainan in Wakayama Prefecture

- Location in Japan
- Coordinates: 34°9′N 135°13′E
- Country: Japan
- Region: Kansai
- Prefecture: Wakayama

Area
  - Total: 101.06 km^{2} (39.02 sq mi)

Population (October 31, 2021)
  - Total: 48,811
  - Density: 482.99/km^{2} (1,250.9/sq mi)
- Time zone: UTC+09:00 (JST)
- City hall address: 11 Minamiakasaka, Kainan-shi, Wakayama-ken642-8501
- Website: Official website
- Symbols
- Flower: Citrus unshiu
- Tree: Sakura

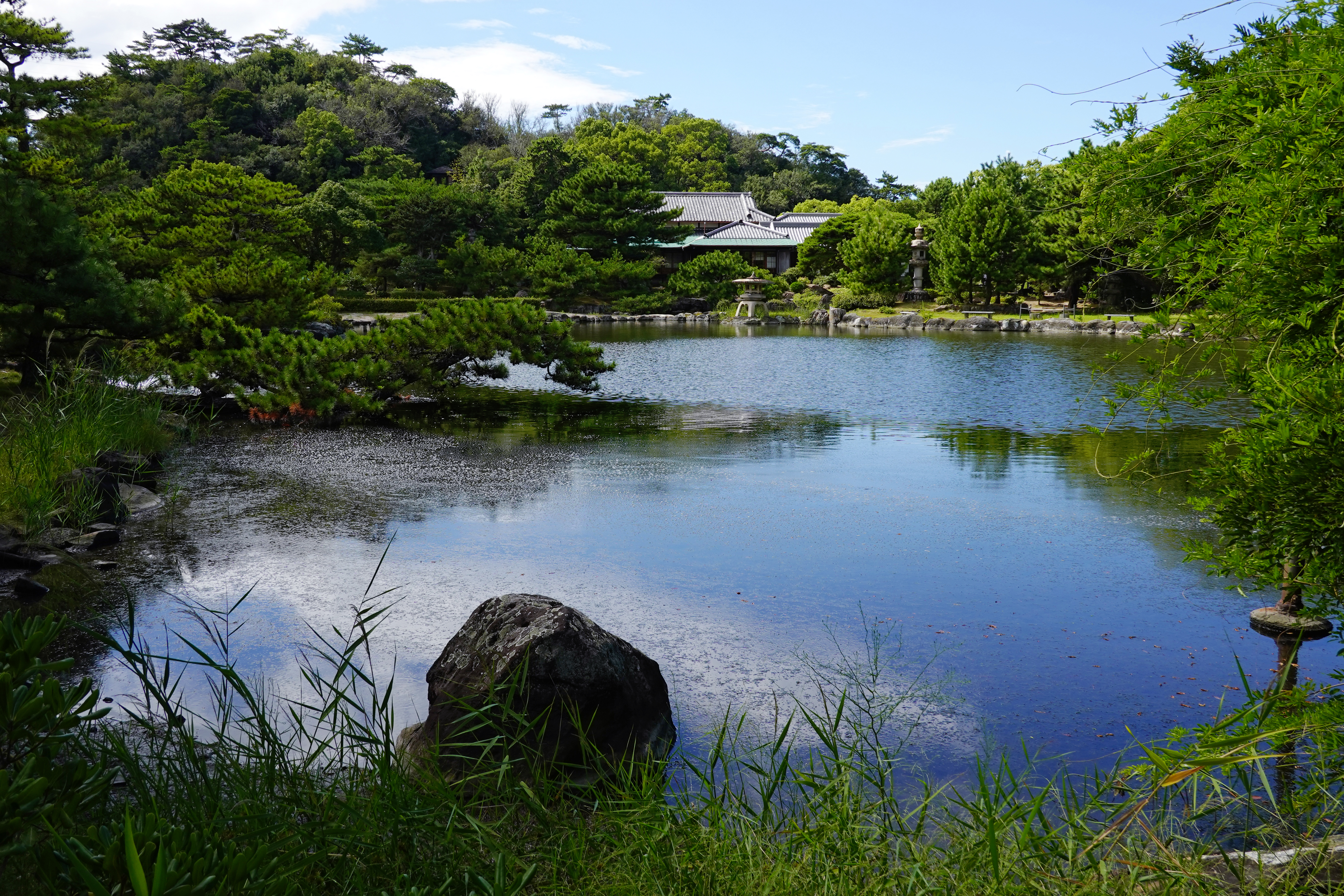
Kotonoura Onzan-Soh-En

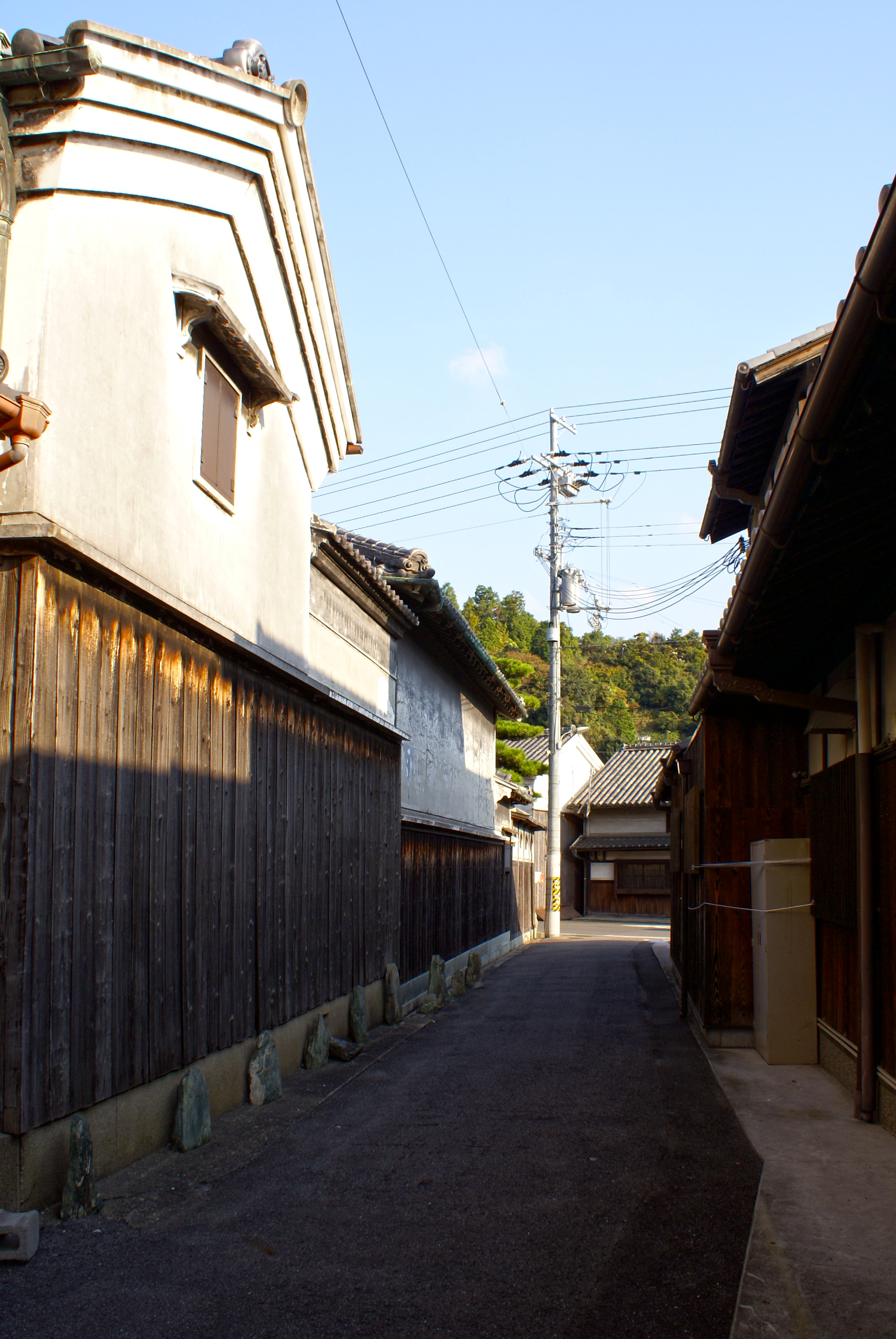
Street in Konoe neighborhood of Kainan

Kainan (海南市, Kainan-shi) is a city located in Wakayama Prefecture, Japan. As of 31 October 2021, the city had an estimated population of 48,811 in 22,129 households and a population density of 110 persons per km². The total area of the city is 101.06 square kilometres (39.02 sq mi)

== Geography ==
Kainan is located in northern Wakayama prefecture and facing the Kii Channel. The northern half of the city is hilly and relatively gentle, but the southern half is covered with mountains. The highest peak is Kagamiishiyama, with an elevation of 558 meters. The main rivers are the Kishi River, which runs through the eastern portion of the city and the Kameno River, which runs through the northern and central portion.

=== Neighboring municipalities ===
Wakayama Prefecture

- Arida
- Aridagawa
- Kimino
- Kinokawa
- Wakayama

== Climate ==
Kainan has a Humid subtropical climate (Köppen Cfa) characterized by warm summers and cool winters with light to no snowfall. The average annual temperature in Kainan is 15.6 °C. The average annual rainfall is 1713 mm with September as the wettest month. The temperatures are highest on average in August, at around 26.4 °C, and lowest in January, at around 5.4 °C. The area is subject to typhoons in summer.

== Demographics ==
Per Japanese census data, the population of Kainan has decreased steadily over the past 50 years.

Historical population
Year	Pop.	±%
1920	49,793	—
1930	58,451	+17.4%
1940	60,179	+3.0%
1950	71,639	+19.0%
1960	71,072	−0.8%
1970	71,200	+0.2%
1980	69,962	−1.7%
1990	63,390	−9.4%
2000	60,373	−4.8%
2010	54,790	−9.2%
2020	48,369	−11.7%

== History ==
The area of the modern city of Kainan was within ancient Kii Province, and Yayoi pottery and Kofun burial mounds indicate settlement since prehistoric times. The area is part of the Kumano Kodo and was a relay point between the capital and the onsen area of Shirahama since ancient times. During the Sengoku period, the area was a battleground between the forces of Oda Nobunaga and the local Saika ikki, one of many Ikkō-ikki movements. During the Edo period, the area prospered under the rule of Kishū Domain which gave protection to the Kuroe neighborhood as a center for the production of Kishū lacquerware. The village of Kuroe was founded with the creation of the modern municipalities system on April 1, 1889 and was raised to town status on July 7, 1896. Kuroe merged with the neighboring towns of Utsumi and Hikata and the village of Ono to form the city of Kainan on May 1, 1934. Kainan expanded by annexing the villages of Tatsumi, Kamekawa, Kitanokami, Nakanokami, and Minaminokami on April 1, 1955. On April 1, 2005, Kainan merged with the village of Shimotsu.

== Government ==
Kainan has a mayor-council form of government with a directly elected mayor and a unicameral city council of 20 members. Kainan, collectively with the other municipalities of Kaisō District contributes three members to the Wakayama Prefectural Assembly. In terms of national politics, the city is part of Wakayama 2nd district of the lower house of the Diet of Japan.

== Economy ==
Traditionally, Kainan was noted for crafts, such as Kishū lacquerware and umbrellas, and the production of sea salt. A seaside industrial park was constructed in the 1960s, which attracted heavy industry, including a steel pipe mill by Sumitomo Heavy Industries, an oil refinery by Koa Konan, and a thermal power plant by Kansai Electric. The eastern part of the city remains an agricultural area where fruits such as strawberries, peaches and citrus fruits are cultivated. The city is also known for its production of household sundry products, including items such as brushes, brooms, sponges and laundry hangers. The Mosquito coil was invented in Kainan, and many mosquito coil manufacturers have their headquarters and factories in the Shimotsu neighborhood of the city.

== Education ==
Kainan has 12 public elementary schools and seven public middle schools operated by the city government and two public high schools operated by the Wakayama Prefectural Department of Education.

== Transportation ==
=== Railway ===
JR West – Kisei Main Line

- Shimotsu - Kamogō - Shimizuura - Kainan - Kuroe

=== Highway ===
- Hanwa Expressway
- National Route 42
- National Route 370
- National Route 424

== Local attractions ==
- Chōhō-ji, contains the cemetery of the Kishū Tokugawa family, a National Historic Site
- Kotonoura Onzan-Soh-En (Japanese garden)
- Wakayama Prefectural Museum of Natural History

== Notable people from Kainan ==
- Masatoshi Ishida, politician
- Hiroo Onoda, Japanese World War II holdout
