= Kaisō District =

District in Wakayama Prefecture, Japan

Coordinates: 34.154°N 135.393°E

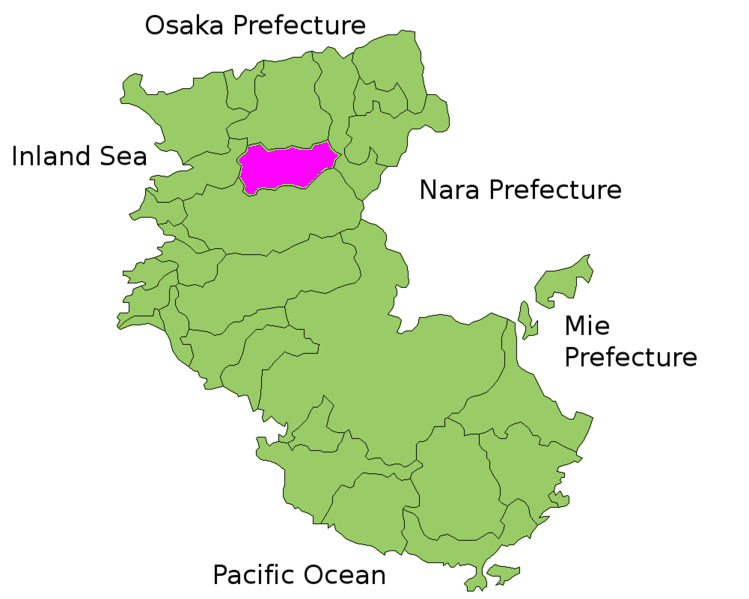
Location of Kaisō District in Wakayama Prefecture

Kaisō (海草郡, Kaisō-gun) is a district located in Wakayama Prefecture, Japan.

As of September 1, 2008, the district has an estimated population of 10,988 and a density of 85.6 inhabitants per square kilometre (222/sq mi). The total area is 128.31 square kilometres (49.54 sq mi).

== Towns and villages ==
- Kimino

== Mergers ==
- On April 1, 2005 the town of Shimotsu merged into the city of Kainan.
- On January 1, 2006 the towns of Misato and Nokami merged to form the new town of Kimino.
