= Ōtōsan Prefectural Natural Park =

Natural park of Wakayama prefecture, Japan

Coordinates: 33°43′37″N 135°42′50″E

- 大塔山県立自然公園
- Interactive map of Ōtōsan Prefectural Natural Park
- Location: Wakayama Prefecture, Japan
- Nearest city: Shingū, Tanabe
- Area: 99.68 square kilometres (38.49 sq mi)
- Established: 7 May 2020

Ōtōsan Prefectural Natural Park (大塔山県立自然公園, Ōtōsan kenritsu shizen kōen) is a Prefectural Natural Park in Wakayama Prefecture, Japan. Established in 2020, the park spans the borders of the municipalities of Kozagawa, Shingū, and Tanabe. The park's central feature is the eponymous Mount Ōtō (大塔山).

== See also ==
- National Parks of Japan
- List of Places of Scenic Beauty of Japan (Wakayama)
