= Kozagawa Prefectural Natural Park =

Natural park of Wakayama prefecture, Japan

Coordinates: 33°32′50″N 135°43′14″E

- 古座川県立自然公園
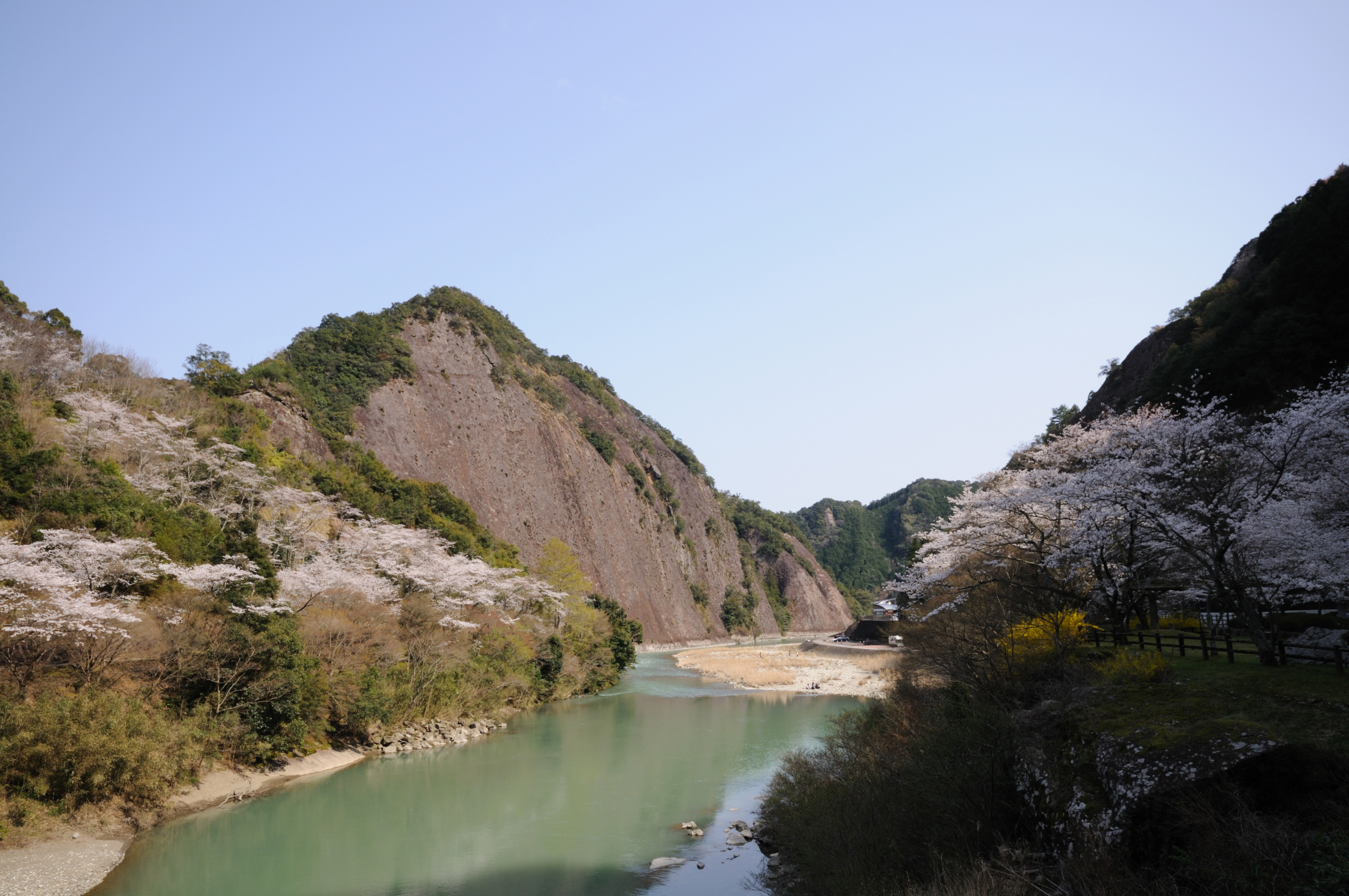
- Koza River
- Interactive map of Kozagawa Prefectural Natural Park
- Location: Wakayama Prefecture, Japan
- Nearest town: Kozagawa, Shirahama, Susami
- Area: 61.06 square kilometres (23.58 sq mi)
- Established: 30 March 2010

Kozagawa Prefectural Natural Park (古座川県立自然公園, Kozagawa kenritsu shizen kōen) is a Prefectural Natural Park in Wakayama Prefecture, Japan. Established in 2010, the park spans the borders of the municipalities of Kozagawa, Shirahama, and Susami. The park's central feature is the eponymous Koza River (古座川).

== See also ==
- National Parks of Japan
- List of Places of Scenic Beauty of Japan (Wakayama)
