= Jōgamori Hokodai Prefectural Natural Park =

Natural park of Wakayama prefecture, Japan

Coordinates: 34°02′10″N 135°30′29″E

- 城ヶ森鉾尖県立自然公園
- Interactive map of Jōgamori Hokodai Prefectural Natural Park
- Location: Wakayama Prefecture, Japan
- Nearest city: Tanabe
- Area: 42.25 square kilometres (16.31 sq mi)
- Established: 28 April 2009

Jōgamori Hokodai Prefectural Natural Park (城ヶ森鉾尖県立自然公園, Jōgamori Hokodai kenritsu shizen kōen) is a Prefectural Natural Park in Wakayama Prefecture, Japan. Established in 2009, the park spans the borders of the municipalities of Aridagawa, Hidakagawa, and Tanabe. The park's central features are the eponymous Mount Jōgamori (城ヶ森山) and Mount Hokodai (鉾尖岳).

== See also ==
- National Parks of Japan
- List of Places of Scenic Beauty of Japan (Wakayama)
