= Nishiarida Prefectural Natural Park =

Natural park of Wakayama prefecture, Japan

Coordinates: 34°04′25″N 135°04′44″E

- 西有田県立自然公園
- Interactive map of Nishiarida Prefectural Natural Park
- Location: Wakayama Prefecture, Japan
- Nearest city: Arida
- Area: 2.18 square kilometres (0.84 sq mi)
- Established: 1 November 1956

Nishiarida Prefectural Natural Park (西有田県立自然公園, Nishiarida kenritsu shizen kōen) is a Prefectural Natural Park in Wakayama Prefecture, Japan. Established in 1956, the park spans the borders of the municipalities of Arida, Hirogawa, and Yuasa. The park comprises the stretch of ria coast between Miyazaki-no-Hana (宮崎ノ鼻) in Arida and Karao Bay (唐尾湾) in Hirogawa, as well as the islands of Karumo-jima (苅藻島), Kenashi-jima (毛無島), and Takashima (鷹島).

== See also ==
- National Parks of Japan
- List of Places of Scenic Beauty of Japan (Wakayama)
