= Miyama, Wakayama =

Dissolved municipality in Wakayama prefecture, Japan

Miyama (美山村, Miyama-mura) was a village located in Hidaka District, Wakayama Prefecture, Japan.

As of 2003, the village had an estimated population of 2,107 and a density of 12.50 persons per km^{2}. The total area was 168.62 km^{2}.

On May 1, 2005, Miyama, along with the town of Kawabe, and the village of Nakatsu (all from Hidaka District), was merged to create the town of Hidakagawa.

Despite this merger, many local people still identify with the village name, continue their local traditions, and teach village history in the school system. There are three distinct hamlets in Miyama village pocketed along the Hidaka River. These include Kawaharagou, Kasamatsu, and Sougawa; each hamlet has an elementary school, with Kawaharagou home to the village's only Junior High School. Miyama is home to many small, locally run shops, a large dam, and a park called "Yahoo point," famous for its mountain echo; tourists and families shout from the mountain and over the river to produce the echo.

On November 3, the Sougawa Matsuri is held at Sougawa Shrine, which was built by the Sougawa Chogen in 1204. It is an ancient festival where the Maishishi of Shingaku, or lion dance, takes place.
