= Shiramisan-Wadagawakyō Prefectural Natural Park =

Natural park of Wakayama prefecture, Japan

Coordinates: 33°45′29″N 135°53′00″E

- 白見山和田川峡県立自然公園
- Interactive map of Shiramisan-Wadagawakyō Prefectural Natural Park
- Location: Wakayama Prefecture, Japan
- Nearest city: Shingū
- Area: 29.16 square kilometres (11.26 sq mi)
- Established: 28 April 2009

Shiramisan-Wadagawakyō Prefectural Natural Park (白見山和田川峡県立自然公園, Shiramisan-Wadagawakyō kenritsu shizen kōen) is a Prefectural Natural Park in Wakayama Prefecture, Japan. Established in 2009, the park is wholly located within the city of Shingū. The park's central features are the eponymous Mount Shirami (白見山) and Wada River Gorge (和田川峡).

== See also ==
- National Parks of Japan
- List of Places of Scenic Beauty of Japan (Wakayama)
