= Engetsu Island =

Island off the coast of Shirahama, Wakayama

Engetsu-tō
Native name: 円月島
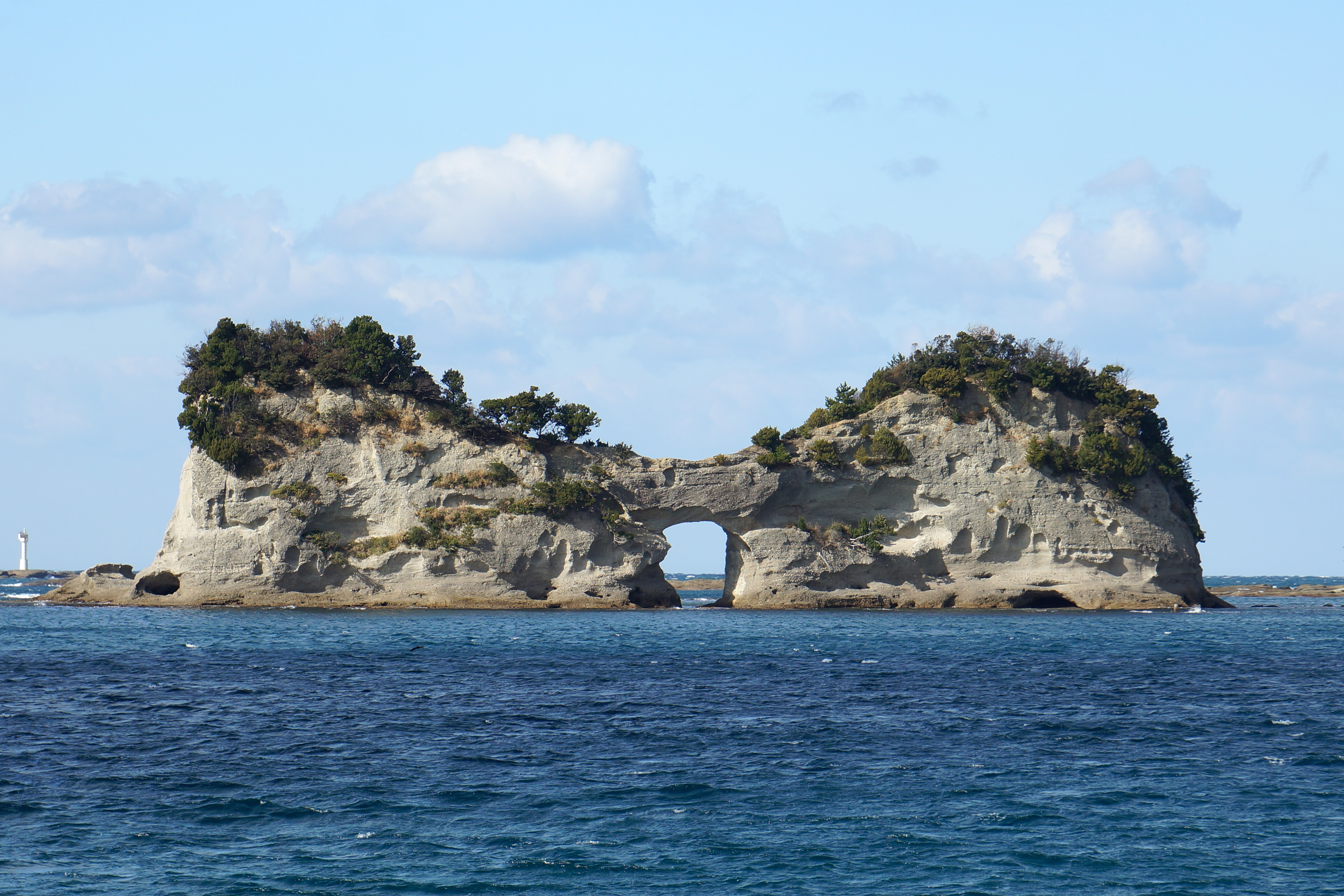
- Engetsu-tō

- Location within Wakayama Prefecture Location within Japan

Geography
- Location: Pacific Ocean (Rinkai Bay)
- Coordinates: 33°41′24″N 135°20′11″E
- Area: 23.87 km^{2} (9.22 sq mi)
- Length: 130 m (430 ft)
- Width: 35 m (115 ft)
- Highest elevation: 25 m (82 ft)

Administration
- Japan
- Prefecture: Wakayama
- Town: Shirahama, Wakayama

Engetsu Island (円月島, Engetsu-tō) is the common name for Takashima (高嶋), a small uninhabited islet off the coast of Shirahama, Wakayama Prefecture, Japan. It is noted for having a natural arch created through the effects of erosion by wind and waves, and has been designated a National Place of Scenic Beauty.

One of the symbols of the Shirahama area, the islet measures approximately 130 metres (430 ft) north-to-south and 35 metres (115 ft) east-to-west, and has a maximum elevation of 25 metres (82 ft). The circular moon-shaped hole (sea cave) in the center of the island has a diameter of nine meters and is the origin of the popular name "Engetsu" (full moon). During the spring and autumn equinoxes, the sunset can be seen through the hole in the center.

Compared to the nearby Shirarahama Beach, water transparency is much higher near the islet, and many fish species can be seen. The island is largely formed of sandstone and has become less stable over time. Since July 2009, the Shirahama town government has cautioned against approaching the island because of the risk of collapse of the arch.

== See also ==
- List of Places of Scenic Beauty of Japan (Wakayama)
