= Kōyasanchō Ishimichi-Tamagawakyō Prefectural Natural Park =

Natural park in Wakayama, Japan

Coordinates: 34°17′30″N 135°28′08″E

- 高野山町石道玉川峡県立自然公園
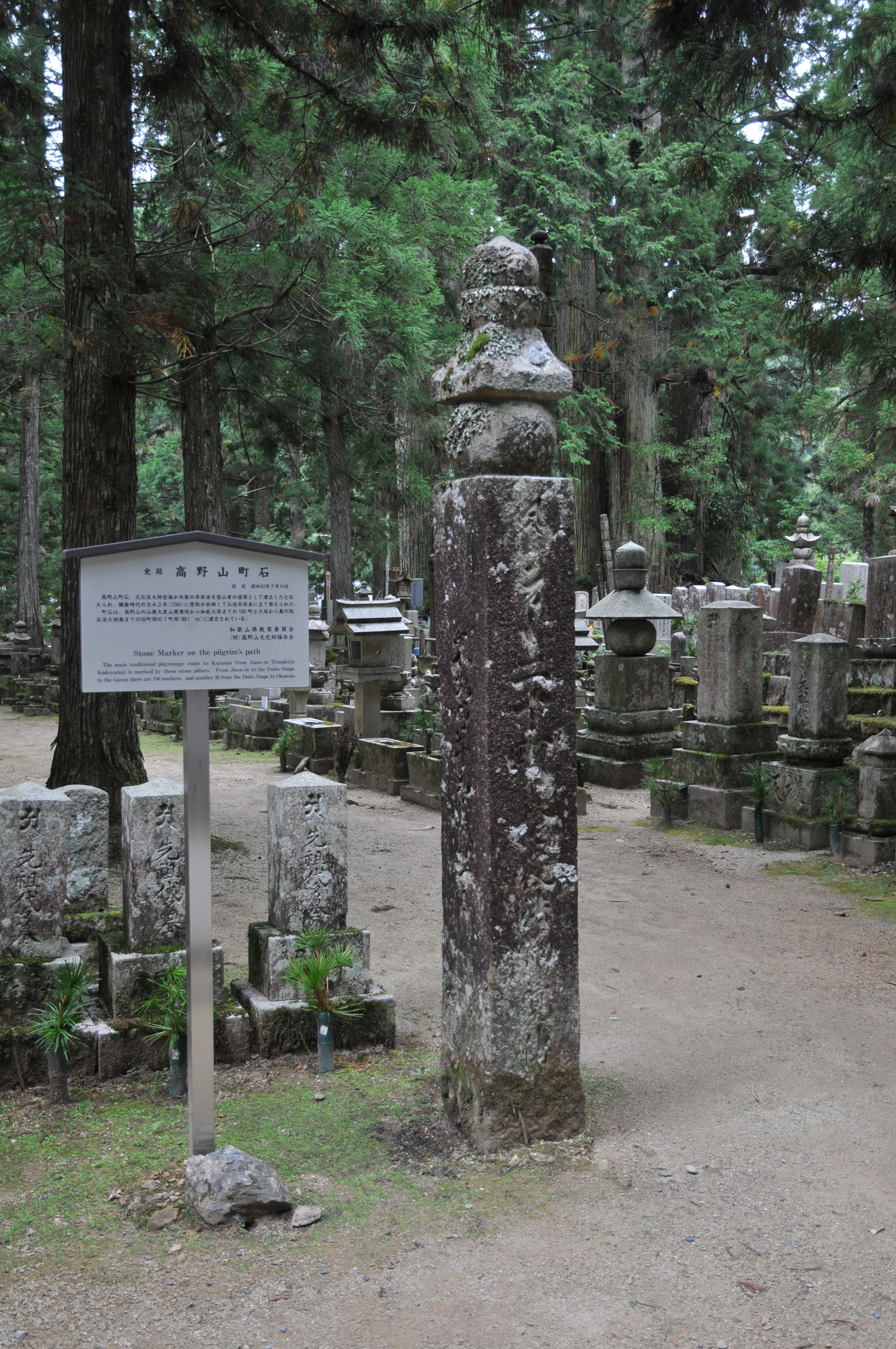
- Kōyasan chōishi-michi
- Interactive map of Kōyasanchō Ishimichi-Tamagawakyō Prefectural Natural Park
- Location: Wakayama Prefecture, Japan
- Nearest city: Hashimoto, Katsuragi, Kōya, Kudoyama
- Area: 6.45 square kilometres (2.49 sq mi)
- Established: 6 January 1968

Kōyasanchō Ishimichi-Tamagawakyō Prefectural Natural Park (高野山町石道玉川峡県立自然公園, Kōyasan-chō Ishimichi Tamagawa-kyō kenritsu shizen kōen) is a Prefectural Natural Park in Wakayama Prefecture, Japan. Established in 1968, the park spans the borders of the municipalities of Hashimoto, Katsuragi, Kōya, and Kudoyama. The park comprises three non-contiguous areas, centred in turn upon Horaisan Jinja (宝来山神社) and the eponymous Kōyasan chōishi-michi and Tamagawa-kyō (玉川峡).

== See also ==
- National Parks of Japan
- Sacred Sites and Pilgrimage Routes in the Kii Mountain Range
- List of Historic Sites of Japan (Wakayama)
- List of Places of Scenic Beauty of Japan (Wakayama)
