= Kawabe, Wakayama =

Dissolved municipality in Wakayama prefecture, Japan

Coordinates: 33°54′42″N 135°11′10″E

Kawabe (川辺町, Kawabe-chō) was a town located in Hidaka District, Wakayama Prefecture, Japan.

As of 2003, the town had an estimated population of 6,896 and a density of 90.77 persons per km^{2}. The total area was 75.97 km^{2}.

On May 1, 2005, Kawabe, along with the villages of Miyama and Nakatsu (all from Hidaka District), was merged to create the town of Hidakagawa.
