= Ryūmonzan Prefectural Natural Park =

Prefectural natural park in Japan

Coordinates: 34°17′30″N 135°28′08″E

- 龍門山県立自然公園
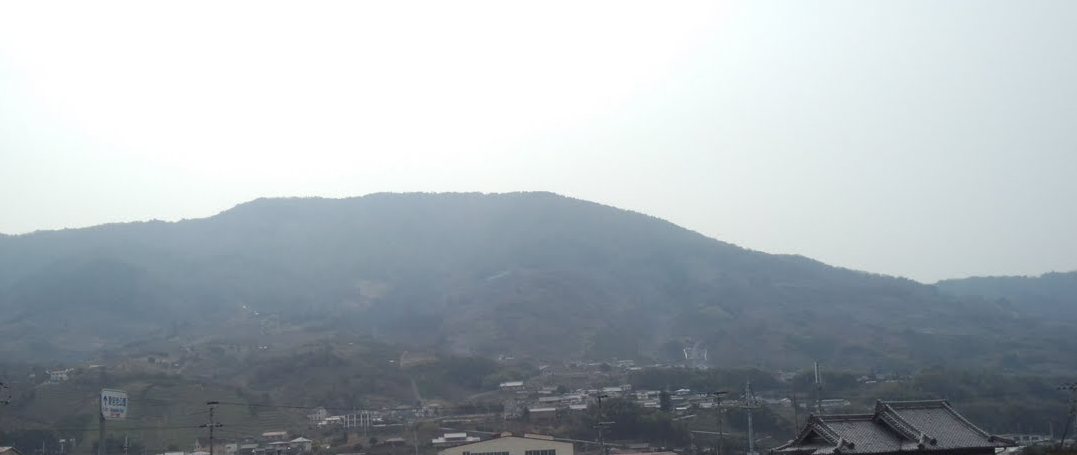
- Mount Ryūmon (756 metres (2,480 ft))
- Interactive map of Ryūmonzan Prefectural Natural Park
- Location: Wakayama Prefecture, Japan
- Nearest city: Kinokawa
- Area: 1.26 square kilometres (0.49 sq mi)
- Established: 19 April 1958

Ryūmonzan Prefectural Natural Park (龍門山県立自然公園, Ryūmonzan kenritsu shizen kōen) is a Prefectural Natural Park in Wakayama Prefecture, Japan. Established in 1958, the park is wholly located within the city of Kinokawa. The park's central feature is the eponymous Mount Ryūmon (龍門山).

== See also ==
- National Parks of Japan
- List of Places of Scenic Beauty of Japan (Wakayama)
