= Nakatsu, Wakayama =

Dissolved municipality in Wakayama prefecture, Japan

Nakatsu (中津村, Nakatsu-mura) was a village located in Hidaka District, Wakayama Prefecture, Japan.

As of 2003, the village had an estimated population of 2,499 and a density of 28.72 persons per km^{2}. The total area was 87.02 km^{2}.

On May 1, 2005, Nakatsu, along with the town of Kawabe, and the village of Miyama (all from Hidaka District), was merged to create the town of Hidakagawa.
