= Enju Kaigan Prefectural Natural Park =

Natural park in Japan

Coordinates: 33°53′32″N 135°07′18″E

- 煙樹海岸県立自然公園
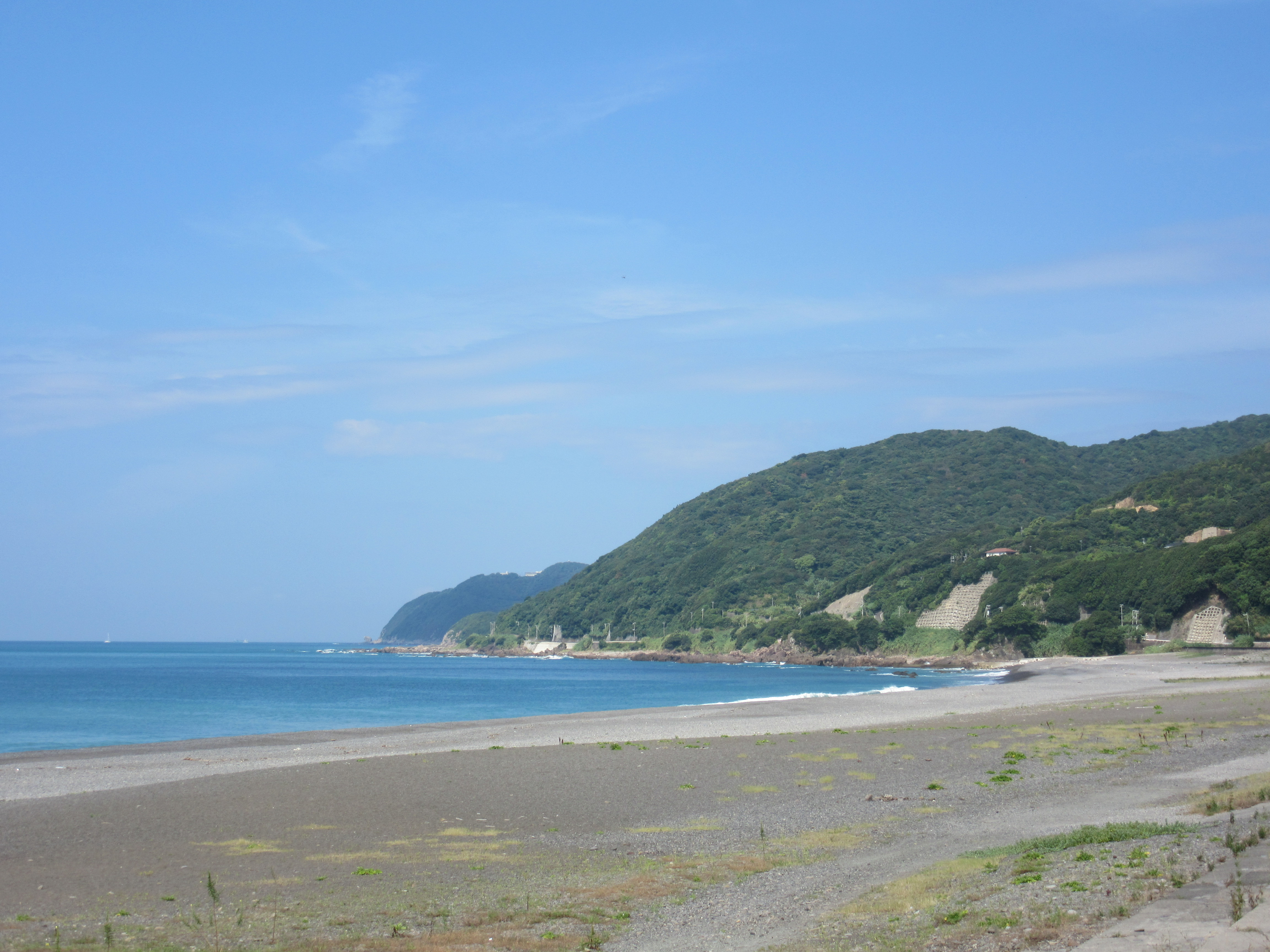
- Enjugahama
- Interactive map of Enju Kaigan Prefectural Natural Park
- Location: Wakayama Prefecture, Japan
- Nearest city: Gobō
- Area: 10.09 square kilometres (3.90 sq mi)
- Established: 6 July 1954

Enju Kaigan Prefectural Natural Park (煙樹海岸県立自然公園, Enju Kaigan kenritsu shizen kōen) is a Prefectural Natural Park in Wakayama Prefecture, Japan. Established in 1954, the park spans the borders of the municipalities of Gobō, Hidaka, and Mihama. The park's central feature is the eponymous Enjugahama Coast (煙樹ヶ浜).

== See also ==
- National Parks of Japan
- List of Places of Scenic Beauty of Japan (Wakayama)
