= Hatenashi Sanmyaku Prefectural Natural Park =

Natural park in Wakayama prefecture, Japan

Coordinates: 33°53′52″N 135°41′16″E

- 果無山脈県立自然公園
- Interactive map of Hatenashi Sanmyaku Prefectural Natural Park
- Location: Wakayama Prefecture, Japan
- Nearest city: Tanabe
- Area: 6.04 square kilometres (2.33 sq mi)
- Established: 28 April 2009

Hatenashi Sanmyaku Prefectural Natural Park (果無山脈県立自然公園, Hatenashi Sanmyaku kenritsu shizen kōen) is a Prefectural Natural Park in Wakayama Prefecture, Japan. Established in 2009, the park is wholly located within the city of Tanabe. The park's central feature is the eponymous "Endless Mountain Range" of Hatenashi Sanmyaku (果無山脈).

== See also ==
- National Parks of Japan
- List of Places of Scenic Beauty of Japan (Wakayama)
