= Hikigawa Prefectural Natural Park =

Natural park of Wakayama prefecture, Japan

Coordinates: 33°38′42″N 135°30′19″E

- 日置川県立自然公園
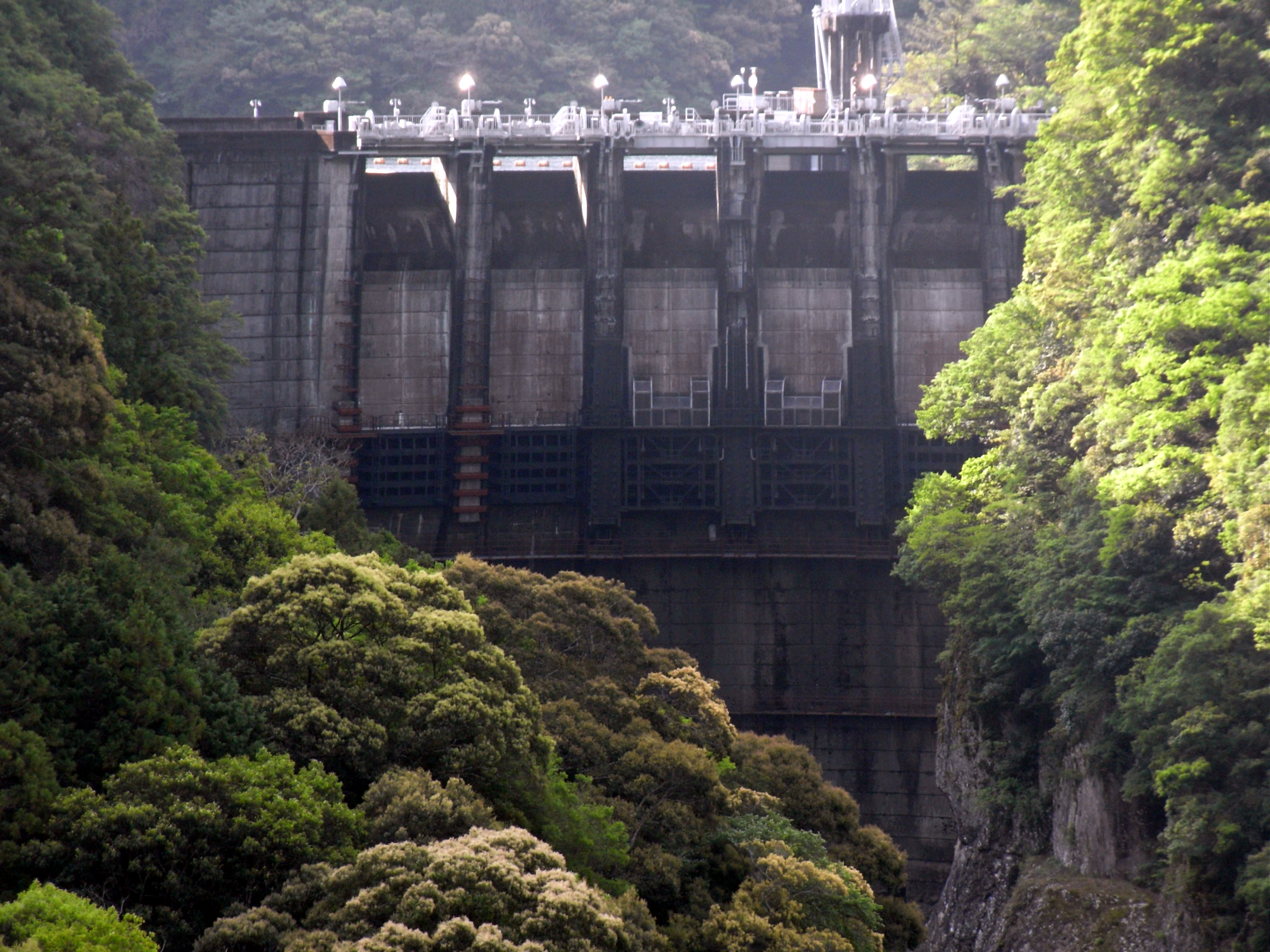
- Tonoyama Dam
- Interactive map of Hikigawa Prefectural Natural Park
- Location: Wakayama Prefecture, Japan
- Nearest city: Tanabe
- Area: 33.79 square kilometres (13.05 sq mi)
- Established: 30 June 1971

Hikigawa Prefectural Natural Park (日置川県立自然公園, Hikigawa kenritsu shizen kōen) is a Prefectural Natural Park in Wakayama Prefecture, Japan. Established in 1971, the park spans the borders of the municipalities of Shirahama and Tanabe. The park's central feature is the eponymous Hiki River (日置川).

== See also ==
- National Parks of Japan
- List of Places of Scenic Beauty of Japan (Wakayama)
