= Oishi Kōgen Prefectural Natural Park =

Natural park of Wakayama prefecture, Japan

Coordinates: 34°06′56″N 135°19′22″E

- 生石高原県立自然公園
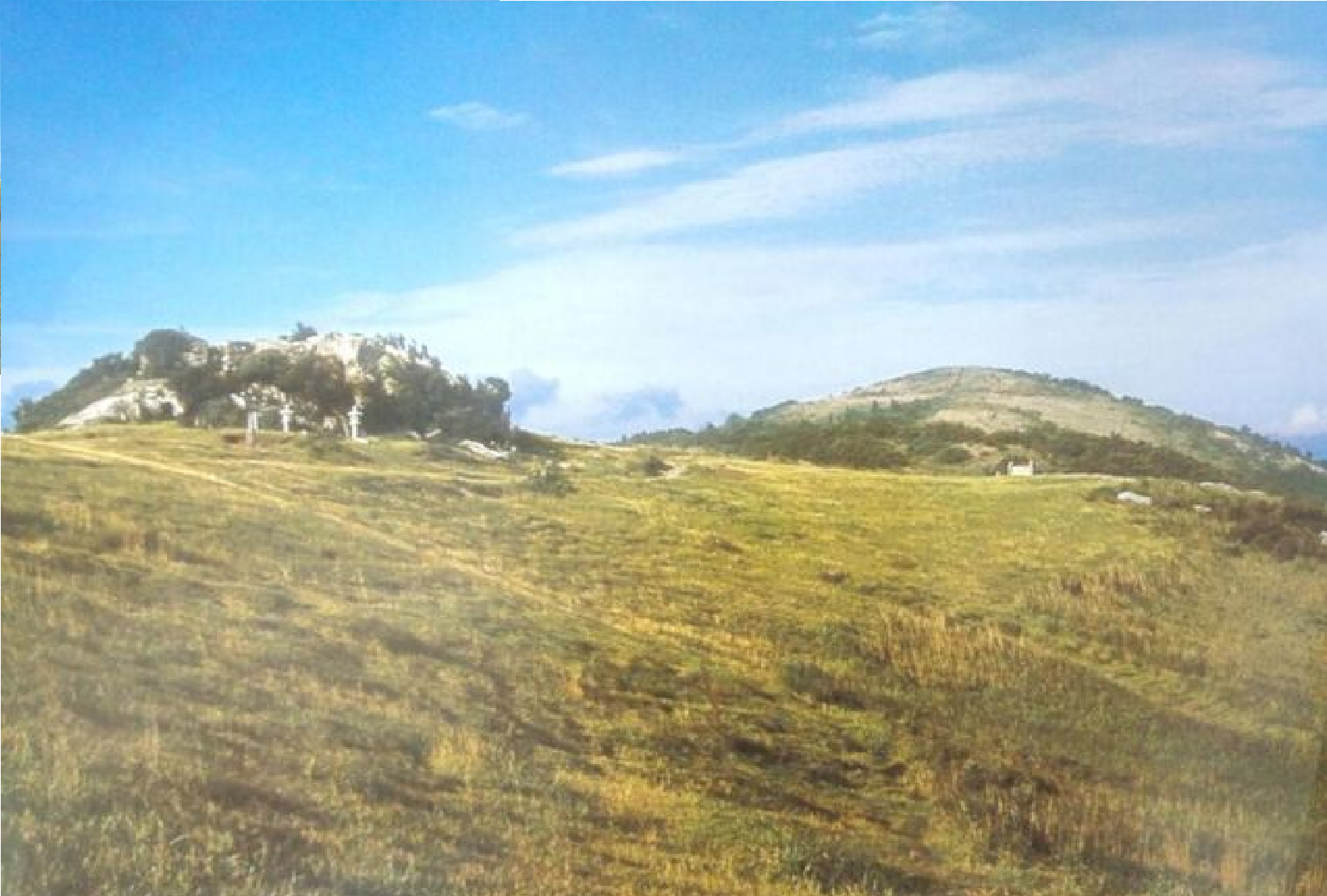
- Oishi Plateau
- Interactive map of Oishi Kōgen Prefectural Natural Park
- Location: Wakayama Prefecture, Japan
- Nearest town: Aridagawa, Kimino
- Area: 4.26 square kilometres (1.64 sq mi)
- Established: 5 February 1955

Oishi Kōgen Prefectural Natural Park (生石高原県立自然公園, Oishi Kōgen kenritsu shizen kōen) is a Prefectural Natural Park in Wakayama Prefecture, Japan. Established in 1955, the park spans the borders of the municipalities of Aridagawa and Kimino. The park's central feature is the eponymous Oishi Plateau (生石高原).

== See also ==
- National Parks of Japan
- List of Places of Scenic Beauty of Japan (Wakayama)
