= Shirasaki Kaigan Prefectural Natural Park =

Natural park of Wakayama prefecture, Japan

Coordinates: 33°58′37″N 135°04′20″E

- 白崎海岸県立自然公園
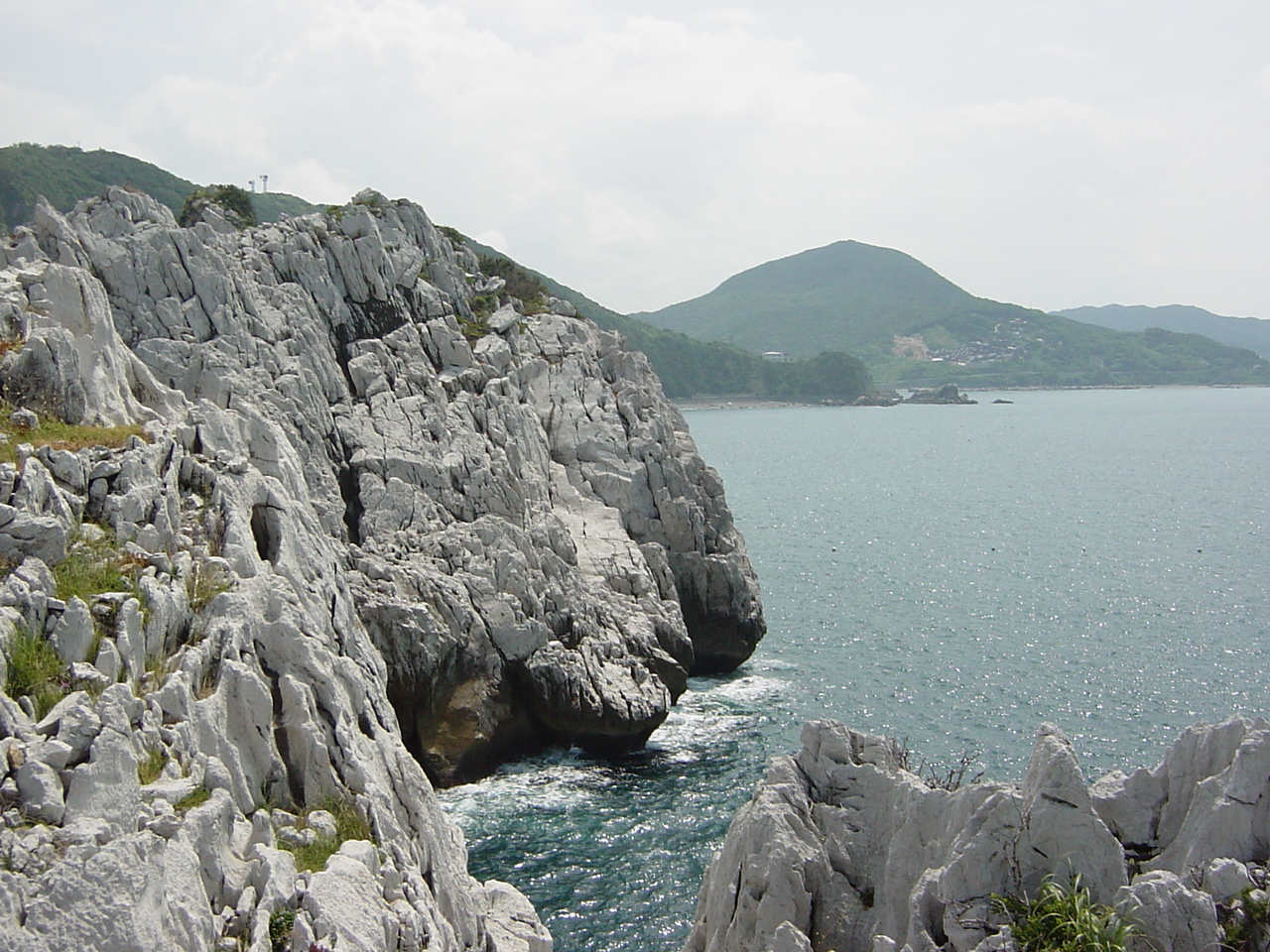
- Shirasaki Coast
- Interactive map of Shirasaki Kaigan Prefectural Natural Park
- Location: Wakayama Prefecture, Japan
- Nearest town: Yura
- Area: 2.20 square kilometres (0.85 sq mi)
- Established: 10 July 1958

Shirasaki Kaigan Prefectural Natural Park (白崎海岸県立自然公園, Shirasaki Kaigan kenritsu shizen kōen) is a Prefectural Natural Park in Wakayama Prefecture, Japan. Established in 1958, the park is wholly located within the town of Yura. The park's central feature is the eponymous Shirasaki Coast (白崎海岸).

== See also ==
- National Parks of Japan
- List of Places of Scenic Beauty of Japan (Wakayama)
