= Hidaka District, Wakayama =

District in Wakayama prefecture, Japan

Coordinates: 33.897°N 135.336°E

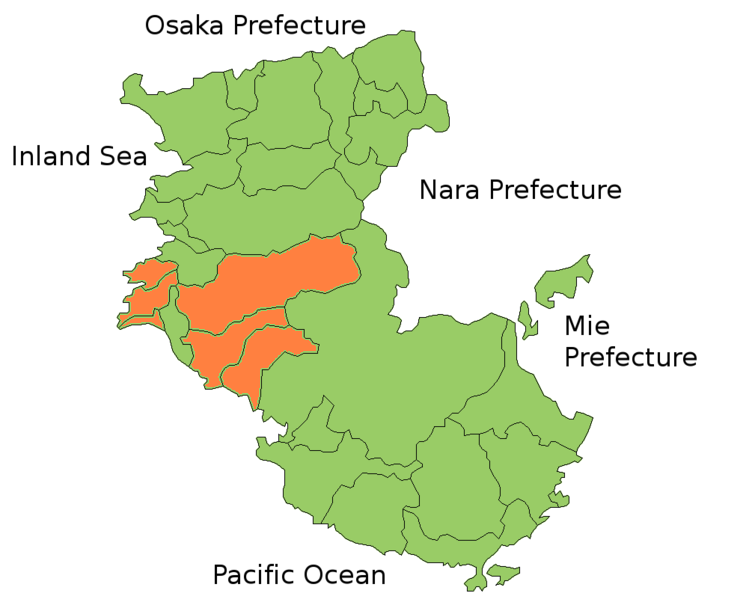
Location of Hidaka District in Wakayama Prefecture

Hidaka District (日高郡, Hidaka-gun) is a district located in Wakayama Prefecture, Japan.

As of 2020, the district has an estimated Population of 48,661 and a Density of 74.25 persons/km^{2}. Hidaka's total area is 655.49 km^{2}.

== Towns and villages ==
- Hidaka
- Hidakagawa
- Inami
- Mihama
- Minabe
- Yura

== Merger ==
- On October 1, 2004, the village of Minabegawa merged into the expanded town of Minabe.
- On May 1, 2005, the towns of Kawabe, Nakatsu and Miyama merged to form the new town of Hidakagawa.
- On May 1, 2005, the village of Ryūjin merged into the city of Tanabe.
