= Hidakagawa =

Hidakagawa 日高川町
- Town
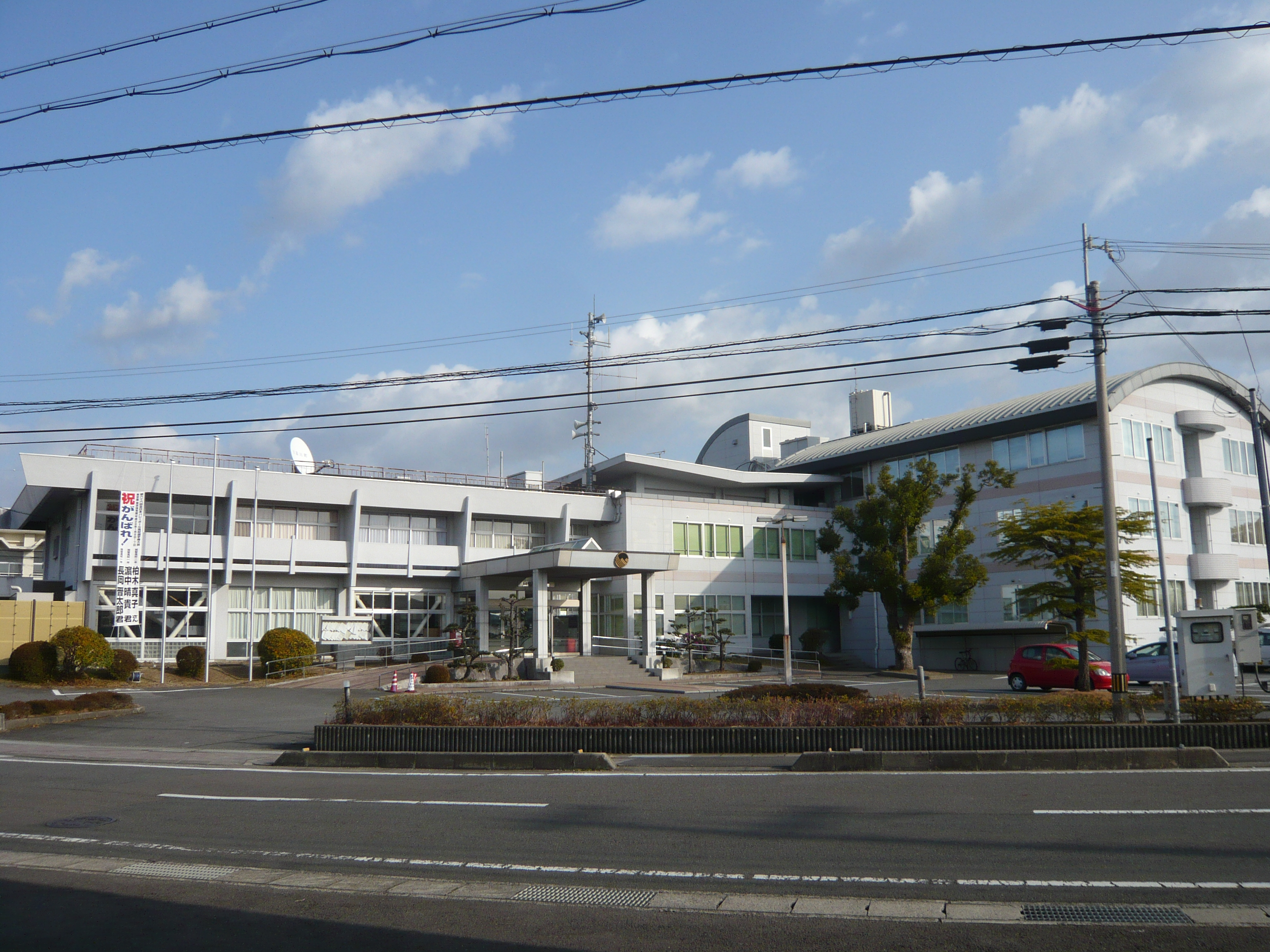
- Hidakagawa town hall

- Flag Emblem

- Location of Hidakagawa in Wakayama Prefecture

- Location in Japan
- Coordinates: 33°55′N 135°11′E
- Country: Japan
- Region: Kansai
- Prefecture: Wakayama
- District: Hidaka

Area
  - Total: 331.59 km^{2} (128.03 sq mi)

Population (October 31, 2021)
  - Total: 9,556
  - Density: 28.82/km^{2} (74.64/sq mi)
- Time zone: UTC+09:00 (JST)
- City hall address: 160 Habu, Hidakagawa-cho, Hidaka-gun, Wakayama-ken 649-1324
- Climate: Cfa
- Website: Official website
- Symbols
- Bird: Japanese bush warbler
- Flower: Wisteria
- Tree: Quercus phillyraeoides

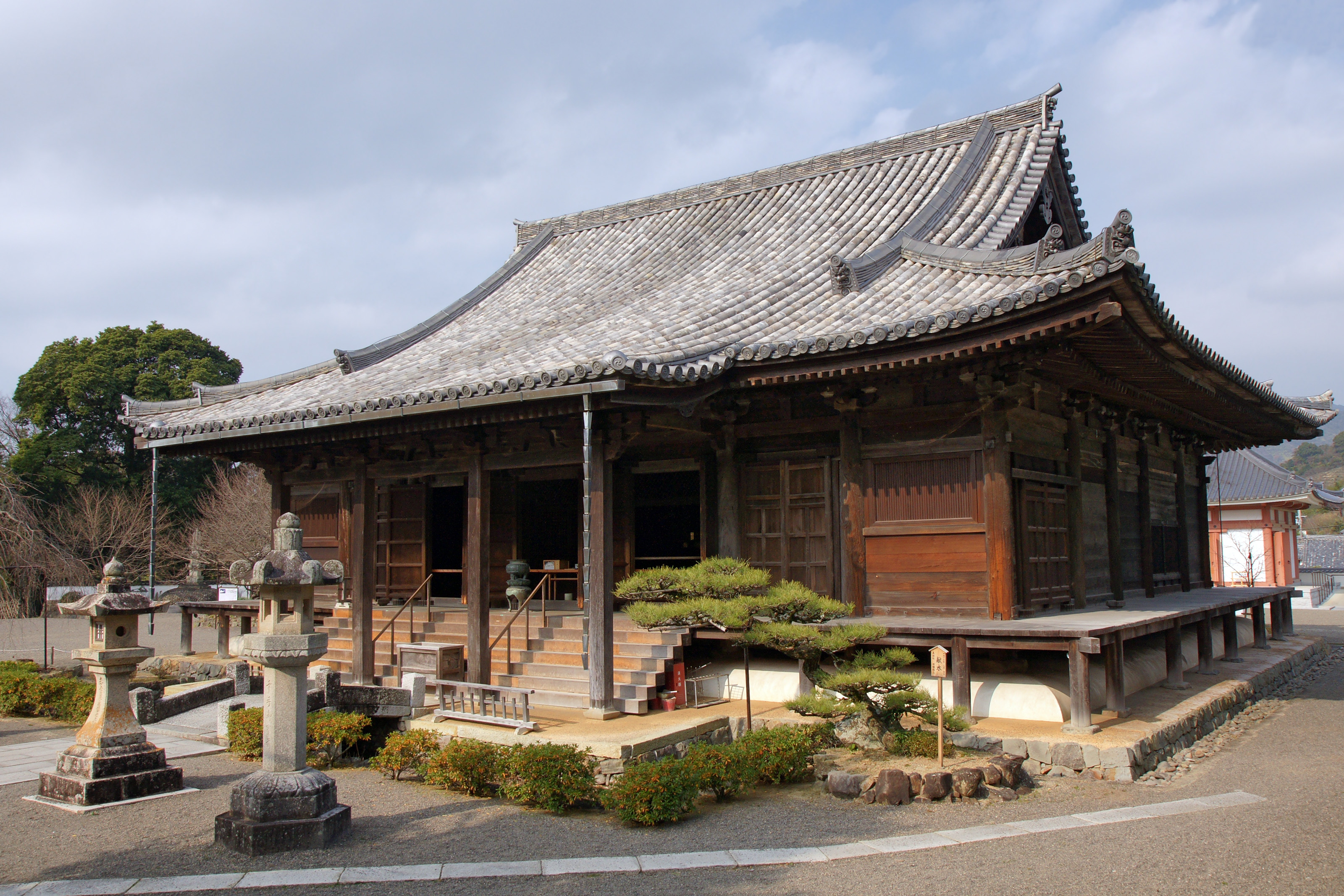
Dōjō-ji

Hidakagawa (日高川町, Hidakagawa-chō) is a town in Hidaka District, Wakayama Prefecture, Japan. As of 31 October 2021, the town had an estimated population of 9,556 in 4246 households and a population density of 29 persons per km^{2}. The total area of the town is 331.59 square kilometres (128.03 sq mi).

== Geography ==
Hidakagawa is located in central Wakayama Prefecture. It is about 35 km east–west and about 10 km north–south. The Hidaka River runs through the central part, and about 90% of the total area is forest. It occupies about 7% of the total area of Wakayama Prefecture and is the third largest municipality in terms of area in the prefecture.

=== Neighboring municipalities ===
Wakayama Prefecture

- Aridagawa
- Gobō
- Hidaka
- Hirogawa
- Inami
- Tanabe

=== Climate ===
Hidakagawa has a humid subtropical climate (Köppen Cfa) characterized by warm summers and cool winters with light to no snowfall. The average annual temperature in Hidakagawa is 16.1 °C (61.0 °F). The average annual rainfall is 1,961.0 mm (77.20 in) with September as the wettest month. The temperatures are highest on average in August, at around 26.8 °C (80.2 °F), and lowest in January, at around 6.0 °C (42.8 °F). The area is subject to typhoons in summer.

Climate data for Kawabe, Hidakagawa (1999−2020 normals, extremes 1999−present)
| Month | Jan | Feb | Mar | Apr | May | Jun | Jul | Aug | Sep | Oct | Nov | Dec | Year |
|---|---|---|---|---|---|---|---|---|---|---|---|---|---|
| Record high °C (°F) | 18.9 (66.0) | 22.3 (72.1) | 24.2 (75.6) | 28.8 (83.8) | 31.0 (87.8) | 33.3 (91.9) | 37.5 (99.5) | 38.4 (101.1) | 35.2 (95.4) | 31.9 (89.4) | 26.4 (79.5) | 22.6 (72.7) | 38.4 (101.1) |
| Mean daily maximum °C (°F) | 9.9 (49.8) | 11.2 (52.2) | 14.7 (58.5) | 19.8 (67.6) | 24.2 (75.6) | 26.6 (79.9) | 30.2 (86.4) | 31.9 (89.4) | 28.7 (83.7) | 23.4 (74.1) | 17.9 (64.2) | 12.4 (54.3) | 20.9 (69.6) |
| Daily mean °C (°F) | 6.0 (42.8) | 6.6 (43.9) | 9.5 (49.1) | 14.3 (57.7) | 18.7 (65.7) | 22.0 (71.6) | 25.7 (78.3) | 26.8 (80.2) | 23.7 (74.7) | 18.6 (65.5) | 13.3 (55.9) | 8.2 (46.8) | 16.1 (61.0) |
| Mean daily minimum °C (°F) | 2.2 (36.0) | 2.4 (36.3) | 4.7 (40.5) | 9.2 (48.6) | 13.9 (57.0) | 18.3 (64.9) | 22.4 (72.3) | 23.1 (73.6) | 20.0 (68.0) | 14.6 (58.3) | 9.2 (48.6) | 4.3 (39.7) | 12.0 (53.7) |
| Record low °C (°F) | −4.1 (24.6) | −4.3 (24.3) | −2.6 (27.3) | 0.5 (32.9) | 3.8 (38.8) | 11.0 (51.8) | 16.7 (62.1) | 16.7 (62.1) | 11.0 (51.8) | 7.0 (44.6) | 0.8 (33.4) | −1.9 (28.6) | −4.3 (24.3) |
| Average precipitation mm (inches) | 68.3 (2.69) | 87.8 (3.46) | 130.7 (5.15) | 141.5 (5.57) | 167.8 (6.61) | 255.4 (10.06) | 261.8 (10.31) | 186.3 (7.33) | 267.3 (10.52) | 199.1 (7.84) | 114.2 (4.50) | 72.6 (2.86) | 1,961 (77.20) |
| Average precipitation days (≥ 1.0 mm) | 6.7 | 7.8 | 10.0 | 9.4 | 9.2 | 12.7 | 10.8 | 9.0 | 10.6 | 9.8 | 7.9 | 6.9 | 110.8 |
| Mean monthly sunshine hours | 149.3 | 154.1 | 188.5 | 197.4 | 201.9 | 136.3 | 173.4 | 224.0 | 168.5 | 174.2 | 159.1 | 150.7 | 2,081.2 |
Source: Japan Meteorological Agency

== Demographics ==
Per Japanese census data, the population of Hidakagawa has been decreasing over the past 60 years.

Historical population
| Year | Pop. | ±% |
|---|---|---|
| 1920 | 16,007 | — |
| 1930 | 16,105 | +0.6% |
| 1940 | 16,609 | +3.1% |
| 1950 | 19,231 | +15.8% |
| 1960 | 17,878 | −7.0% |
| 1970 | 13,601 | −23.9% |
| 1980 | 12,274 | −9.8% |
| 1990 | 11,746 | −4.3% |
| 2000 | 11,607 | −1.2% |
| 2010 | 10,517 | −9.4% |

== History ==
The area of the modern town of Hidakagawa was within ancient Kii Province, and was the location of Tedori Castle during the Sengoku period. The villages of Hayaso, Nyu and Yata were established with the creation of the modern municipalities system on April 1, 1889. These villages merged on January 1, 1955, to form the town of Kawabe. Kawabe merged on May 1, 2005, with the villages of Nakatsu and Miyama to form the town of Hidakagawa.

== Government ==
Hidakagawa has a mayor-council form of government with a directly elected mayor and a unicameral city council of 12 members. Hidakagawa collectively with the other municipalities of Hidaka District, contributes three members to the Wakayama Prefectural Assembly. In terms of national politics, the town is part of Wakayama 3rd district of the lower house of the Diet of Japan.

== Economy ==
The economy of Hidakagawa is centered on horticulture and agriculture. The town is noted for its mandarin orangess, and for the production of binchōtan charcoal.

== Education ==
Hidakagawa has nine public elementary schools and four public middle schools operated by the town government, and two public high schools operated by the Wakayama Prefectural Board of Education.

== Transportation ==
=== Railway ===
JR West – Kisei Main Line

- Wasa

=== Highways ===
- Yuasa-Gobo Road
- National Route 424

== Local attractions ==
- Dōjō-ji, famous temple and the setting for the Noh play Dōjōji
