= Kozagawa =

Kozagawa 古座川町
- Town
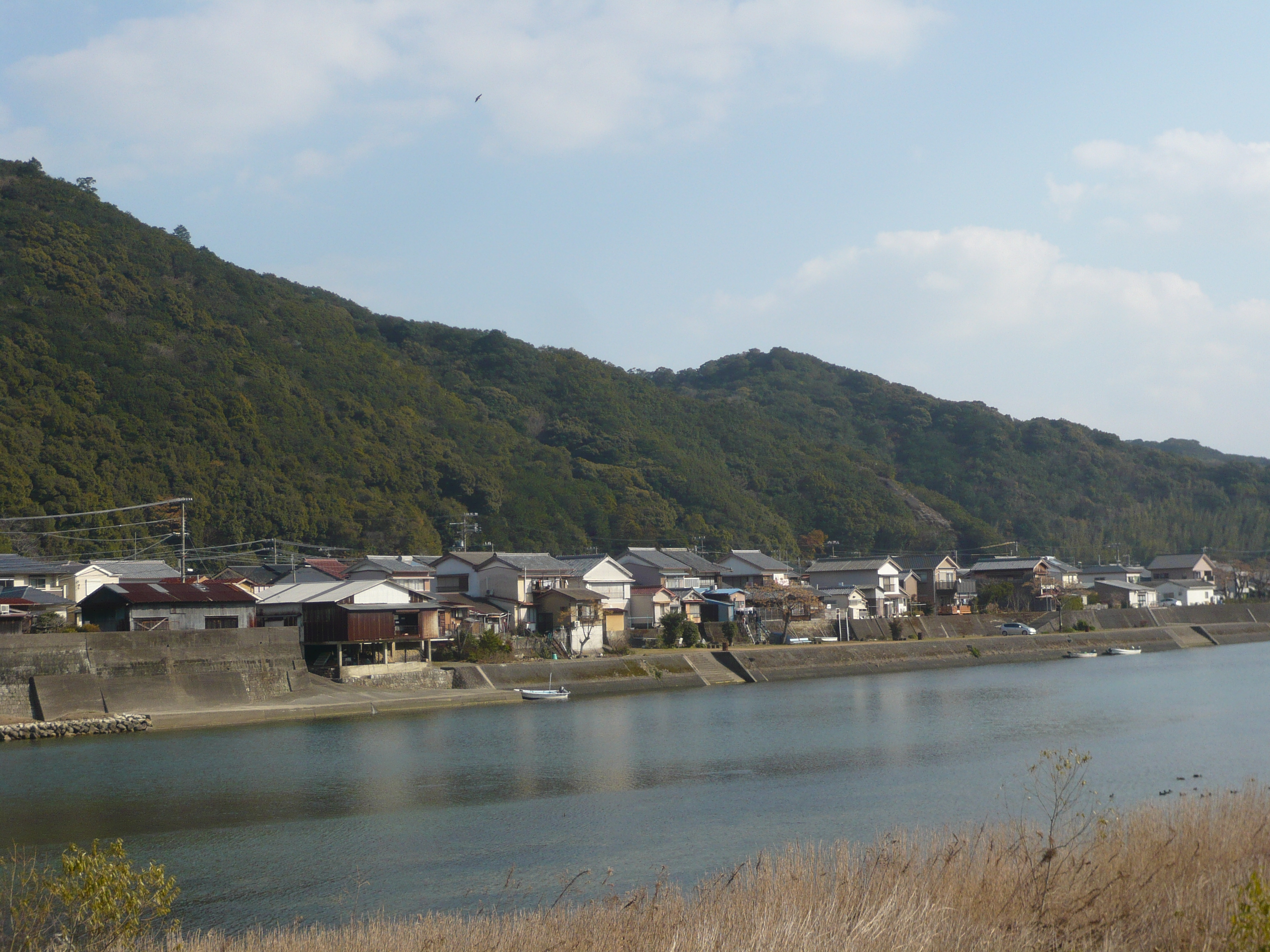
- View of Kozagawa

- Flag Emblem

- Location of Kozagawa in Wakayama Prefecture

- Location in Japan
- Coordinates: 33°32′N 135°49′E
- Country: Japan
- Region: Kansai
- Prefecture: Wakayama
- District: Higashimuro

Government
  - Mayor: Takeo Takeda (since July 2008)

Area
  - Total: 294.52 km^{2} (113.71 sq mi)

Population (November 1, 2021)
  - Total: 2,537
  - Density: 8.614/km^{2} (22.31/sq mi)
- Time zone: UTC+09:00 (JST)
- City hall address: Takaike 673-2, Kozagawa-cho, Higashimuro-gun, Wakayama-ken 649-4104
- Climate: Cfa
- Website: Official website
- Symbols
- Bird: Cettia diphone
- Flower: Prunus jamasakura
- Tree: Cryptomeria japonica

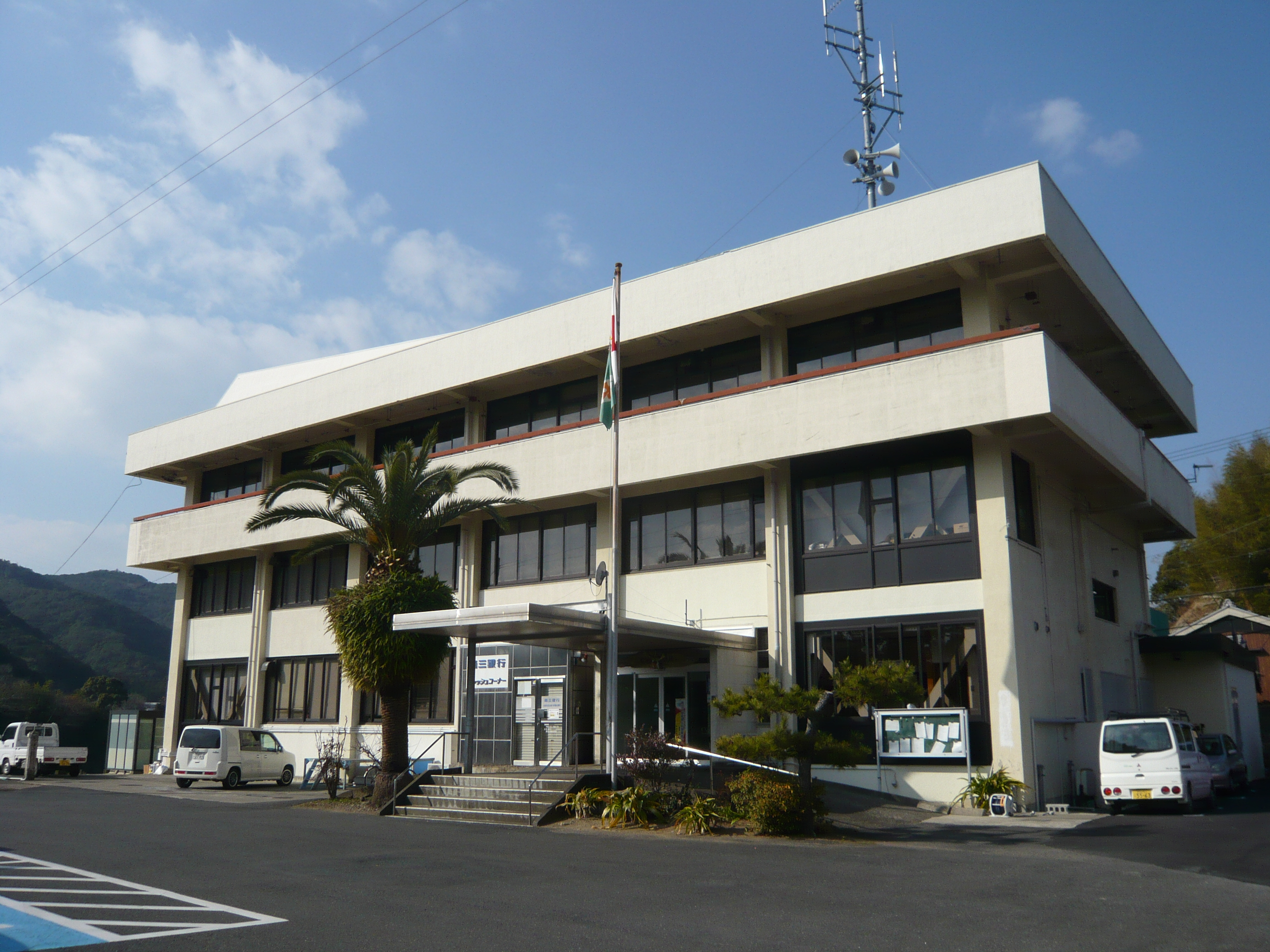
Kozagawa Town Hall

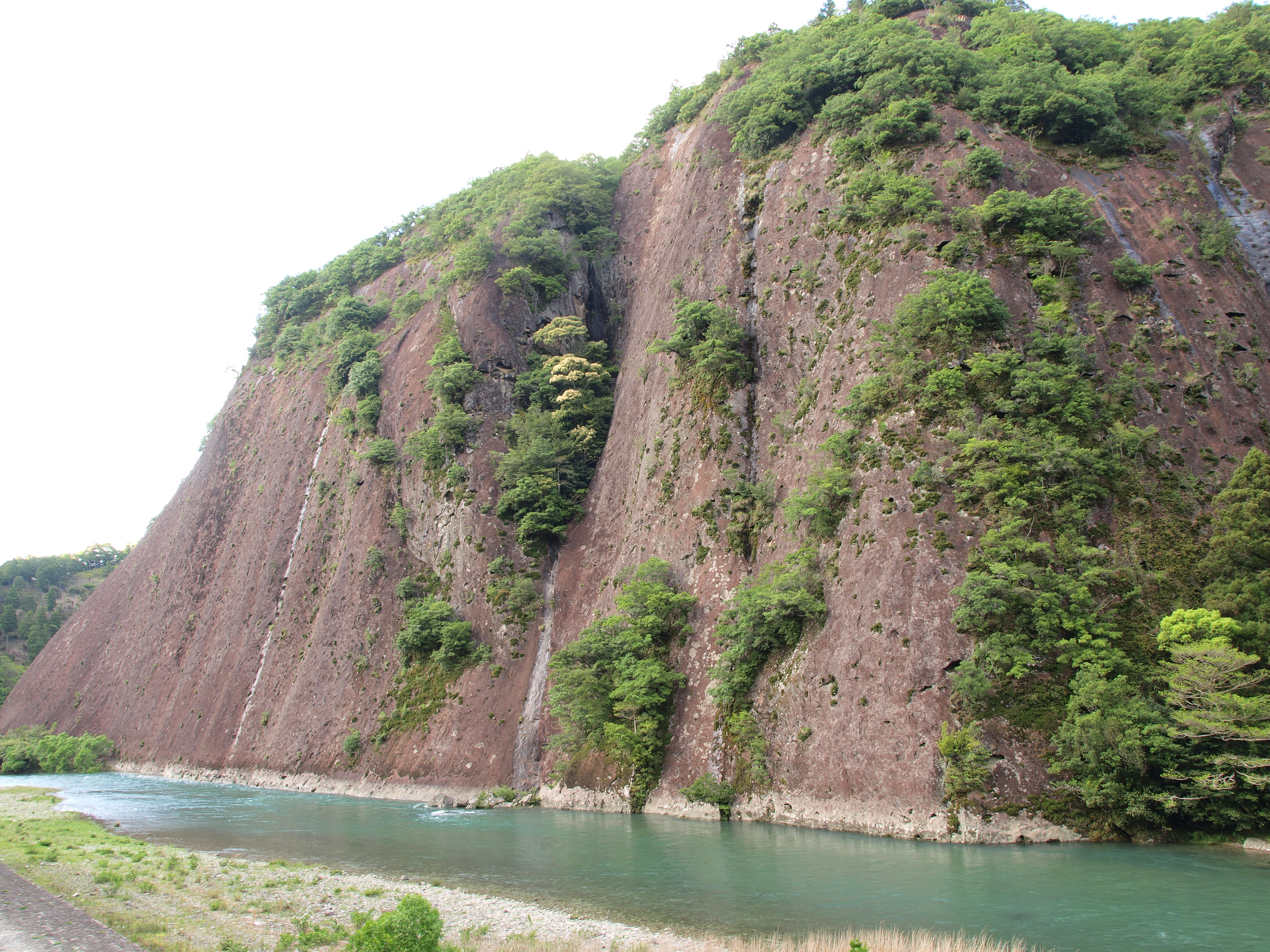
Kozagawa Ichimai-iwa

Kozagawa (古座川町, Kozagawa-chō) is a town located in Higashimuro District, Wakayama Prefecture, Japan. As of 1 November 2021, the town had an estimated population of 2,537 in 1415 households and a population density of 8.6 persons per km². The total area of the town is 294.23 square kilometres (113.60 sq mi). The total area of Kozagawa is the second largest in Wakayama Prefecture. However, the population of Kozagawa Town is the second smallest in the prefecture.

== Geography ==
Kozagawa is located in an inland area near the southernmost tip of the Kii Peninsula. The topography is forested and mountainous, with the forest area occupying about 90% of the total town area. The Koza River runs through the town from northwest to southeast and the settled areas are all along the floodplain of this river.

=== Climate ===
Kozagawa has a humid subtropical climate (Köppen Cfa) characterized by warm summers and cool winters with light to no snowfall. The average annual temperature in Kozagawa is 14.8 °C (58.6 °F). The average annual rainfall is 3,591.2 mm (141.39 in) with July as the wettest month. The temperatures are highest on average in August, at around 25.6 °C (78.1 °F), and lowest in January, at around 4.2 °C (39.6 °F). The area is subject to typhoons in summer.

Climate data for Kozagawa (1991−2020 normals, extremes 1979−present)
Month	Jan	Feb	Mar	Apr	May	Jun	Jul	Aug	Sep	Oct	Nov	Dec	Year
Record high °C (°F)	20.7 (69.3)	23.4 (74.1)	25.9 (78.6)	29.8 (85.6)	32.1 (89.8)	35.6 (96.1)	37.5 (99.5)	38.9 (102.0)	35.8 (96.4)	31.1 (88.0)	25.6 (78.1)	22.1 (71.8)	38.9 (102.0)
Mean daily maximum °C (°F)	10.8 (51.4)	12.1 (53.8)	15.4 (59.7)	20.1 (68.2)	24.0 (75.2)	26.2 (79.2)	30.1 (86.2)	31.2 (88.2)	28.2 (82.8)	23.4 (74.1)	18.3 (64.9)	13.1 (55.6)	21.1 (69.9)
Daily mean °C (°F)	4.2 (39.6)	5.2 (41.4)	8.6 (47.5)	13.3 (55.9)	17.7 (63.9)	21.2 (70.2)	25.0 (77.0)	25.6 (78.1)	22.5 (72.5)	17.2 (63.0)	11.3 (52.3)	6.2 (43.2)	14.8 (58.7)
Mean daily minimum °C (°F)	−1.0 (30.2)	−0.5 (31.1)	2.4 (36.3)	7.0 (44.6)	12.0 (53.6)	16.9 (62.4)	21.1 (70.0)	21.6 (70.9)	18.4 (65.1)	12.5 (54.5)	6.0 (42.8)	0.9 (33.6)	9.8 (49.6)
Record low °C (°F)	−6.9 (19.6)	−6.8 (19.8)	−5.1 (22.8)	−3.2 (26.2)	0.9 (33.6)	7.2 (45.0)	14.0 (57.2)	12.4 (54.3)	7.3 (45.1)	1.0 (33.8)	−2.7 (27.1)	−5.8 (21.6)	−6.9 (19.6)
Average precipitation mm (inches)	113.4 (4.46)	161.8 (6.37)	262.7 (10.34)	296.4 (11.67)	315.1 (12.41)	483.5 (19.04)	505.9 (19.92)	406.1 (15.99)	461.0 (18.15)	293.2 (11.54)	179.8 (7.08)	112.4 (4.43)	3,591.2 (141.39)
Average precipitation days (≥ 1.0 mm)	6.7	8.2	11.4	11.1	11.4	15.6	14.5	13.6	13.8	11.4	8.5	6.6	132.8
Mean monthly sunshine hours	191.1	173.4	189.0	191.8	182.1	116.1	147.3	184.7	133.1	154.3	166.1	184.6	2,014.1
Source: Japan Meteorological Agency

== Demographics ==
The population of Kozagawa has decreased significantly since 1950, and is now less than a third of what it was a century ago.

Historical population
Year	Pop.	±%
1920	10,579	—
1930	9,730	−8.0%
1940	9,135	−6.1%
1950	10,127	+10.9%
1960	8,599	−15.1%
1970	6,078	−29.3%
1980	5,030	−17.2%
1990	4,193	−16.6%
2000	3,726	−11.1%
2010	3,103	−16.7%

== History ==
The area of the modern town of Kozagawa was within ancient Kii Province. With the establishment of the modern municipalities system on April 1, 1889, the following villages were formed:

- Takaike Village (高池村) - (merger of Takagawara hamlet, Ikenoguchi hamlet, Ikenoyama hamlet, Kusu hamlet, Utsuki hamlet, Tsukinose hamlet, and Kashiyama hamlet).
- Myojin Village (明神村) - (merger of Nakazaki hamlet, Aise hamlet, Tachiaigawa hamlet, Tsurugawa hamlet, Ichiburi hamlet, Oh'yanagi hamlet, Uruno hamlet, Tachiai hamlet, Shimonaka hamlet, Kawaguchi hamlet, Takase hamlet, Nukumi hamlet, and Mine hamlet).
- Mitogawa Village (三尾川村) - (merger of Mitogawa hamlet, Nabera hamlet, Ohkawa hamlet, Nagaoi hamlet, Utsuo hamlet, Hinatagawa hamlet, and Kurozu hamlet).
- Kogawa Village (小川村) - (merger of Choutsuo hamlet, Ohkuwa hamlet, Nishiakagi hamlet, Tagawa hamlet, Komorigawa hamlet, Uzutsui hamlet, Sarugawa hamlet, and Yamate hamlet).
- Shichigawa Village (七川村) - (merger of Nishikawa hamlet, Shimotsuyu hamlet, Narukawa hamlet, Matsune hamlet, Hirai hamlet, Inodani hamlet, Sada hamlet, and Soinogawa hamlet).

In 1900, Takaike Village was promoted to town status. On March 31, 1956, Takaike Town, Myojin Village, Mitogawa Village, Kogawa Village, and Shichigawa Village merged and became Kozagawa Town.

== Government ==
Kozagawa has a mayor-council form of government with a directly elected mayor and a unicameral city council of 10 members. Kozagawa collectively with the other municipalities of Higashimuro District contributes two members to the Wakayama Prefectural Assembly. In terms of national politics, the town is part of Wakayama 3rd district of the lower house of the Diet of Japan. The present town mayor is Takeo Takeda (武田丈夫) (2008- ).

== Economy ==
The economy of Kozagawa is centered on forestry and agriculture. Because of warm and wet climate, from ancient times, good-quality woods, called "Kozagawa-Zai (古座川材)", have been produced.

== Education ==
Kozagawa has three public elementary schools and two public middle schools operated by the town government. The town does not have a high school. Hokkaido University's Northern Biosphere Field Science Center Wakayama Research Forest is located in Kozagawa.

== Transportation ==
=== Railway ===
Kozagawa has no commercial passenger rail service. The nearest station is Koza Station of JR Kisei Main Line, located in Kushimoto.

=== Highways ===
- National Route 371

== Notable people ==
- Shingo Tatsumi (巽真吾), professional baseball player
