= Wakayama Prefecture =

Prefecture of Japan

Coordinates: 34°3′N 135°21′E

Wakayama Prefecture 和歌山県
- Prefecture

Japanese transcription(s)
  - Japanese: 和歌山県
  - Rōmaji: Wakayama-ken
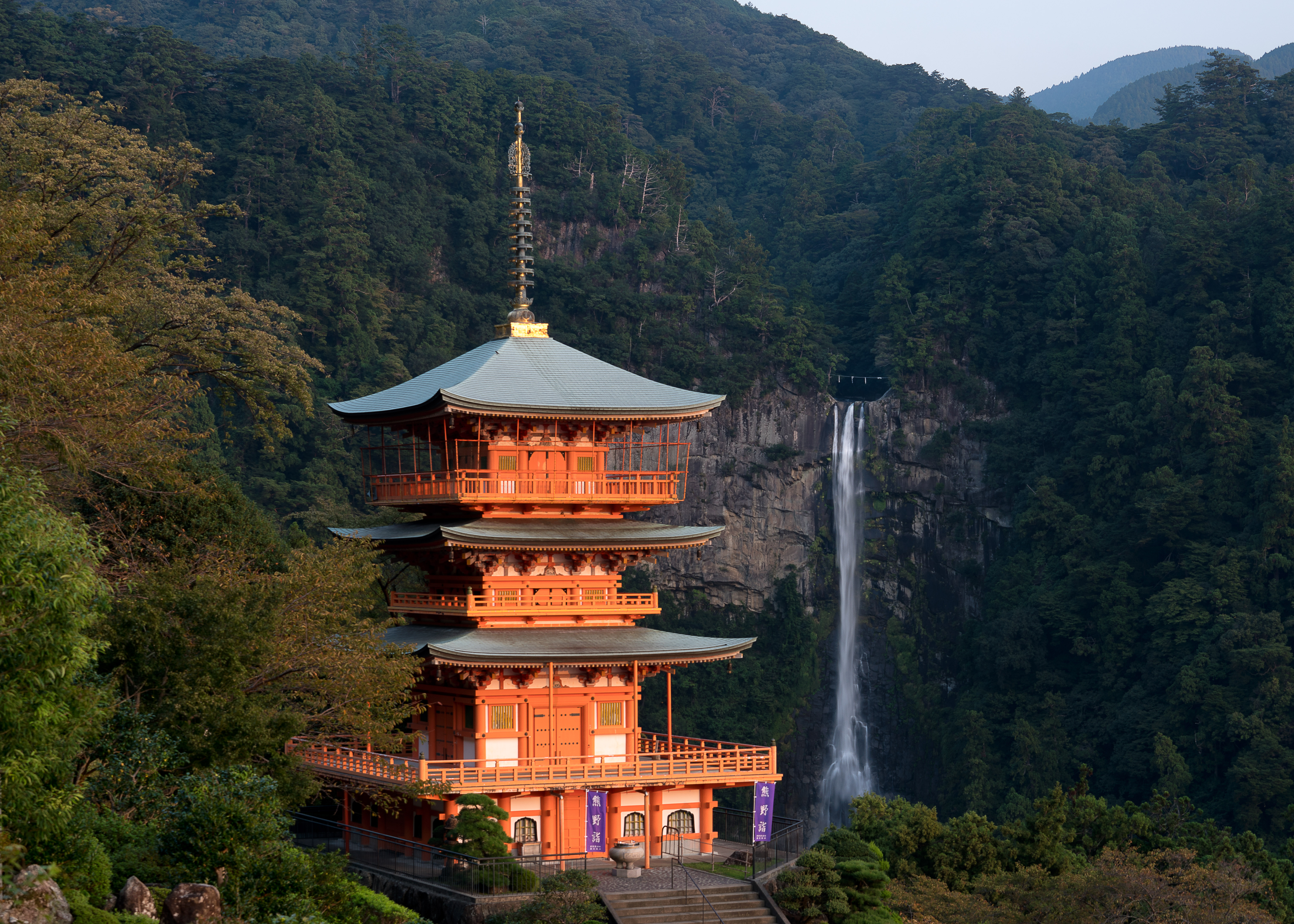
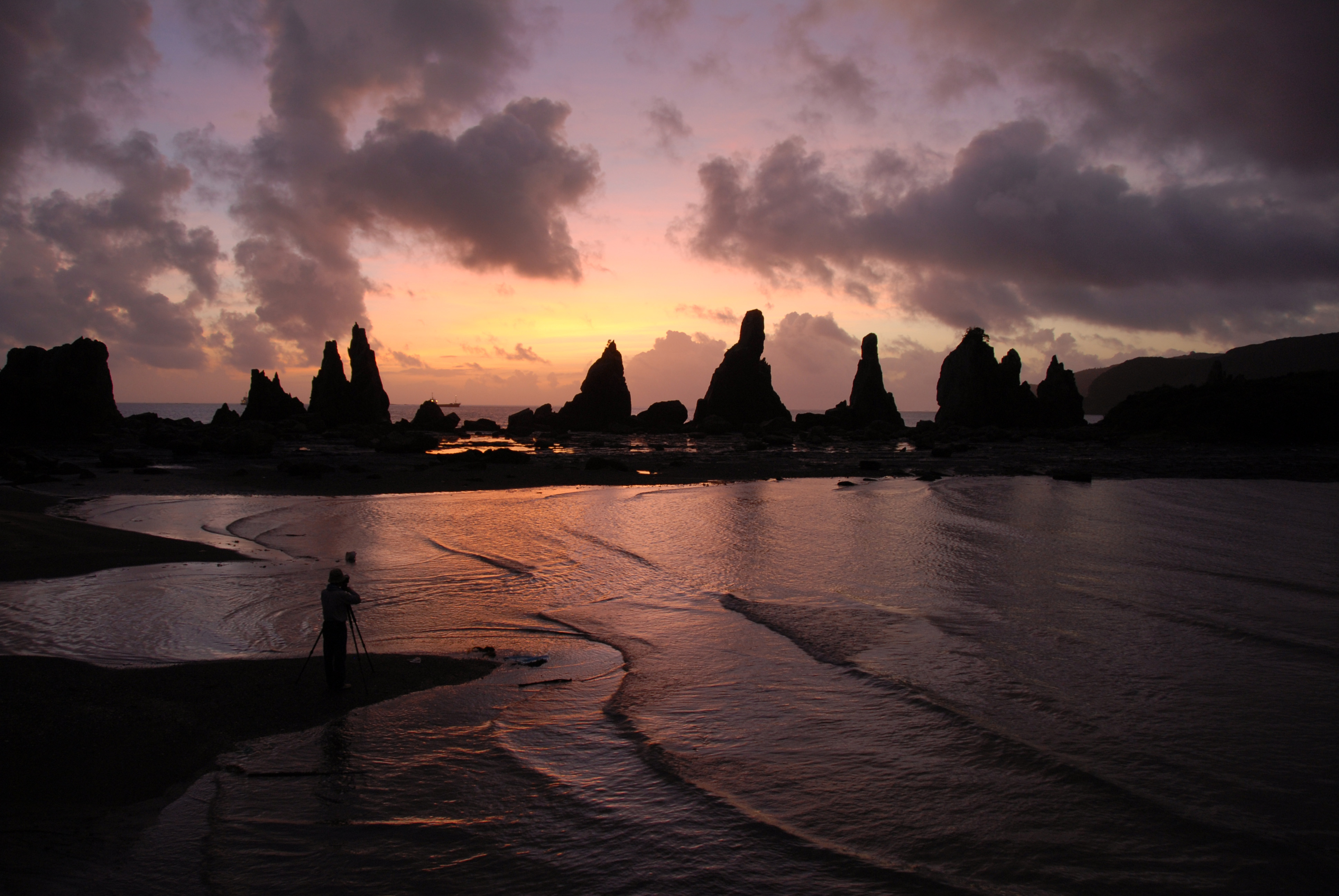
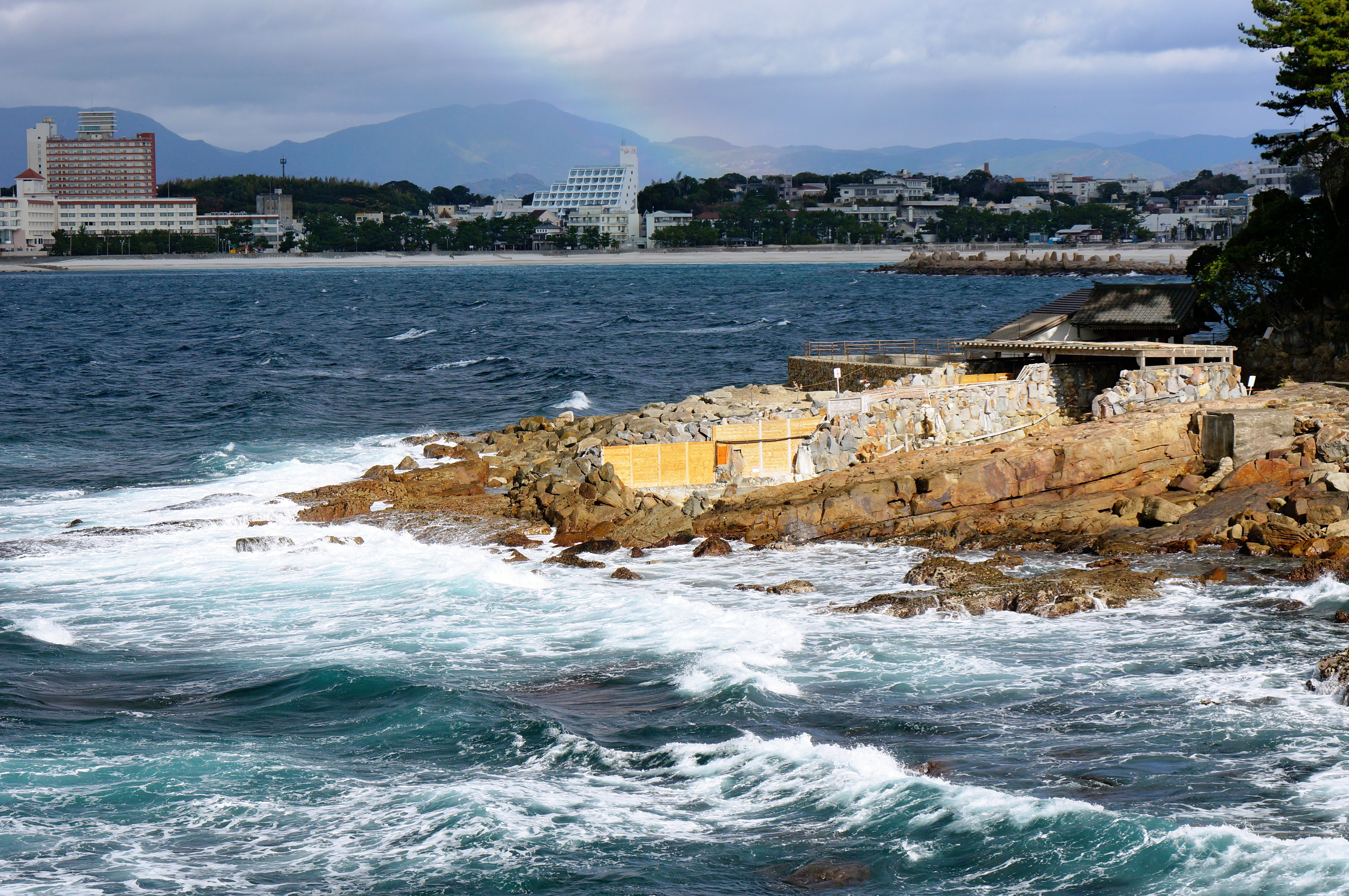
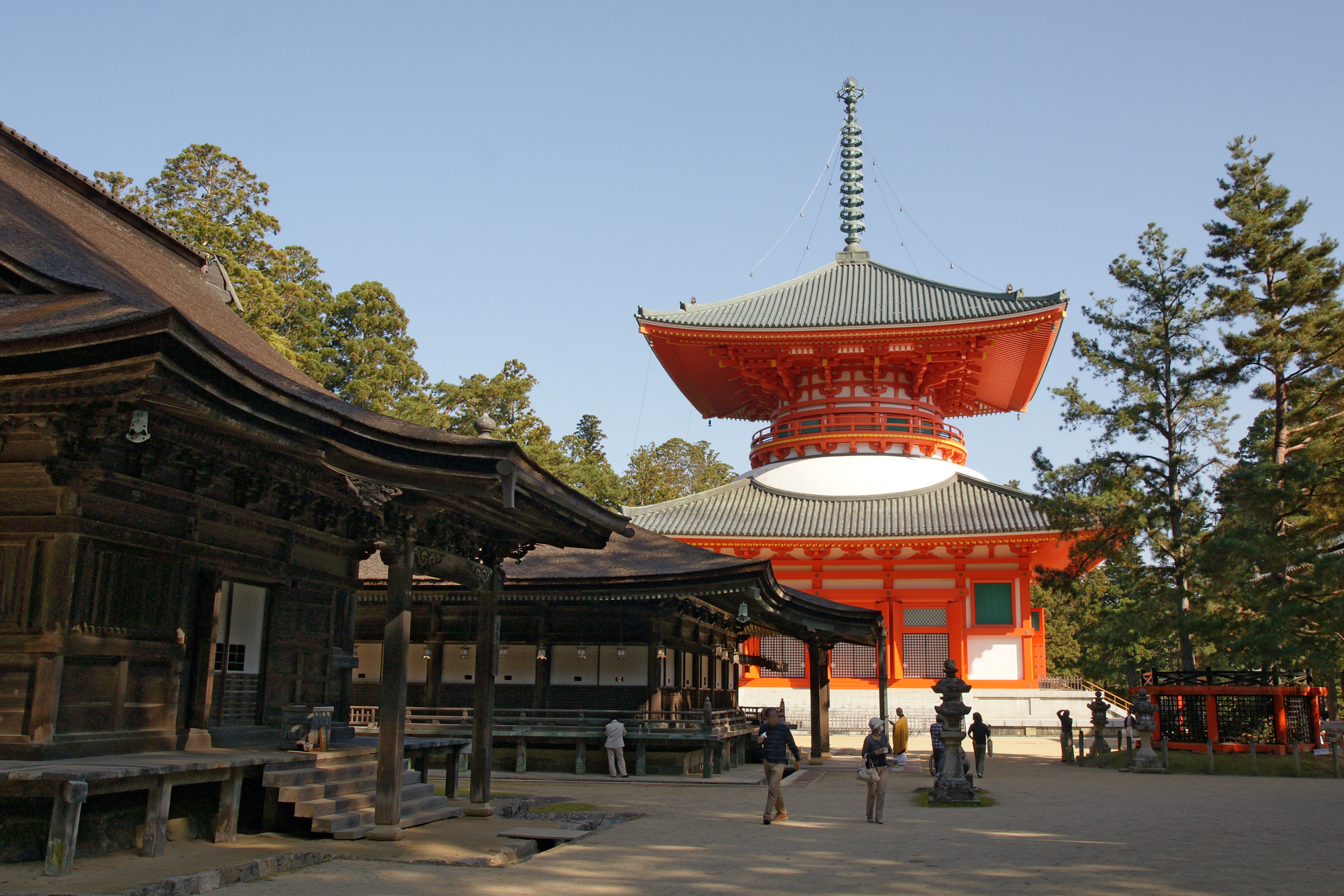
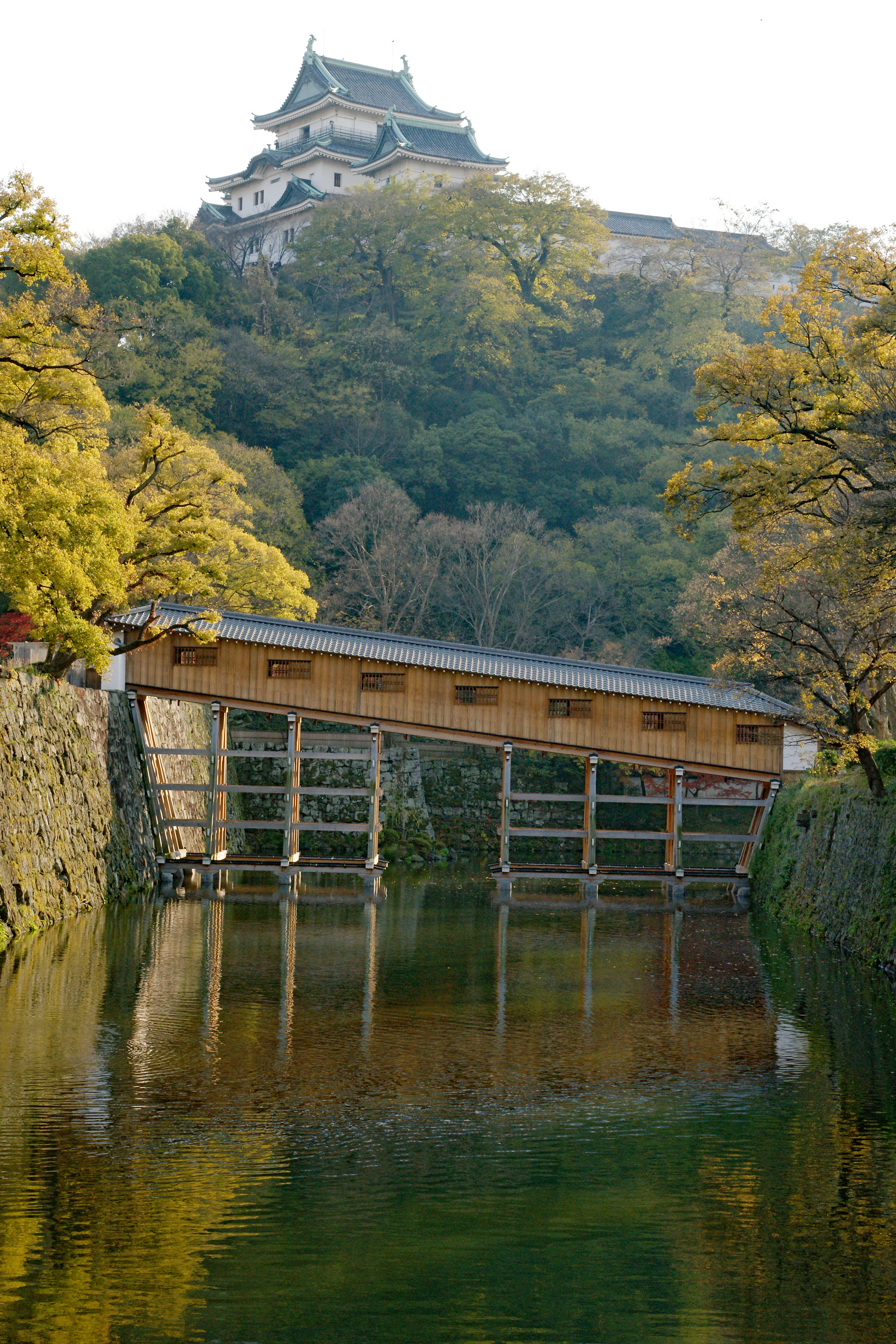
- Seiganto-ji's pagoda and Nachi Falls Kushimoto Shirahama Kongōbu-ji Wakayama Castle

- Flag Symbol
- Anthem: Wakayama kenminka
- Country: Japan
- Region: Kansai
- Island: Honshū
- Capital: Wakayama (city)
- Subdivisions: Districts: 6, Municipalities: 30

Government
  - Governor: Izumi Miyazaki

Area
  - Total: 4,724.69 km^{2} (1,824.21 sq mi)
  - Rank: 30th

Population (1 February 2025)
  - Total: 876,030
  - Rank: 39th
  - Density: 185/km^{2} (480/sq mi)
  - Dialects: Kishū

GDP
  - Total: JP¥ 3,996 billion US$ 29.5 billion (2022)
- ISO 3166 code: JP-30
- Website: www.wakayama.lg.jp/ english/
- Symbols of Japan
- Bird: Japanese white-eye (Zosterops japonica)
- Flower: Ume blossom (Prunus mume)
- Tree: Ubame oak (Quercus phillyraeoides)

Wakayama Prefecture (和歌山県, Wakayama-ken; Japanese pronunciation: [β̞ä̀.kä́.jä̀.mä̀, -jä́.mä́.kè̞ɴ̀]) is a prefecture of Japan located in the Kansai region of Honshu. Wakayama Prefecture has a population of 876,030 (as of 1 February 2025) and a geographic area of 4,724 square kilometres (1,824 sq mi). Wakayama Prefecture borders Osaka Prefecture to the north, and Mie Prefecture and Nara Prefecture to the northeast.

Wakayama is the capital and largest city of Wakayama Prefecture, with other major cities including Tanabe, Hashimoto, and Kinokawa. Wakayama Prefecture is located on the southwestern coast of the Kii Peninsula on the Kii Channel, connecting the Pacific Ocean and Seto Inland Sea, across from Tokushima Prefecture on the island of Shikoku.

== History ==
Present-day Wakayama is mostly the western part of the province of Kii.

=== 1953 flood disaster ===
On July 17–18, 1953, a torrential heavy rain occurred, followed by collapse of levees, river flooding and landslides in a wide area. Many bridges and houses were destroyed. According to an officially confirmed report by the Government of Japan, 1,015 people died, with 5,709 injured and 7,115 houses lost.

== Geography ==
Map of Wakayama Prefecture. City Town Village

As of 31 March 2020, 13 percent of the total land area of the prefecture was designated as Natural Parks, namely the Setonaikai and Yoshino-Kumano National Parks; Kongō-Ikoma-Kisen and Kōya-Ryūjin Quasi-National Parks; and Enju Kaigan, Hatenashi Sanmyaku, Hikigawa, Jōgamori Hokodai, Kōyasanchō Ishimichi-Tamagawakyō, Kozagawa, Nishiarida, Oishi Kōgen, Ōtōsan, Ryūmonzan, Shiramisan-Wadagawakyō, and Shirasaki Kaigan Prefectural Natural Parks.

=== Cities ===
Nine cities are in Wakayama Prefecture:

Name		Area (km^{2})	Population	Map
Rōmaji	Kanji	Area (km^{2})	Population	Map
Arida	有田市	36.91	27,963	
Gobō	御坊市	43.78	27,483	
Hashimoto	橋本市	130.31	62,941	
Iwade	岩出市	38.5	53,280	
Kainan	海南市	101.18	51,112	
Kinokawa	紀の川市	228.24	61,850	
Shingū	新宮市	255.43	26,815	
Tanabe	田辺市	1,026.91	70,410	
Wakayama (capital)	和歌山市	210.25	360,664	

=== Towns and villages ===
These are the towns and villages in each district:

Name		Area (km^{2})	Population	District	Type	Map
Rōmaji	Kanji	Area (km^{2})	Population	District	Type	Map
Aridagawa	有田川町	351.77	26,245	Arida District	Town	
Hidaka	日高町	46.42	7,666	Hidaka District	Town	
Hidakagawa	日高川町	331.61	9,615	Hidaka District	Town	
Hirogawa	広川町	65.35	7,059	Arida District	Town	
Inami	印南町	113.63	7,949	Hidaka District	Town	
Kamitonda	上富田町	57.49	15,047	Nishimuro District	Town	
Katsuragi	かつらぎ町	151.73	16,686	Ito District	Town	
Kimino	紀美野町	128.31	8,989	Kaisō District	Town	
Kitayama	北山村	48.21	432	Higashimuro District	Village	
Kōya	高野町	137.08	3,279	Ito District	Town	
Kozagawa	古座川町	294.52	2,749	Higashimuro District	Town	
Kudoyama	九度山町	44.19	4,295	Ito District	Town	
Kushimoto	串本町	135.78	16,243	Higashimuro District	Town	
Mihama	美浜町	12.79	7,391	Hidaka District	Town	
Minabe	みなべ町	120.26	12,561	Hidaka District	Town	
Nachikatsuura	那智勝浦町	183.45	17,261	Higashimuro District	Town	
Shirahama	白浜町	201.04	23,325	Nishimuro District	Town	
Susami	すさみ町	174.71	4,011	Nishimuro District	Town	
Taiji	太地町	5.96	3,428	Higashimuro District	Town	
Yuasa	湯浅町	20.8	11,960	Arida District	Town	
Yura	由良町	30.74	5,738	Hidaka District	Town	

== Demographics ==
Wakayama prefecture population pyramid in 2020

Since 1996, population of Wakayama Prefecture has kept declining, and since 2010, it has been the only prefecture in Kansai region with population below 1,000,000. In 2017, Wakayama is ranked 40th by population in Japan with a population of 944,320. In the 2020 census, close to 32% of the population was over 65 years of age - the highest percentage in Japan and one of the highest for national subdivisions worldwide.

== Politics ==
Governor Shūhei Kishimoto was elected on 27 November 2022.

=== Prefectural assembly ===
As of 17 May 2023
Political party	Number of seats
Liberal Democratic Party	28
Reform Club (改新クラブ)	5
Komeito	3
Nippon Ishin no Kai	3
Japanese Communist Party	1
Independent society	1
Independent	1

== List of governors of Wakayama ==
State-appointed governors:

- Masaomi Tsuda (津田正臣): from 25 November 1871 to 25 January 1872
- Hidetomo Kitajima (北島秀朝): from 25 January 1872 to 13 October 1873
- Kunikiyo Kōyama (神山郡廉): from 13 October 1873 to 20 October 1873
- Kanae Matsumoto (松本鼎): from 20 October 1873 to 26 December 1889
- Tadaakira Ishii (石井忠亮): from 26 December 1889 to 9 April 1891
- Sadaaki Senda (千田貞暁): from 9 April 1891 to 15 January 1892
- Morikata Oki (沖守固): from 15 January 1892 to 7 April 1897
- Kan'ichi Kubota (久保田貫一): from 7 April 1897 to 8 October 1898
- Masaaki Nomura (野村政明): from 8 October 1898 to 7 April 1899
- Hisashi Ogura (小倉久): from 7 April 1899 to 25 October 1900
- Shin'ichirō Tsubaki (椿蓁一郎): from 25 October 1900 to 29 June 1903
- Ienori Kiyosu (清棲家教): from 29 June 1903 to 11 January 1907
- Takio Izawa (伊沢多喜男): from 11 January 1907 to 30 July 1909
- Chikaharu Kawakami (川上親晴): from 30 July 1909 to 4 September 1911
- Takeji Kawamura (川村竹治): from 4 September 1911 to 9 June 1914
- Kogorō Kanokogi (鹿子木小五郎): from June 1914 to 17 December 1917
- Tokikazu Ikematsu (池松時和): from 17 December 1917 to 3 February 1920
- Shinzō Obara (小原新三): from 3 February 1920 to 6 June 1923
- Yoshibumi Satake (佐竹義文): from 6 June 1923 to 24 June 1924
- Kyūichi Hasegawa (長谷川久一): from 24 June 1924 to 22 March 1927
- Tokutarō Shimizu (清水徳太郎): from 22 March 1927 to 17 May 1927
- Umekichi Miyawaki (宮脇梅吉): from 17 May 1927 to 17 November 1927
- Taeru Node (野手耐): from 17 November 1927 to 5 July 1929
- Senzō Tomobe (友部泉蔵): from 5 July 1929 to 26 August 1930
- Toshikatsu Kurahara (蔵原敏捷): from 26 August 1930 to 18 December 1931
- Toshiki Karasawa (唐沢俊樹): from 18 December 1931 to 28 July 1932
- Ryōsaku Shimizu (清水良策): from 28 July 1932 to 10 November 1934
- Nagakazu Fujioka (藤岡長和): from 10 November 1934 to 22 April 1936
- Tokiji Yoshinaga (吉永時次): from 22 April 1936 to 11 January 1939
- Shigeo Shimizu (清水重夫): from 11 January 1939 to 15 October 1940
- Jirō Imamatsu (今松治): from 15 October 1940 to 20 October 1941
- Seizō Hirose (広瀬永造): from 20 October 1941 to 1 August 1944
- Chiaki Kobayashi (小林千秋): from 1 August 1944 to 27 October 1945
- Uichirō Koike (小池卯一郎): from 27 October 1945 to 25 January 1946
- Masao Kanai (金井正夫): from 25 January 1946 to 8 July 1946
- Wakichi Kawakami (川上和吉): from 8 July 1946 to 28 February 1947
- Yoshimaro Takahashi (高橋良麿): from 28 February 1947 to 15 April 1947

Publicly elected governors:

- Shinji Ono (小野真次): from 19 April 1947 to 22 April 1967
- Masao Ohashi (大橋正雄): from 23 April 1967 to 4 October 1975
- Shiro Kariya (仮谷志良): from 23 November 1975 to 22 November 1995
- Isamu Nishiguchi (西口勇): from 23 November 1995 to 13 July 2000
- Yoshiki Kimura (木村良樹): from 3 September 2000 to 2 December 2006
- Yoshinobu Nisaka (仁坂吉伸): from 17 December 2006 to 16 December 2022
- Shūhei Kishimoto (岸本周平): from 17 December 2022 to 15 April 2025
- Izumi Miyazaki (宮崎泉): from 15 April 2025 to present

== Culture ==
Mount Kōya (高野山, Kōya-san) in the Ito District is the headquarters of the Shingon sect of Japanese Buddhism. It is home to one of the first Japanese style Buddhist temples in Japan and remains a pilgrimage site and an increasingly popular tourist destination as people flock to see its ancient temples set amidst the towering cedar trees at the top of the mountain. The Sacred sites and pilgrimage routes in the Kii Mountain Range extend for miles throughout the prefecture and together have been recognized as Japan's 11th UNESCO World Heritage Site.

The Kumano Shrines are on the southern tip of the prefecture. Tomogashima (a cluster of four islands) is part of the prefecture.

== Agriculture ==
=== Orange ===
Wakayama Prefecture ranks first in the production of oranges in Japan. Wakayama has its own brand of oranges, which is produced in Arida District and called 'Arida-Orange'. Arida District, where oranges have been produced for more than 400 years, yields about half of the orange crops in Wakayama today. Furthermore, the yield of Arida-Oranges accounts for about 10 percent of Japanese domestic production of oranges.

=== Chinese flowering plum (Ume) ===
According to the survey by the Ministry of Agriculture, Forestry and Fisheries of Japan, Wakayama stands first in the production of Chinese flowering plum, or ume in Japanese, in Japan. As of 2016, Wakayama made up about 70 percent of Japanese domestic production of ume.

== International relations ==
Wakayama Prefecture has friendship and sister relationships with six places outside Japan:

- Florida, United States
- Galicia, Spain
- Pyrénées-Orientales, France
- Shandong, People's Republic of China
- Sichuan, People's Republic of China
- Sinaloa, Mexico

== Tourism ==
Wakayama Prefecture has hot springs such as Nanki-Shirahama Onsen, Kawayu Onsen, and Yunomine Onsen.

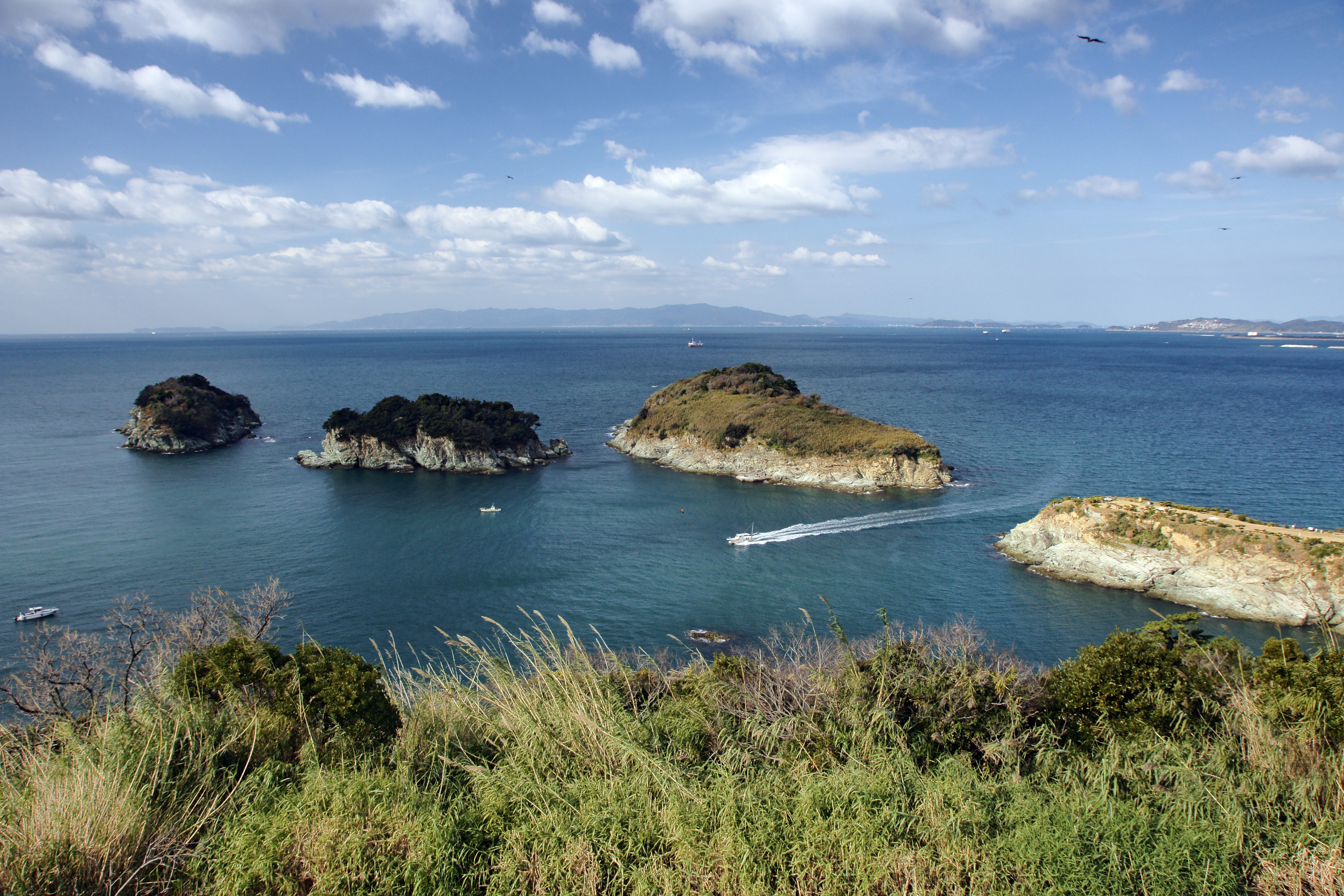
Saikazaki, Wakanoura

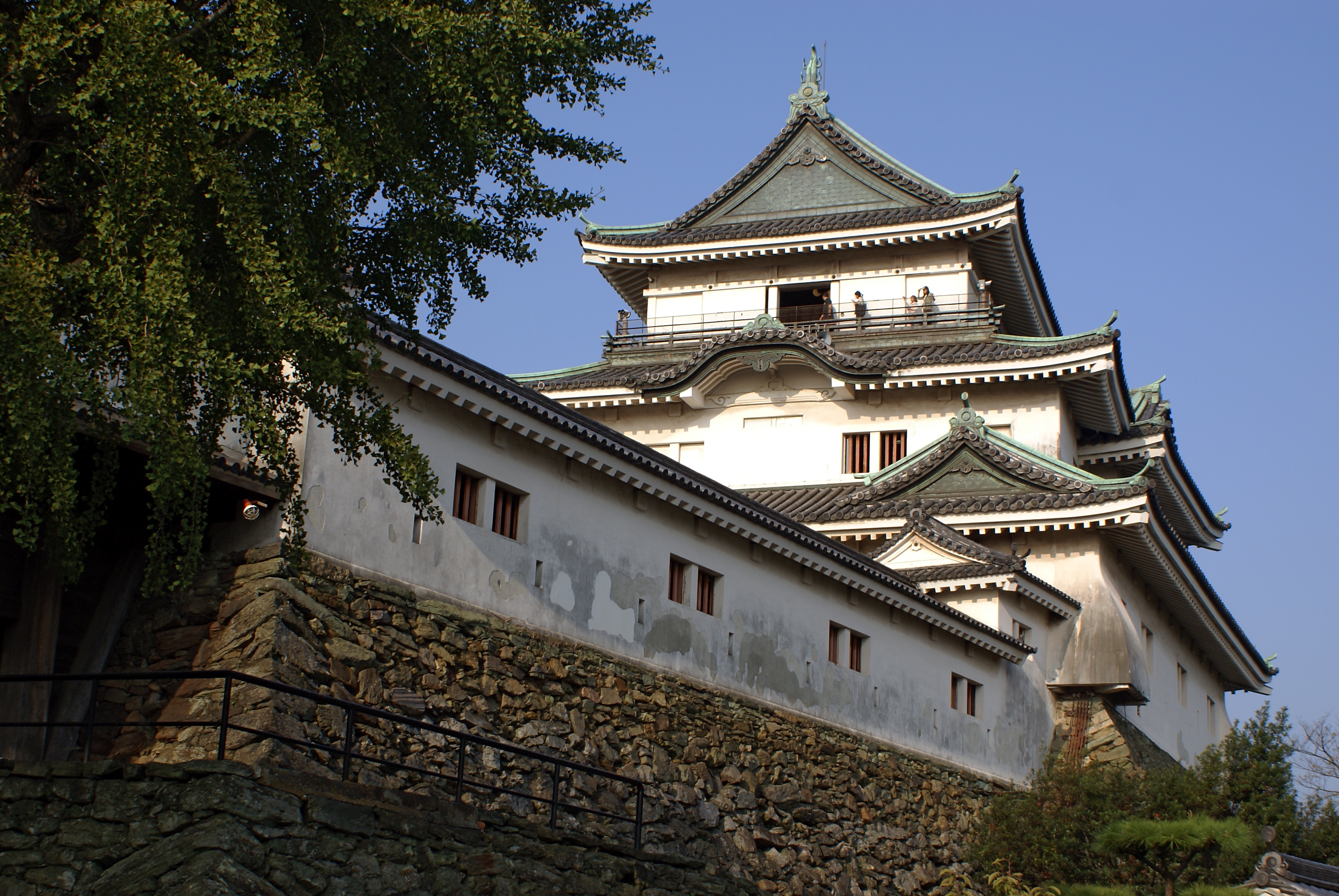
Wakayama Castle

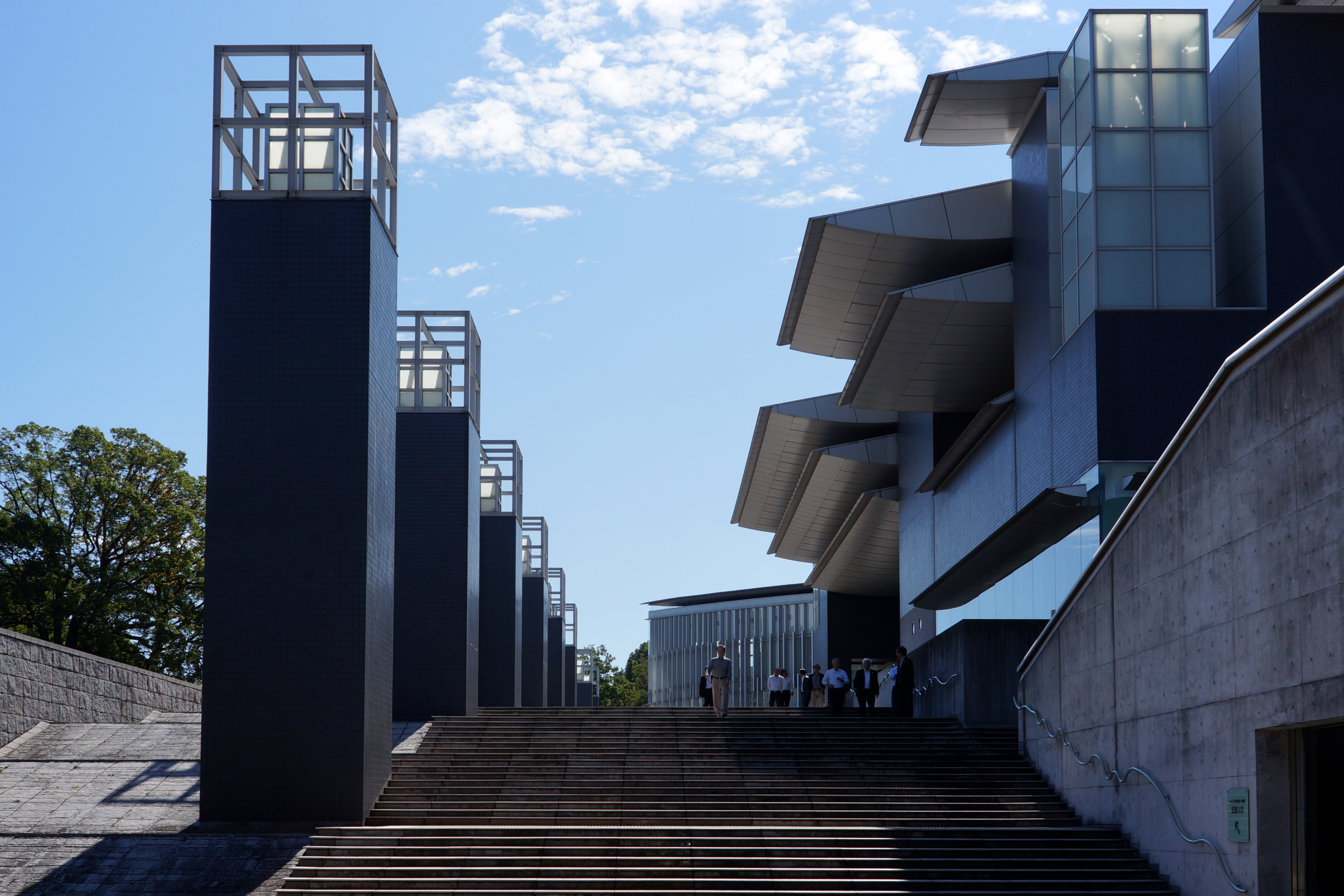
The Museum of Modern Art, Wakayama

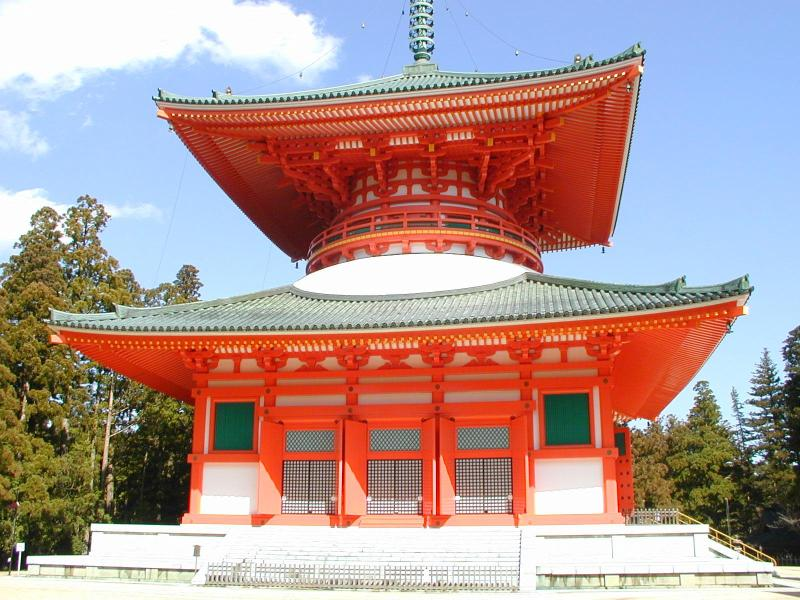
Konpon Daido
(Mount Kōya)

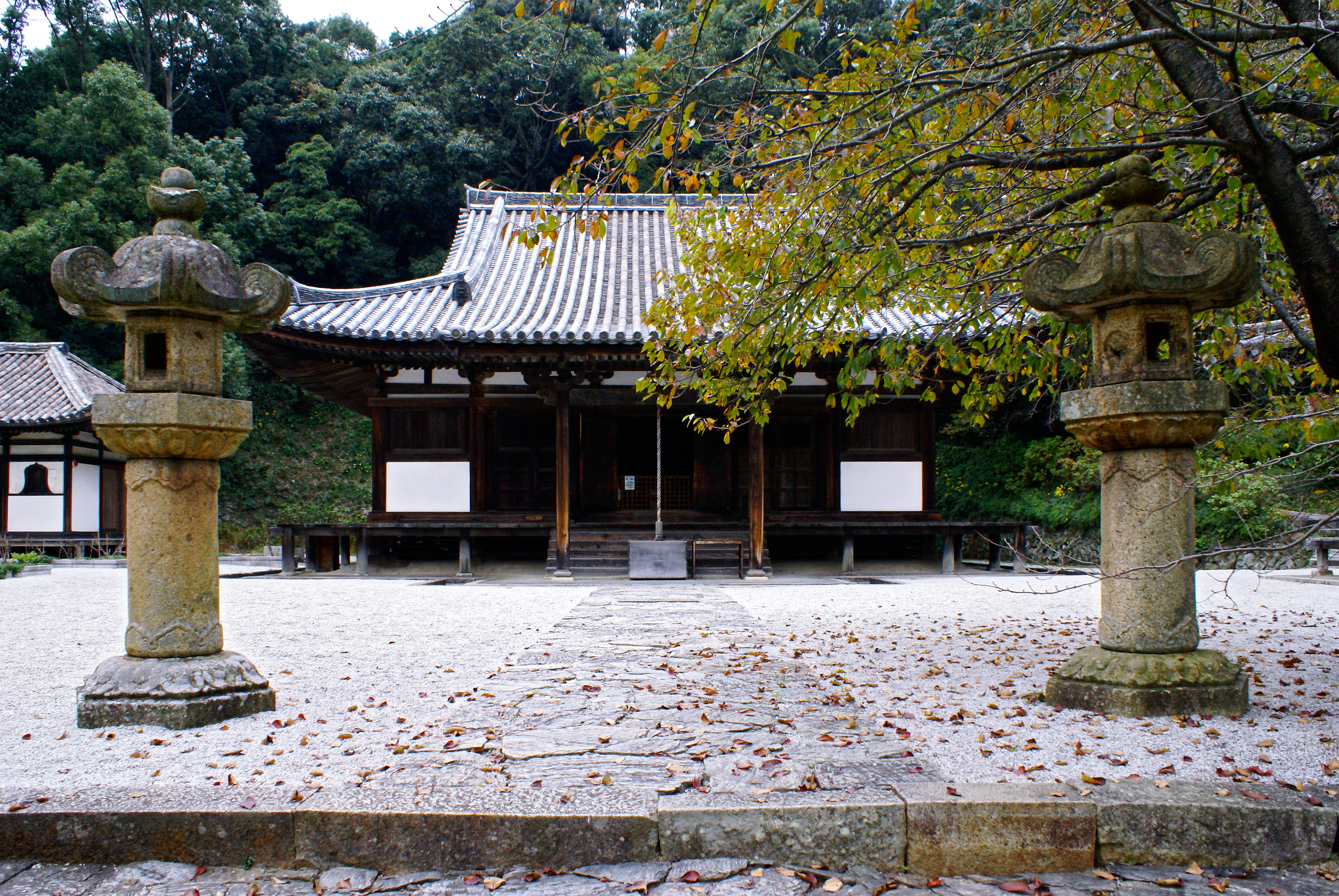
Chōhō-ji

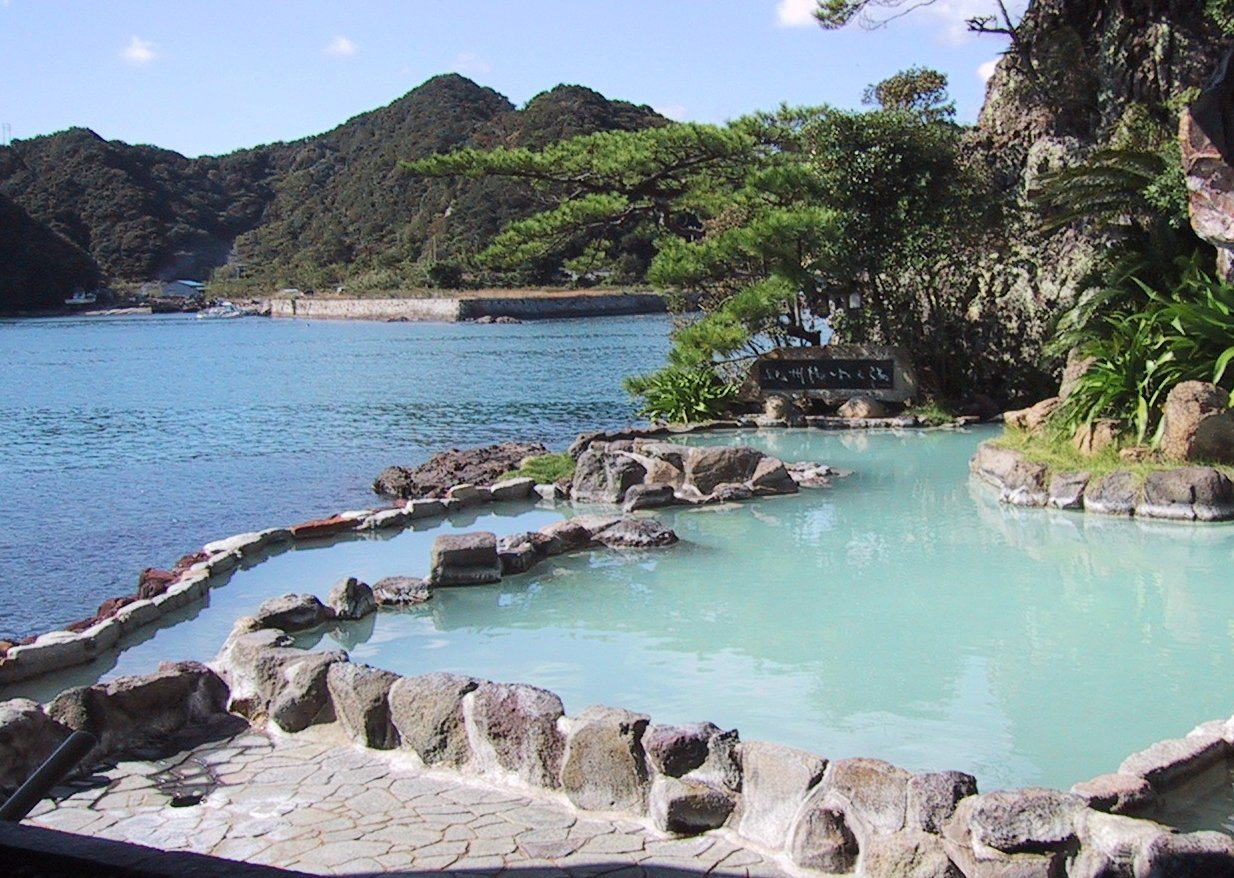
Nanki-Katsuura Onsen

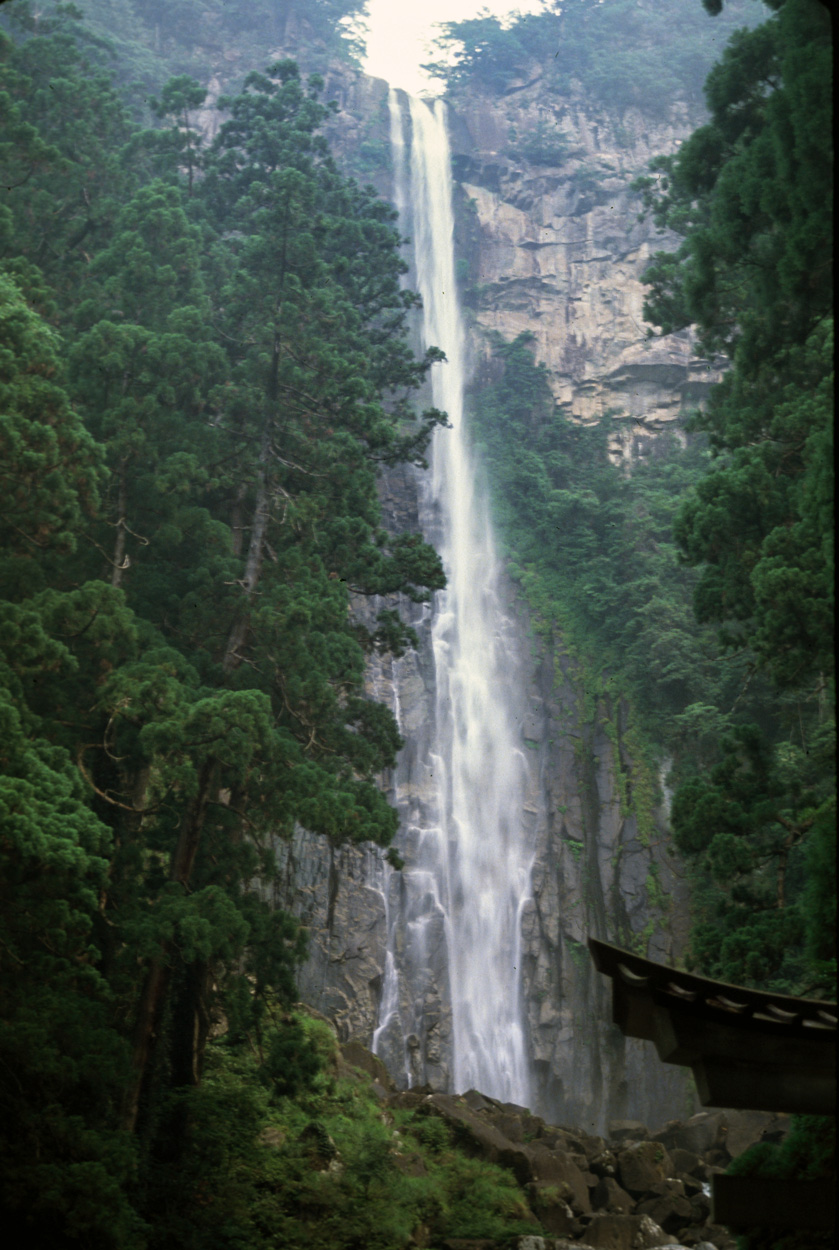
Nachi Falls

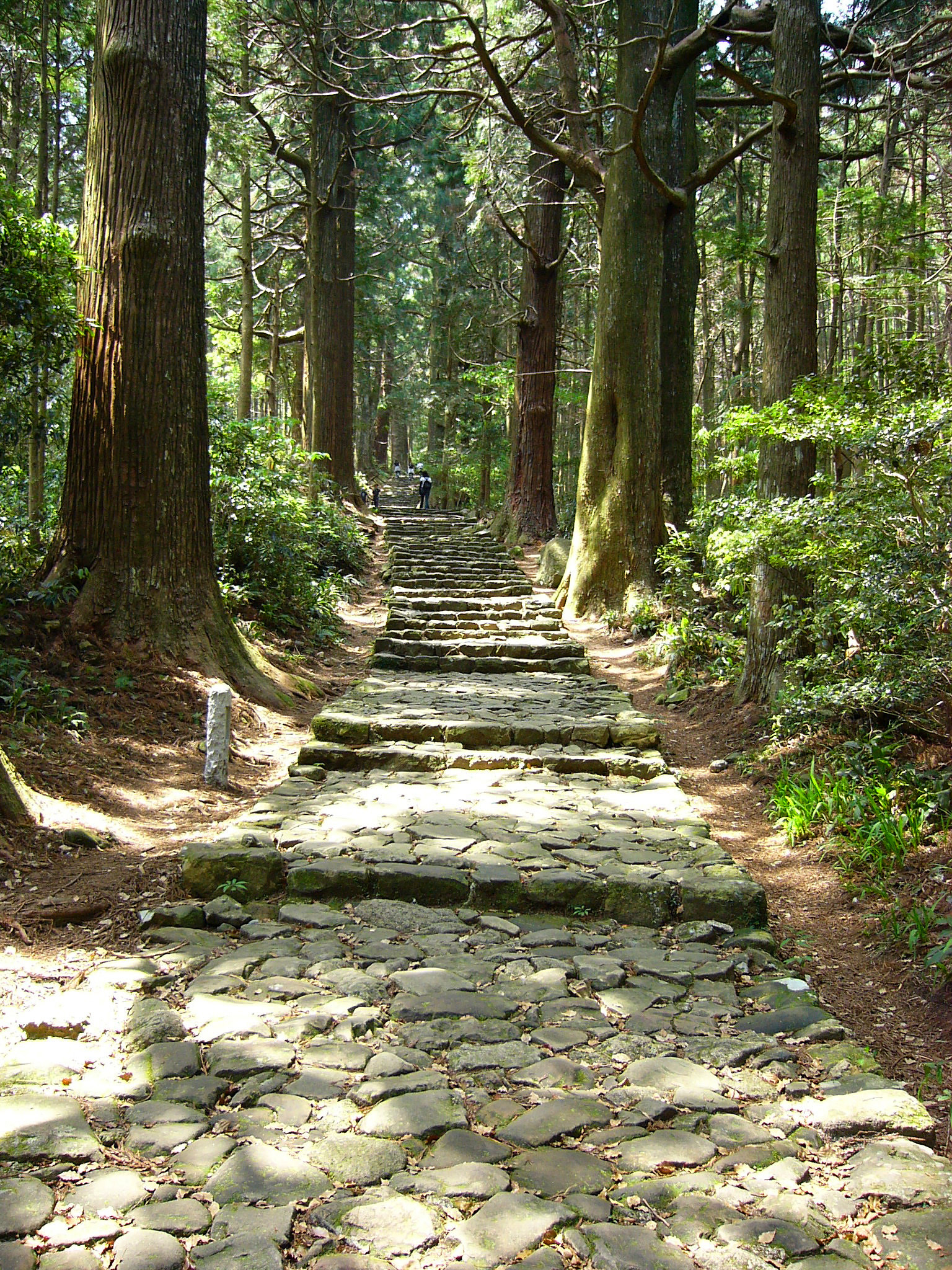
Daimonzaka
(Kumano Kodō)

== Transportation ==
=== Rail ===
- JR Central
  - Kisei Line
- JR West
  - Hanwa Line
  - Kinokuni Line
  - Wakayama Line
- Kishu Railway
- Nankai
  - Kada Line
  - Koya Line
  - Nankai Line
- Wakayama Electric Railway

=== Road ===
==== Expressway ====
- Hanwa Expressway
- Keinawa Expressway
- Nachi Katsuura Road
- Yuasa Gobo Road

==== National highways ====
- Route 24
- Route 26
- Route 42
- Route 168 (Shingu-Gojo-Ikoma-Hirakata)
- Route 169 (Shingu-Kumano-Kawakami-Yoshino-Asuka-Kashihara-Nara)
- Route 311 (Kamitonda-Tanabe-Shingu-kumano-Owase)
- Route 370 (Kainan-Hashimoto-Gojo-Uda-Nara)
- Route 371 (Kawachinagano-Hashimoto-Koya-Kushimoto)
- Route 424

=== Ferry ===
- Wakayama-Tokushima

=== Airport ===
- Nanki Shirahama Airport

However, Kansai International Airport in neighbouring Osaka Prefecture is also used by air travellers from the prefecture which more domestic and international destinations.

== Education ==
=== Universities ===
- Kinki University
- Koyasan University
- Wakayama Medical University
- Wakayama University
