= List of places of scenic beauty of Japan (Wakayama) =

This list is of the places of scenic beauty of Japan located within the Prefecture of Wakayama.

== National Places of Scenic Beauty ==
As of 1 July 2020, twelve Places have been designated at a national level (including one *Special Place of Scenic Beauty); Dorohatchō spans the prefectural borders with Nara and Mie.

Site	Municipality	Comments	Image	Coordinates	Type	Ref.
*Dorohatchō 瀞八丁; Dorohatchō	Shingū	the designation includes an area of Totsukawa in Nara Prefecture and Kumano in Mie Prefecture; also a Natural Monument		33°53′34″N 135°53′33″E	5	
Engetsu Island and Senjōjiki 円月島（高嶋）及び千畳敷; Engetsu-tō (Takashima) oyobi Senjōjiki	Shirahama			33°41′24″N 135°20′11″E	8	
Hashigui-iwa 橋杭岩; Hashigui-iwa	Kushimoto	also a Natural Monument		33°29′07″N 135°47′46″E	5	
Kotonoura Onzan-Soh-En 琴ノ浦 温山荘庭園; Kotonoura Onzan-Soh-En	Kainan			34°09′29″N 135°11′40″E	1	
Negoro-ji Gardens 根来寺庭園; Negoroji teien	Iwade			34°17′13″N 135°18′59″E	1	
Tentoku-in Gardens 天徳院庭園; Tentoku-in teien	Kōya			34°12′42″N 135°35′02″E	1	
Nachi Falls 那智大滝; Nachi-ōtaki	Nachikatsuura			33°40′31″N 135°53′15″E	6	
Kokawa-dera Gardens 粉河寺庭園; Kokawadera teien	Kinokawa			34°16′51″N 135°24′23″E	1	
Yōsui-en 養翠園; Yōsui-en	Wakayama			34°11′36″N 135°09′13″E	1	
Wakanoura 和歌の浦; Wakanoura	Wakayama			34°10′43″N 135°10′31″E	2, 8, 11	
Wakayama Castle Nishonomaru Gardens 和歌山城西之丸庭園（紅葉溪庭園） Wakayama-jō nishinomaru teien (Kōyōkei teien)	Wakayama			34°13′43″N 135°10′15″E	1	
Minakata Mandala Landscape 南方曼陀羅の風景地; Minakata mandara no fūkeichi	Kamitonda, Kushimoto, Shirahama, Tanabe	designation comprises thirteen component sites: Kashima (神島), Tōkei Jinja (鬪雞神社), Susa Jinja (須佐神社), Isaida Inari Jinja (伊作田稲荷神社), Tsugizakura Ōji (継桜王子), Takahara Kumano Jinja (高原熊野神社), Kizetsu-kyō (奇絶峡), Ryūzen-san (龍神山), Yakami Jinja (八上神社), Tanaka Jinja (田中神社), Kuroshima (九龍島), Kotohira Jinja (金刀比羅神社), and Cape Tenjin (天神崎)		33°49′43″N 135°38′03″E	3, 6, 8, 10, 11	

== Prefectural Places of Scenic Beauty ==
As of 1 May 2019, eight Places have been designated at a prefectural level.

Site	Municipality	Comments	Image	Coordinates	Type	Ref.
Wakanoura 和歌の浦; Wakanoura	Wakayama	also a Prefectural Historic Site		34°11′14″N 135°10′22″E		
Fujisaki Benten 藤崎弁天; Fujisaki Benten	Kinokawa			34°15′55″N 135°25′33″E		
Hōzen-in Gardens 宝善院庭園; Hōzen-in teien	Kōya			34°12′48″N 135°35′42″E		
Senri Beach 千里の浜; Senri-no-hama	Minabe	also a Prefectural Natural Monument		36°11′49″N 137°09′24″E		
Hyakkenzan Valley 百間山渓谷; Hyakken-zan keikoku	Tanabe			33°42′49″N 135°37′00″E		
Takinohai 滝ノ 拝 Taki-no-hai	Kozagawa	also a Prefectural Natural Monument		33°36′09″N 135°45′56″E		
Cape Shio 潮岬; Shio-no-misaki	Kushimoto			33°26′14″N 135°45′21″E		
Tamagawa Gorge 玉川峡; Tamagawa-kyō	Kudoyama, Hashimoto			34°16′36″N 135°38′02″E		

== Municipal Places of Scenic Beauty ==
As of 1 May 2019, sixteen Places have been designated at a municipal level.

== Registered Places of Scenic Beauty ==
As of 1 July 2020, six Monuments have been registered (as opposed to designated) as Places of Scenic Beauty at a national level.

Place	Municipality	Comments	Image	Coordinates	Type	Ref.
Kōdai-in Shoin Gardens 光臺院書院庭園; Kōdai-in shoin teien	Kōya			34°12′58″N 135°35′11″E		
Kōdai-in Gardens 光臺院書院庭園; Kōdai-in teien	Kōya			34°13′02″N 135°35′07″E		
Saizen-in Gardens 西禅院庭園; Saizen-in teien	Kōya			34°12′51″N 135°34′47″E		
Shōchi-in Gardens 正智院庭園; Shōchi-in teien	Kōya			34°12′53″N 135°34′43″E		
Hongaku-in Gardens 本覚院庭園; Hongaku-in teien	Kōya			34°12′57″N 135°35′14″E		
Yōchi-in Gardens 桜池院庭園; Yōchi-in teien	Kōya			34°12′42″N 135°34′44″E		

== See also ==
- Cultural Properties of Japan
- List of parks and gardens of Wakayama Prefecture
- List of Historic Sites of Japan (Wakayama)
