= Kōyasan chōishi-michi =

- 高野山町石道 (Japanese)
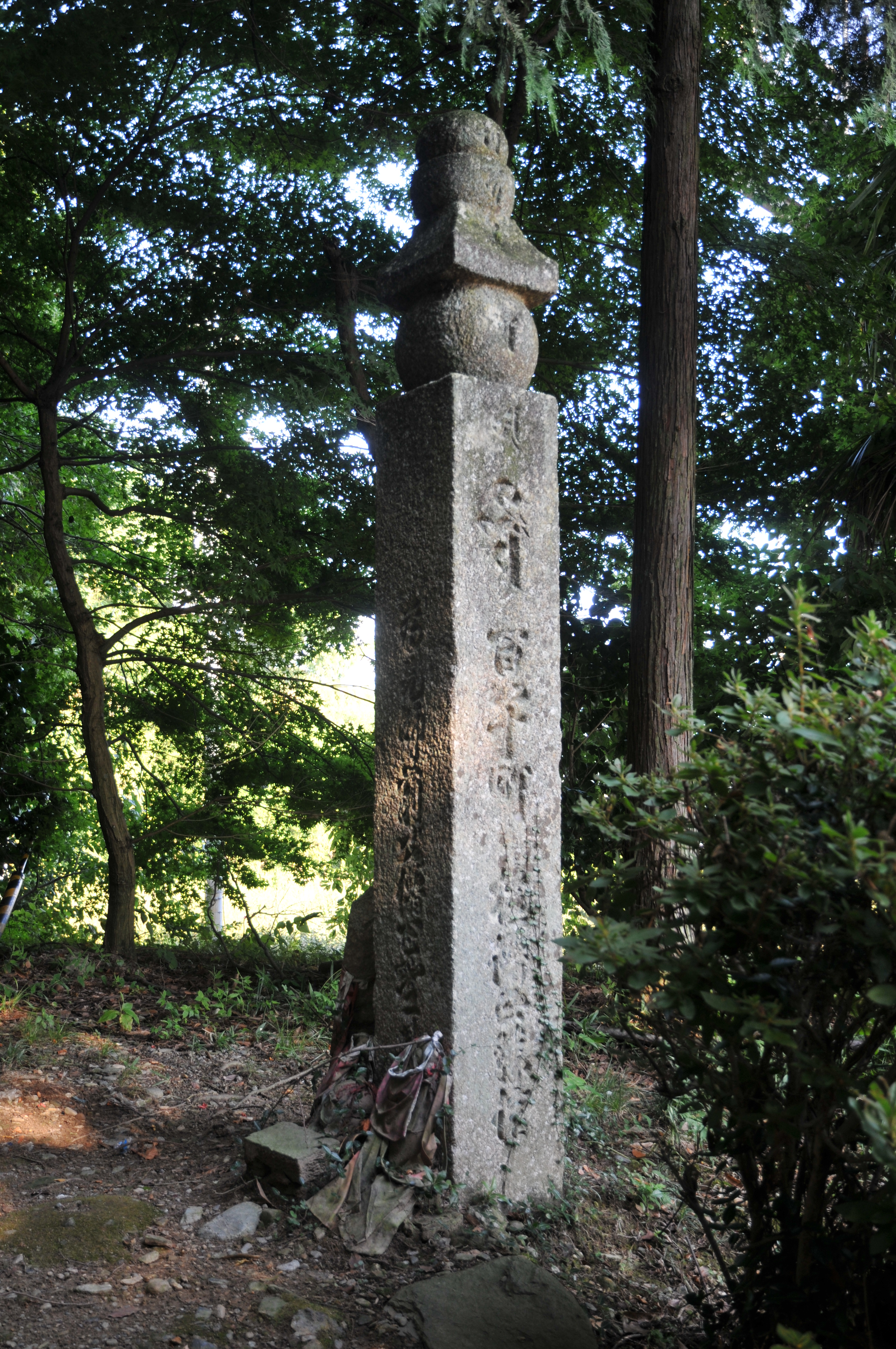
- Chōishi No. 120

- Location within Wakayama Prefecture Location within Japan
- Type: Pilgrimage route
- Periods: Kamakura period
- Location: Kudoyama to Mount Kōya, Wakayama Prefecture, Japan
- Region: Kansai region

History
- Built: 1285

Site notes
- Public access: Yes

UNESCO World Heritage Site
- Type: Cultural
- Criteria: ii, iii, iv, vi
- Designated: 2004

Kōyasan chōishi-michi (高野山町石道) is a pilgrimage route on the Kii Peninsula in the Kansai region of Japan. It begins at the Jison-in temple in the town of Kudoyama on the south bank of the Kinokawa River and extends twenty-four kilometres to Mount Kōya, or Kongōbu-ji Temple, the ecclesiastical headquarters of the Kōyasan sect of Shingon Buddhism in the town of Kōya. The path is a National Historic Site and is also part of the UNESCO World Heritage Site: Sacred Sites and Pilgrimage Routes in the Kii Mountain Range. The area is also within the Kōyasan Chōishi-michi Tamagawa Prefectural Park (高野山町石道玉川峡県立自然公園).

== Route ==
The Kōyasan chōishi-michi is claimed to be the route created by Kūkai when he first established Kongōbu-ji in 819 AD. The name of the route comes from a series of stone guideposts shaped in the form of a stupa with a height of three meters, located at distances of one chō apart, or approximately every 109 meters. A total of 216 of these stone guideposts were placed. Of these, 180 were on the 22 kilometer path from Jison-in to the Danjō Garan, and a further 36 were erected on the further four kilometres to Kūkai's mausoleum in Okunoin Cemetery. In addition, there are four additional markers, one for every 36 chō (corresponding to one ri).

== History ==
The guideposts were originally wooden, and had to be frequently replaced due to exposure to the elements. During the Kamakura period, a priest of Mount Kōya obtained donations from the Imperial Family and a number of leading warlords, and began replacing these wooden markers with granite five-tiered stupas over a 20 year period, with the project completed in 1285. They are engraved with their number in the sequence from Danjō Garan, as well as the seed syllable of one of the divinities in the Taizōkai Mandala, for the first 180, or the Kongōkai Mandala, for the remainder, along with the name of the donor, the date, and the votive purpose of the donor. Of the original 216 guideposts, 179 remain in situ.

== Gallery ==
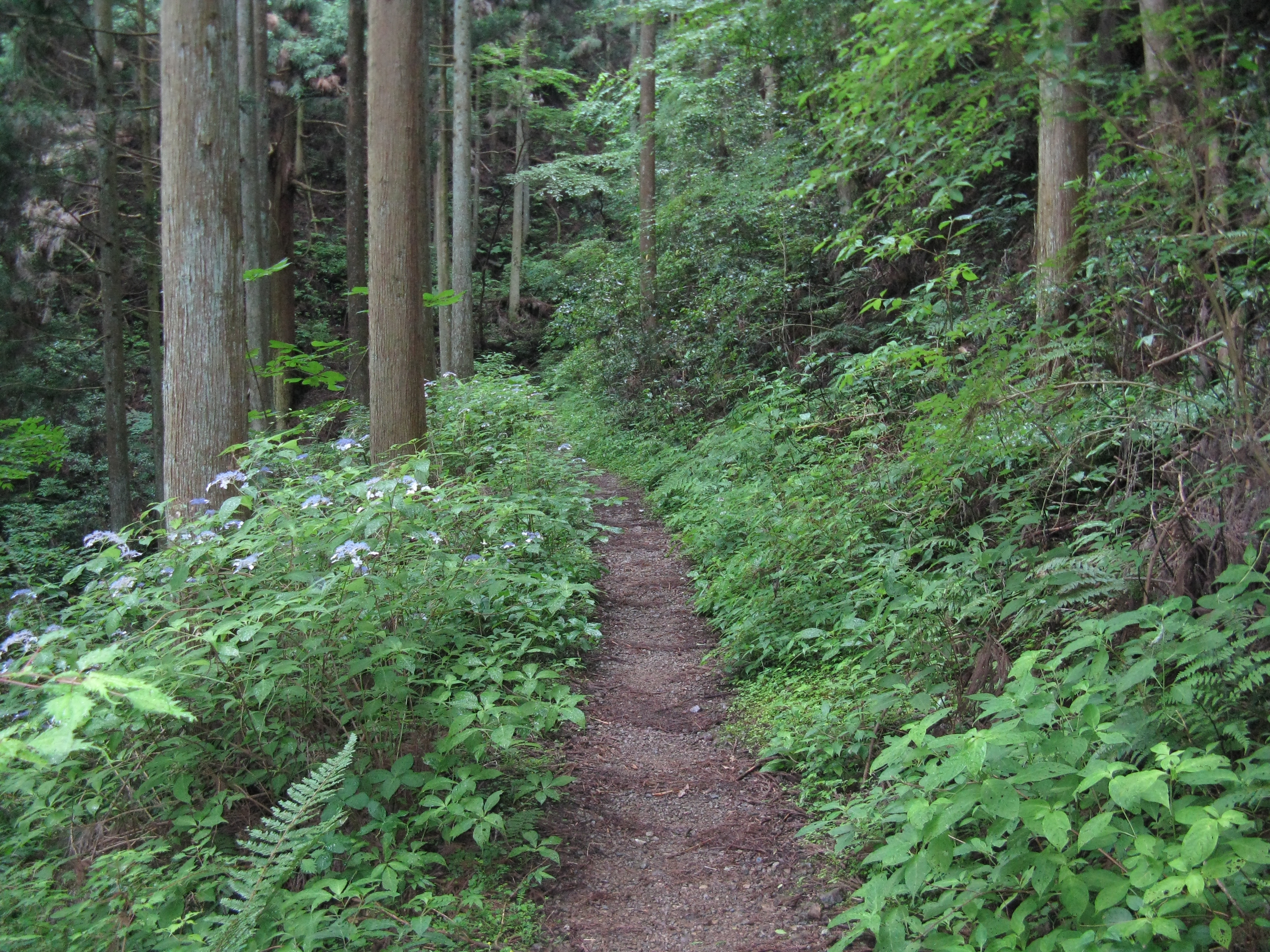
Kōyasan chōishi-michi

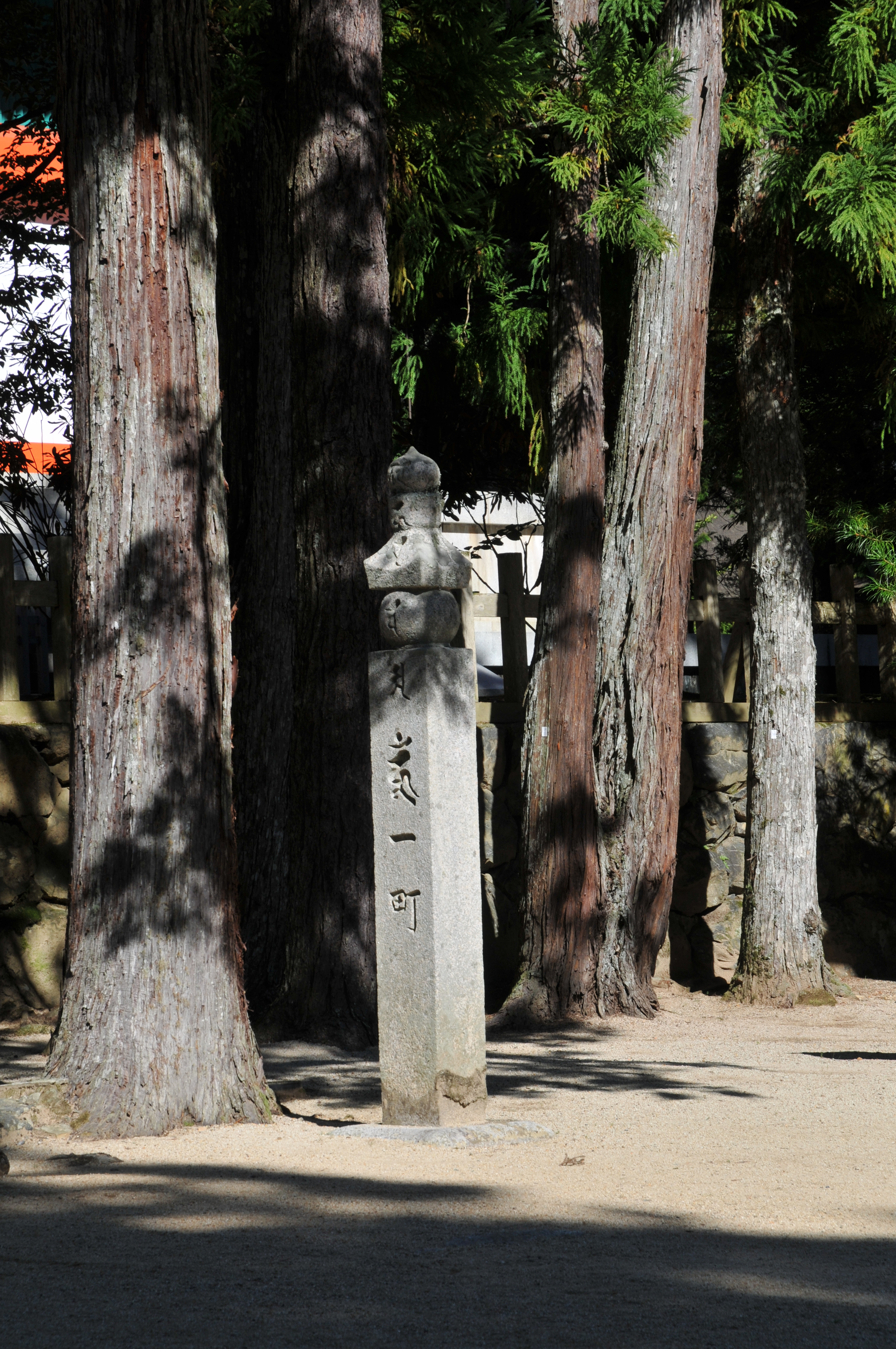
Chōishi No.1

== See also ==
- List of Historic Sites of Japan (Wakayama)
- Kumano Kodō
- Sacred Sites and Pilgrimage Routes in the Kii Mountain Range
- The 100 Views of Nature in Kansai
