= Nankai Cable Line =

Funicular line in Wakayama Prefecture, Japan

Cable Line
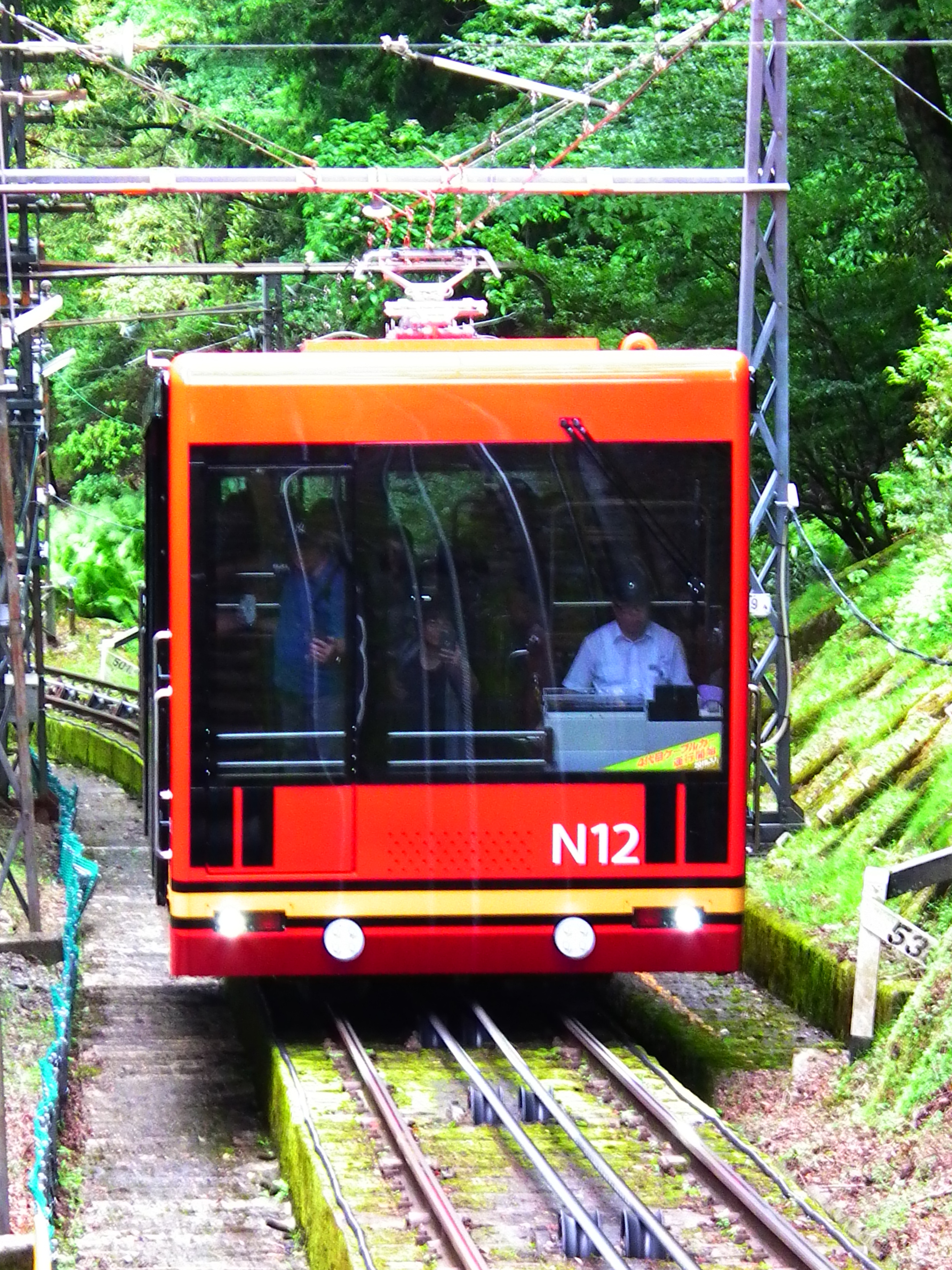
- Kōyasan Cable funicular

Overview
- Native name: 鋼索線
- Owner: Nankai Electric Railway
- Locale: Wakayama Prefecture
- Termini: Gokurakubashi; Kōyasan
- Stations: 2

Service
- Type: Cable car; Funicular
- Services: 1
- Rolling stock: N11+N12, N21+N22

History
- Opened: 29 June 1930

Technical
- Line length: 0.8 km (0.50 mi)
- Number of tracks: Single
- Track gauge: 1,067 mm (3 ft 6 in)
- Operating speed: 3 m/s (5 mph)

The Kōyasan Cable (高野山ケーブル, Kōyasan Kēburu), officially the Cable Line (鋼索線, Kōsaku-sen), is a Japanese funicular line in Kōya, Wakayama, operated by Nankai Electric Railway. The line opened in 1930 as a route to Mount Kōya, a famous Buddhist spot.

== History ==
The operation permit of the Cable line was given to Takanozan Tozan Funicular Railway in 1924, which renamed to Takanozan Electric Railway in 1925. The line opened on 29 June 1930.

In 2019, the line was upgraded to use the modern Nankai 10-20 Series cars.

== Stations ==
Number	Station	Japanese	Distance (km)	Transfers	Location	
NK86	Gokurakubashi	極楽橋	0.0	Koya Line (NK86)	Kōya, Ito District	Wakayama; Prefecture
NK87	Kōyasan	高野山	0.8		Kōya, Ito District	Wakayama; Prefecture

== See also ==
- List of funicular railways
- List of railway lines in Japan
