= Mount Kōya =

Large settlement in Wakayama Prefecture, Japan

UNESCO World Heritage Site
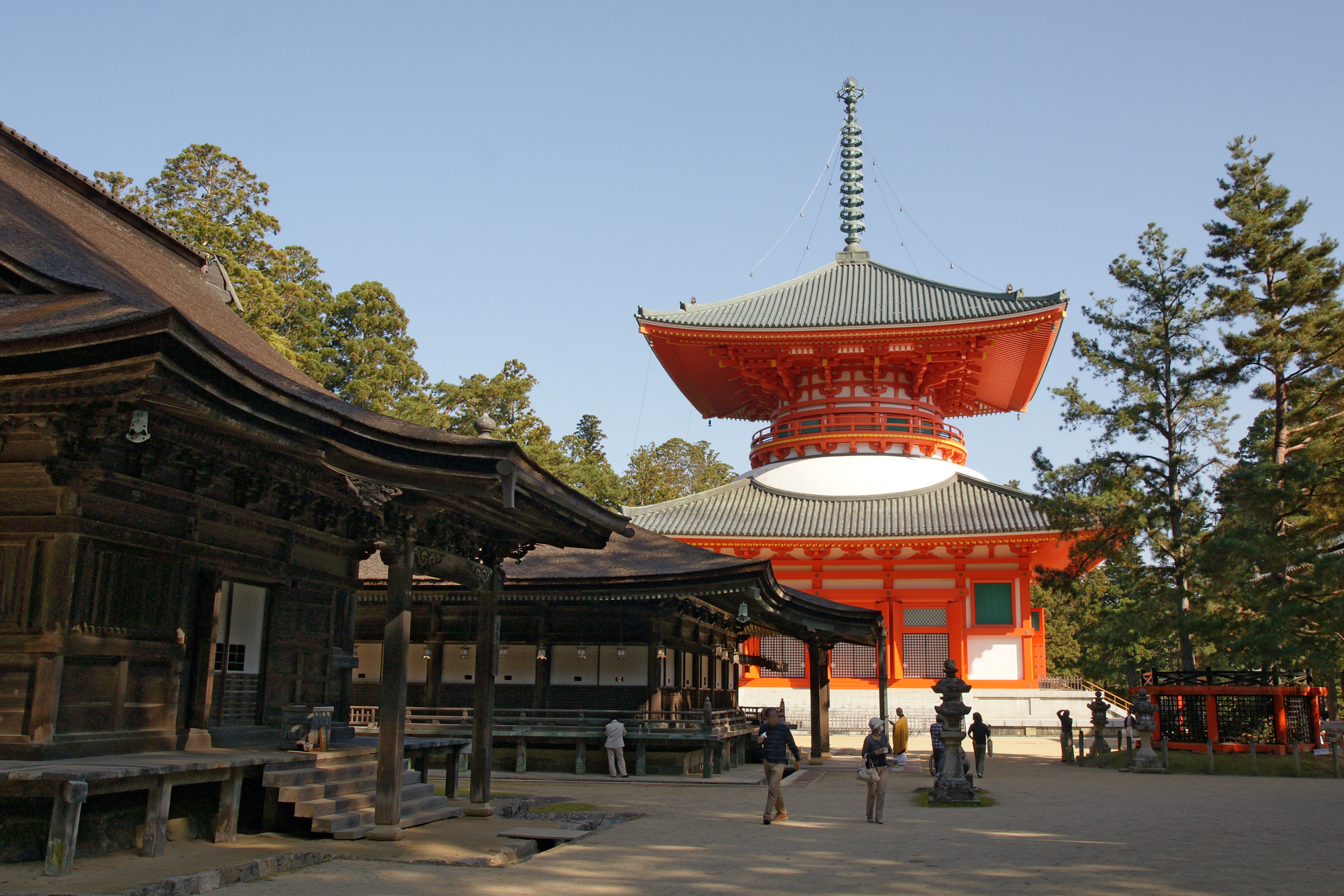
- Danjogaran, the central point of Mount Kōya

- Location within Japan
- Location: Wakayama Prefecture, Japan
- Part of: Sacred Sites and Pilgrimage Routes in the Kii Mountain Range
- Criteria: Cultural: ii, iii, iv, vi
- Reference: 1142
- Inscription: 2004 (28th Session)
- Coordinates: 34°12′45″N 135°35′11″E

Mount Kōya (高野山, Kōya-san) is a large temple settlement in Wakayama Prefecture, Japan to the south of Osaka. In the strictest sense, Mount Kōya is the mountain name (sangō) of Kongōbu-ji Temple, the ecclesiastical headquarters of the Kōyasan sect of Shingon Buddhism.

== History ==
First settled in 819 by the monk Kūkai, Mount Kōya is primarily known as the world headquarters of the Kōyasan Shingon sect of Japanese Buddhism. Located on an 800-meter-high plain amid eight peaks of the mountain, which was the reason this location was selected, in that the terrain is supposed to resemble a lotus plant, the original monastery has grown into the town of Kōya.

Koya features a university dedicated to religious studies and 120 sub-temples, many of which offer lodging to pilgrims. Mount Kōya is also a common starting point to the Shikoku Pilgrimage (四国遍路, Shikoku Henro) associated with Kūkai.

== Sites ==
The mountain is home to the following famous sites:

- Kongōbu-ji (金剛峯寺), the head temple of the Kōyasan Shingon Buddhism. Located roughly in the middle of the sanctuary, Kongobuji is colloquially known as "Kōyasan-Issan", literally meaning "the mountain of Kōya". The temple was built by the warlord Toyotomi Hideyoshi for the benefit of his mother when she died. Originally named Seigan-ji, it was later renamed Kongōbu-ji in the Meiji Era.
- Danjogaran (壇上伽藍), at the heartland of the Mount Kōya settlement. Garan is a name for an area that has the main sacred buildings: a main hall, several pagodas, a scripture storage, a bell tower, a lecture hall, and other halls dedicated to important deities. There is also a shrine dedicated to the Shintō gods of that mountain area and in front of it an assembly hall (Sannō-dō). Danjō Garan is one of the two sacred spots around Mount Kōya.
- Konpon Daitō (根本大塔), the "Basic Great Pagoda" that according to Shingon Buddhist doctrine represents the central point of a mandala covering all of Japan. Standing at 48.5 meters tall and situated right in the middle of Kōyasan, this pagoda was built as a seminary for the esoteric practices of Shingon Buddhism. This pagoda and the Okunoin Temple form a large sanctuary.
- Sannō-dō (山王堂), an assembly hall for special ceremonies dedicated to the Shintō gods guarding the area.
- Okunoin (奥の院), the mausoleum of Kūkai, surrounded by an immense graveyard (the largest in Japan). Kūkai's spirit is considered to be alive and is treated as a living deity who is attended to daily by Buddhist priests.
- Kōyasan chōishi-michi (高野山町石道), the traditional route up the mountain with stone markers (ishi) every 109 meters (chō).
- Daimon (大門), the main gate for Mount Kōya. This mammoth gate stands as the main entrance to Kōyasan. It is flanked on each side by Kongō warriors who guard the mountain.
- Tokugawa Family Tomb. This mausoleum was built by the third shōgun Iemitsu Tokugawa. It took ten years to build and is architecturally representative of the Edo Period. First Edo shōgun Ieyasu is enshrined on the right and the second shōgun Hidetada on the left. The structure is decorated with carvings and brass fittings.
- It also houses a replica of the Nestorian stele.

In 2004, UNESCO designated Kongōbu-ji on Mount Kōya, as part of the World Heritage Site "Sacred Sites and Pilgrimage Routes in the Kii Mountain Range". Kōya Sankeimichi, the traditional pilgrimage route to Mount Kōya, was also inscribed as part of the World Heritage Site.

The complex includes a memorial hall and cemetery honoring Japanese who were imprisoned or executed for committing atrocities during World War II. Within the cemetery are several memorials valorizing the brutal wartime aggression of Japan in East Asia.

== Access ==
Kōya-san is accessible primarily by the Nankai Electric Railway from Namba Station (in Osaka) to Gokurakubashi Station at the base of the mountain. A cable car from Gokurakubashi ("Paradise Bridge") then transports visitors to the top in five minutes. The entire trip takes about 1.5 hours on an express train or two hours by non-express.

Local automobile traffic can be very heavy on weekends but lighter on weekdays. Many Buddhist monasteries on the mountain function as hotels for visitors providing traditional accommodation with an evening meal and breakfast. Guest are also invited to participate in the morning services.

=== Buses ===
- There is a bus which runs non-stop from Kansai Airport to Mount Kōya, and it costs 2,000 yen (adult). The bus is operated by Kansai Airport Transportion and Willer Express.
- The Koyasan Marine Liner bus runs from Wakayamakō Station to Okunoin Bus stop on Mount Kōya, and it costs 2250 yen (adult). The bus is operated by Daijū Bus - 大十バス.

== Climate ==
Climate data for Mount Kōya (1991−2020 normals, extremes 1979−present)
Month	Jan	Feb	Mar	Apr	May	Jun	Jul	Aug	Sep	Oct	Nov	Dec	Year
Record high °C (°F)	15.1 (59.2)	17.9 (64.2)	20.3 (68.5)	26.5 (79.7)	29.6 (85.3)	31.2 (88.2)	34.6 (94.3)	33.2 (91.8)	32.2 (90.0)	27.2 (81.0)	22.3 (72.1)	19.7 (67.5)	34.6 (94.3)
Mean daily maximum °C (°F)	3.4 (38.1)	4.8 (40.6)	9.2 (48.6)	15.1 (59.2)	20.1 (68.2)	22.8 (73.0)	26.6 (79.9)	27.8 (82.0)	23.7 (74.7)	17.8 (64.0)	12.2 (54.0)	6.3 (43.3)	15.8 (60.4)
Daily mean °C (°F)	−0.3 (31.5)	0.4 (32.7)	4.0 (39.2)	9.4 (48.9)	14.4 (57.9)	18.1 (64.6)	22.1 (71.8)	22.8 (73.0)	19.1 (66.4)	13.2 (55.8)	7.5 (45.5)	2.2 (36.0)	11.1 (52.0)
Mean daily minimum °C (°F)	−4.0 (24.8)	−3.8 (25.2)	−1.0 (30.2)	3.7 (38.7)	8.9 (48.0)	14.0 (57.2)	18.4 (65.1)	18.8 (65.8)	15.3 (59.5)	9.1 (48.4)	3.0 (37.4)	−1.6 (29.1)	6.8 (44.2)
Record low °C (°F)	−12.8 (9.0)	−13.4 (7.9)	−9.4 (15.1)	−5.1 (22.8)	−1.4 (29.5)	3.4 (38.1)	9.9 (49.8)	11.8 (53.2)	5.0 (41.0)	−1.5 (29.3)	−5.0 (23.0)	−10.0 (14.0)	−13.4 (7.9)
Average precipitation mm (inches)	87.6 (3.45)	97.4 (3.83)	141.7 (5.58)	141.5 (5.57)	166.6 (6.56)	260.3 (10.25)	256.4 (10.09)	192.5 (7.58)	247.5 (9.74)	203.3 (8.00)	108.4 (4.27)	89.3 (3.52)	2,003.1 (78.86)
Average precipitation days (≥ 1.0 mm)	11.7	11.1	12.6	11.2	10.7	13.7	12.7	10.9	11.7	11.2	8.7	11.4	137.6
Mean monthly sunshine hours	82.9	96.7	138.5	176.5	185.5	124.9	146.1	166.8	124.7	130.6	115.6	93.0	1,582.3
Source: Japan Meteorological Agency (1991–2020 averages; extremes from 1979 to present)

== Gallery ==
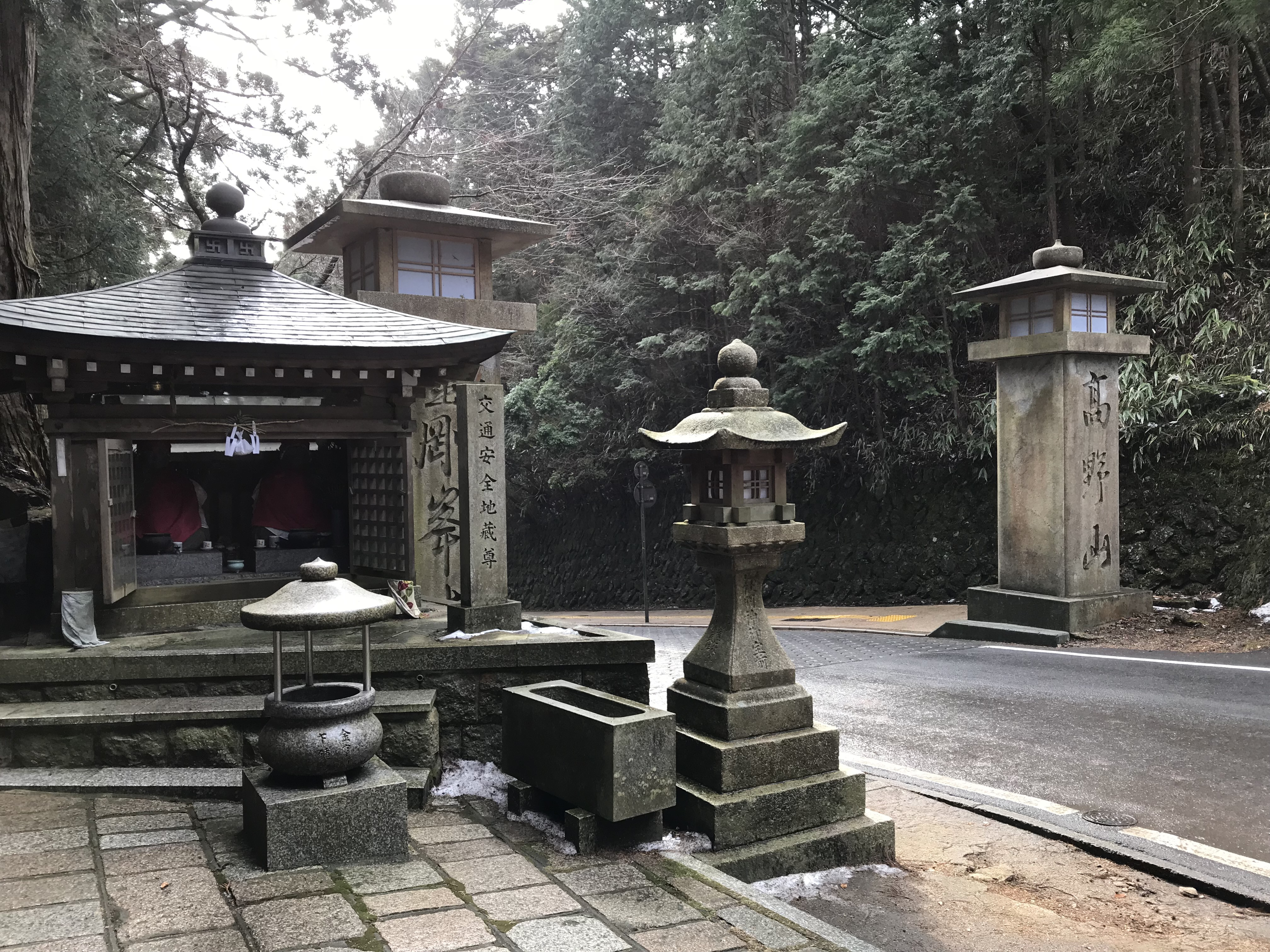
Entrance to Kōya-san with two pillars showing the temple name Kongōbu-ji (Kongōbu Temple) and its mountain name Kōya-san

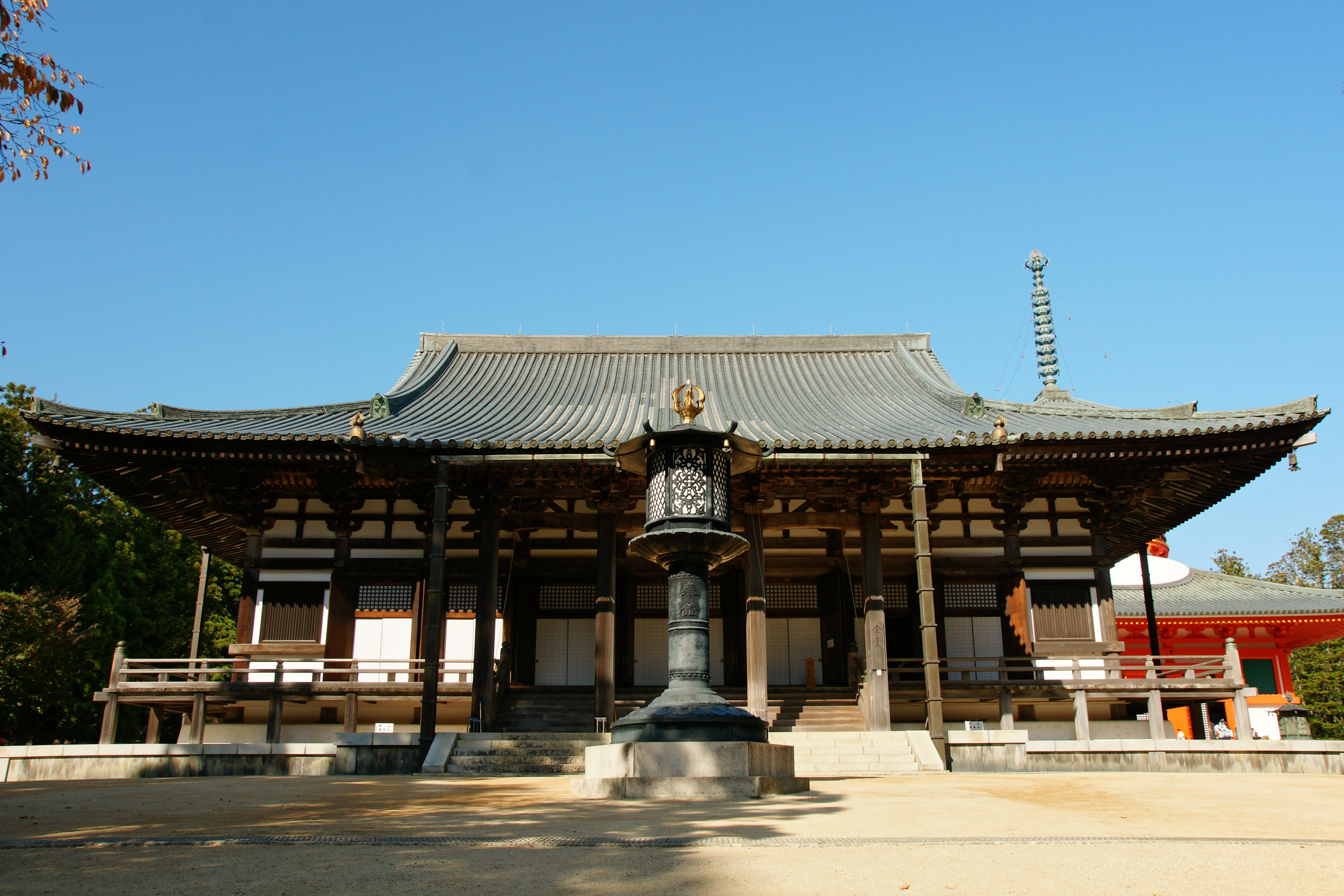
Main Hall (Kondō) of Kongōbu Temple (Danjōgaran)

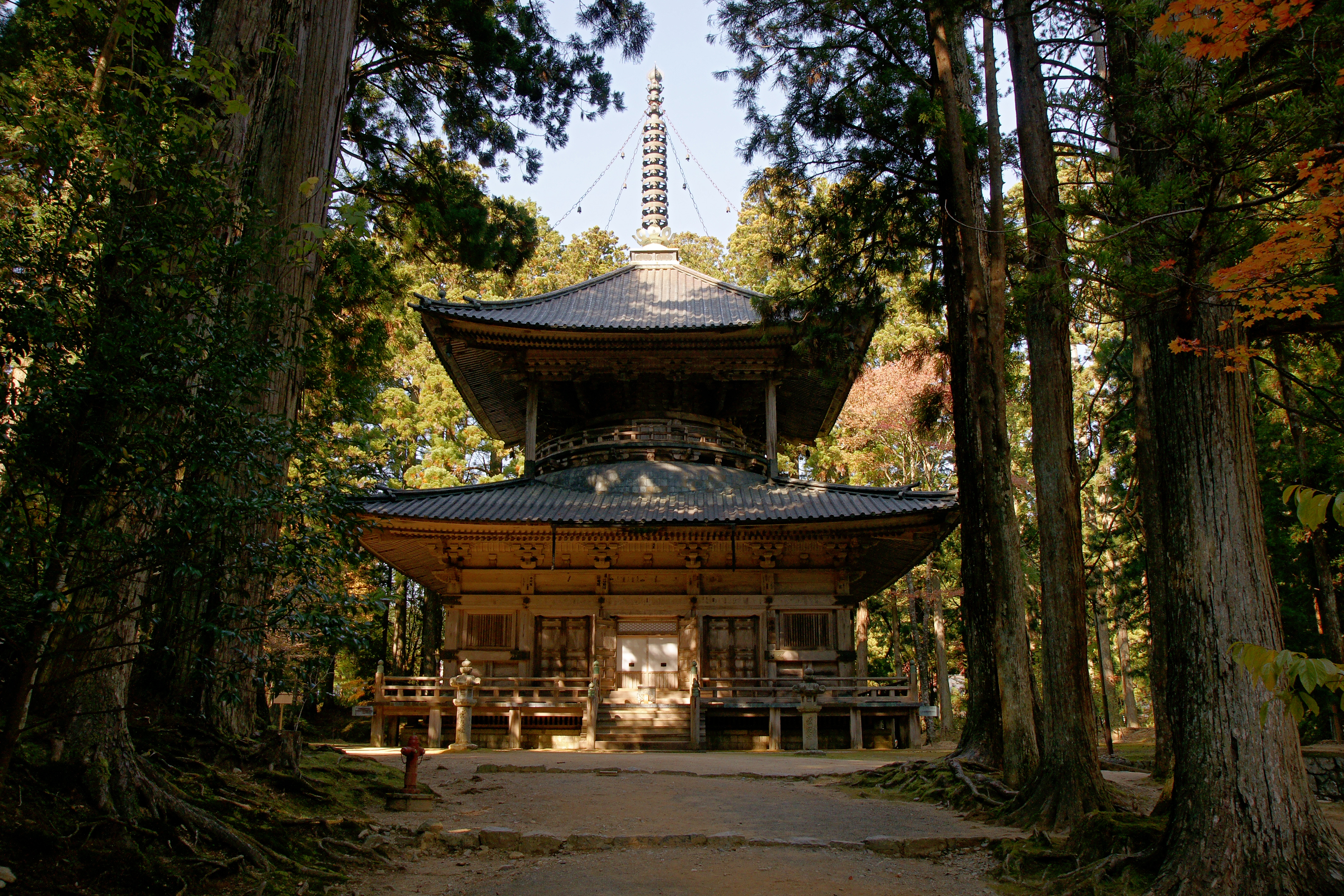
Saitō, West Pagoda (Danjōgaran)

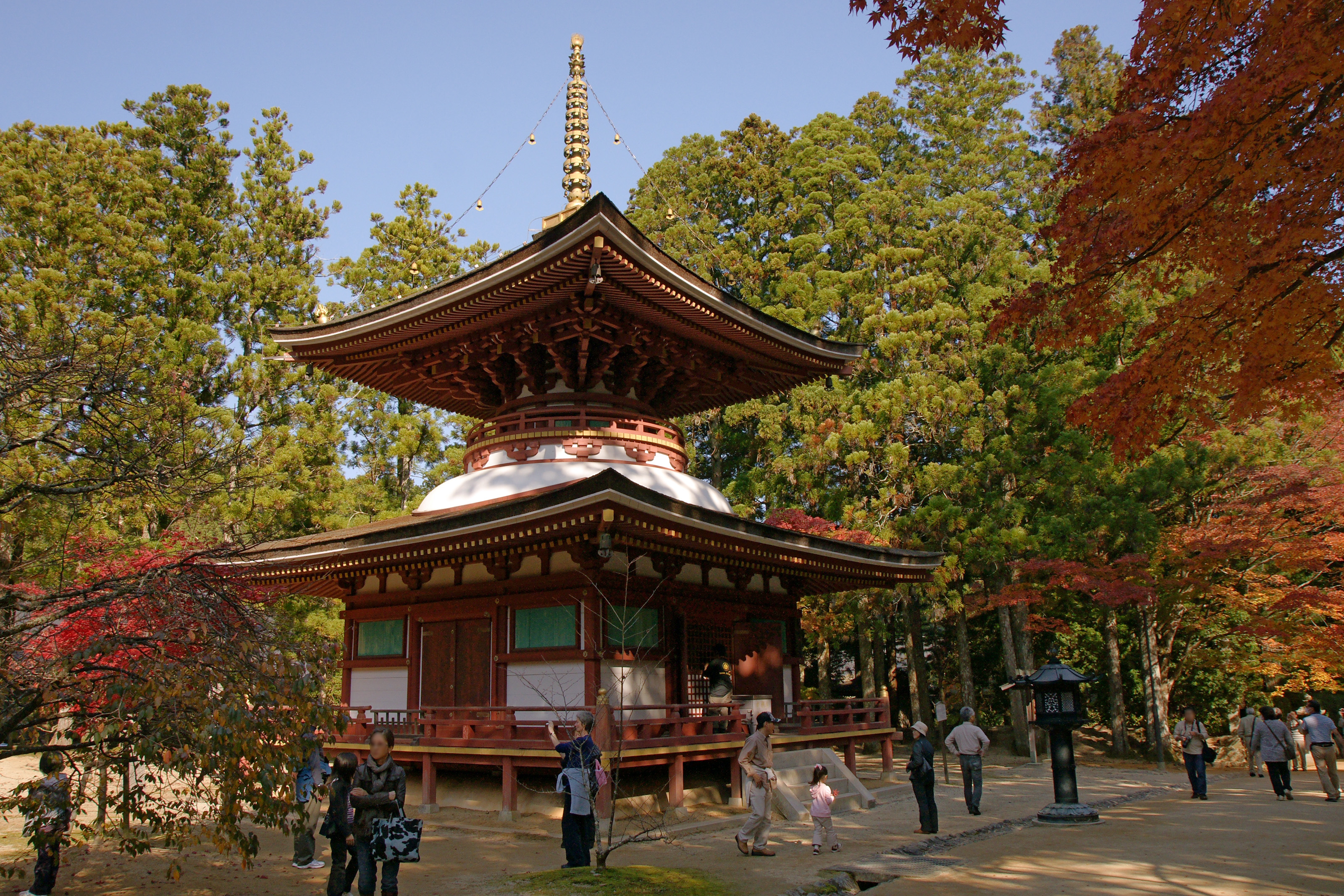
Tōtō, East Pagoda(Danjōgaran)

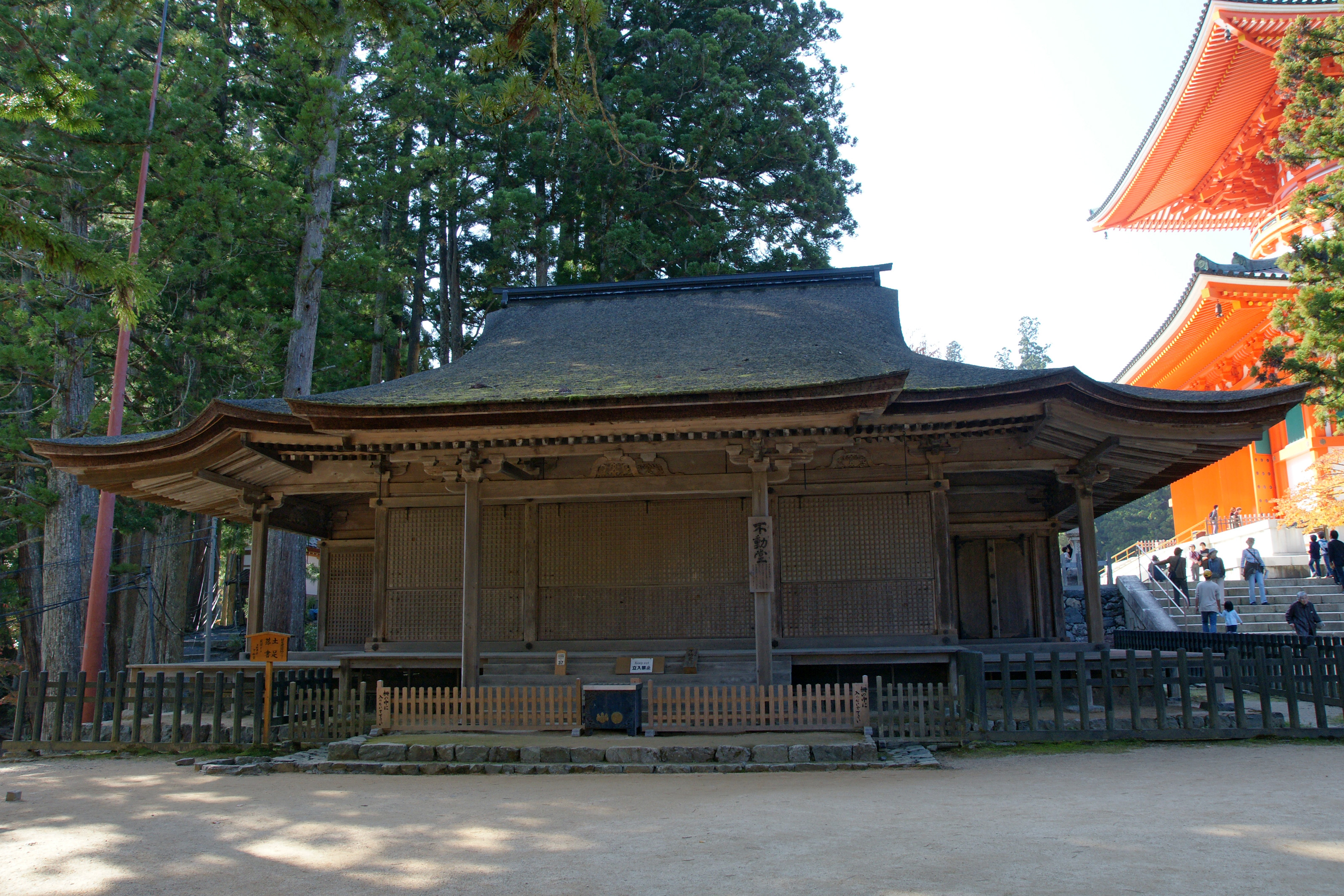
Fudōdo, the hall dedicated to Fudō Myōō (National Treasure)

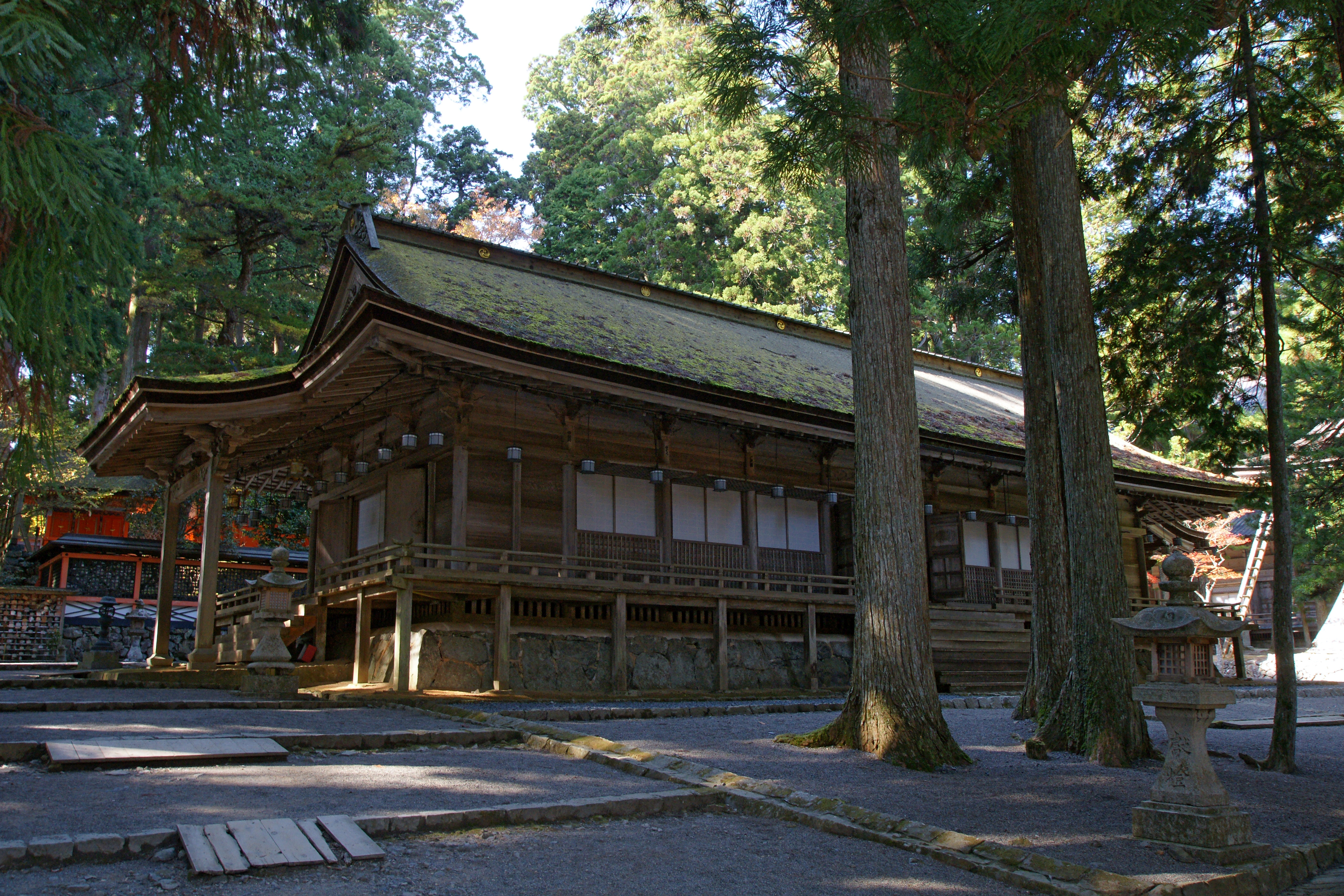
Sanō-in, Hall of the "Mountain King", the local Shintō deity (Danjōgaran)

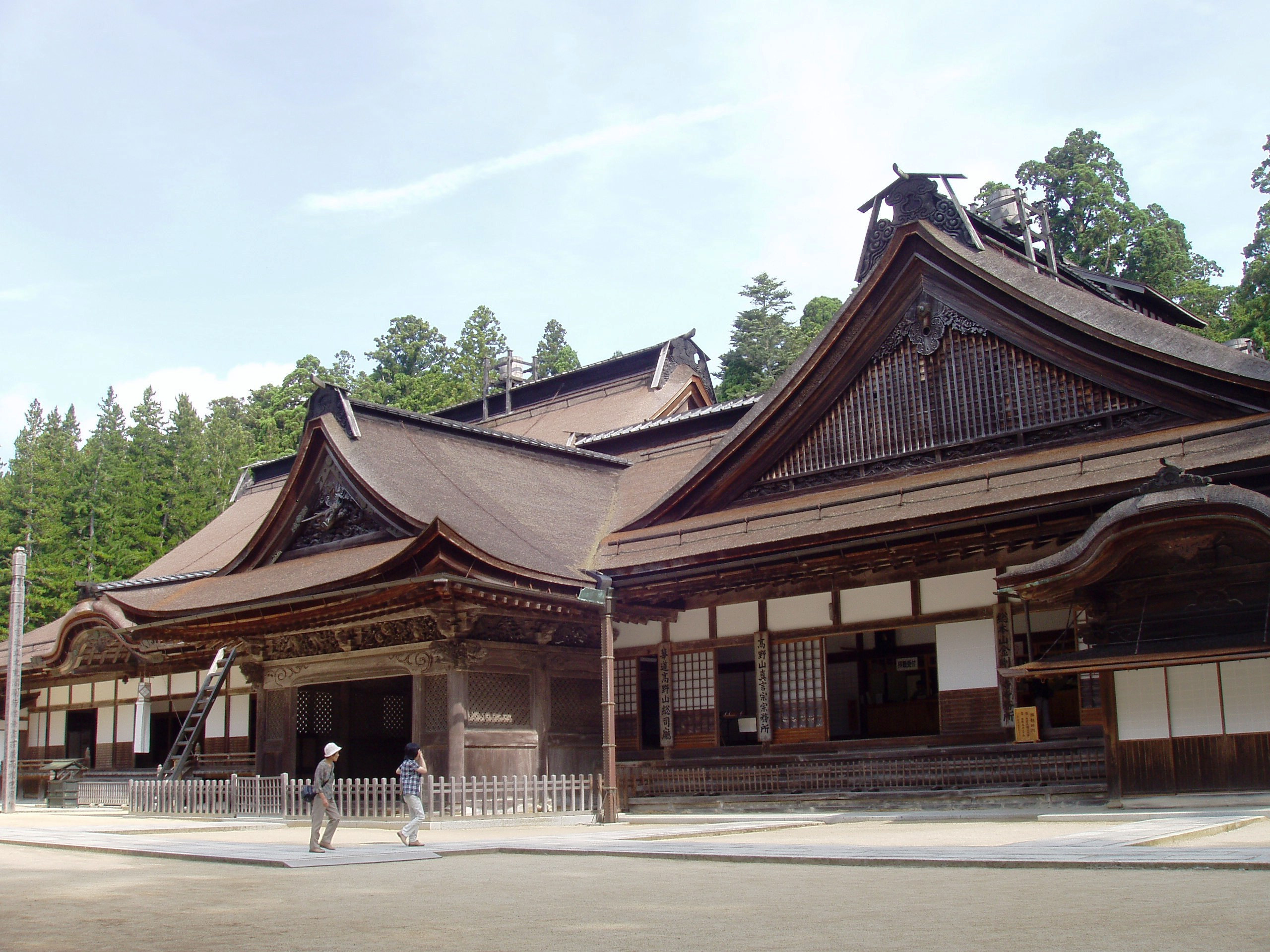
Kongōbu-Temple

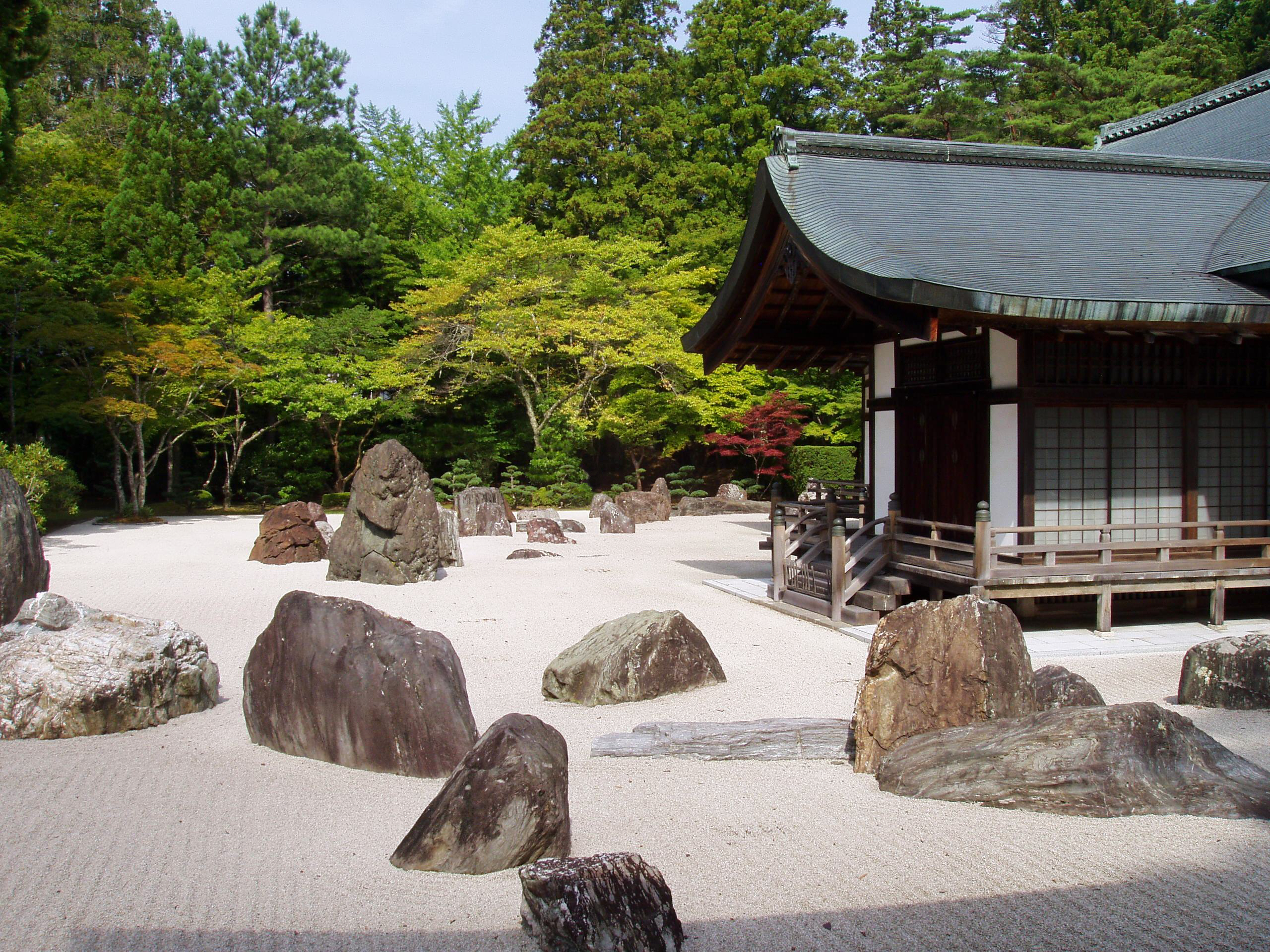
Banryūtei, a rock garden in Kongōbu-Temple

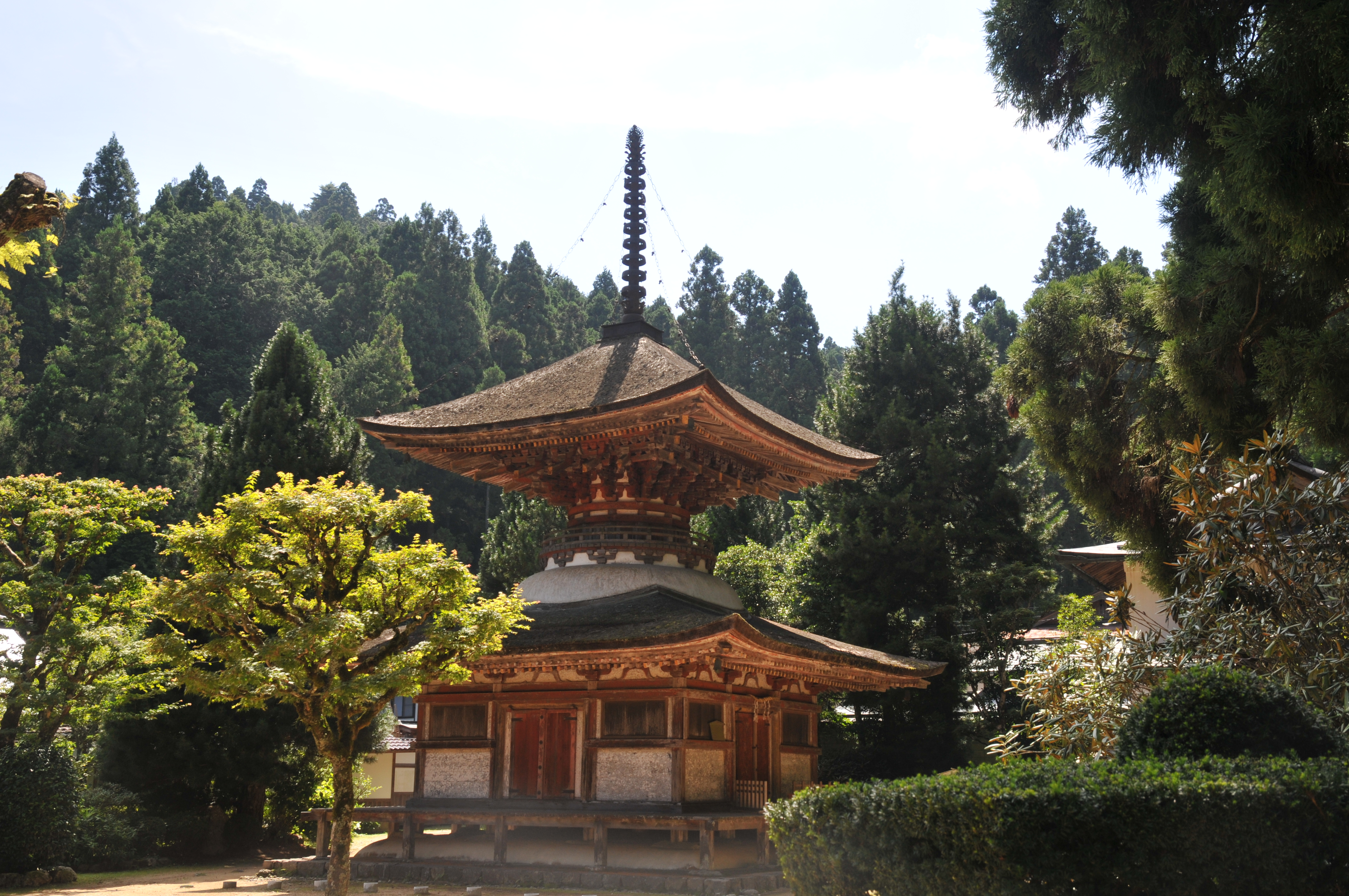
Pagoda of Kongōsanmai-Temple (Kongōsanmai-in), the second oldest "treasure pagoda" in Japan (National Treasure)

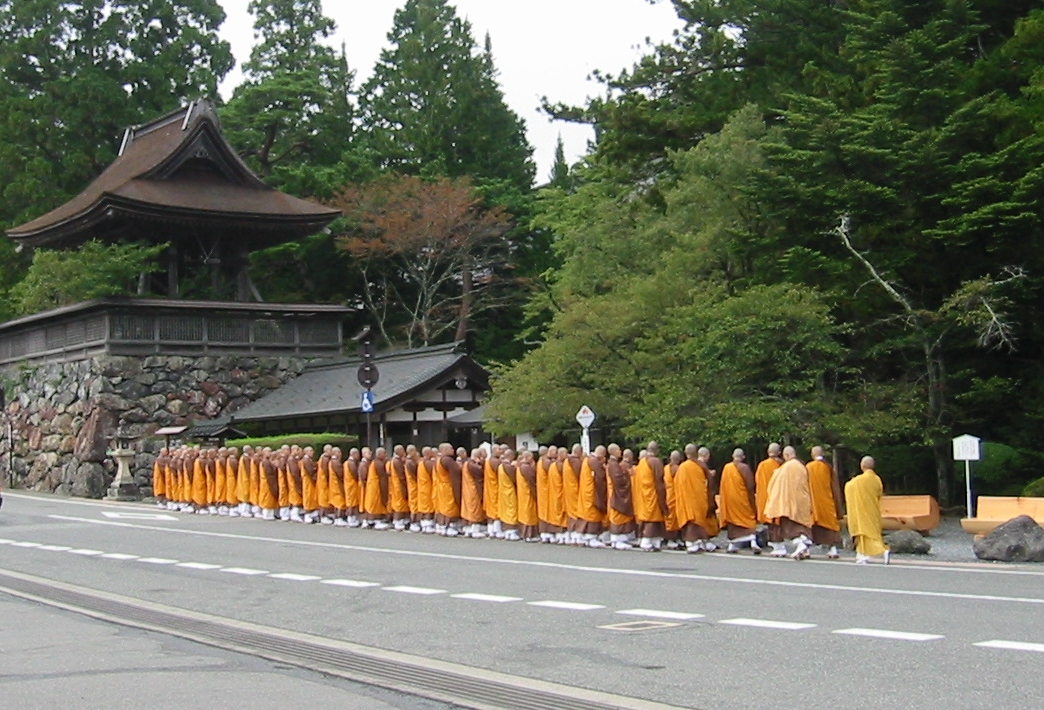
Shingon Buddhist monks, Mount Kōya, 2004

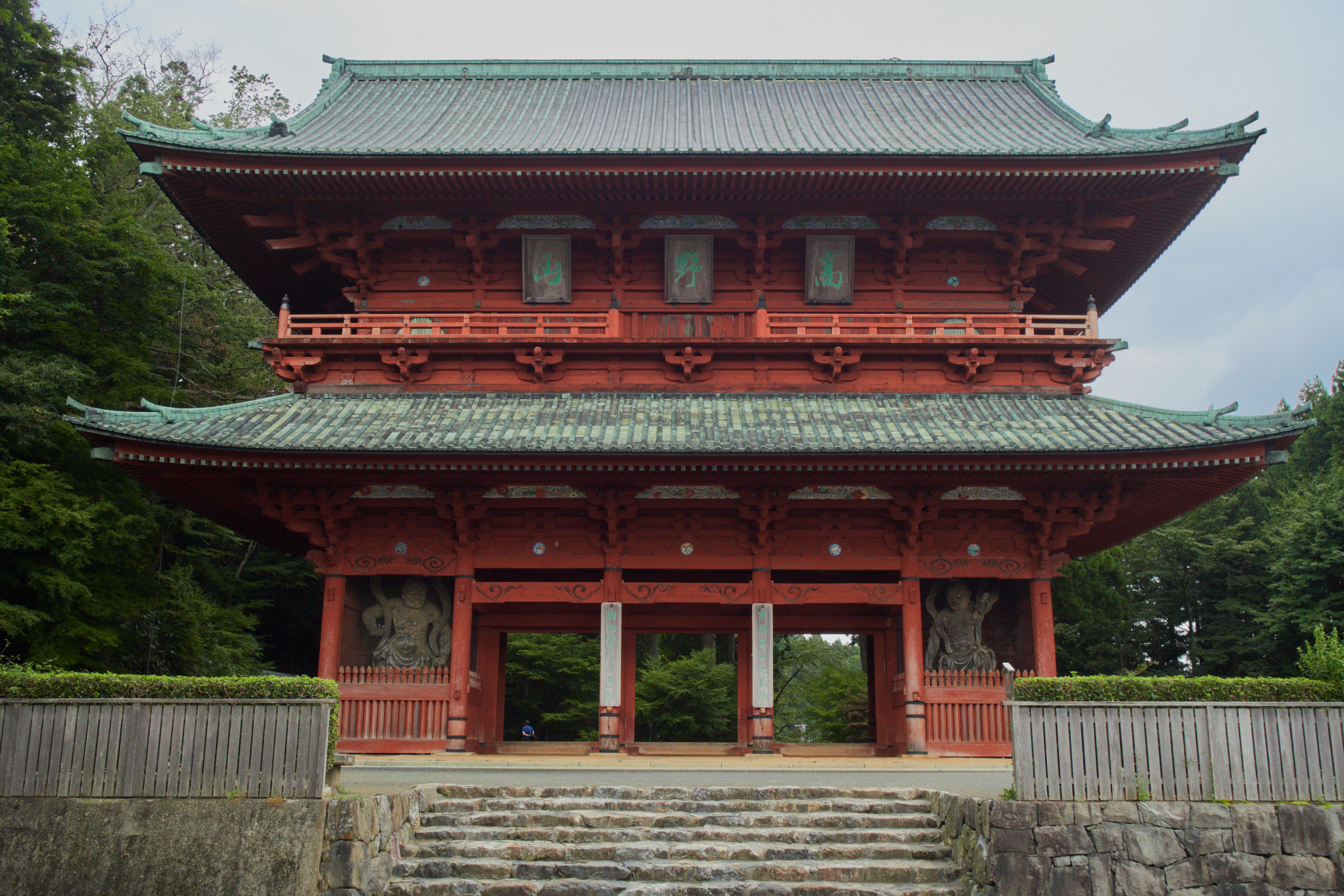
Daimon Gate

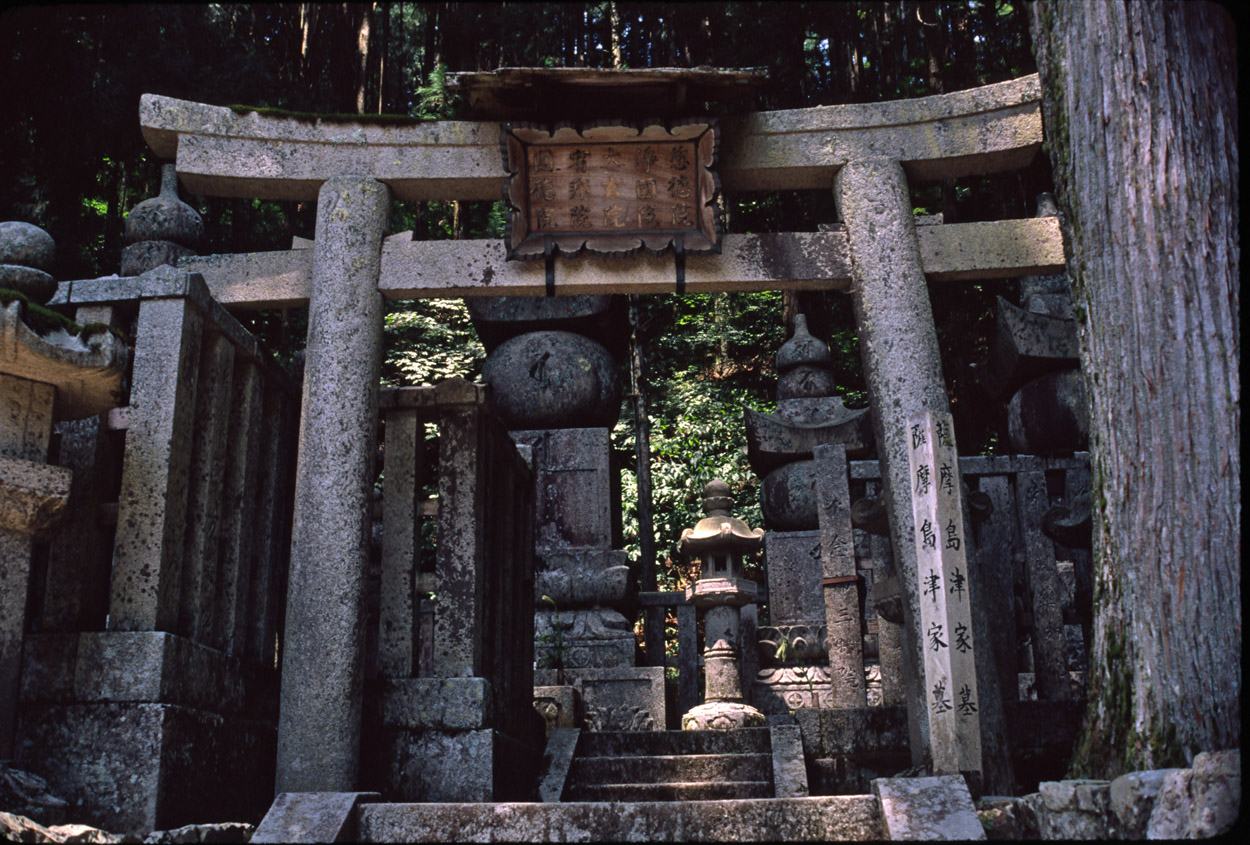
Shimazu clan graves

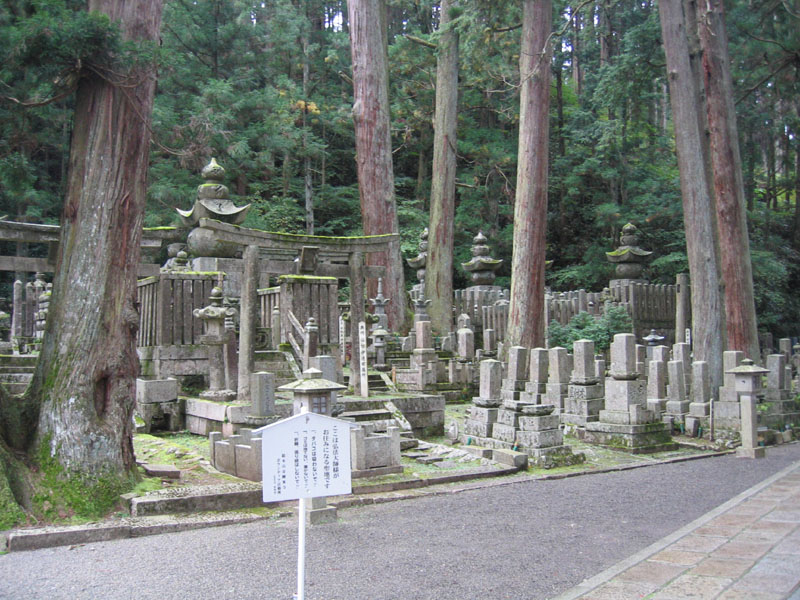
Okunoin Cemetery

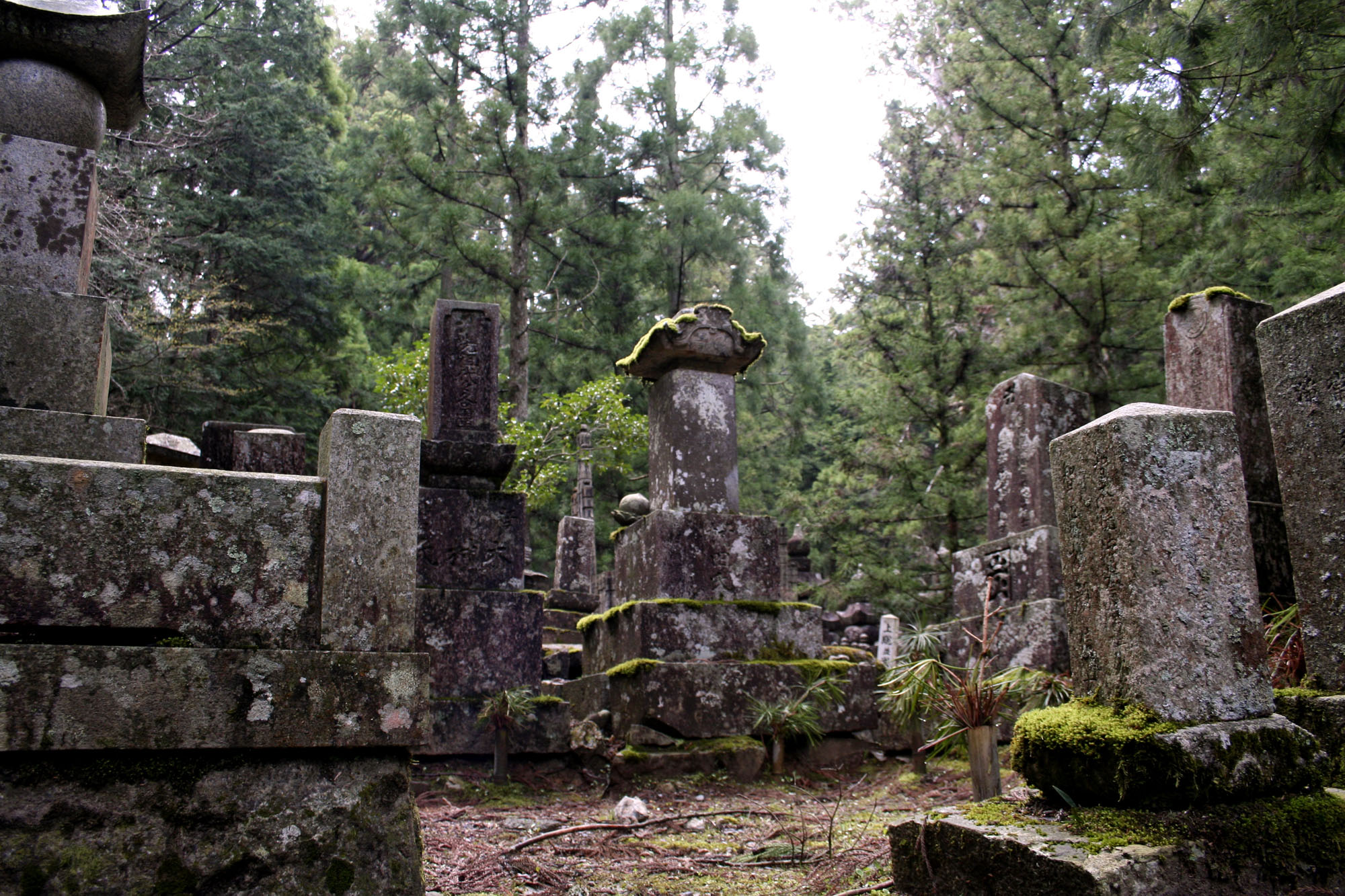
Graves in Okunoin Cemetery

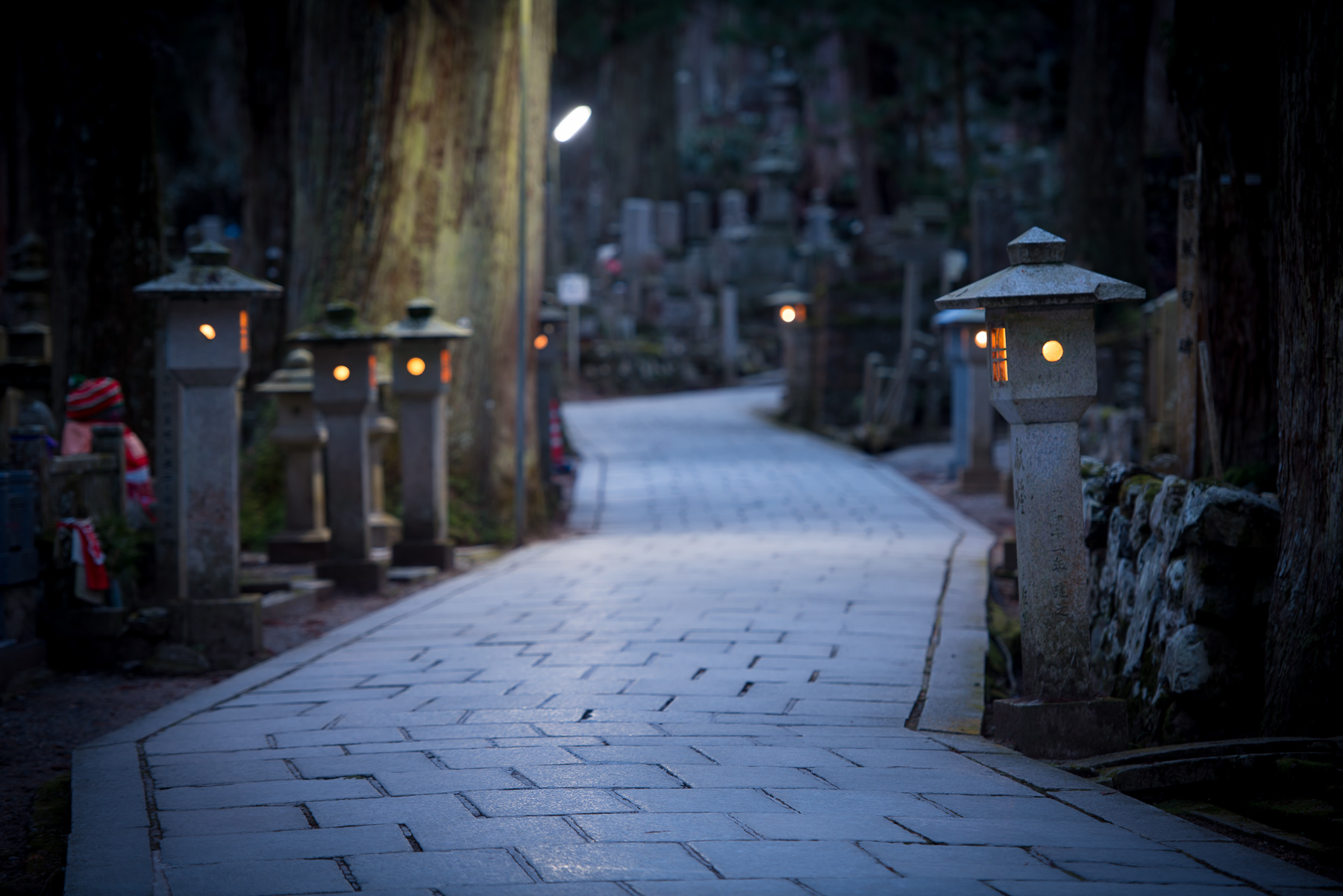
Okunoin Cemetery

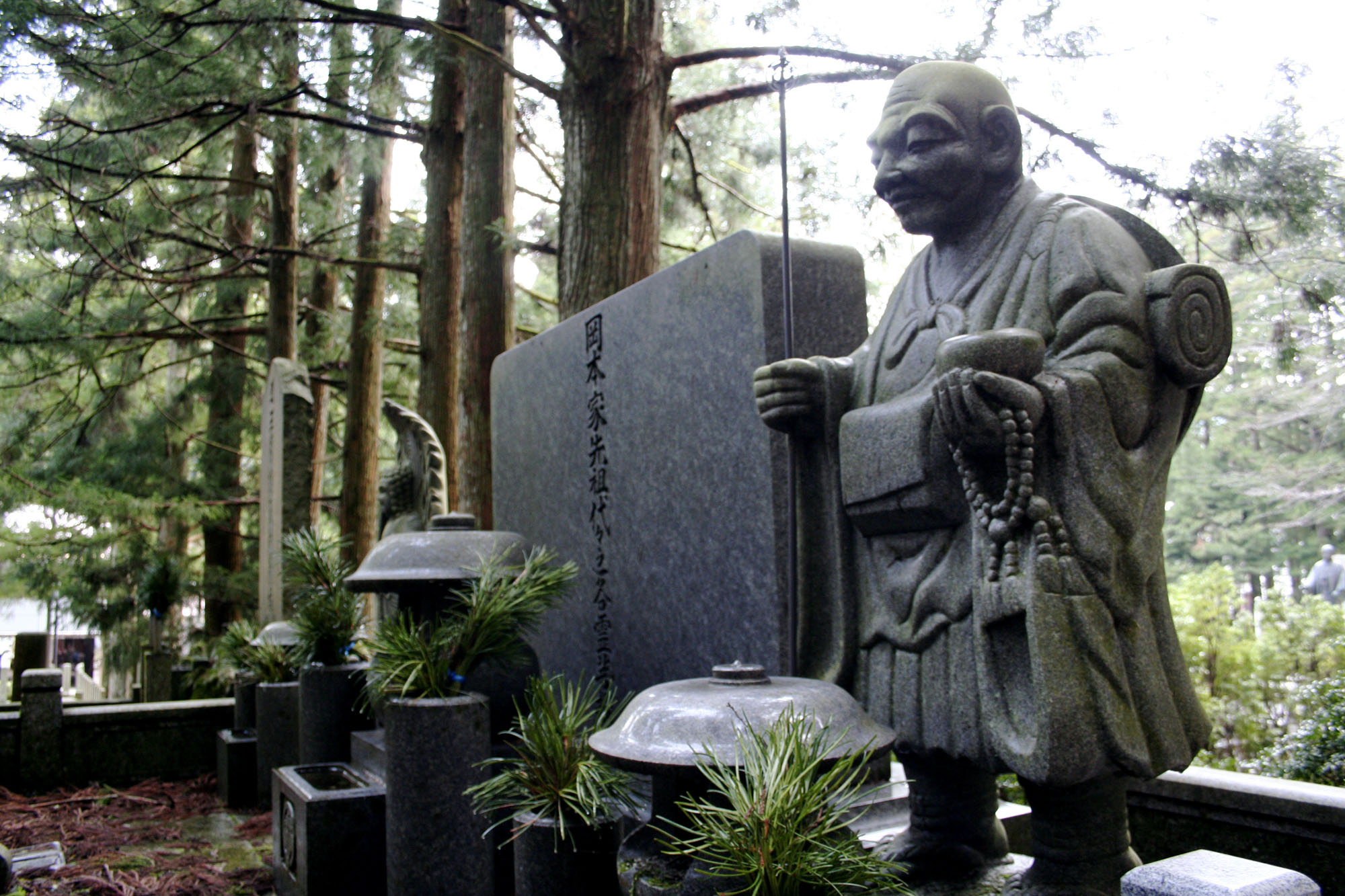
A statue of a deceased pilgrim at his grave site in Okunoin Cemetery

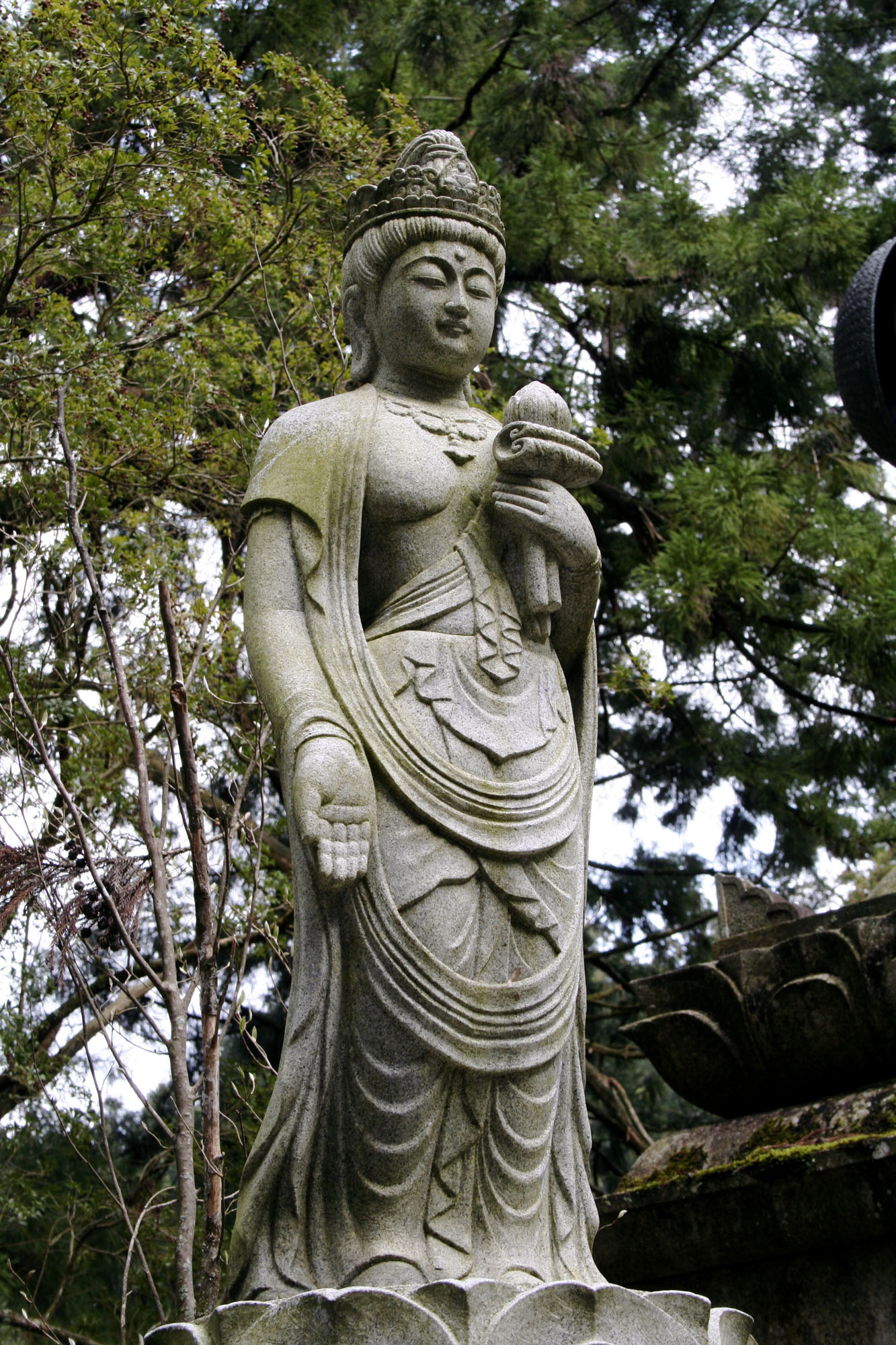
A Kannon-statue in Okunoin Cemetery

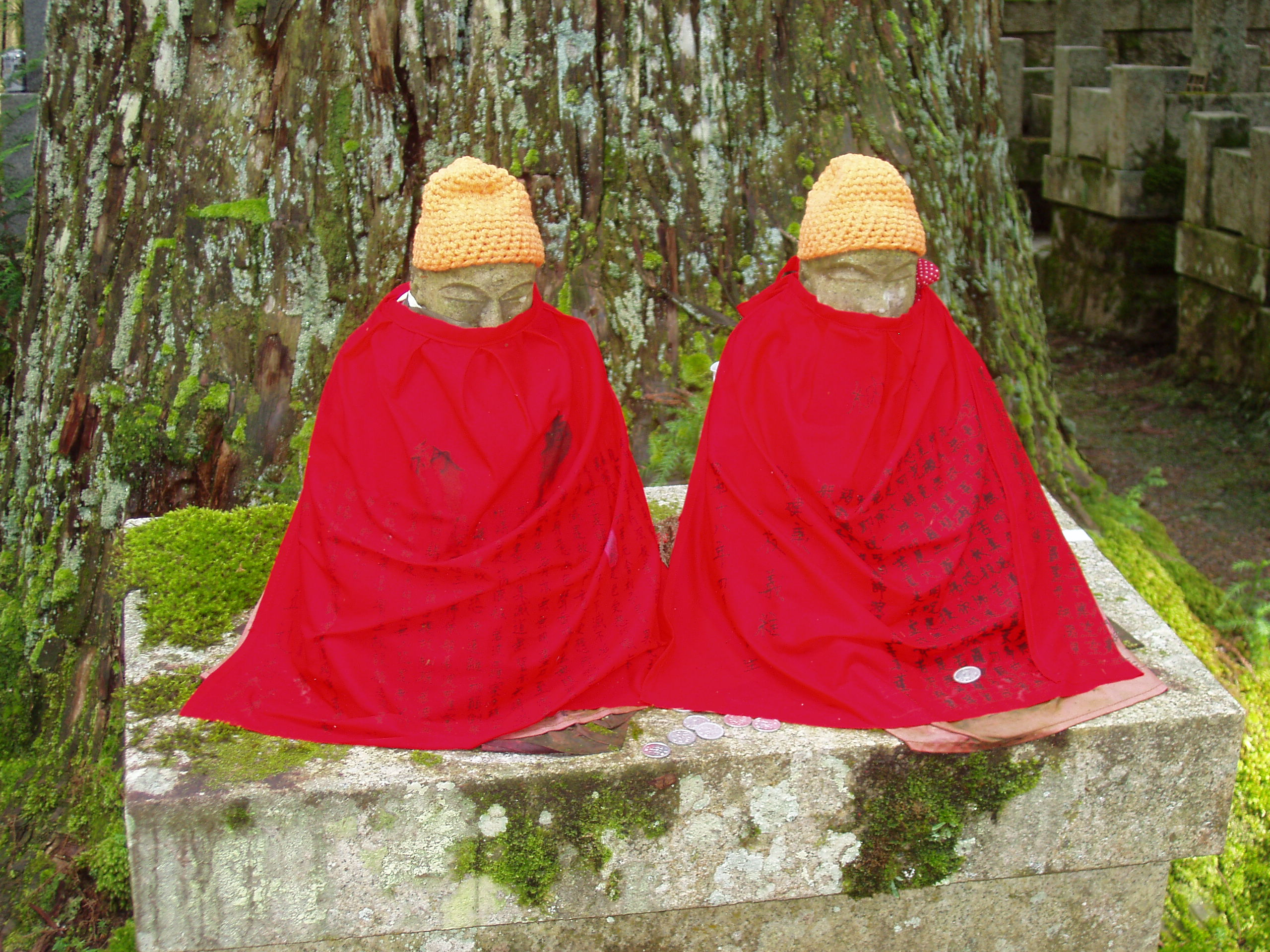
Two Kṣitigarbha-statues (Jizō bosatsu), Okunoin Cemetery

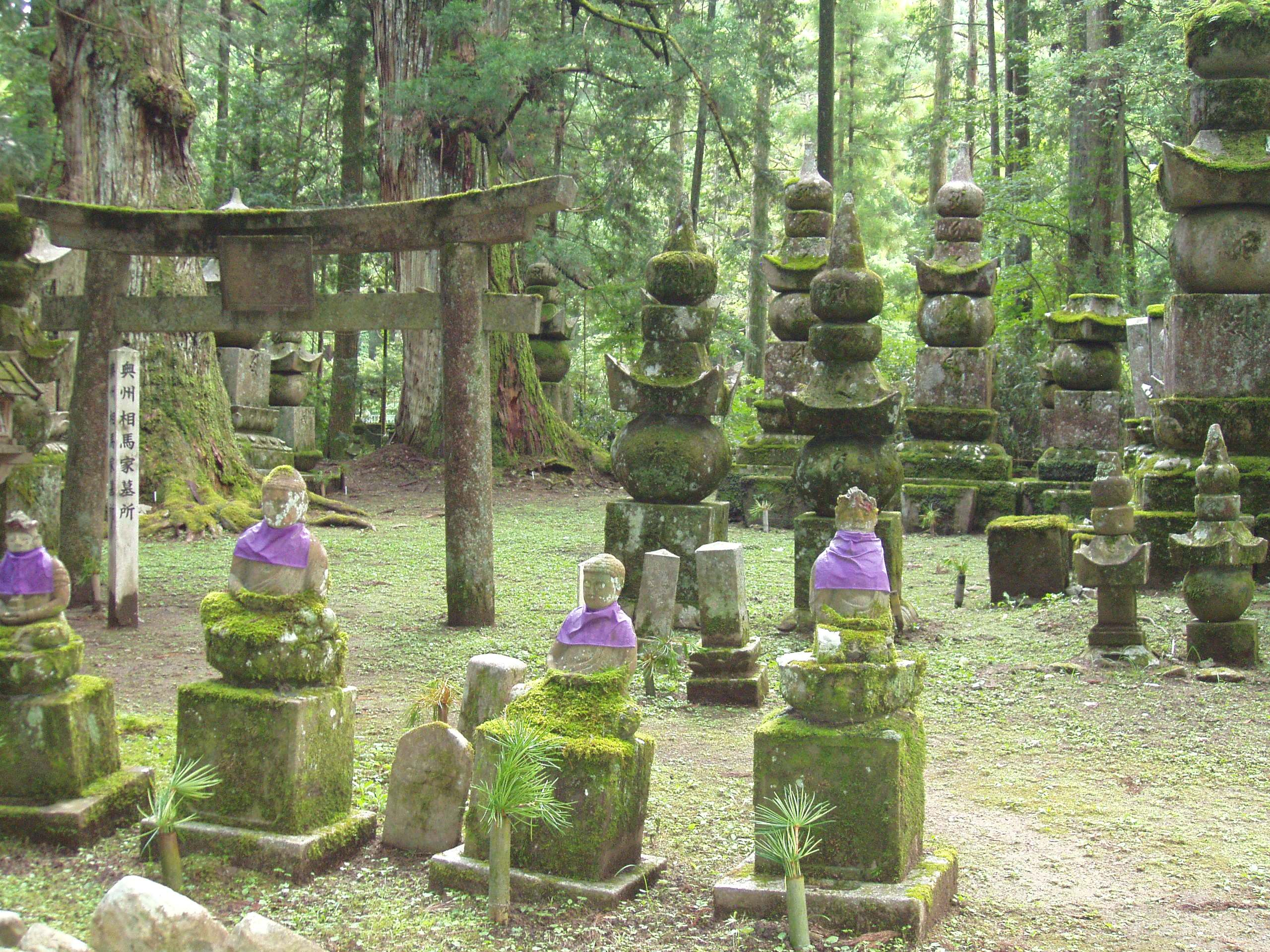
Okunoin Cemetery

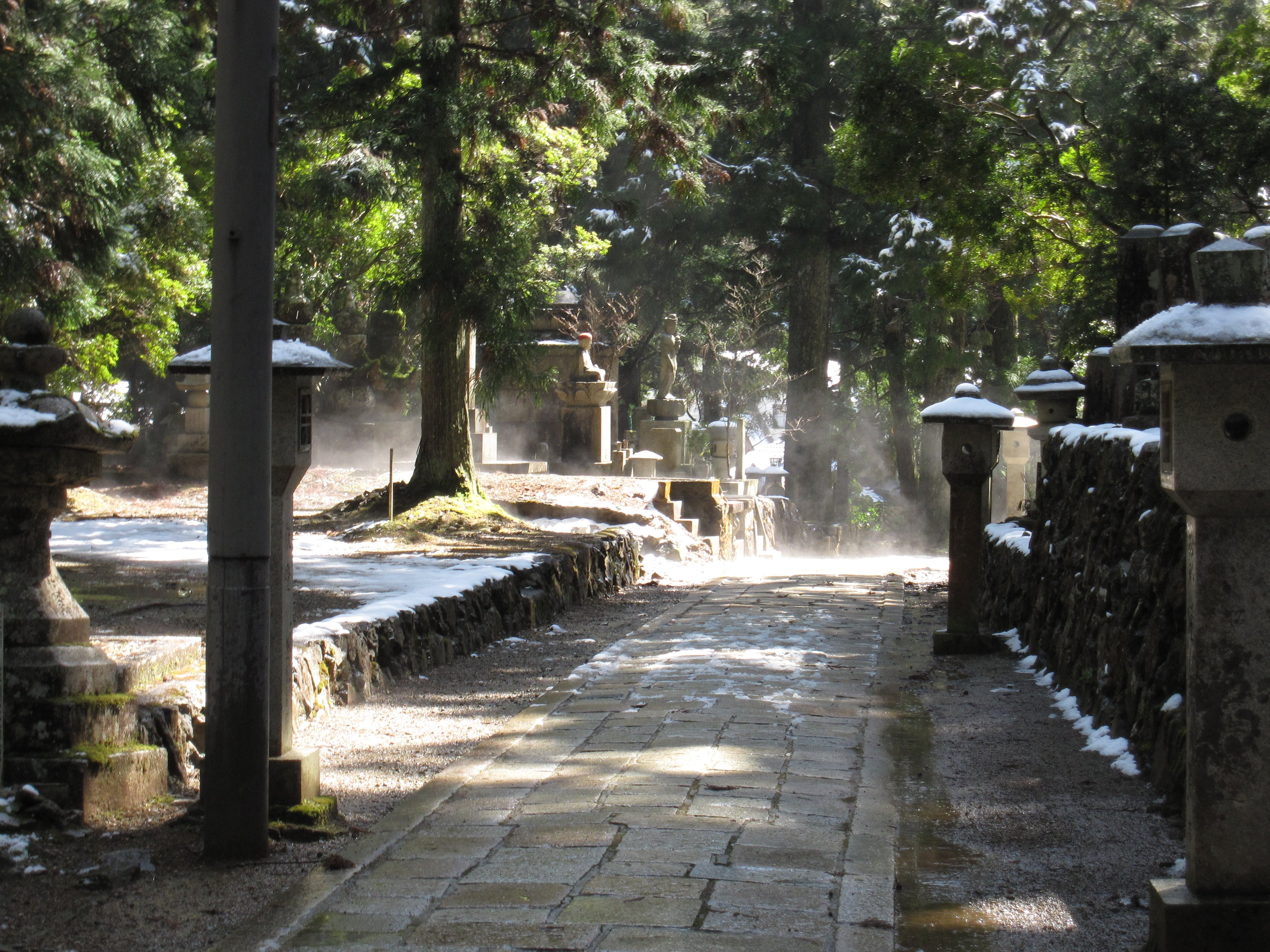
A Path in Okunoin Cemetery

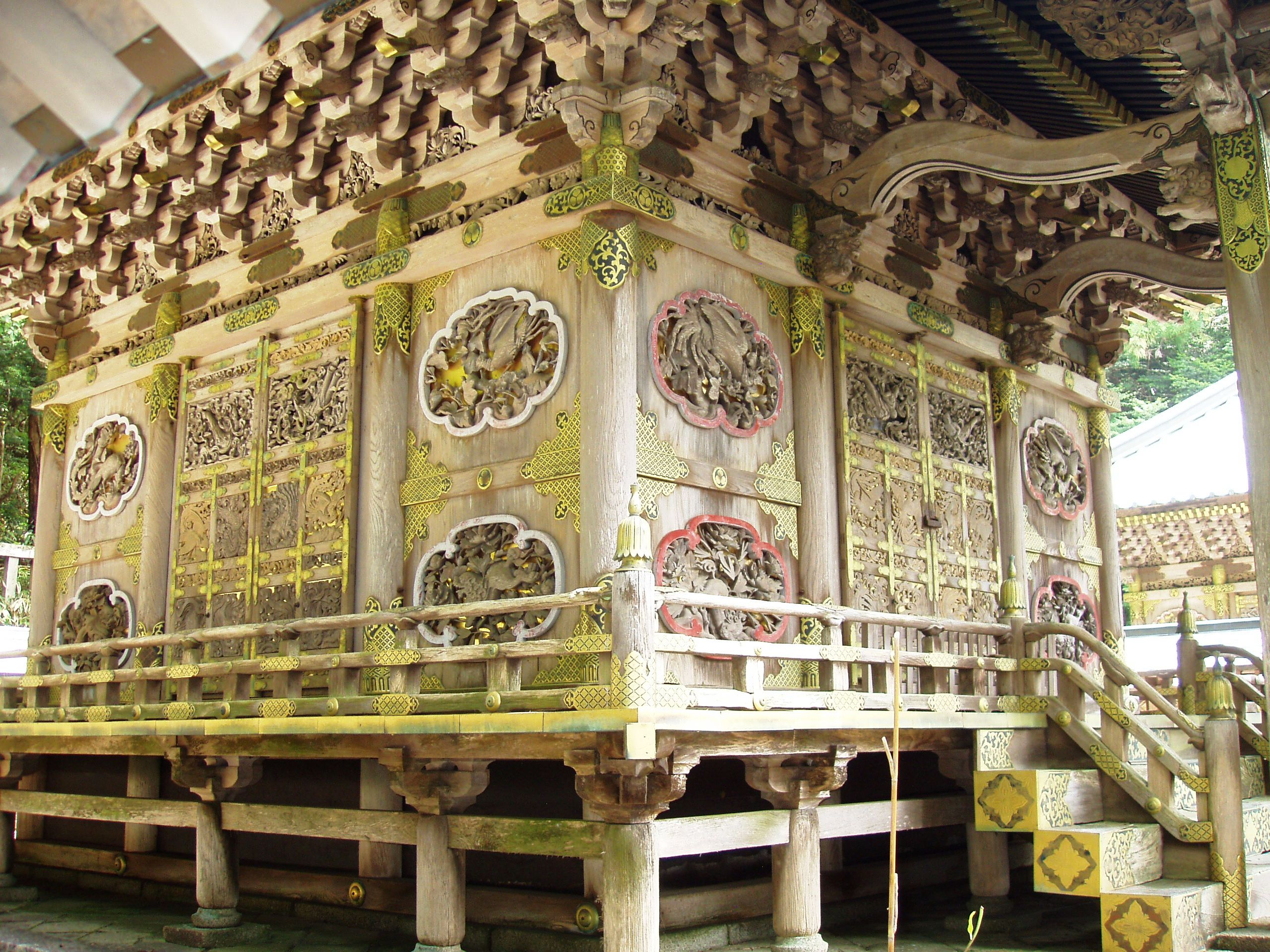
Tokugawa Mausoleum

== See also ==
- Koyasan Reihōkan
- Mount Ōmine
- Sacred mountains
- Tourism in Japan
