= Okunoin =

Sacred site on Mt. Koya, Japan

- 奥之院
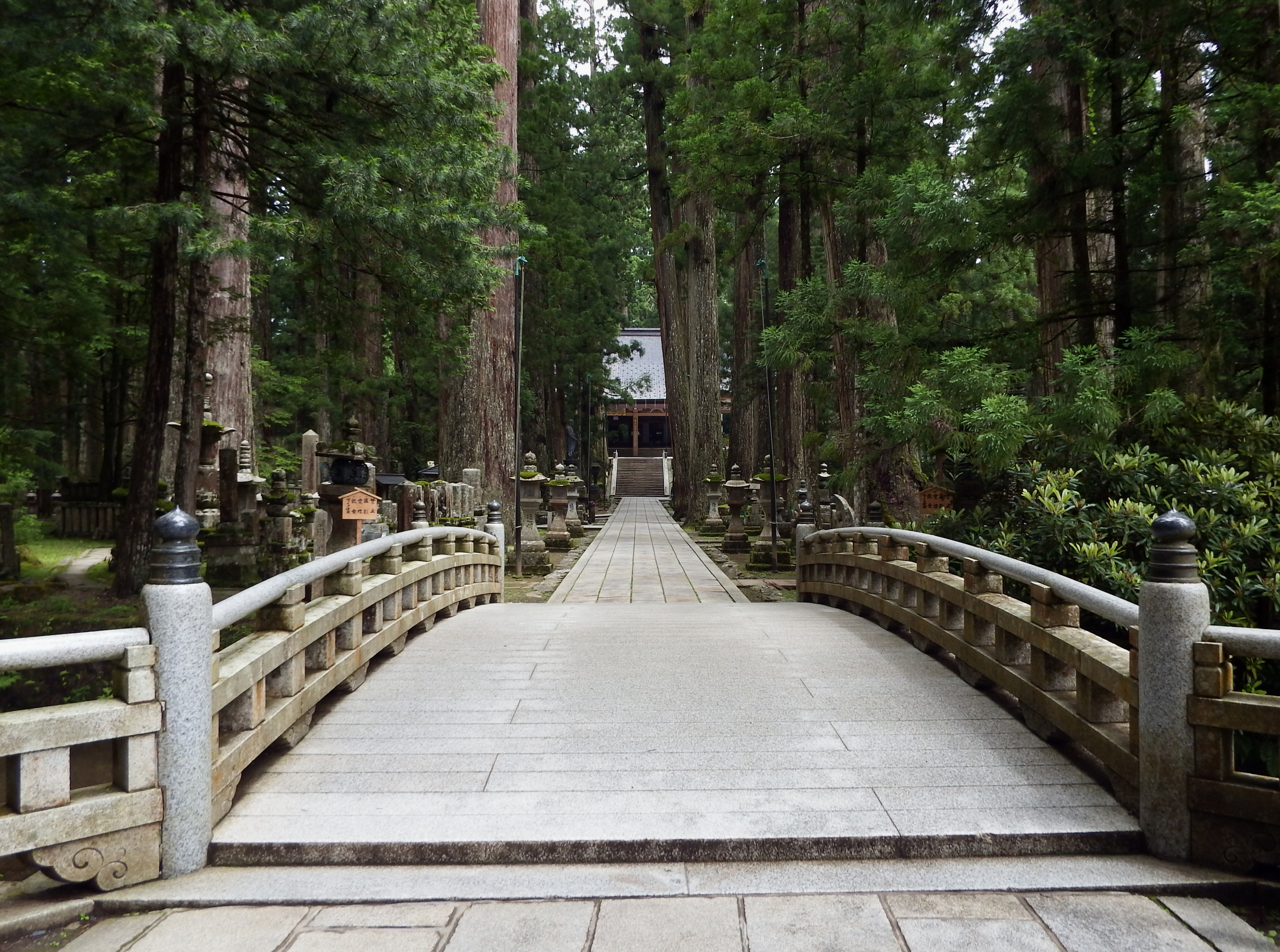
- Gobyō-bashi in Okunoin
- Interactive map of Okunoin

Details
- Location: Mount Kōya, Wakayama Prefecture
- Country: Japan
- Coordinates: 34°13′03″N 135°36′18″E
- Website: koyasan.or.jp/meguru/sights#okunoin

Okunoin or Oku-no-in (Japanese: 奥之院, lit. 'inner sanctuary') is a sacred Buddhist site and cemetery on Mount Kōya, in Wakayama Prefecture, Japan. Opened in 835, it houses the mausoleum of Kūkai, founder of the Shingon school of esoteric Buddhism. It is considered the largest cemetery in Japan, with more than two hundred thousand graves and memorial monuments.

== The site ==
Located on the outskirts of the settlement of Koya, the cemetery spans over 2 km (1.2 mi) in length and is immersed in a forest of tall conifers. The earliest planting records of these trees, belonging predominantly to the genera Cryptomeria and Chamaecyparis, date back to 1012 AD. The area surrounding Kūkai's mausoleum was initially left to its wild state, but only a small area of natural forest remains nowadays, as a large portion of the vegetation was cut during the Meiji era, in the late 19th century.

According to popular belief, after being laid in his mausoleum in 835 AD, Kūkai entered into an eternal samadhi (meditative trance) and is still alive on Mount Kōya, waiting for Maitreya, the Buddha of the future. His resting place in Okunuin has since become a place of pilgrimage, and Buddhist monks bring him ritual offerings and meals twice a day.

=== The cemetery ===
The entrance of the site is marked by the Ichi-no-hashi (lit. 'first bridge'). From there, a 2-kilometer-long (1.2 mi) sandō (walkway) paved with cobblestones guides the visitors to the mausoleum, passing through a site that holds more than 200,000 graves, of which a large number belong to monks and feudal lords.

The Gobyō-bashi marks the entrance to the inner sanctum of Okunoin. Here visitors pour water over the bronze statues of the Mizumuke Jizō, to pray for the souls of their ancestors.

=== Kūkai's mausoleum ===
The path ends at Tōrō-dō, the main hall of worship, built directly in front of the Gobyō, Kūkai's mausoleum. Over ten thousand lanterns, donated by pilgrims and worshippers, are lit in the hall in perpetuity; two of these are said to have been burning without pause for more than 900 years. In 1984, 50,000 statues were donated for the 1150th anniversary of Kūkai's burial and are located in the hall basement. The mausoleum itself, located behind the Tōrō-dō, is a sacred place with no access to the public.

=== Modern section ===
A second entrance to the site is located in front of the Okunoin-mae bus stop, leading to a more recent section of the cemetery. A large number of corporate tombs can be found here, typically bought by Japanese companies for their employees and their families. The first one was built by Kōnosuke Matsushita, founder of Panasonic, in 1938. Several monuments were built to attract the attention of the visitors, such as a memorial in honor of the termites killed by an extermination company. Another monument from ShinMaywa Industries features a large-scale model of the Saturn V rocket that carried Apollo 11 to the Moon, although the company had no connection to the mission.

== Gallery ==
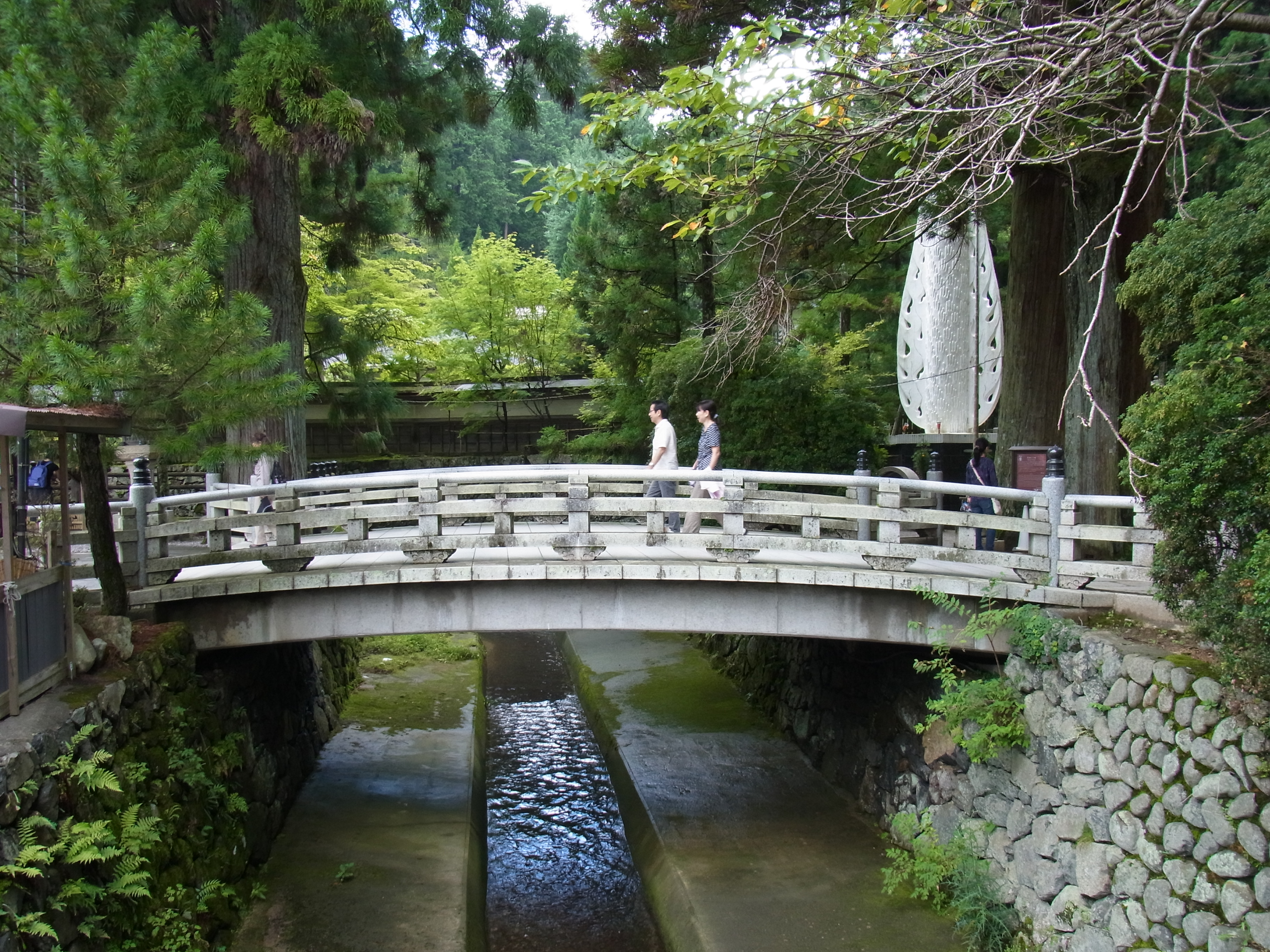
Ichi-no-hashi Bridge

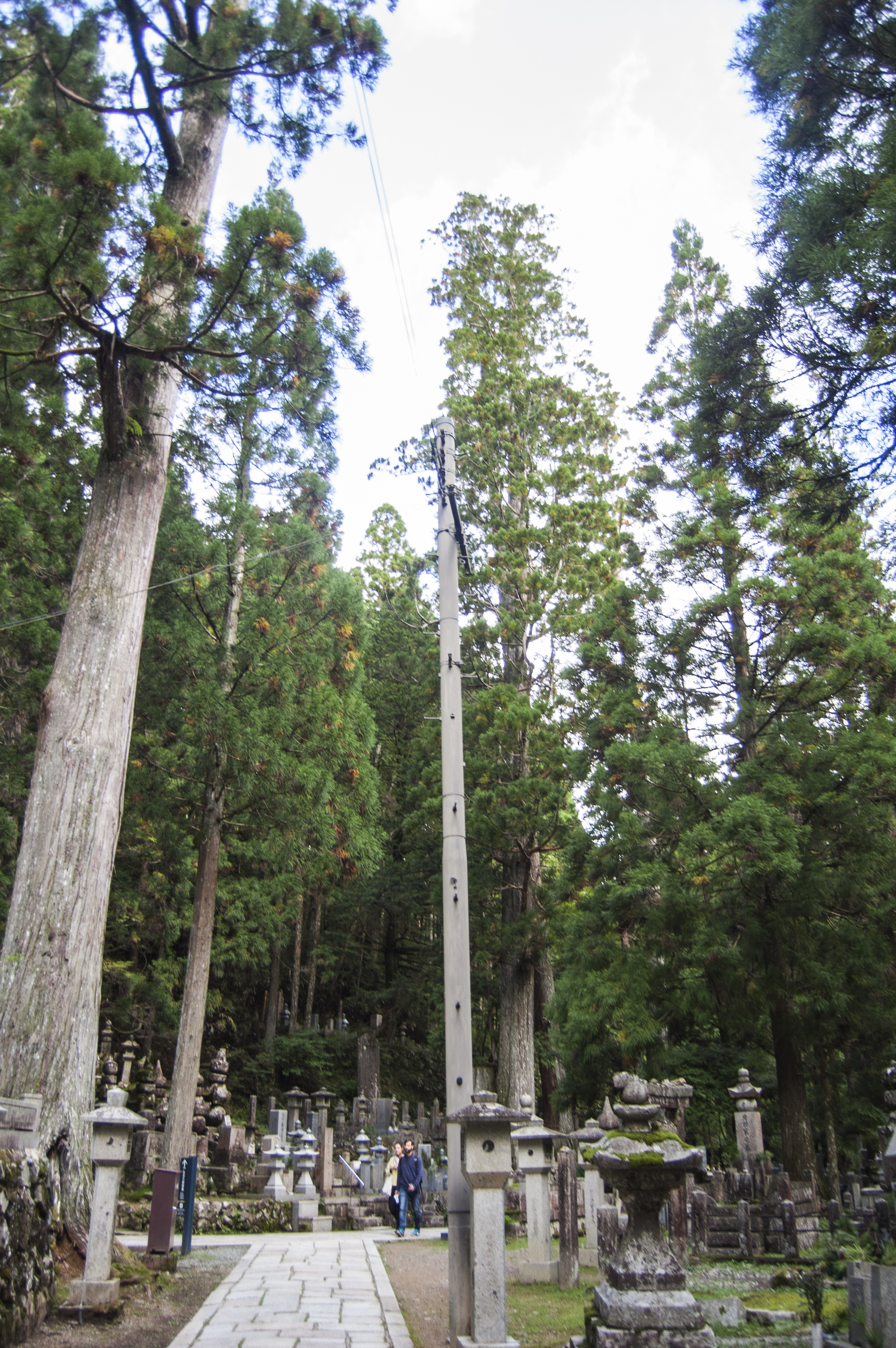
The tall conifers in the cemetery.

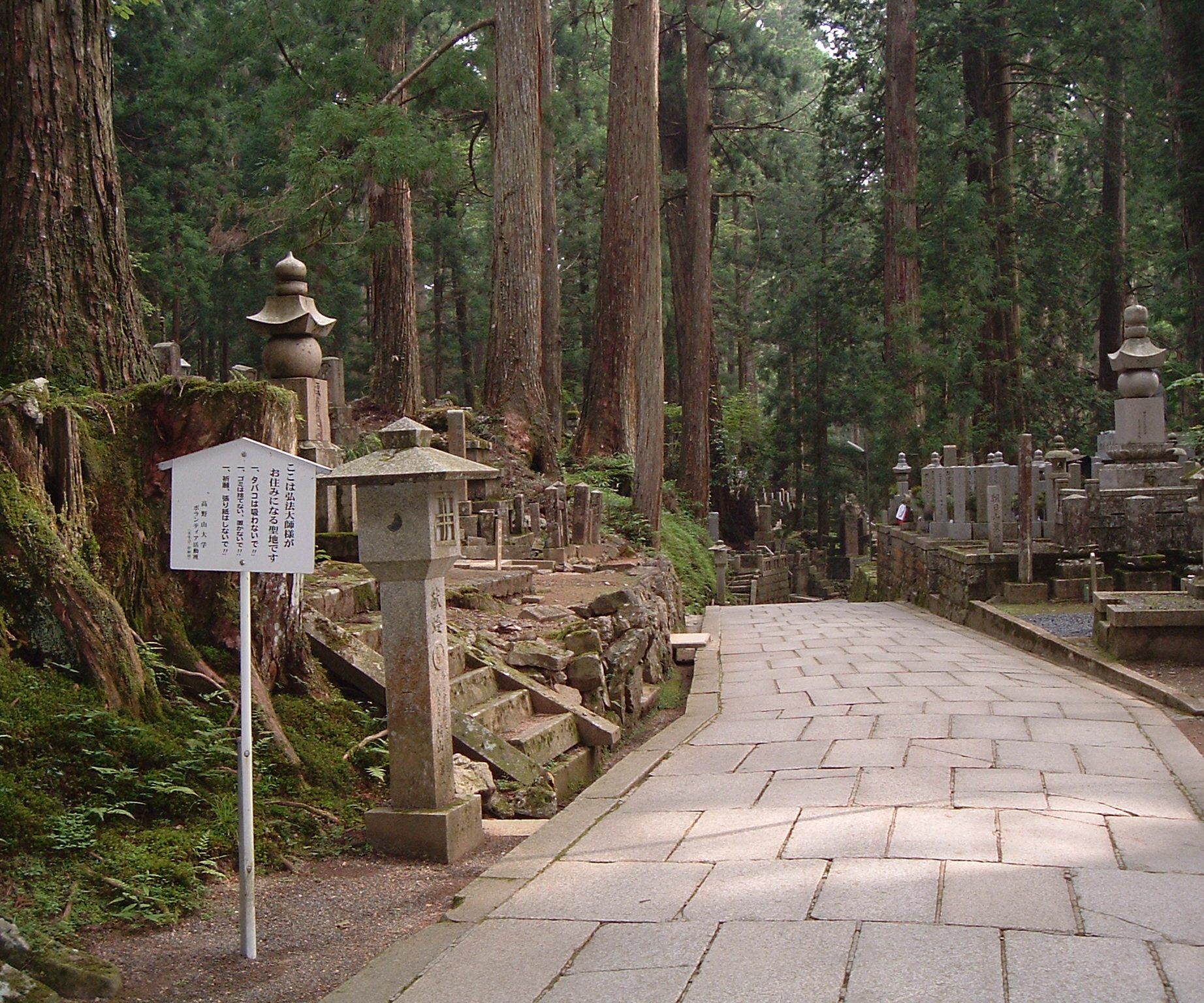
The sandō walkway leading to the mausoleum.

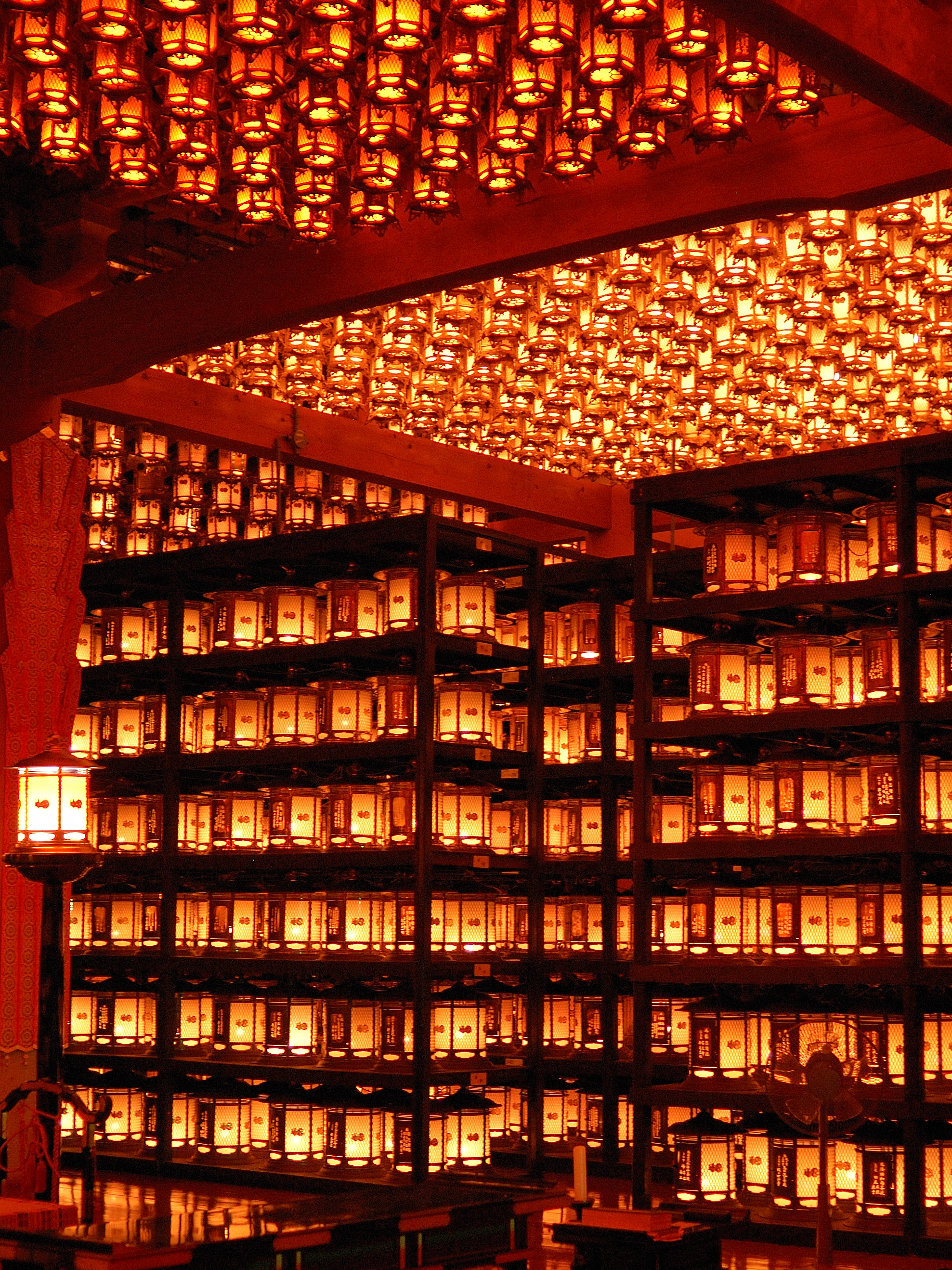
Lanterns burning in Tōrō-dō Hall, in Okunoin.

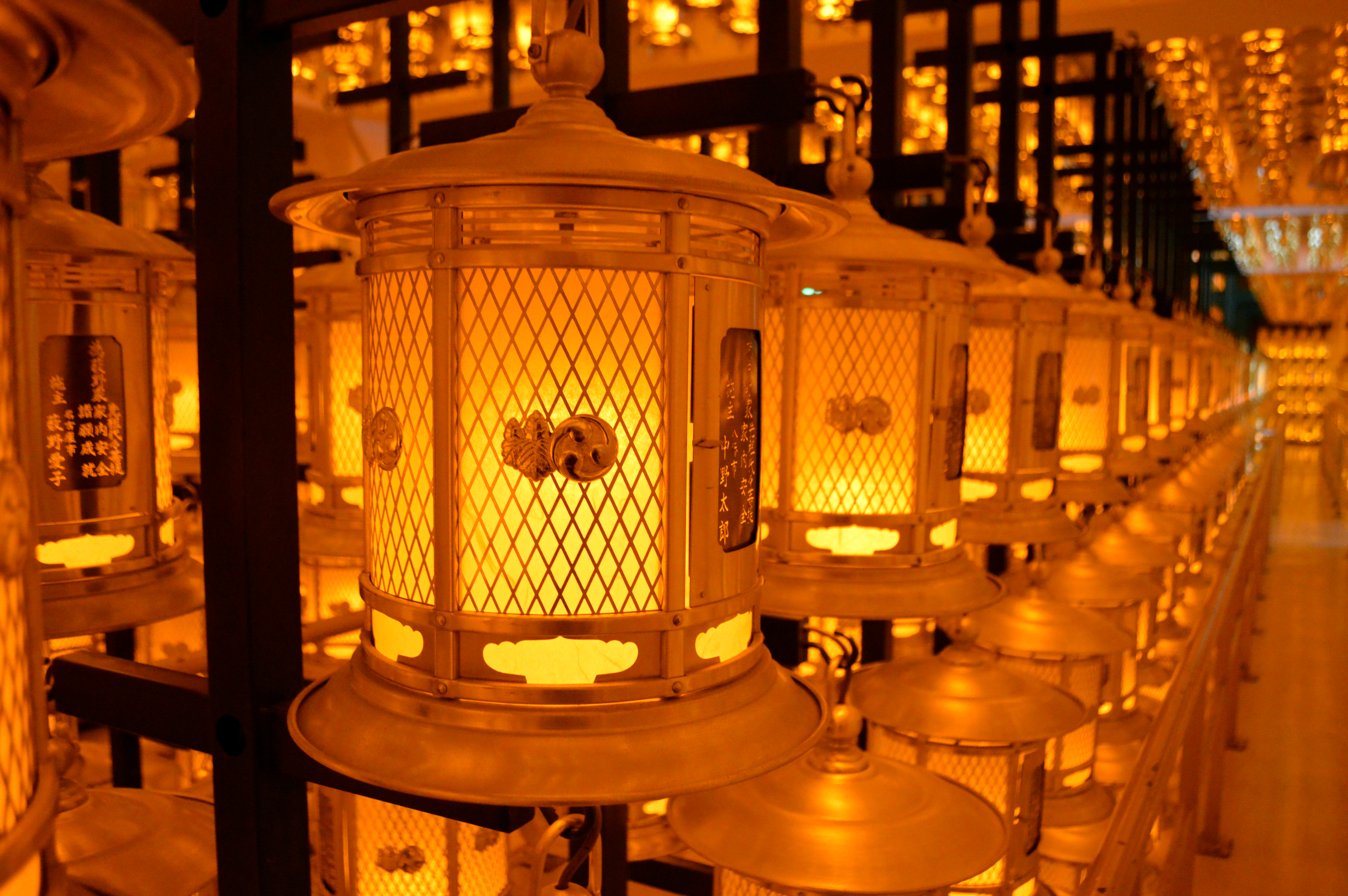
Detail of the lanterns in Tōrō-dō Hall.

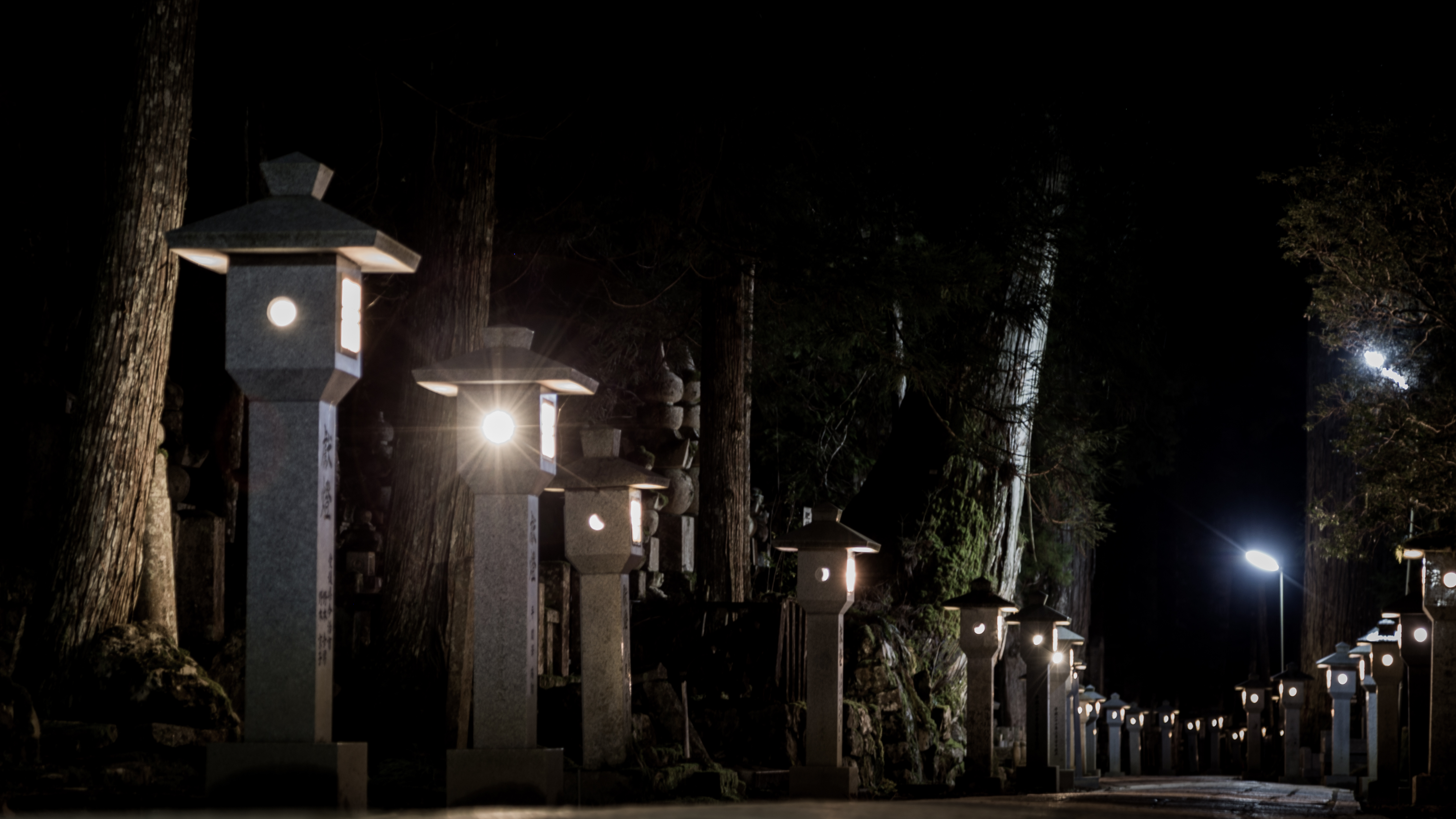
The lit-up pathway at night.

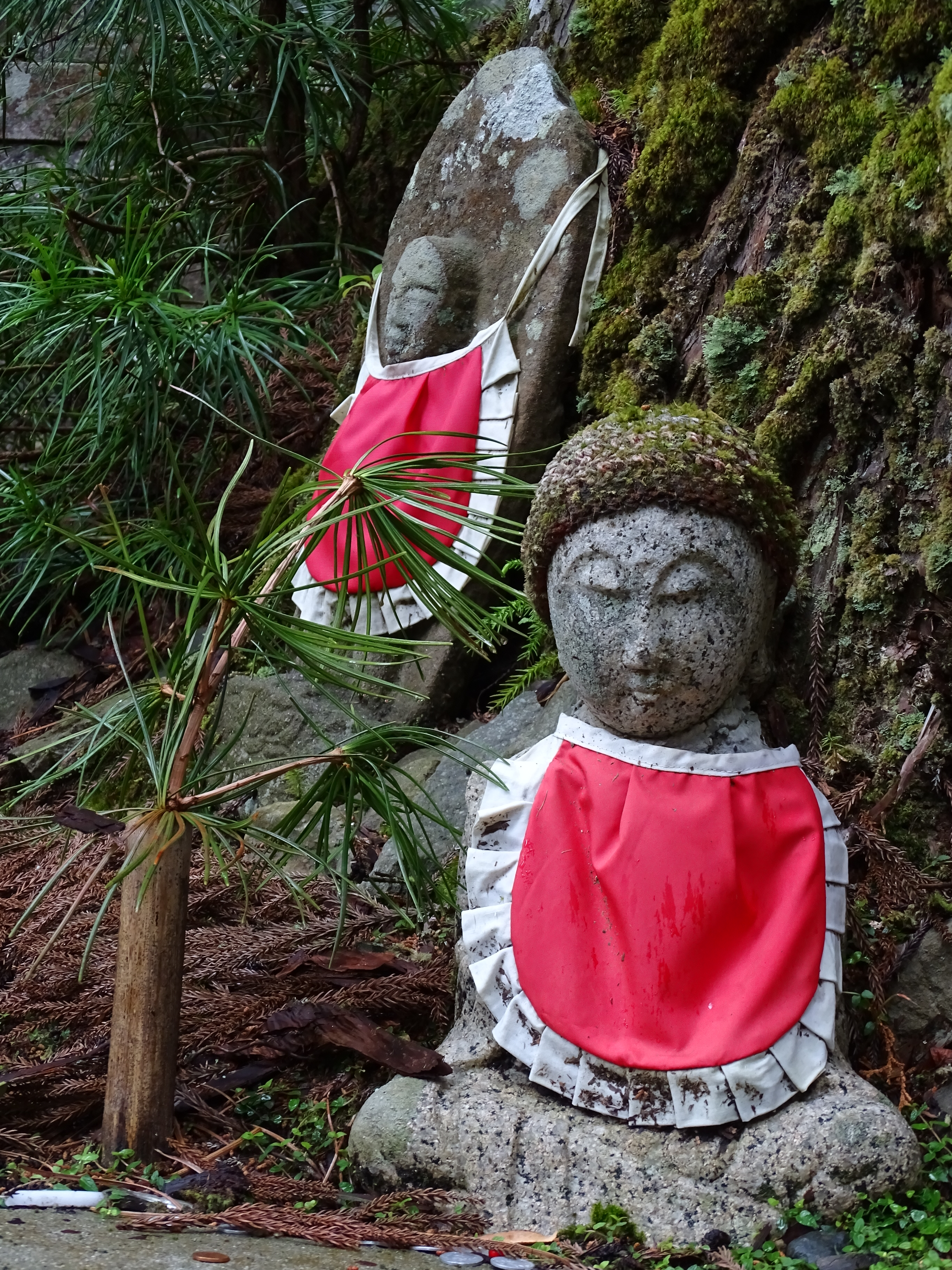
Jizō statues with the traditional red bibs.

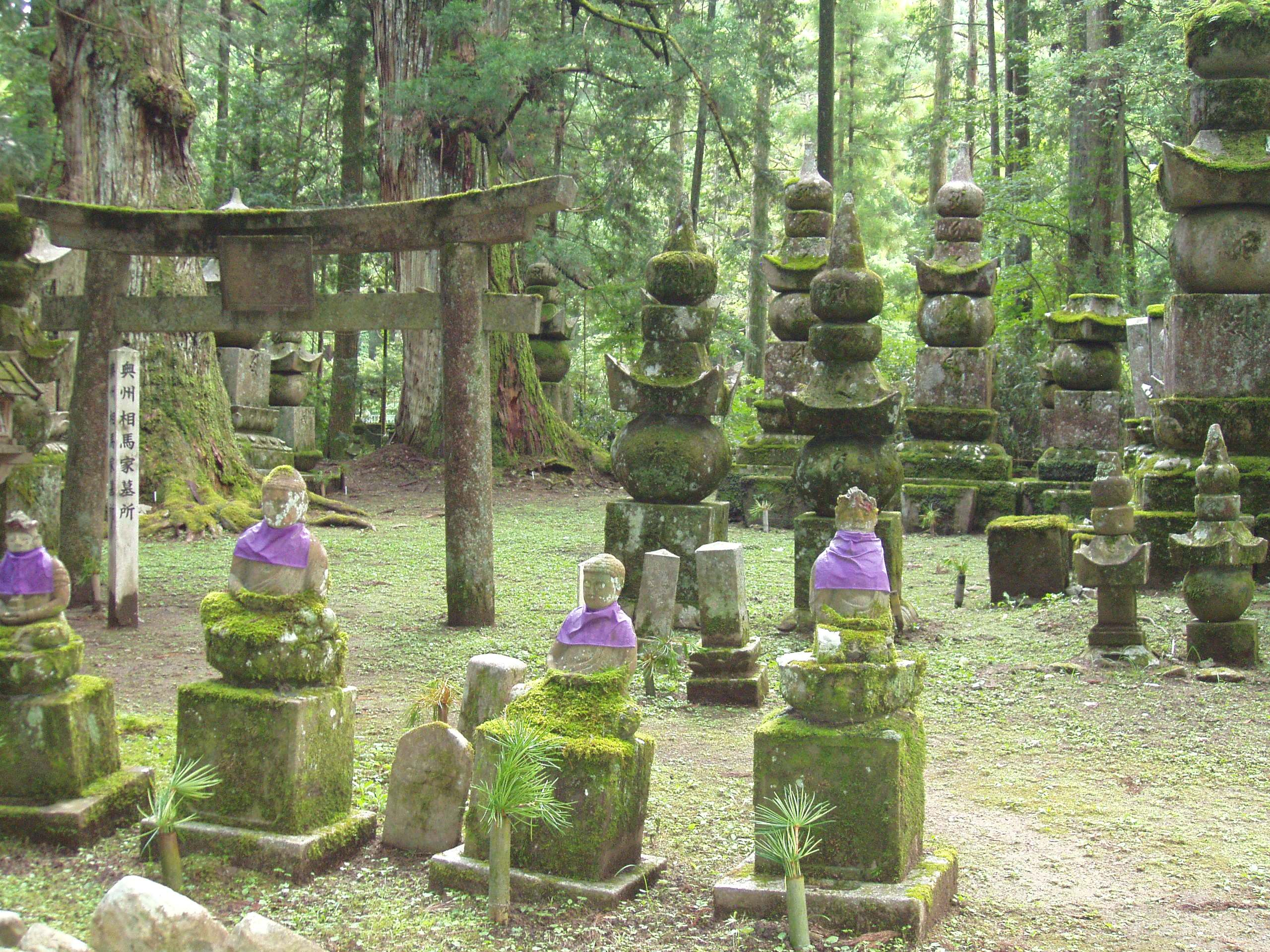
Moss-covered tombs and Jizō statues in Okunoin.

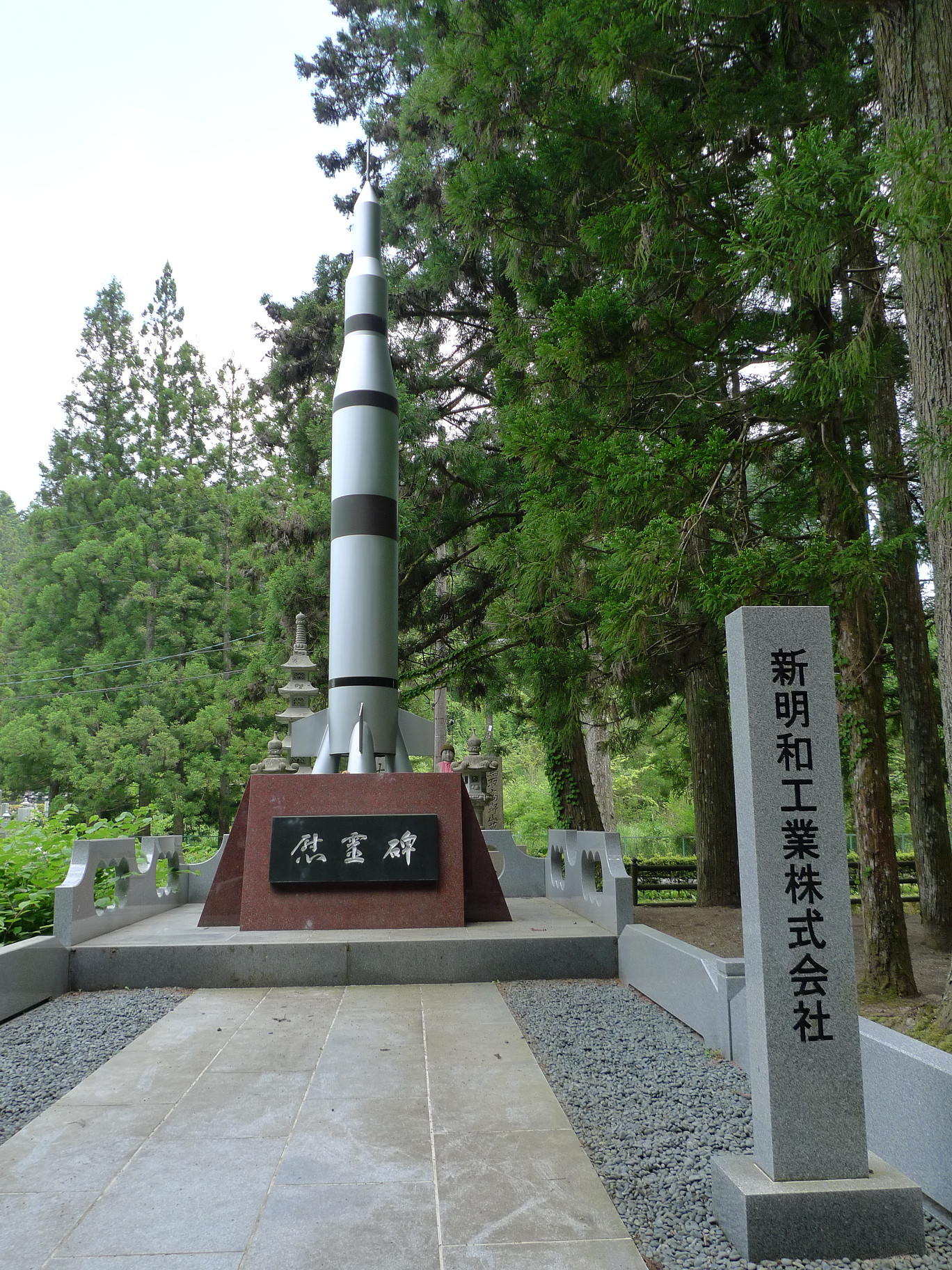
Grave of ShinMaywa, featuring a Saturn V rocket.

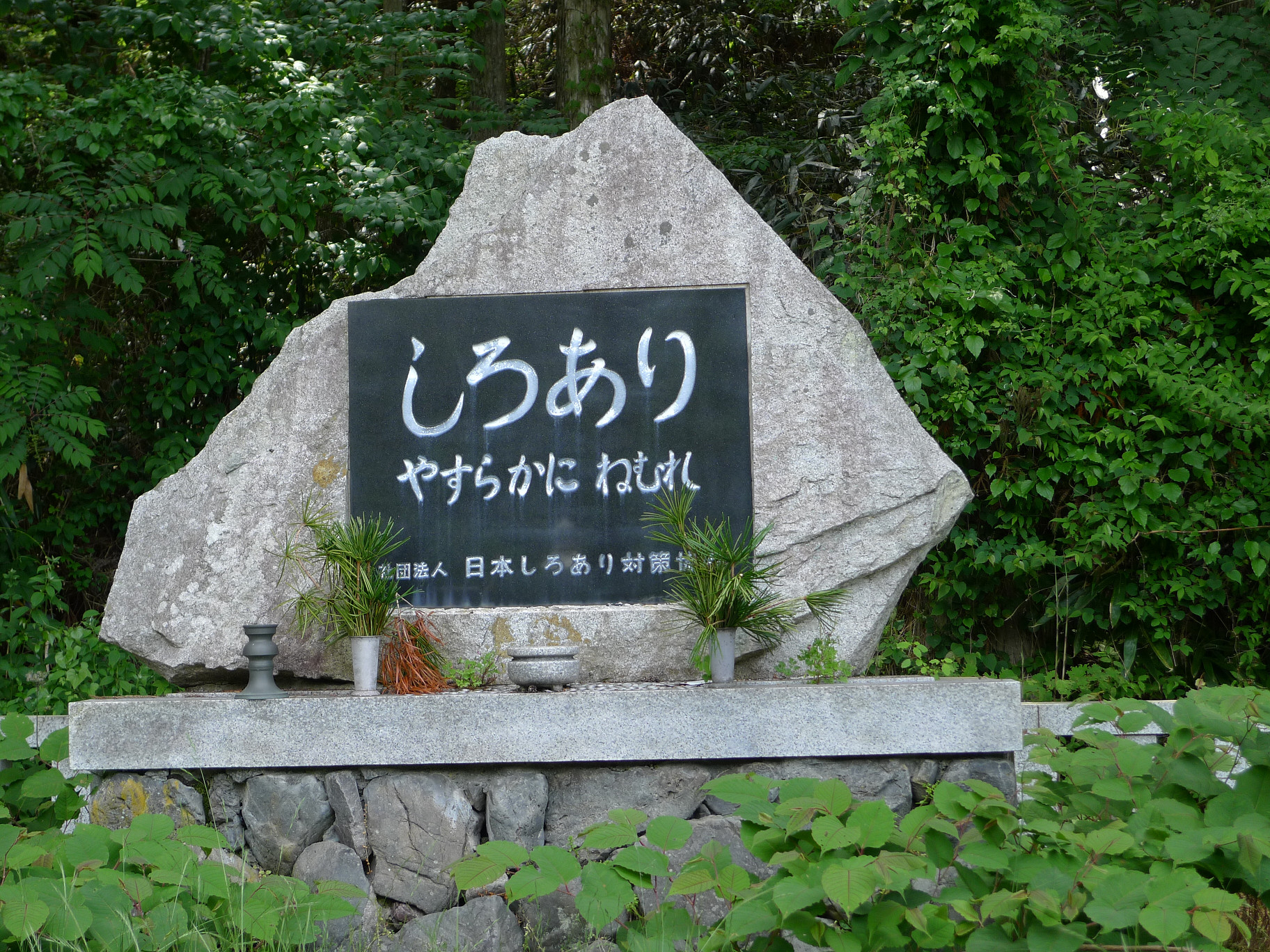
Grave of termites by the Japan Termite Control Association.
