= Nachi Station =

Railway station in Nachikatsuura, Wakayama Prefecture, Japan

Coordinates: 33°38′38.69″N 135°56′11.57″E

Nachi Station 那智駅
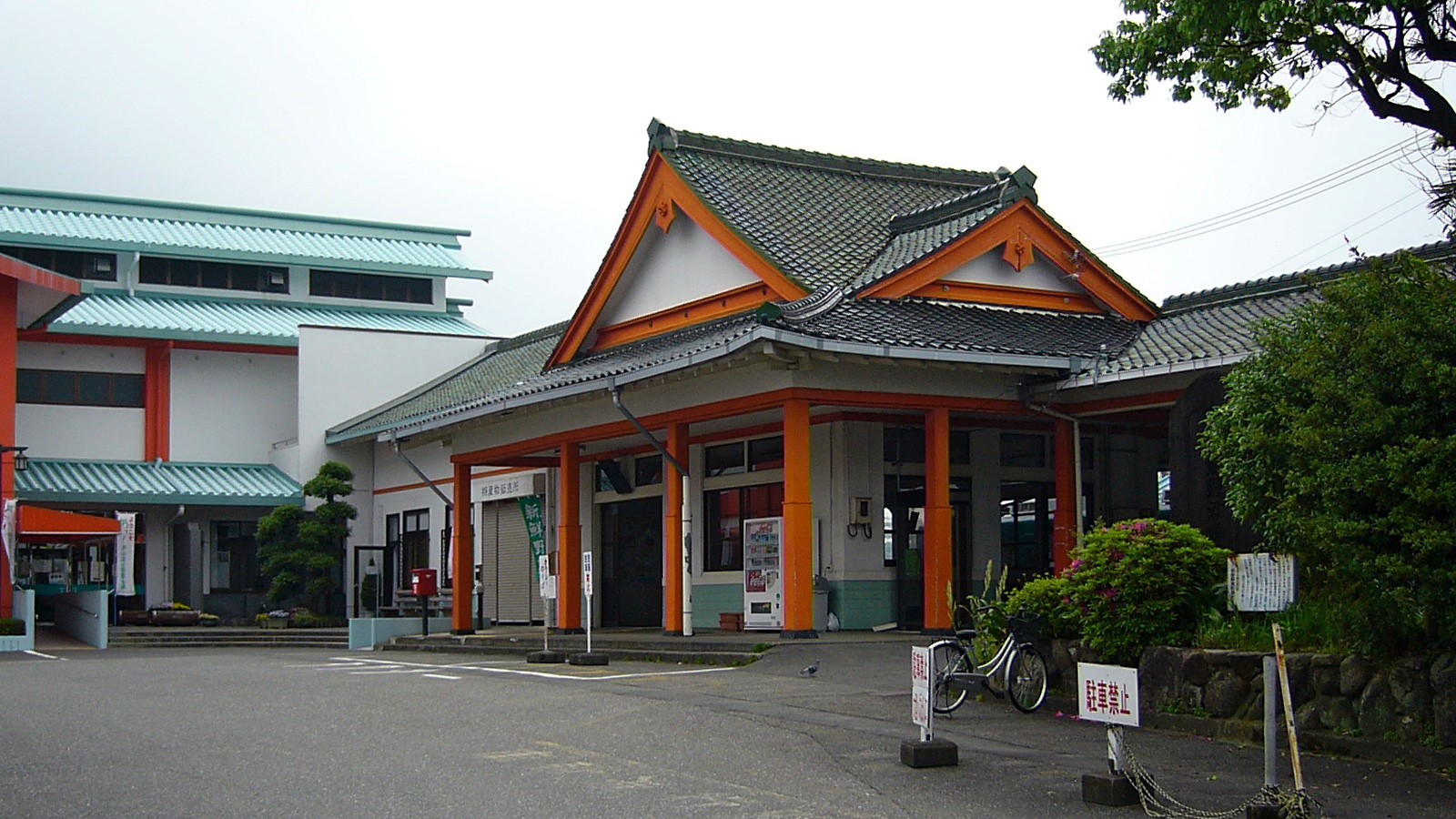
- Nachi Station, August 2005

General information
- Location: 382, Hamanomiya, Nachikatsuura-machi, Wakayama-ken 649-5314; Japan
- System: JR-West commuter rail station
- Owner: West Japan Railway Company
- Operator: West Japan Railway Company
- Line: W Kisei Main Line (Kinokuni Line)
- Distance: 193.0 km (119.9 miles) from Kameyama; 12.8 km (8.0 miles) from Shingū
- Platforms: 2 side platform
- Tracks: 2
- Train operators: West Japan Railway Company

Construction
- Structure type: At grade

Other information
- Status: Unstaffed
- Website: Official website

History
- Opened: 4 December 1912
- Electrified: 1978

Passengers
- FY2019: 27 daily
Services
Preceding station	JR-West	Following station
W Kisei Main Line (Kinokuni Line)
Ukui; Toward Shingū	Local	Kii-Temma; Toward Kii-Katsuura, Kii-Tanabe and Wakayama
Location
- Location within Wakayama Prefecture Location within Japan

Nachi Station (那智駅, Nachi-eki) is a passenger railway station in located in the town of Nachikatsuura, Higashimuro District, Wakayama Prefecture, Japan, operated by West Japan Railway Company (JR West).

== Lines ==
Nachi Station is served by the Kisei Main Line (Kinokuni Line), and is located 193.0 kilometers from the terminus of the line at Kameyama Station and 12.8 kilometers from Shingū.

== Station layout ==
The station consists of two opposed side platforms connected to the station building by an underground passage. The station is painted red and white and is designed to imitate a Shinto shrine, as the shrine is the gateway to the Kumano Nachi Taisha. The station is unattended.

=== Platforms ===
1	■ Kisei Main Line	for Shingū
2	■ Kisei Main Line	for Kii-Katsuura, Kii-Tanabe and Wakayama

== Adjacent stations ==
«	Service	»
West Japan Railway Company (JR West)
Kisei Main Line
Limited Express Nanki: Does not stop at this station
Limited Express Kuroshio: Does not stop at this station
Ukui	Local	Kii-Temma

== History ==
Nachi Station opened on the Shingu Railway on December 4, 1912. The Shingu Railway was nationalized on July 1, 1934, and the current station building was completed in December 1936. With the privatization of the Japan National Railways (JNR( on April 1, 1987, the station came under the aegis of the West Japan Railway Company.

== Passenger statistics ==
In fiscal 2019, the station was used by an average of 27 passengers daily (boarding passengers only).

== Surrounding Area ==
- Fudarakusan-ji
- Kumano Nachi Taisha
- Seiganto-ji
- Nachi Falls

== See also ==
- List of railway stations in Japan
