= List of cultural properties of Japan – archaeological materials (Wakayama) =

This list is of the cultural properties of Japan designated in the category of archaeological materials (考古資料, rekishi shiryō) for the Prefecture of Wakayama.

== National Cultural Properties ==
As of 1 February 2015, eight Important Cultural Properties (including one *National Treasure) have been designated, being of national significance.

Property	Date	Municipality	Ownership	Comments	Image	Coordinates	Ref.
*Mirror with Design of Human Figures 人物画象鏡 jinbutsu gazō kagami	Kofun period (likely 503)	Taitō, Tokyo	Suda Hachiman Jinja (隅田八幡神社) (kept at Tokyo National Museum)			35°43′08″N 139°46′35″E	
Excavated Artefacts from Kii Ōji Jinja Sutra Mound 紀伊王子神社経塚出土品; Kii Ōji Jinja kyōzuka shutsudo hin	Heian period	Hidaka	Nyakuichiōji Jinja (若一王子神社)			33°55′20″N 135°05′04″E	
Excavated Artefacts from Kii Ōtani Kofun 紀伊大谷古墳出土品; Kii Ōtani kofun shutsudo hin	Kofun period	Wakayama	Wakayama City Museum			34°14′00″N 135°09′47″E	
Old Bronze Seal 古銅印 ko dō in	Heian period	Nachikatsuura	Kumano Nachi Taisha			33°40′07″N 135°53′25″E	
Excavated Artefacts from Mount Kōya Okunoin 高野山奥之院出土品; Kōyasan okunoin shutsudo hin	Heian to Muromachi period	Kōya	Kongōbu-ji			34°12′51″N 135°35′03″E	
Standing Bronze Nyorai and Two Kannon Bosatsu and Seated Gilt Bronze Dainichi Nyorai; Low Relief Panels with Seated Gilt Bronze Ashuku Nyorai, Hōshō Nyorai, Fukujōju Nyorai, and Kongōhō Bosatsu 銅造如来立像 銅造観音菩薩立像 銅造観音菩薩立像 金銅大日如来坐像 金銅薄肉阿閦如来坐像 金銅薄肉宝生如来坐像 金銅薄肉不空成就如来坐像 金銅薄肉金剛宝菩薩坐像 dōzō Nyorai ryūzō dōzō Kannon bosatsu ryūzō dōzō Kannon bosatsu ryūzō kondō Dainichi Nyorai zazō kondō usuniku Ashuku Nyorai zazō kondō usuniku Hōshō Nyorai zazō kondō usuniku Fukujōju Nyorai zazō kondō usuniku Kongōhō Bosatsu zazō	Heian period	Nachikatsuura	Seiganto-ji	eight images excavated from Nachisan Sutra Mound (那智山経塚)		33°40′09″N 135°53′23″E	
Relics of Nanpo Matajirō 南保又二郎納骨遺品; Nanpo Matajirō nōkotsu ihin	1287	Kōya	Kongōbu-ji			34°12′51″N 135°35′03″E	
Excavated Artefacts from Isomaiwakage Site, Wakayama Prefecture 和歌山県磯間岩陰遺跡出土品; Wakayama-ken Isomaiwakage iseki shutsudo hin	Kofun period	Tanabe	Tanabe City Museum of History and Folklore (田辺市歴史民俗資料館)			33°43′46″N 135°22′47″E	

== Prefectural Cultural Properties ==
As of 26 February 2014, sixteen properties have been designated at a prefectural level.

Property	Date	Municipality	Ownership	Comments	Image	Coordinates	Ref.
Excavated Artefacts from Shakanokoshi Kofun 車駕之古址古墳出土品; Shakanokoshi kofun shutsudo hin	Kofun period	Wakayama	Wakayama City Board of Education			34°13′50″N 135°10′16″E	
Arimoto Dōtaku 有本銅鐸; Arimoto dōtaku	Yayoi period	Wakayama	Wakayama Prefecture Kii-fudoki-no-oka Museum of Archaeology and Folklore			34°13′40″N 135°13′47″E	
Dōtaku Excavated from Ōta-Kuroda Site 太田・黒田遺跡出土銅鐸; Ōta・Kuroda iseki shutsudo dōtaku	Yayoi period	Wakayama	Wakayama City Museum			34°14′00″N 135°09′47″E	
Excavated Artefacts from Suda Hachiman Jinja Sutra Mound 隅田八幡神社経塚出土品; Suda Hachiman Jinja kyōzuka shutsudo hin	Heian period	Hashimoto	Hashimoto City Board of Education			34°14′00″N 135°09′47″E	
Mirrors with Flower Patterns 内行花文鏡 naikō kamon kyō	Han dynasty	Arida	Enman-ji (円満寺)	two mirrors		34°04′47″N 135°10′52″E	
Noi Dōtaku 野井銅鐸; Noi dōtaku	Yayoi period	Wakayama	private (kept at Wakayama Prefecture Kii-fudoki-no-oka Museum of Archaeology and Folklore)			34°13′40″N 135°13′47″E	
Excavated Artefacts from the Former Kibi Junior High School Playground 旧吉備中学校校庭遺跡出土品 kyū-Kibi chūgakkō kōtei iseki shutsudo hin	Yayoi Period	Aridagawa	Aridagawa Regional Exchange Centre (有田川町地域交流センター)	one fragmentary small bronze mirror, one jade magatama, and seven glass beads		34°04′04″N 135°12′34″E	
Yariganna Mould and Yayoi Ceramics Excavated from Katada Site 堅田遺跡出土ヤリガンナ鋳型附弥生土器; Katada iseki shutsudo yariganna igata tsuketari Yayoi doki	Yayoi Period	Gobō	Gobō City Museum of History and Folklore (御坊市歴史民俗資料館)			33°51′40″N 135°10′07″E	
Excavated Artefacts from Iwauchi Tumuli 1 and 3 岩内１号墳・３号墳出土遺物; Iwauchi 1 gōfun 3 gōfun shutsudo ibutsu	Kofun Period	Gobō	Gobō City Museum of History and Folklore (御坊市歴史民俗資料館)			33°51′40″N 135°10′07″E	
Dōtaku 銅鐸 dōtaku	Yayoi period	Hidakagawa	Dōjō-ji			33°54′52″N 135°10′28″E	
Yamadadai Dōtaku 山田代銅鐸; Yamadadai dōtaku	Yayoi period	Tanabe	Tanabe City Board of Education (kept at Tanabe City Museum of History and Folklore (田辺市歴史民俗資料館))			33°43′46″N 135°22′47″E	
Mount Kamikura Dōtaku 神倉山銅鐸; Kamikurayama dōtaku	Yayoi period	Shingū	Kumano Hayatama Taisha			33°43′56″N 135°59′01″E	
Excavated Artefacts from Asuka Jinja Precinct 熊野阿須賀神社境内出土品; Kumano Asuka Jinja keidai shutsudo hin	Heian to Muromachi period	Shingū	Asuka Jinja (阿須賀神社) (kept at Shingū City Museum of History and Folklore (新宮市立歴史民俗資料館))			33°43′42″N 135°59′49″E	
Excavated Artefacts from the Hall of Emperor Kazan 花山法皇御籠所出土御器物; Hanayama Hōō gokagosho shutsudo okibutsu	Kamakura period	Nachikatsuura	Kumano Nachi Taisha			33°40′07″N 135°53′25″E	
Excavated Artefacts from Nachisan Sutra Mound 那智山経塚出土品; Nachisan kyōzuka shutsudo hin	late Heian to Edo period	Nachikatsuura	Kumano Nachi Taisha			33°40′07″N 135°53′25″E	
Excavated Artefacts from Nachisan Sutra Mound 那智山経塚出土品; Nachisan kyōzuka shutsudo hin	Heian to Kamakura period	Nachikatsuura	Seiganto-ji	22 items, comprising one cylindrical bronze sutra holder and four further fragments, one bronze lid, six bronze mirrors, eight kakebotoke (votive plaque) fragments, and two vajra		33°40′09″N 135°53′23″E	

== See also ==
- Cultural Properties of Japan
- List of National Treasures of Japan (archaeological materials)
- List of Historic Sites of Japan (Wakayama)
- List of Cultural Properties of Japan - historical materials (Wakayama)
