= Eight Shrines of Ryūkyū =

The Eight Shrines of Ryūkyū (琉球八社, Ryūkyū Hassha) are eight shrines in the Ryukyu Kingdom that were shrines by the Ryukyuan government under the "Ryukyu Hasha (government-owned) shrine system. Asato Hachiman Shrine is dedicated to Hachiman Daibosatsu, Emperor Ojin, Princess Tamayori, and Empress Jingu. while the other shrines enshrine Kumano Gongen.

== History ==
It is not clear when or why they began to be called eight shrines. All of these shrines had a Shingon Buddhist temple attached to them.

The oldest one is thought to be the Okimiya, which is said to have been built during the time of Minamoto no Tematomo, who is believed to have been the father of Shunten.

In the Meiji era, the shrine was listed as Imperial shrines, 3rd rank, and considered as the Chinjugami of Okinawa, but it was damaged in the World War II. After the war, the main shrine and shrine office were rebuilt in 1953. In 1930, the main shrine building and other buildings were completed as part of the Heisei Era construction.

Futenma Shrine was torn down by the U.S. military after WW2 and rebuilt in 1950. The main shrine is located in a limestone cave.

== List of 8 Ryukyu Shrines ==
Name of shrine	Annexed temples	Picture	Address	Principal deities
Naminoue Shrine	Gokoku-ji	波上宮 拝殿	Wakasa, Naha	Kumano Gongen
Kinogu	Rinkai Temple	沖宮 鳥居と拝殿	Okubuyama, Naha	Kumano Gongen
Shikinagu	Jinoji	識名宮 拝殿	Shigetagawa, Naha	Kumano Gongen
Futenman-gu Shrine	Jinguji	普天満宮 拝殿	Futenma,Ginowan	Kumano Gongen
Sueyoshi-gū	Hensho-ji		Shuri Sueyoshi, Naha	Kumano Gongen
Asato Hachiman Shrine	Hachiman-ji		Asato, Naha	Hachiman
Ameku-gū	Amekuyamaseigenji		Tomari, Naha	Kumano Gongen
Kin-gu	Kin-Kannonji		Kotou-gun, Kimbu-cho, Kimbu	Kumano Gongen
