= Sueyoshi-gū =

Shinto shrine in Okinawa Prefecture, Japan

Sueyoshi Shrine Shīshi-gū 末吉宮
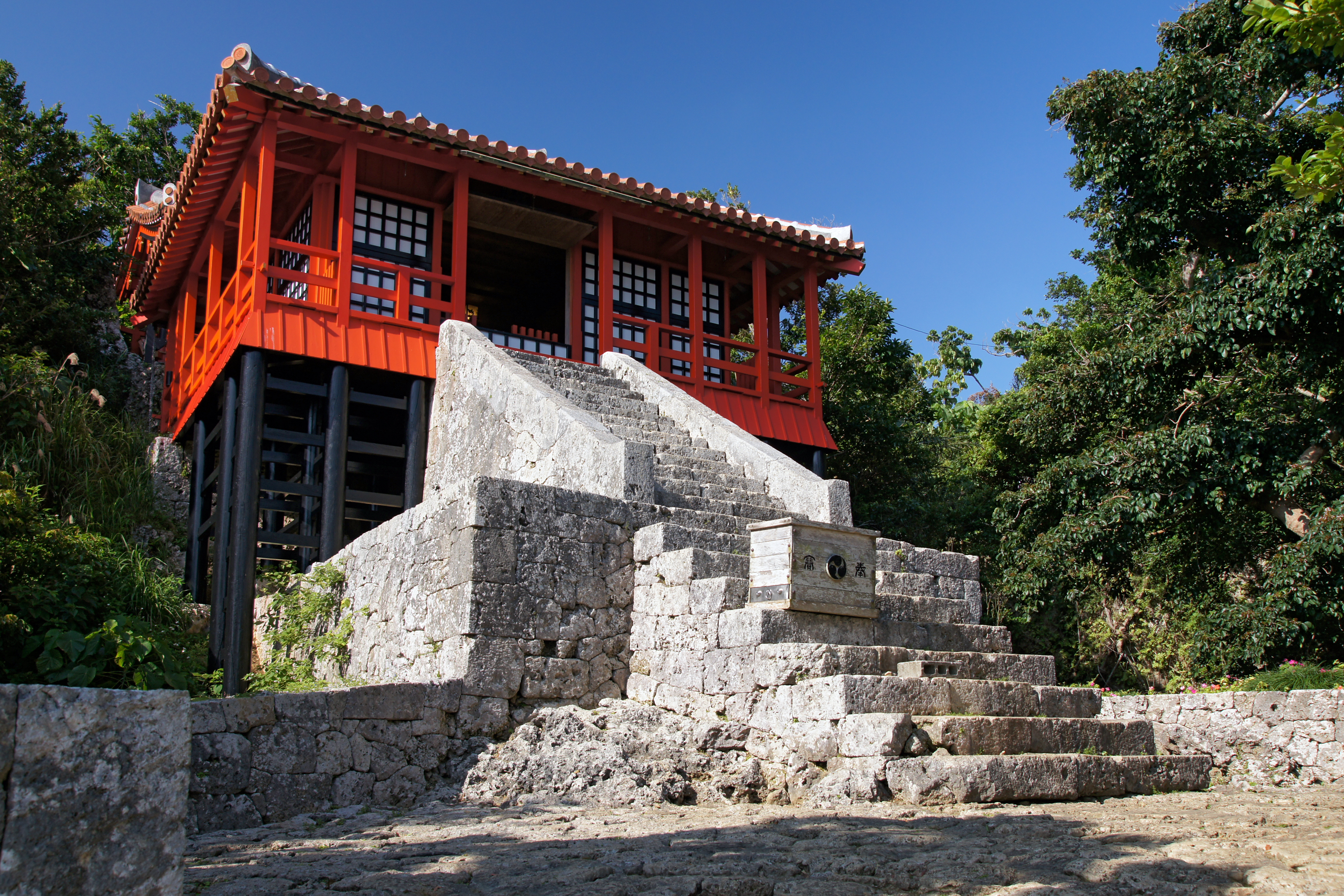
- Haiden of Sueyoshi Shrine

- Sueyoshi Shrine Sueyoshi-gū (Japan)

Religion
- Affiliation: Shinto
- Deity: Kumano Gongen
- Festival: November 23
- Type: Kumano

Location
- Location: 1-8 Sueyoshi-cho, Shuri, Naha-shi, Okinawa-ken
- Interactive map of Sueyoshi Shrine; Shīshi-gū 末吉宮
- Coordinates: 26°13′48.6″N 127°42′50.6″E

Architecture
- Style: Nagare-zukuri
- Founder: King Shō Taikyū
- Established: Jingtai Emperor era (1449-1457)
- Glossary of Shinto National Historic Site of Japan

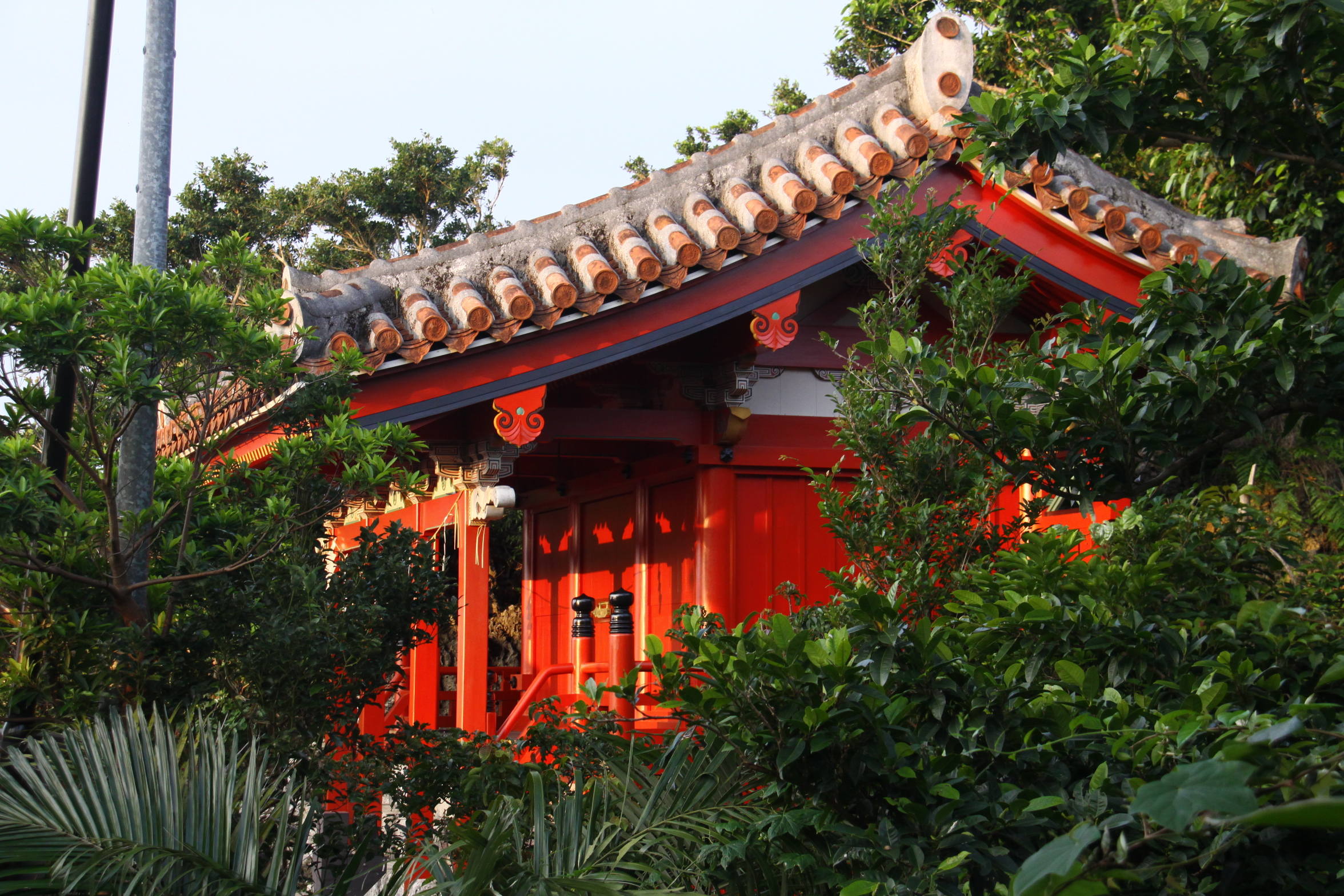
Sueyoshi Shrine Honden

Sueyoshi Shrine (末吉宮, Sueyoshi-gū; Okinawan: Shīshi-gū) is a Shinto shrine in the Shuri-Sueyoshi neighborhood of the city of Naha in Okinawa Prefecture, Japan. Its grounds were designated a National Historic Site in 1972. The main festival of the shrine is held annually on November 23. It is one of the Eight Shrines of Ryūkyū, a group of eight shrines that were officially supported by the Ryukyu Kingdom. These official shrines received salaries and maintenance expenses for their priests from the royal court,

== Enshrined kami ==
The kami enshrined at Sueyoshi Jinja are the Kumano Gongen:

- Izanami (伊弉冉尊)
- Hayatama-o-no-Mikoto (速玉男尊)
- Koyosaka no Mikoto (事解男尊)

In addition, the following kami are enshrined as secondary deities

- Tsuchimi Oyakami (土祖神)
- Okutsuhiko-no-Mikoto (澳津彦命)
- Okutsuhme-no-Mikoto. (澳津姫命)
- Ubesuna-no-kami (産土神)

== History ==
The "Daikei-san Gongen Engi" section of the Ryūkyū-koku yurai-ki, compiled in 1713 dates the founding of this shrine to the Jingtai Emperor era (1450-1457) and records the following legend about its founding:

During the reign of King Shō Taikyū, the sixth king of the Ryūkyū Kingdom, the former head priest of Tenkai-ji, Kakuo, was in his prime and training in Yamato. He turned to Kumano and vowed, "If I achieve my academic training, I will return to Japan make a pilgrimage to Kumano." Eventually, he became the abbot and requested leave from King Shō Taikyū to fulfill his vow, but the king repeatedly refused. One day, a person appeared in his dream and said, "Teacher, if you wish to achieve your ambition, from now on, call out loudly towards the northern mountains. Wherever you call out, you will receive miraculous powers. That is your abode. I am Kumano Gongen." Waking up from the dream, he reached a mountain, and feeling a sense of wonder, and called out, only to hear his voice echo across the mountain. When he inquired about the location, he found Kikusengan, a sacred place, untouched by humankind. He found a demon mask there and prayed, believing it to be a sign of miraculous power. When he reported this to the king, the king, who had also had a miraculous dream, concluded that this event was likely significant and issued an edict to his ministers, who then erected a large shrine on this site. Furthermore, when Kakuo walked through this place, he found a mirror, which emitted a miraculous light and was therefore kept within the inner sanctuary of the shrine. The above legend is almost identical to the "Sueko Gongenji" section of the Ryūkyū Shintō-ki, first published in 1648.

Manjū-ji (now Henjō-ji), mentioned in the Ryūkyū-koku yurai-ki was the jingū-ji of this shrine, and was a temple of the Shingon sect.

In the Meiji period, after the Ryūkyū Kingdom was annexed and Okinawa Prefecture was established, this shrine was classified as an unranked shrine under the Modern system of ranked Shinto shrines as it lacked the funding and facilities to rank it as a village shrine. By the time it was included in the Okinawa Prefectural Development Project's reconstruction plan in 1939, the worship hall, which had remained until the end of the Meiji period, was gone. The Honden, built in the Sangensha Nagare-zukuri-style, which had been designated a National Treasure in 1936, had lost most of its roof tiles, two of the rafters on three sides were missing, and the entire building was in a state of general decay and disrepair. The Honden was destroyed during the 1945 Battle of Okinawa, leaving only the foundation stones, two pillars, and a pierced beam. The shrine building that can be seen today was reconstructed in 1972 using the remaining foundation stones and materials.

== See also ==
- List of Historic Sites of Japan (Okinawa)
