= Kii-Sano Station =

Railway station in Shingū, Wakayama Prefecture, Japan

Kii-Sano Station 紀伊佐野駅
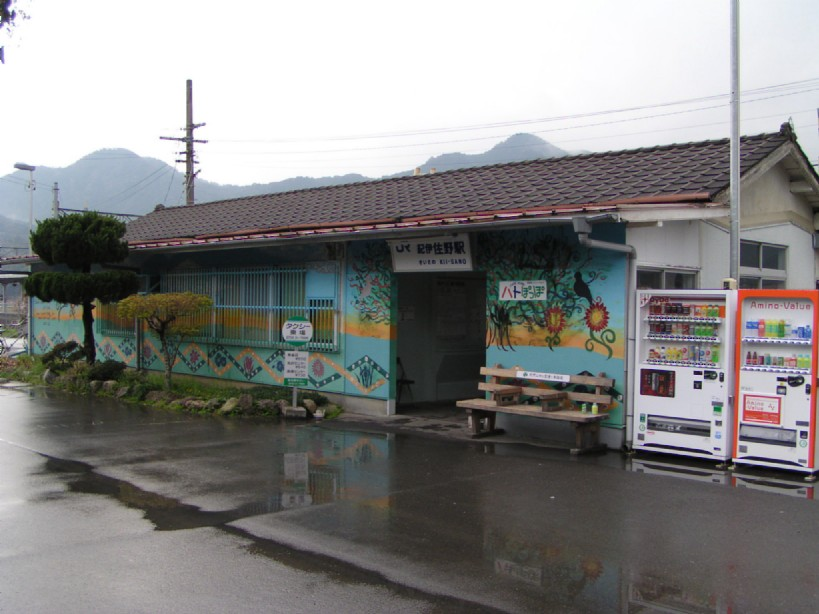
- Kii-Sano Station

General information
- Location: 9-2, Sano 3-chome, Shingū-shi, Wakayama-ken 647-0071; Japan
- Coordinates: 33°40′48″N 135°58′15″E
- System: JR-West commuter rail station
- Owner: West Japan Railway Company
- Operator: West Japan Railway Company
- Line: W Kisei Main Line (Kinokuni Line)
- Distance: 186.6 km (115.9 miles) from Kameyama; 6.4 km (4.0 miles) from Shingū
- Platforms: 1 side platform
- Tracks: 2
- Train operators: West Japan Railway Company

Construction
- Structure type: At grade

Other information
- Status: Unstaffed
- Website: http://www.jr-odekake.net/eki/top.php?id=0622040

History
- Opened: 17 April 1913
- Electrified: 1978
- Former names: Sanomura (to 1934); Akitsuno (to 1942)

Passengers
- FY2019: 229 daily
Services
Preceding station	JR-West	Following station
W Kisei Main Line (Kinokuni Line)
Miwasaki; Toward Shingū	Local	Ukui; Toward Kii-Katsuura, Kii-Tanabe and Wakayama
Location
- Location within Wakayama Prefecture Location within Japan

Kii-Sano Station (紀伊佐野駅, Kii-Sano-eki) is a passenger railway station in located in the city of Shingū, Wakayama Prefecture, Japan, operated by West Japan Railway Company (JR West).

== Lines ==
Kii-Sano Station is served by the Kisei Main Line (Kinokuni Line), and is located 186.6 kilometers from the terminus of the line at Kameyama Station and 6.4 kilometers from Shingū.

== Station layout ==
The station consists of a single island platform connected to the station building by a level crossing. The station is unattended.

=== Platforms ===
1	■ Kisei Main Line	for Kii-Katsuura, Kii-Tanabe and Wakayama
2	■ Kisei Main Line	for Shingū

== Adjacent stations ==
«	Service	»
West Japan Railway Company (JR West)
Kisei Main Line
Limited Express Nanki: Does not stop at this station
Limited Express Kuroshio: Does not stop at this station
Miwasaki	Local	Ukui

== History ==
Kii-Sano Station opened as Sanomura Teiryujo (佐野村停留場) on the Shingu Railway on March 1, 1913, and was upgraded to a full station named Sanomura Station (佐野村駅) on April 17, 1913. The Shingu Railway was nationalized on July 1, 1934, and the station was renamed Akitsuno Station (津野駅). It was renamed again to its present name on April 1, 1942. In August 1945, the Tomoegawa Paper Mill Shingu Factory began operation, with a freight spur line to this station. With the privatization of the Japan National Railways (JNR( on April 1, 1987, the station came under the aegis of the West Japan Railway Company (JR West) and the Japan Freight Railway Company (JR Freight). Freight operations were terminated from March 16, 1996.

== Passenger statistics ==
In fiscal 2019, the station was used by an average of 229 passengers daily (boarding passengers only).

== Surrounding Area ==
- National Route 42
- Wakayama Prefectural Shinsho High School
- Sano River

== See also ==
- List of railway stations in Japan
