= Wakayama Prefecture Kii-fudoki-no-oka Museum of Archaeology and Folklore =

- 和歌山県立紀伊風土記の丘
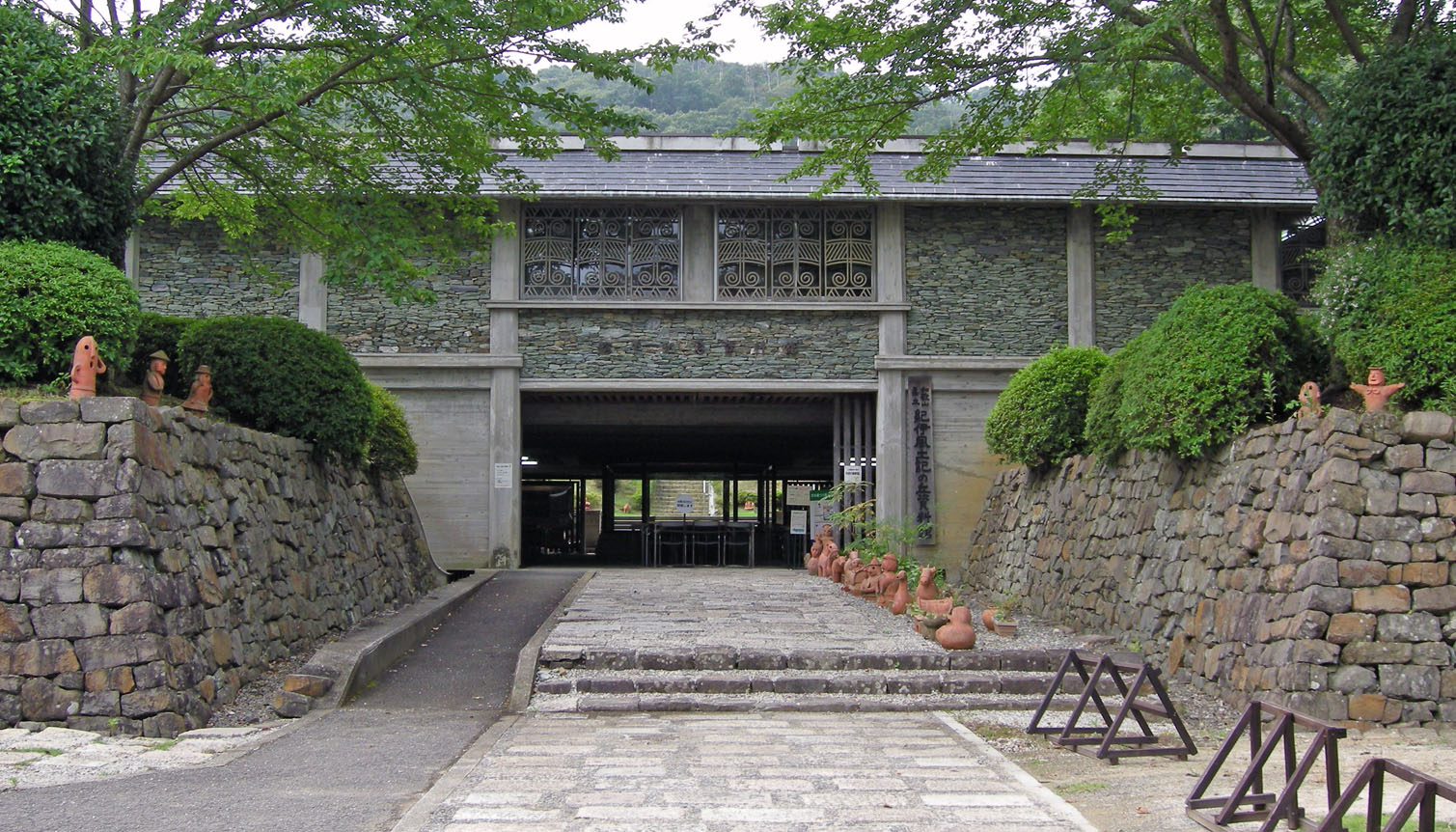
- Wakayama Prefecture Kii-fudoki-no-oka Museum of Archaeology and Folklore
- Interactive map of the Wakayama Prefecture Kii-fudoki-no-oka Museum of Archaeology and Folklore area

General information
- Location: 1411 Iwase, Wakayama, Wakayama Prefecture, Japan
- Coordinates: 34°13′40″N 135°13′47″E
- Opened: August 1971

Technical details
- Floor area: 1,687m2

Website
- ja

Wakayama Prefecture Kii-fudoki-no-oka Museum of Archaeology and Folklore (和歌山県立紀伊風土記の丘, Wakayama kenritsu fudoki-no-oka) is an archaeology museum located in the outskirts of the city of Wakayama, Wakayama Prefecture, Japan.

It was opened in August 1971 with the main purpose of preserving, researching, and displaying artifacts from the Iwase-Senzuka Kofun Cluster, a Special National Historic Site.

The museum encompasses a 65 hectare area containing about 400 kofun burial mounds, restored pit dwellings, relocated old folk houses of the Edo period (including two which are designated Important Cultural Properties, and a botanical garden.

The museum building itself was built by donations from Matsushita Konosuke, the industrialist who founded Panasonic, and is styled after a raised-floor warehouse from the Yayoi period, and is covered with the same type of stone used in the burial chambers of the tumuli in the adjacent Iwase-Senzuka Kofun Cluster.

The museum contains items excavated from these kofun, as well as pottery excavated from the ruins of Negoro-ji and other locations and folk implements.

== Gallery ==
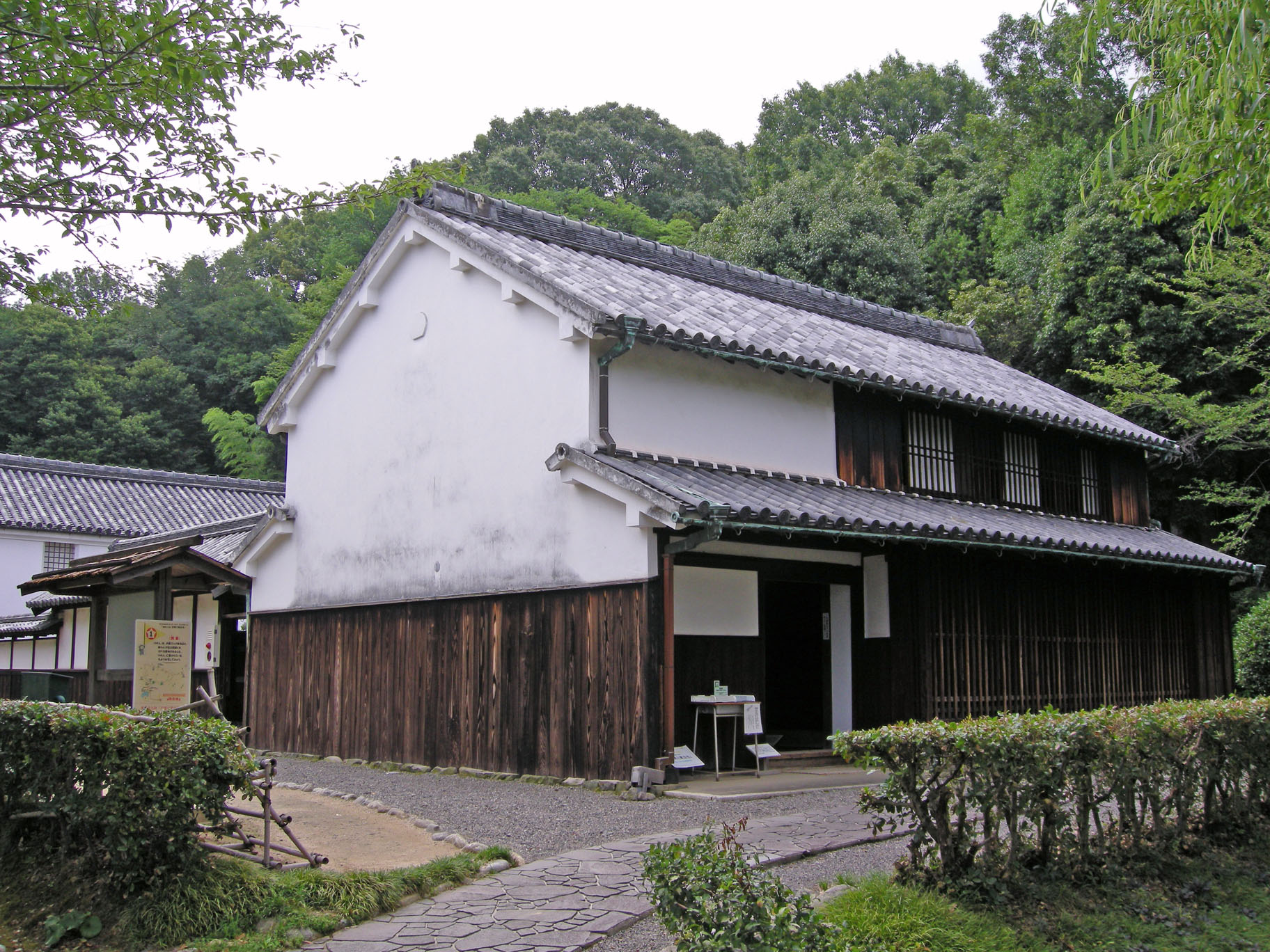
Yanagawa house (ICP)

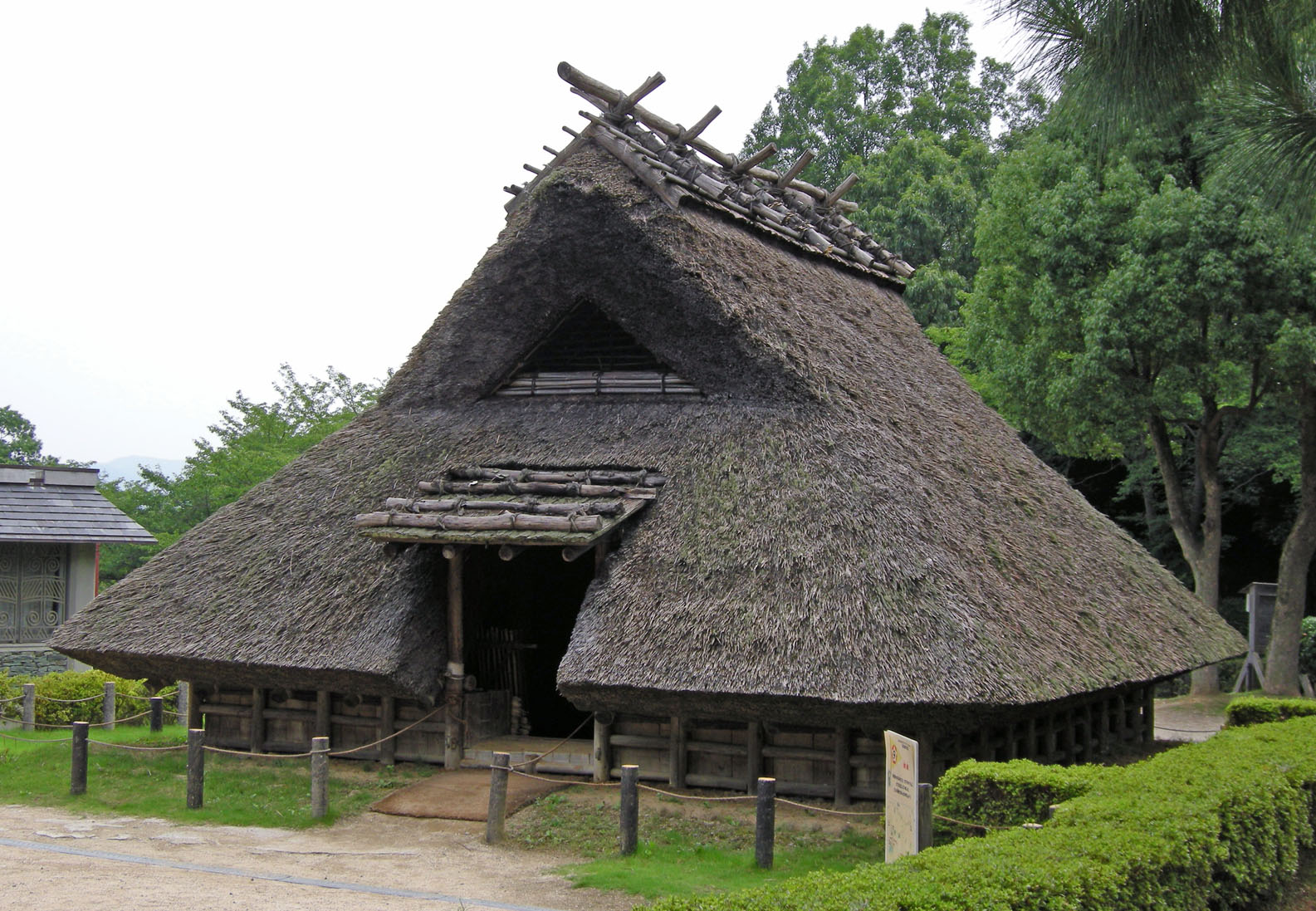
restored pit dwelling

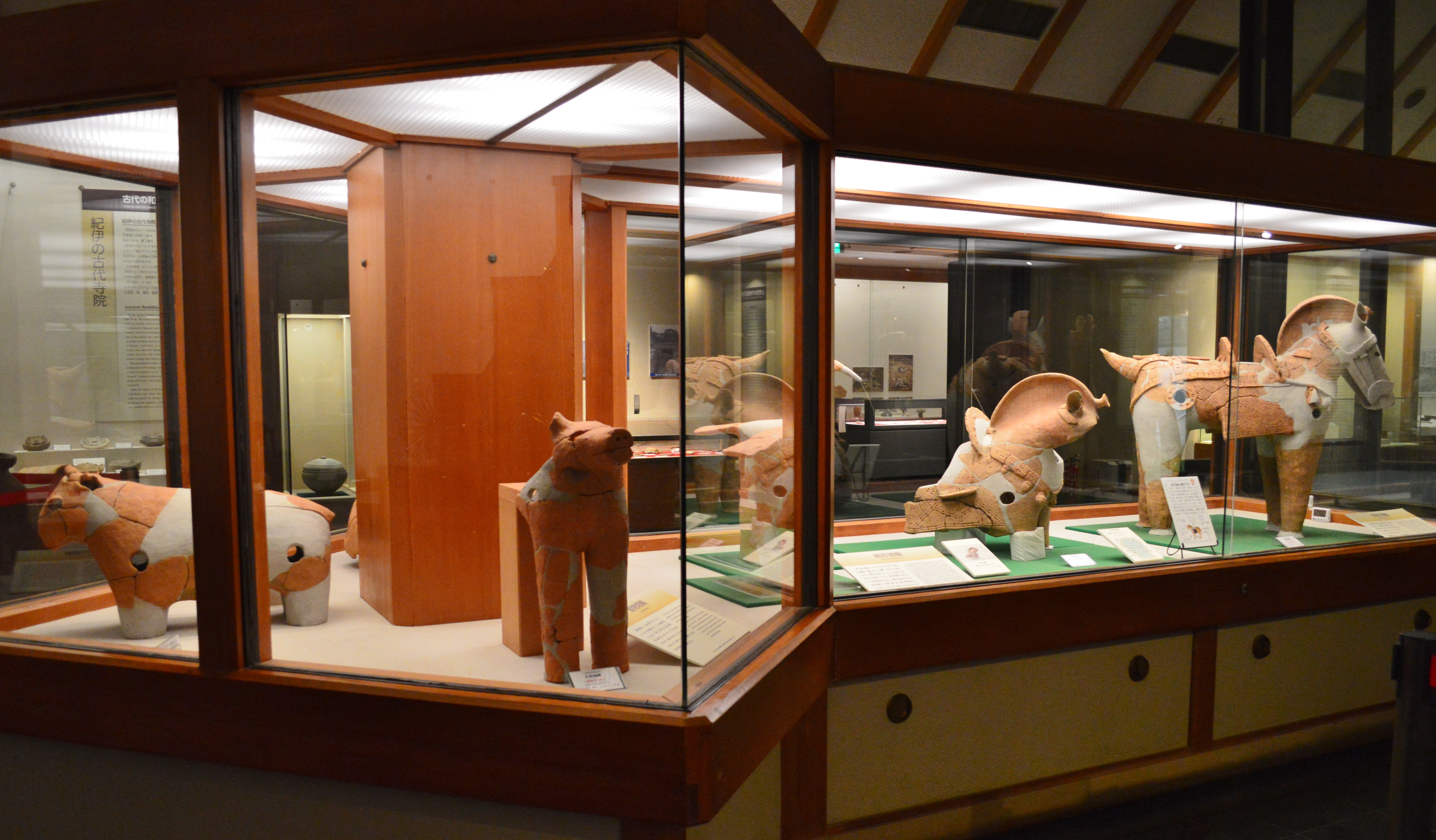
Kofun period materials from Dainichiyama No.35 Kofun

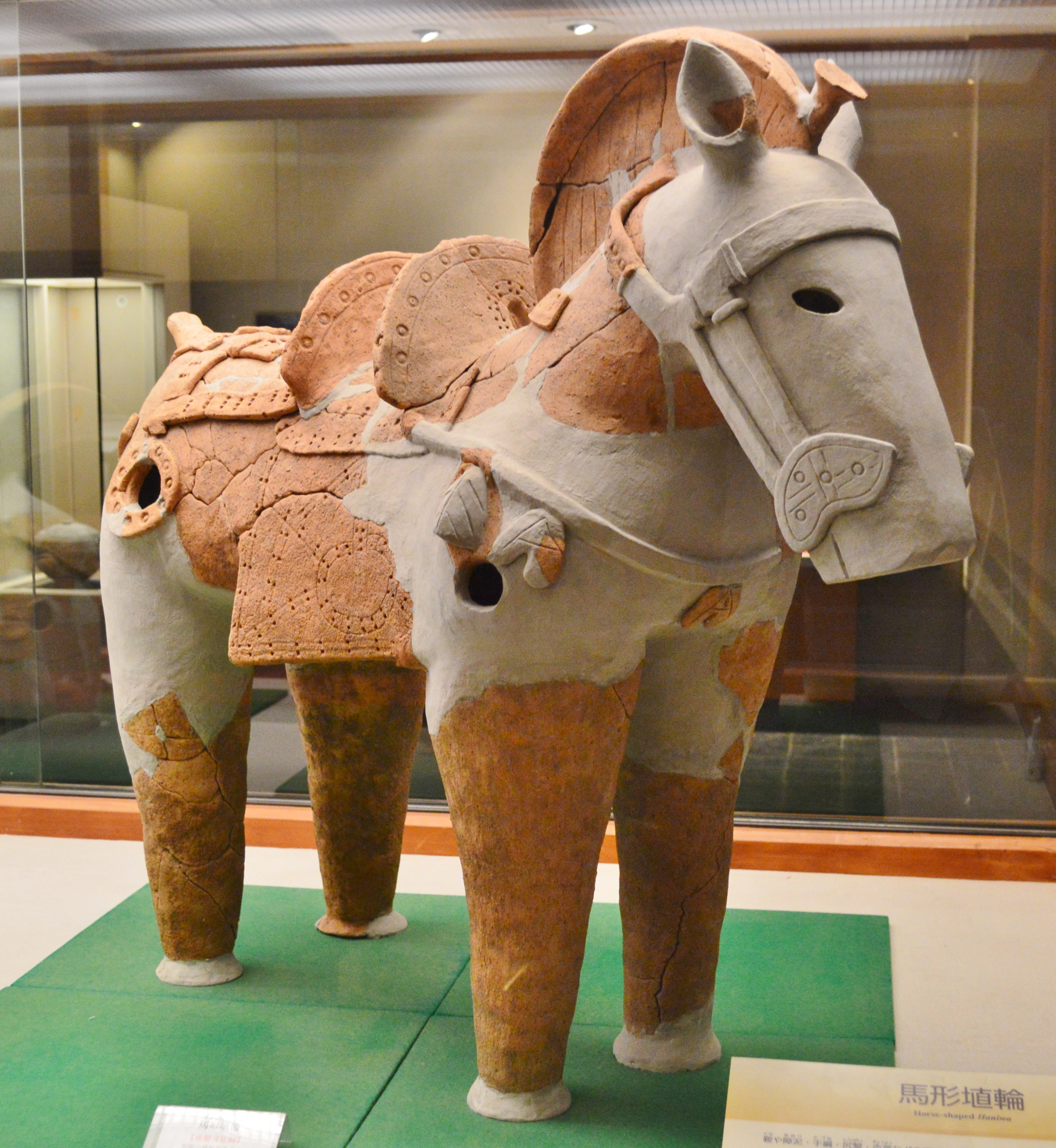
Fragments of haniwa

== See also ==
- Wakayama Prefectural Museum
- List of Cultural Properties of Japan - archaeological materials (Wakayama)
