= Ukui Station =

Railway station in Nachikatsuura, Wakayama Prefecture, Japan

Ukui Station 宇久井駅
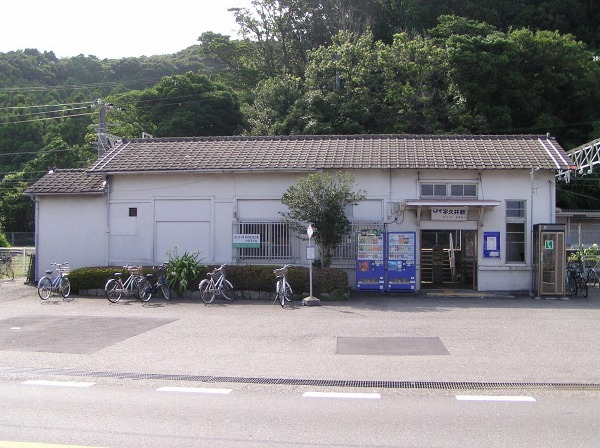
- Ukui Station, August 2005

General information
- Location: 62-4, Ugui, Nachikatsuura-mach, Higashimuro-gun, Wakayama-ken 649-5312; Japan
- Coordinates: 33°39′45″N 135°58′21″E
- System: JR-West commuter rail station
- Owner: West Japan Railway Company
- Operator: West Japan Railway Company
- Line: W Kisei Main Line (Kinokuni Line)
- Distance: 188.7 km (117.3 miles) from Kameyama; 8.5 km (5.3 miles) from Shingū
- Platforms: 2 side platforms
- Tracks: 2
- Train operators: West Japan Railway Company

Construction
- Structure type: At grade
- Accessible: None

Other information
- Website: Official website

History
- Opened: 4 December 1912
- Electrified: 1978

Passengers
- FY2019: 64 daily
Services
| Preceding station | JR-West | Following station |
W Kisei Main Line (Kinokuni Line)
| Kii-Sano; Toward Shingū | Local | Nachi; Toward Kii-Katsuura, Kii-Tanabe and Wakayama |
Location
- Location within Wakayama Prefecture Location within Japan

Ukui Station (宇久井駅, Ukui-ekii) is a passenger railway station in located in the town of Nachikatsuura, Higashimuro District, Wakayama Prefecture, Japan, operated by West Japan Railway Company (JR West).

== Lines ==
Ukui Station is served by the Kisei Main Line (Kinokuni Line), and is located 188.7 kilometers from the terminus of the line at Kameyama Station and 8.5 kilometers from Shingū.

== Station layout ==
The station consists of two opposed side platforms connected to the station building by a footbridge. The station is unattended.

=== Platforms ===
| 1 | ■ Kisei Main Line | for Kii-Katsuura, Kii-Tanabe and Wakayama |
| 2 | ■ Kisei Main Line | for Shingū |

== Adjacent stations ==
| « | Service | » |
West Japan Railway Company (JR West)
Kisei Main Line
Limited Express Nanki: Does not stop at this station
Limited Express Kuroshio: Does not stop at this station
| Kii-Sano | Local | Nachi |

== History ==
Ukui Station opened as Ugui Station on the Shingu Railway on December 4, 1912. The Shingu Railway was nationalized on July 1, 1934, and the station was renamed "Ukui" at that time. With the privatization of the Japan National Railways (JNR( on April 1, 1987, the station came under the aegis of the West Japan Railway Company.

== Passenger statistics ==
In fiscal 2019, the station was used by an average of 64 passengers daily (boarding passengers only).

== Surrounding Area ==
- National Route 42
- Nachikatsuura City Ukui Elementary School

== See also ==
- List of railway stations in Japan
