= Kumano shrine =

Type of Japanese temple

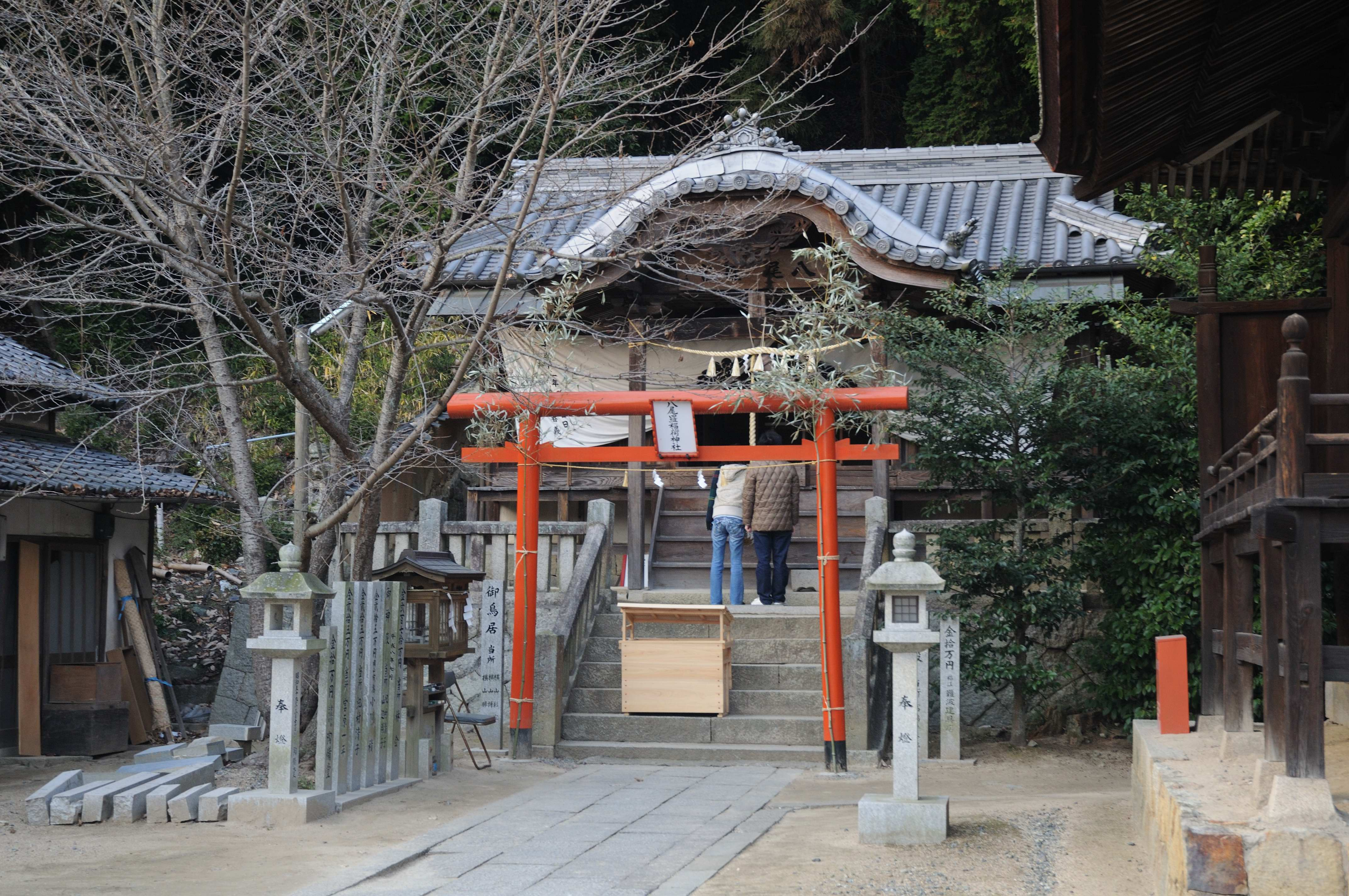
A Kumano shrine in Kurashiki, Okayama

A Kumano shrine (熊野神社, Kumano Jinja) is a type of Shinto shrine that enshrines the three Kumano mountains of the Kii Peninsula: Hongū, Shingū, and Nachi [Kumano Gongen (熊野権現)] There are more than 3,000 Kumano shrines in Japan, each of which has received its kami from another Kumano shrine through a process of propagation called bunrei (分霊) or kanjō (勧請).

The origin of the Kumano cult is the Kumano Sanzan shrine complex in Wakayama Prefecture, which comprises Kumano Hayatama Taisha (熊野速玉大社) (Shingū, Wakayama), Kumano Hongū Taisha (Tanabe, Wakayama) and Kumano Nachi Taisha (Nachikatsuura, Wakayama Prefecture).

== Kumano Sanzan ==
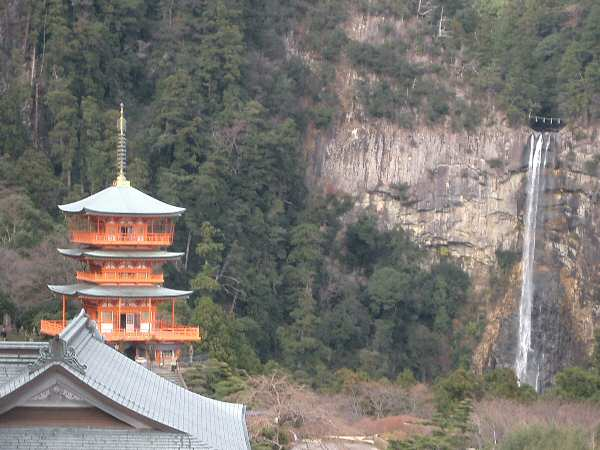
Nachi Falls and Seiganto-ji

The three Kumano Sanzan shrines are the Sōhonsha ("head shrines") of all Kumano shrines and lie between 20 and 40 km from each other. They are connected by the pilgrimage route known as Kumano Kodō (熊野古道). The great Kumano Sanzan complex also includes two Buddhist temples, Seiganto-ji and Fudarakusan-ji.

The religious significance of the Kumano region goes back to prehistoric times and therefore predates all modern religions in Japan. The area is still considered a place of physical healing. Each shrine initially had its own separate form of nature worship. In the 10th century, under the influence of Buddhism, the three came to be worshiped together as the three deities of Kumano. Because at the time Japanese kami were believed to be emanations of buddhas (honji suijaku theory), the three came to be associated with Buddhas. Kuniyasutamahime became associated with Sahasrabhūja Avalokiteśvara (Senju Kannon, "Thousand-Armed Avalokiteśvara"), Bhaisajyaguru (Yakushi Nyōrai) and Amitābha (Amida Nyōrai).

The site became a unique example of shinbutsu-shūgō, the fusion between Buddhism and Japanese indigenous religion. The Kumano Sanzan site attracted many worshipers and became a popular pilgrimage destination. In the 11th century, most pilgrims were members of the imperial family or aristocrats, but four centuries later they were mostly commoners. The visit was referred to as the "Kumano ant pilgrimage" (蟻の熊野参り; Ari no Kumano mairi), because the long lines of pilgrims through the valleys like so many ants.

== See also ==
- Acts of Worship
- Kumano Shrine (Yamagata)
- The Tale of the Heike

== General and cited references ==
- Moerman, D. Max (2004). Localizing Paradise: Kumano Pilgrimage and the Religious Landscape of Premodern Japan. Harvard University Press. ISBN 0674013956.https://www.jstor.org/journal/japajrelistud
- Moerman, David (1997). "The Ideology of Landscape and the Theater of State: Insei Pilgrimage to Kumano (1090–1220)". Japanese Journal of Religious Studies 24 (3–4), 347–374
