= Wakayama City Museum =

- 和歌山市立博物館
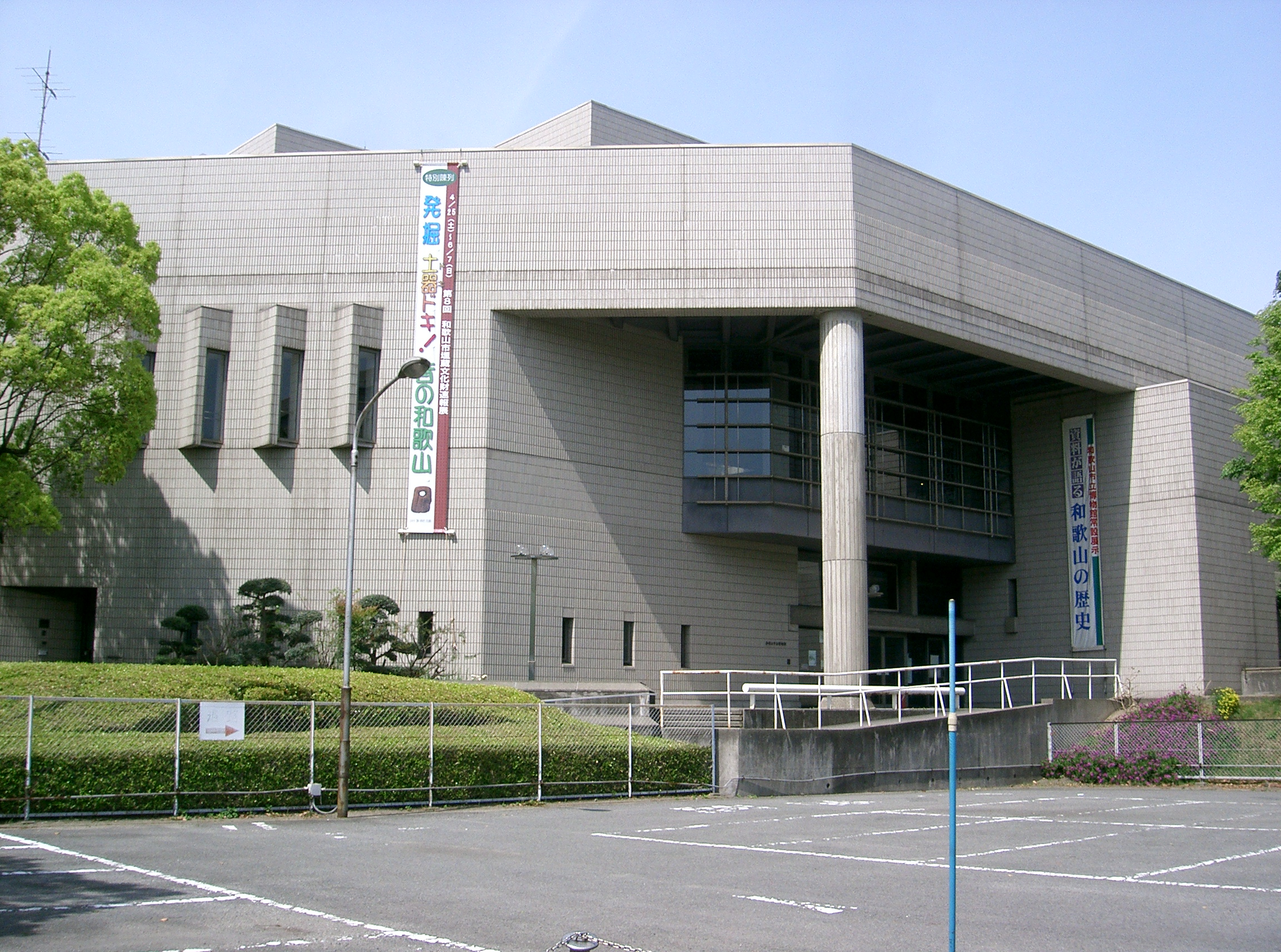
- Wakayama City Museum
- Interactive map of the Wakayama City Museum area

General information
- Location: 3-2 Minatohonmachi, Wakayama, Wakayama Prefecture, Japan
- Coordinates: 34°13′59″N 135°09′47″E
- Opened: November 1985

Website
- Official website

Wakayama City Museum (和歌山市立博物館, Wakayama shiritsu hakubutsukan) is a local history museum located in the city of Wakayama, Wakayama Prefecture, Japan. It opened in November 1985 to commemorate the 400th anniversary of the construction of Wakayama Castle. The facility is adjacent to the Wakayama Civic Library. In the permanent exhibition room, there are exhibits related to the cultural history of Wakayama city from the prehistoric period through the postwar reconstruction period, as well as many materials pertaining to the Kishū Tokugawa clan, who ruled as daimyō of Kishū Domain under the Edo Period Tokugawa Shogunate.

== See also ==
- Wakayama Prefectural Museum
