= Nachi Falls =

Kumano Sanzan - Nachi no Ōtaki
UNESCO World Heritage Site
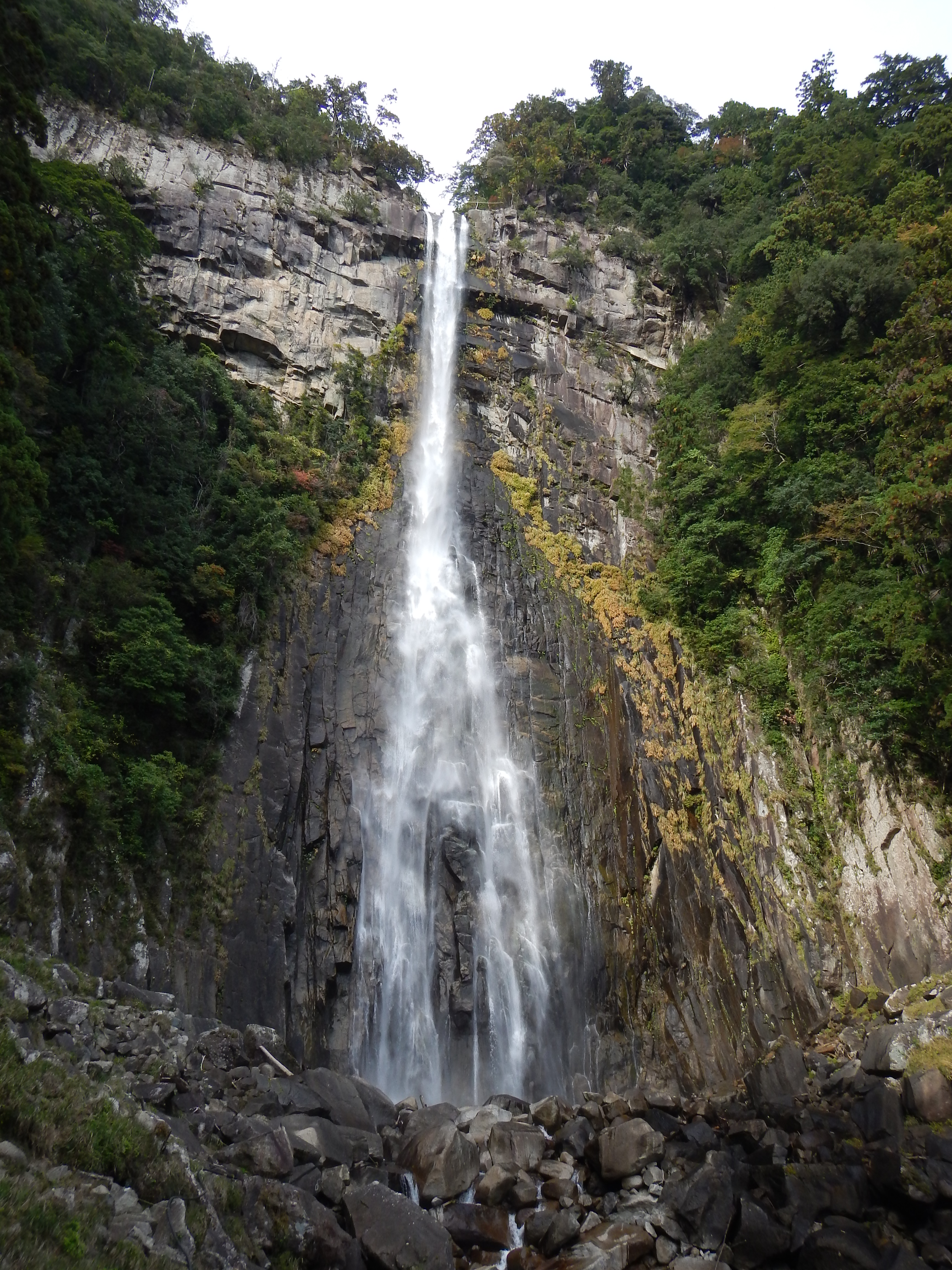

- Location within Japan
- Location: Nachikatsuura, Higashimuro District, Wakayama Prefecture, Kii Peninsula, Kii Province, Honshu, Japan
- Part of: Sacred Sites and Pilgrimage Routes in the Kii Mountain Range
- Criteria: Cultural: (ii), (iii), (iv), (vi)
- Reference: 1142bis-011
- Inscription: 2004 (28th Session)
- Extensions: 2016
- Area: 2.5 ha (6.2 acres)
- Coordinates: 33°40′19″N 135°53′28″E

Nachi Falls (那智滝, Nachi no Taki) in Nachikatsuura, Wakayama Prefecture, Japan, is one of the best-known waterfalls in Japan. With a drop of 133 metres (436 ft) and 13 metres (43 ft) wide, it is the tallest waterfall with a single uninterrupted drop in Japan (although Japan also disputes Russia's right to Iturup Island, which has the 141 m (463 ft) high Ilya Muromets Waterfall); however, the tallest Japanese waterfalls with multiple drops are Hannoki Falls, at 497 m (1,631 ft) (seasonal), and Shōmyō Falls, at 350 m (1,150 ft) (year round).

There are two rocks at the top of the falls that are the guardian kami of the falls and the Shinto shrine. There was also a Buddhist temple here that was destroyed during the Meiji Restoration (late 19th century). Many shugenja and star-crossed lovers have leaped from the top of the waterfall in the belief that they will be reborn into Kannon's paradise. Early each morning, the Shinto priest makes offerings to the waterfall in a ritual. In 1918, a Sutra mound was excavated at the base of the waterfall and found to contain many important archaeological artifacts, including statues, mirrors, altar fittings and Sutra cylinders. These are now displayed in the Ryuhoden (“Treasure Hall”), located next to the Sanjūdō Pagoda (the 3-story pagoda). These Sutra mounds were created by priests in times of war to hide their treasures but also many items were buried in this way as a result of the belief that the end of the world was coming at the start of the 10th century.

Believed to house a kami called Hiryū Gongen worshiped at Kumano Nachi Taisha, it is part of the "Sacred Sites and Pilgrimage Routes in the Kii Mountain Range" UNESCO World Heritage Site.

Hanging scroll of the Kamakura period (13th–14th century) depicting the falls

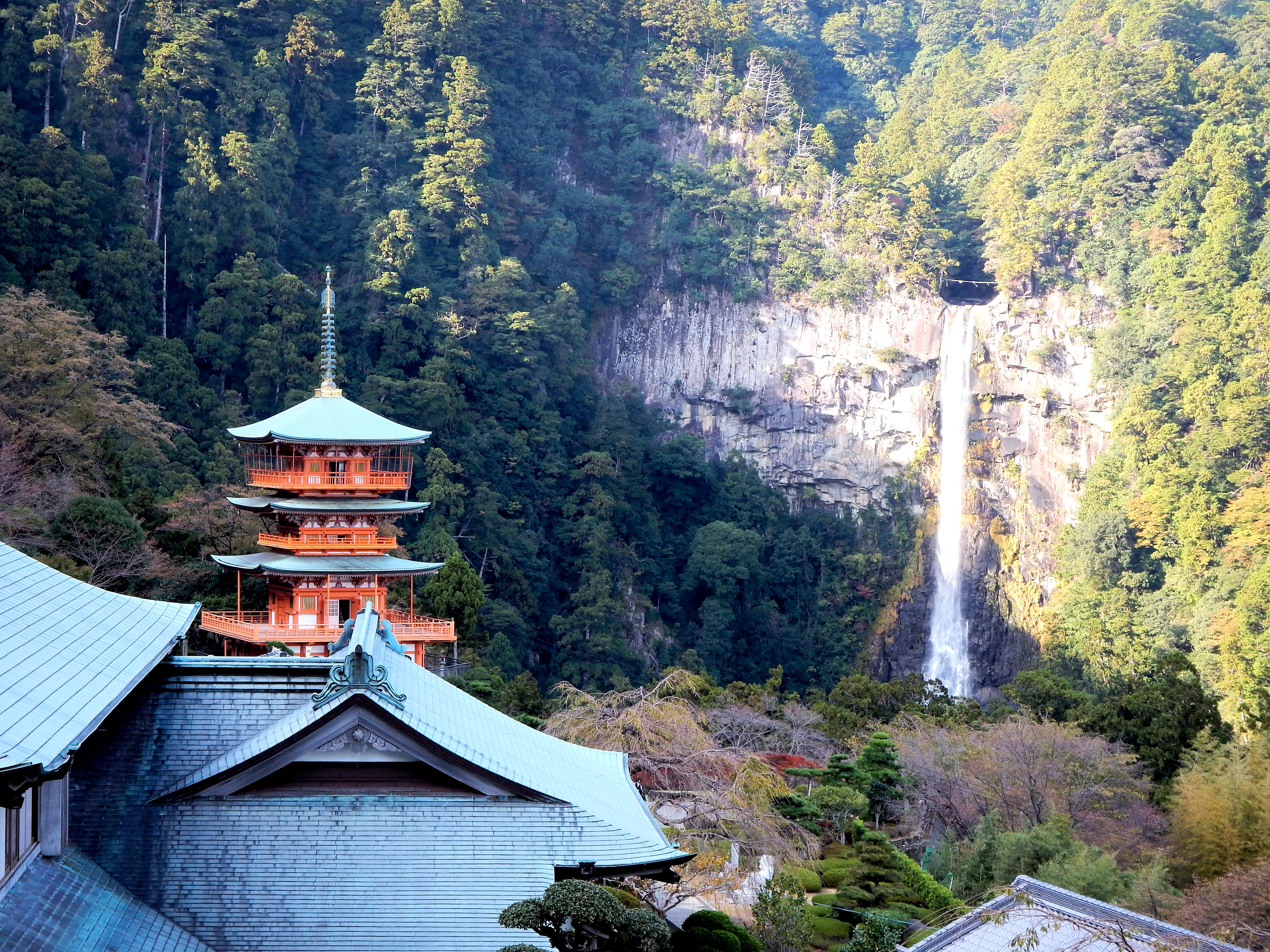
Seiganto-ji and Nachi Waterfall

Nachi Falls in summer, 2010

== See also ==
- List of waterfalls
- List of waterfalls in Japan
- Tourism in Japan
