= Kumano Nachi Taisha =

Shinto shrine in Nachikatsuura, Japan

Kumano Nachi Taisha (熊野那智大社)
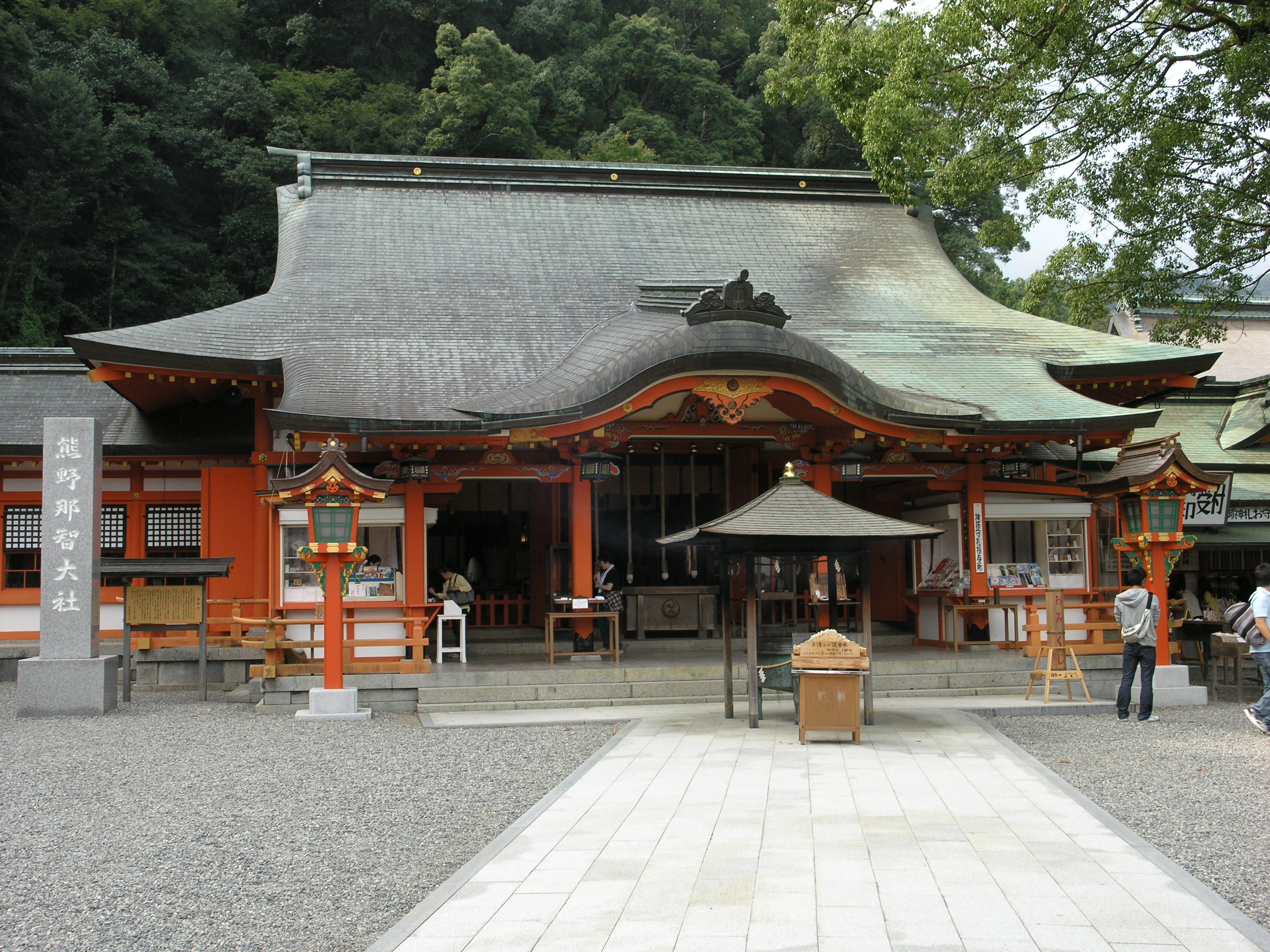
- Kumano Nachi Taisha's heiden

- Location within Japan

Religion
- Affiliation: Shinto
- Deity: Fusumi no kami (Izanami no mikoto) and others

Location
- Location: Nachikatsuura, Higashimuro District, Wakayama Prefecture, Japan
- Coordinates: 33°40′07″N 135°53′26″E

Kumano Nachi Taisha (熊野那智大社) is a Shinto shrine and part of the UNESCO-designated World Heritage Sacred Sites and Pilgrimage Routes in the Kii Mountain Range of Japan. The Kumano Kodō route connects it to other sites under the same classification, which are primarily located in Wakayama Prefecture, Japan. The four sites on the route, classified as pilgrimage destinations and World Heritage Sites, are: 1) Nachi Taisha; 2) Hongū Taisha; 3) Hayatama Taisha; 4) Koya-san.

Kumano Nachi Taisha is also one of the three sacred Kumano Sanzan shrines:

1. Kumano Nachi Taisha
2. Kumano Hongū Taisha
3. Kumano Hayatama Taisha

This classification is based mostly in Japanese history, as pilgrims would travel to all three sites to complete their pilgrimage.

Kumano Nachi Taisha is an example of Buddhist and Shinto syncretism (Shinbutsu shūgō) nestled in the Kii Mountains, near Kii Katsuura, Japan. Cedar forests surround the site. The 133-meter Nachi Waterfall, worshiped at the Hiryū Shrine near Kumano Nachi Taisha, is believed to be inhabited by a kami called Hiryū Gongen. Also, there is a sacred tree at this site, the Sacred Camphor Tree, located between the Nachi Shrine (heiden) and Seigantoji temple. It is 850 years old and is said to have been planted by Taira-no-Shigemori (1138–1179). The straw rope (shimenawa) and paper flags show that this tree has been sanctified as a kami. The tree is alive with moss and ferns and other small plants growing on its ancient limbs. It is possible to enter the base of the tree, where there is a small altar for making offerings, and come out above ground level.

Nachi-no-Hi Matsuri Fire Festival, performed on July 14, is the major festival of Kumano Nachi Taisha. It is a fire festival in which six-meter-high portable shrines symbolically representing the purification of the waterfall with the fires from oversized torches is laboriously carried by men dressed in white.

== See also ==
- List of Shinto shrines
- Twenty-Two Shrines
- Modern system of ranked Shinto Shrines

== Gallery ==
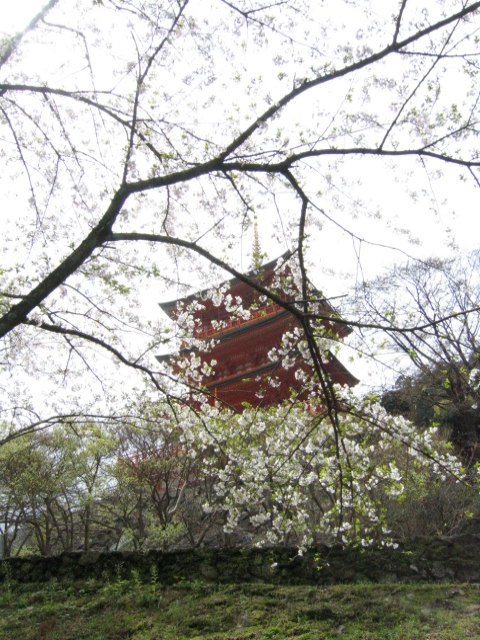
Nachi-san Pagoda

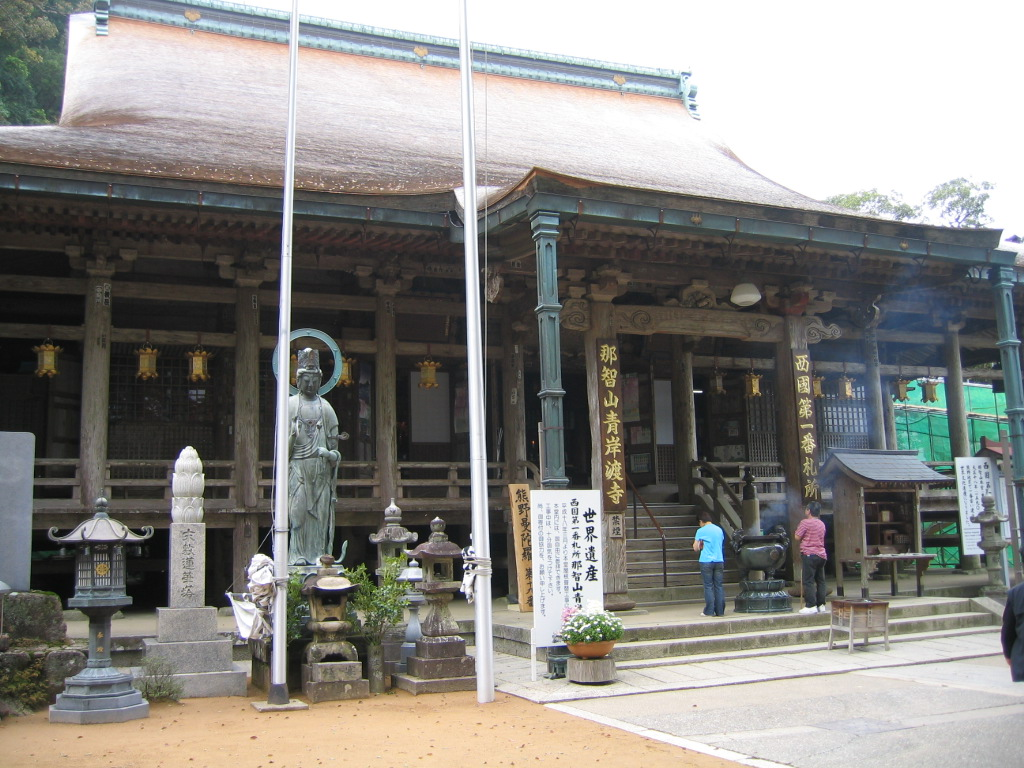
Nachi Taisha's main temple

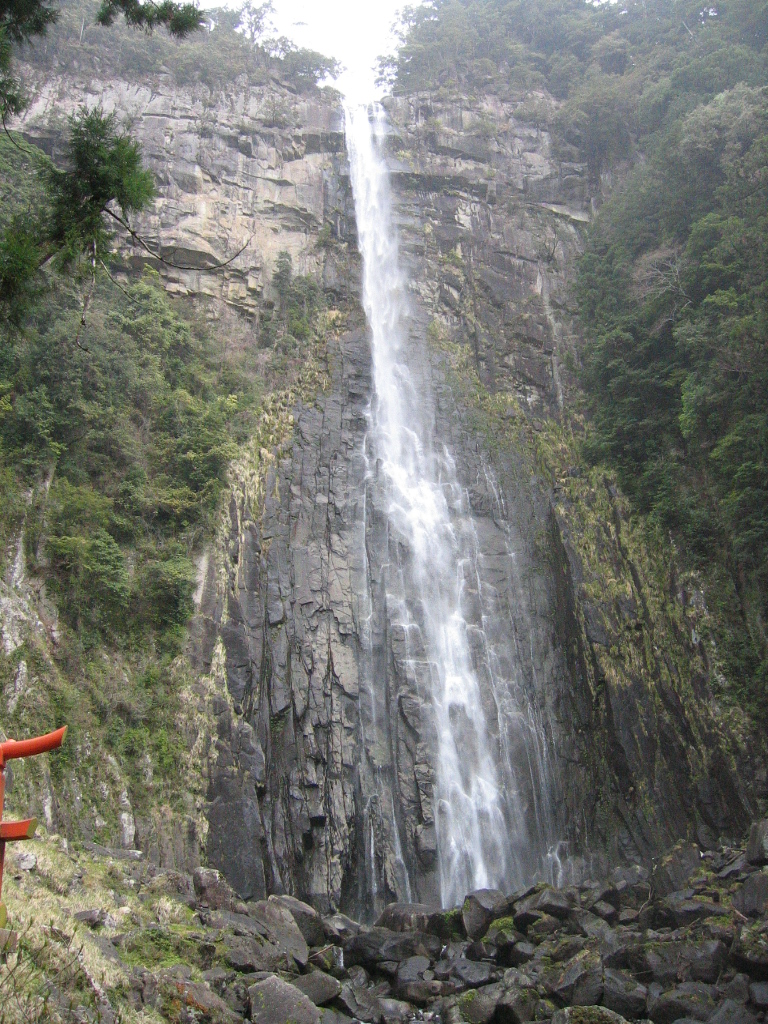
Nachi waterfall

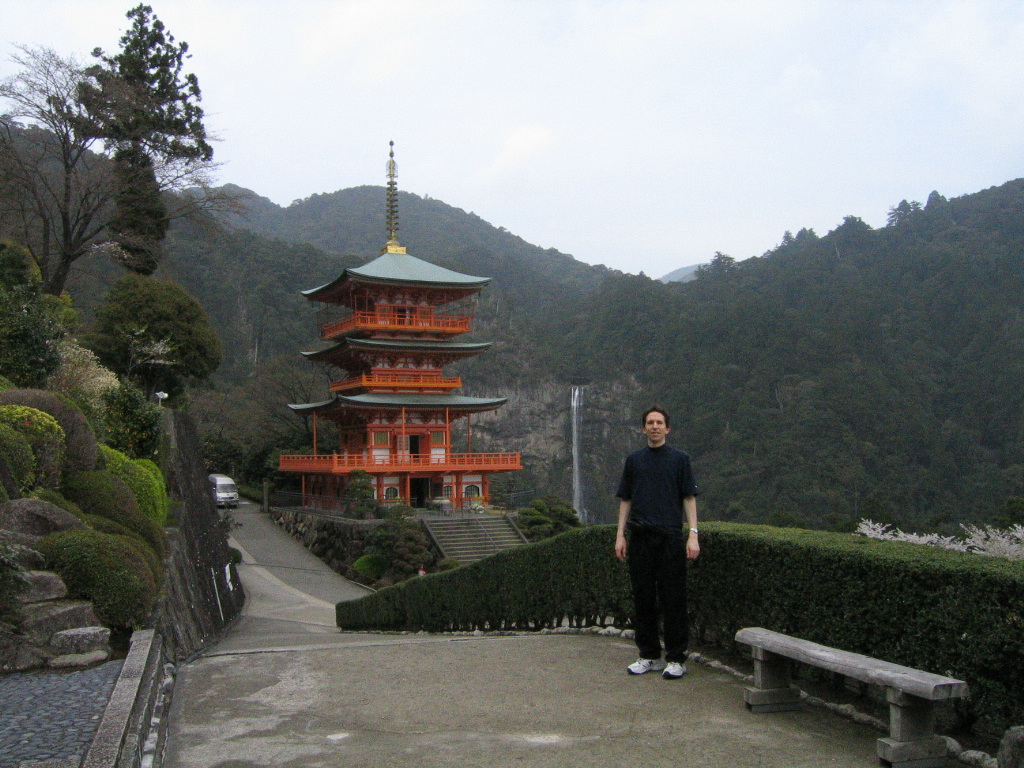
Sanjūdō pagoda, Nachi Taisha
