= Seiganto-ji =

Buddhist temple in Wakayama, Japan

- 青岸渡寺
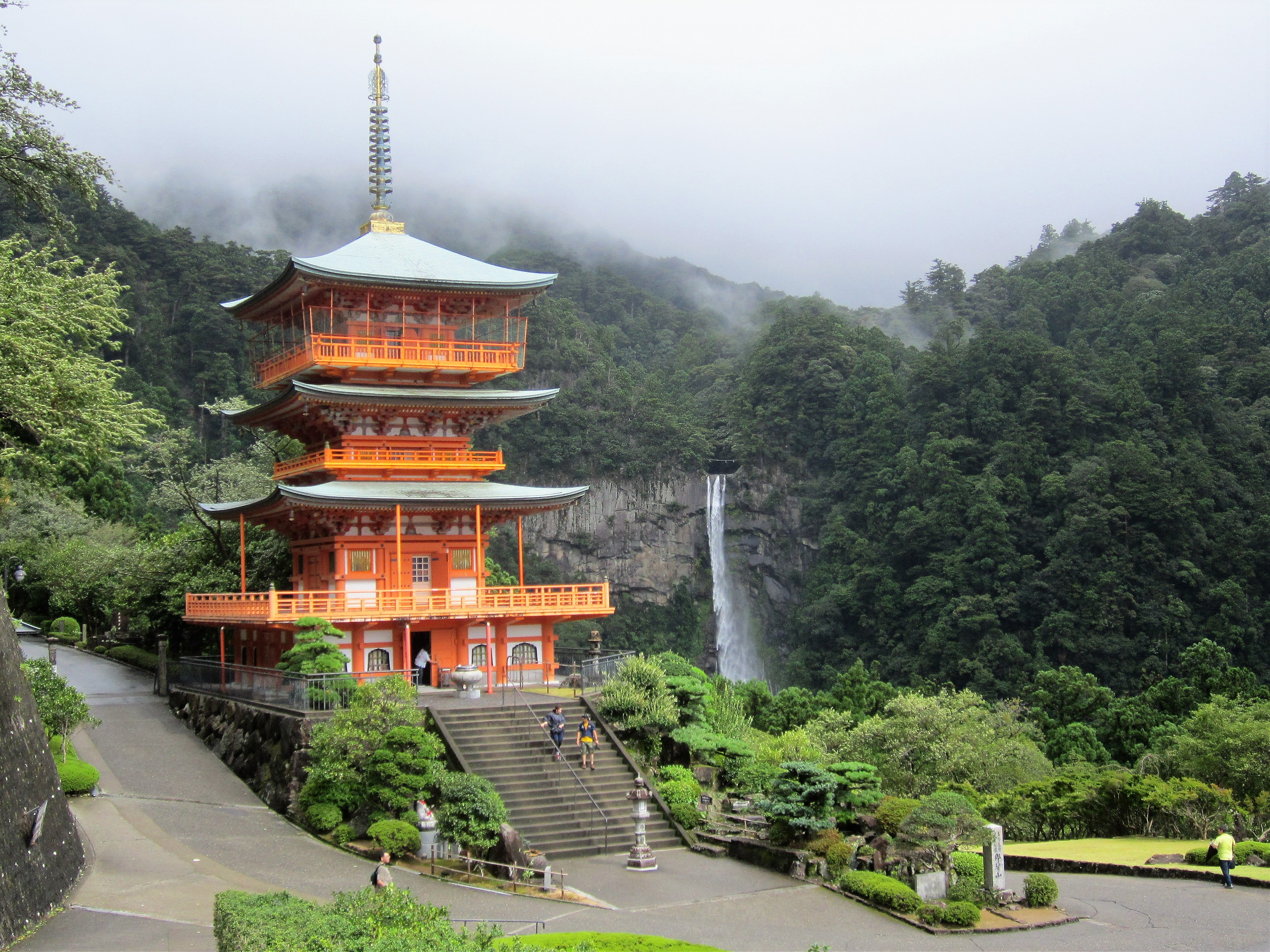
- Three-story pagoda with Nachi Falls in the background

- Location within Japan

Religion
- Affiliation: Tendai
- Deity: Nyoirin Kannon (Chintamanicakra)

Location
- Location: 8 Nachisan, Nachikatsuura-chō, Higashimuro-gun, Wakayama Prefecture
- Country: Japan
- Coordinates: 33.6694°N 135.8898°E

Architecture
- Founder: Ragyō Shōnin
- Completed: 4th century (presumed legendary)
- UNESCO World Heritage Site
- Type: Cultural
- Criteria: ii, iii, iv, vi
- Designated: 2004 (28th session)
- Reference no.: 1142bis
- Part of: Sacred Sites and Pilgrimage Routes in the Kii Mountain Range

Seiganto-ji (青岸渡寺) (lit. 'Temple of Crossing the Blue Shore') is a Tendai Buddhist temple in Wakayama Prefecture, Japan. It was designated a UNESCO World Heritage Site in 2004 as part of Sacred Sites and Pilgrimage Routes in the Kii Mountain Range. According to a legend, it was founded by Ragyō Shōnin, a monk from India. The temple was purposely built near Nachi Falls, where it may have previously been a site of nature worship. Seiganto-ji, part of the Kumano Sanzan shrine complex, is one of the few remaining jingū-ji or shrine temples following the forcible separation of Shinto and Buddhism during the Meiji restoration.

It is the first stop on the Saigoku Kannon Pilgrimage and the main hall is classified as an Important Cultural Property by the Japanese government.

== History ==
During the reign of Emperor Nintoku (313 – 399), according to temple legend, Ragyō Shōnin, a monk from India, came here following the river in search of a suitable place in which to practice his austerities and found Nachi waterfall. After practicing shugyō, Kannon appeared to him at the base of the waterfall and so he built a hermitage dedicated to Kannon in this place.

During the reign of Empress Suiko (592 – 628), Shōbutsu Shōnin came here from Yamato in order to undergo austerity practices. At that time he carved a 4 meter high image of Nyoirin Kannon from a single piece of camellia tree. The Hondō (main temple) was built to enshrine this image which became the focus of the Nachi Kannon cult and is the image that is enshrined in the present Nyorindō.

In 988 Emperor Kazan (花山天皇) (968-1008) visited the Kumano area on his first pilgrimage and, being deeply moved by the image of Kannon, he declared this Temple One of the Saigoku Kannon pilgrimage. It is said that Emperor Kazan completed 1000 days of severe spiritual training under the waterfall, after which he had a vision of Kannon in the form of the kami Kumano Gongen. The kami instructed the emperor to find the priest Butsugan of Hasedera (Temple 8 of the pilgrimage), who helped the emperor to remap out the current pilgrimage route.

Emperor Kazan wrote all the goeika poems that are still used throughout the pilgrimage as sacred hymns. It became a custom in later years for other emperors who went on this pilgrimage to also compose poems of their own for each of the sacred sites.

Because Emperor Go-Shirakawa (1127 – 1192; reigned 1155 – 1158) made the pilgrimage to Kumano 34 times and his successor Emperor Gotoba (1180-1239; r. 1183–1198) made it 31 times, the pilgrimage became popular during this era. However, members of court had been coming here for about 400 years prior to this, believing it was near to Kannon's paradise island located to the south of Japan called Fudaraku (Potala in Sanskrit).

The temple buildings, like many of the temples on the pilgrimage route, were burned to the ground by Oda Nobunaga during the civil wars of the 16th century. The Nyorindō (Main Temple) was rebuilt in 1587 by Toyotomi Hideyoshi, the Imperial Regent who unified Japan after the wars. It is typical of Momoyama Era style of architecture with a shingled distinctive roof called irimoya. The Nyorindō is heritage listed as a nationally Important Cultural Property.

When the government reinstated the power of the Emperor during the Meiji era (1868 - 1912), an attempt was made to separate Buddhist temples and Shinto shrines that had for over a thousand years shared the same grounds. Because of this, Seigantoji was formally abolished, the priests stripped of their authority and no funding was given to the temple. At that time Seigantoji had three main temples as well as 37 residential and training building. But all that remained after the Meiji Restoration was the Nyorindō and the abbot's quarters. However, gradually over the following century it was slowly rebuilt due to its position as an important part of the Kumano-Nachi syncretic mountain veneration religion of Shugendō.

In 1918, a Sutra mound was excavated at the base of the waterfall and found to contain many important archaeological artifacts, including statues, mirrors, altar fittings and Sutra cylinders. These are now displayed in the Ryuhoden (“Treasure Hall”), located next to the Pagoda. These Sutra mounds were created by priests in times of war to hide their treasures but also many items were buried in this way as a result of the belief that the end of the world was coming at the start of the 10th century.

== Buildings and other places of interest within the temple grounds ==
- Daimonsaka Forest Path
- Sanmon (Mountain Gate)
- Kumano Nachi Taisha shrine (heiden)
- Homotsuden Treasure Hall
- Nyoirindō (The Temple of the Wish-fulfilling Kannon), the main temple (Hondō)
- Sanjūdō pagoda (3-storey pagoda)
- Nachi-no-Taki (Nachi Waterfall)
- Nyohōdō (Hall of Lantern)
- Sonsho-in Abbot's Quarters
- Waniguchi "Crocodile Mouth" Gong
- Fudarakusan-ji

== Images ==
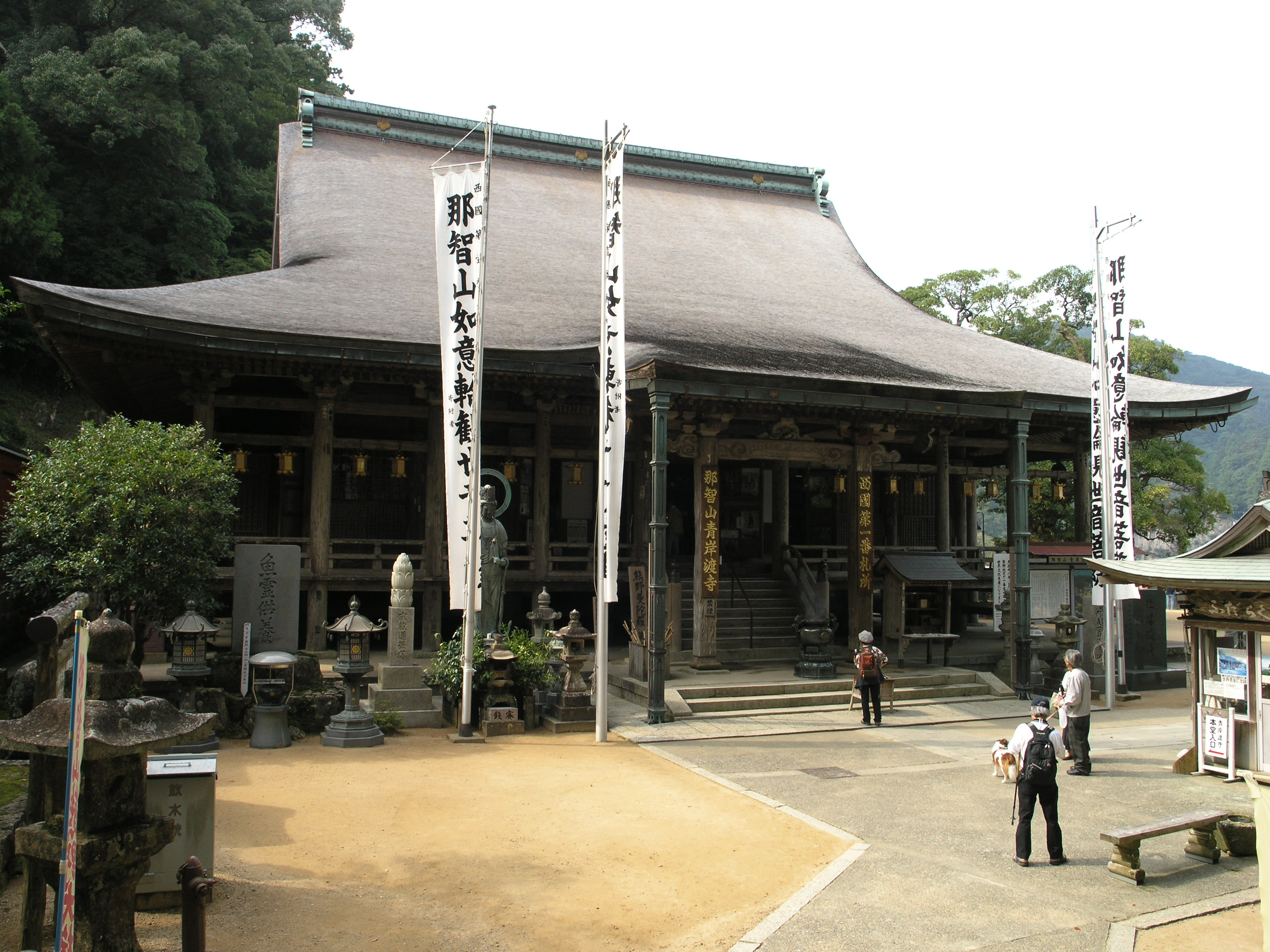
Hondō (Nyoirindō), the main hall

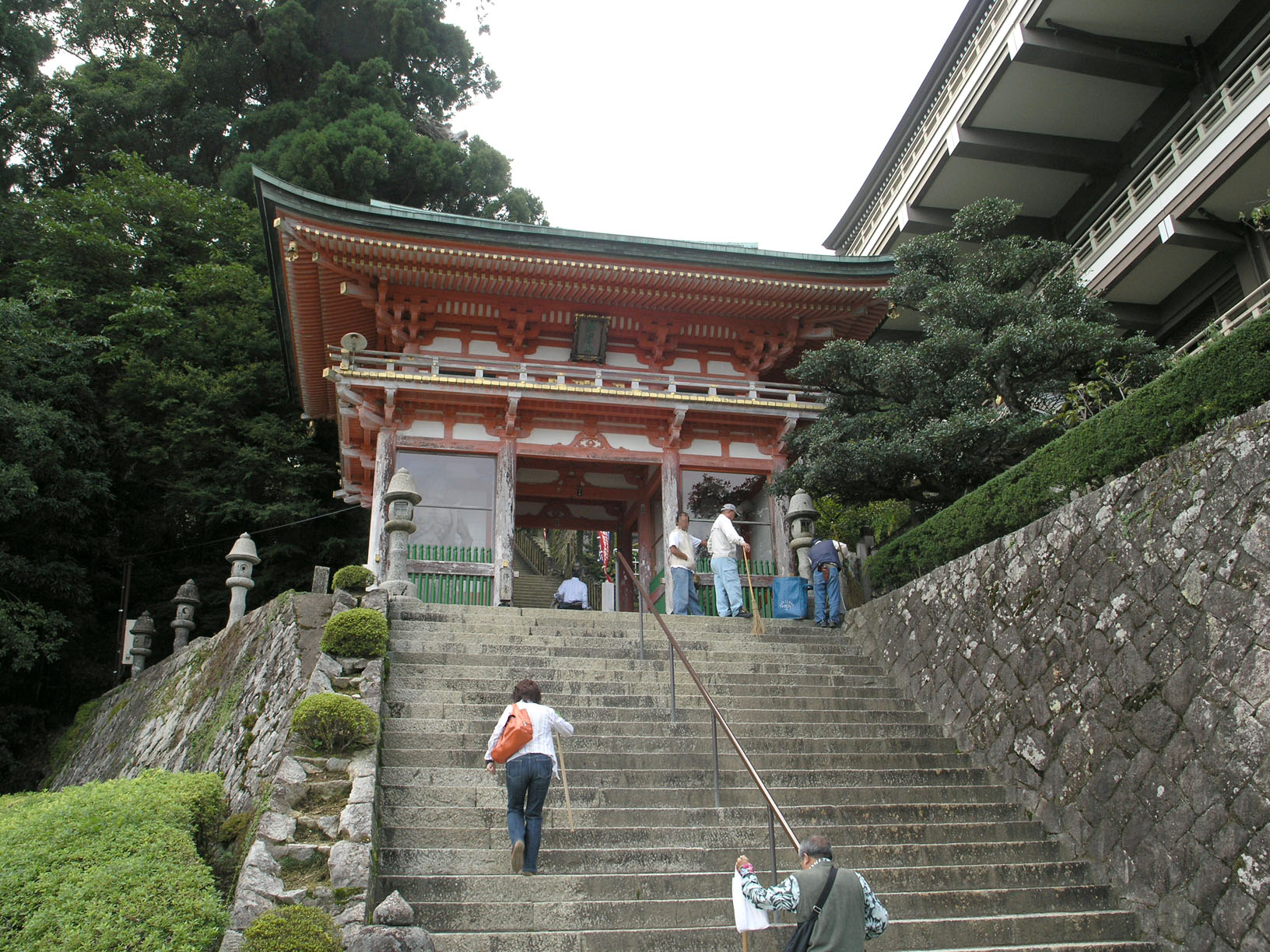
Main gate

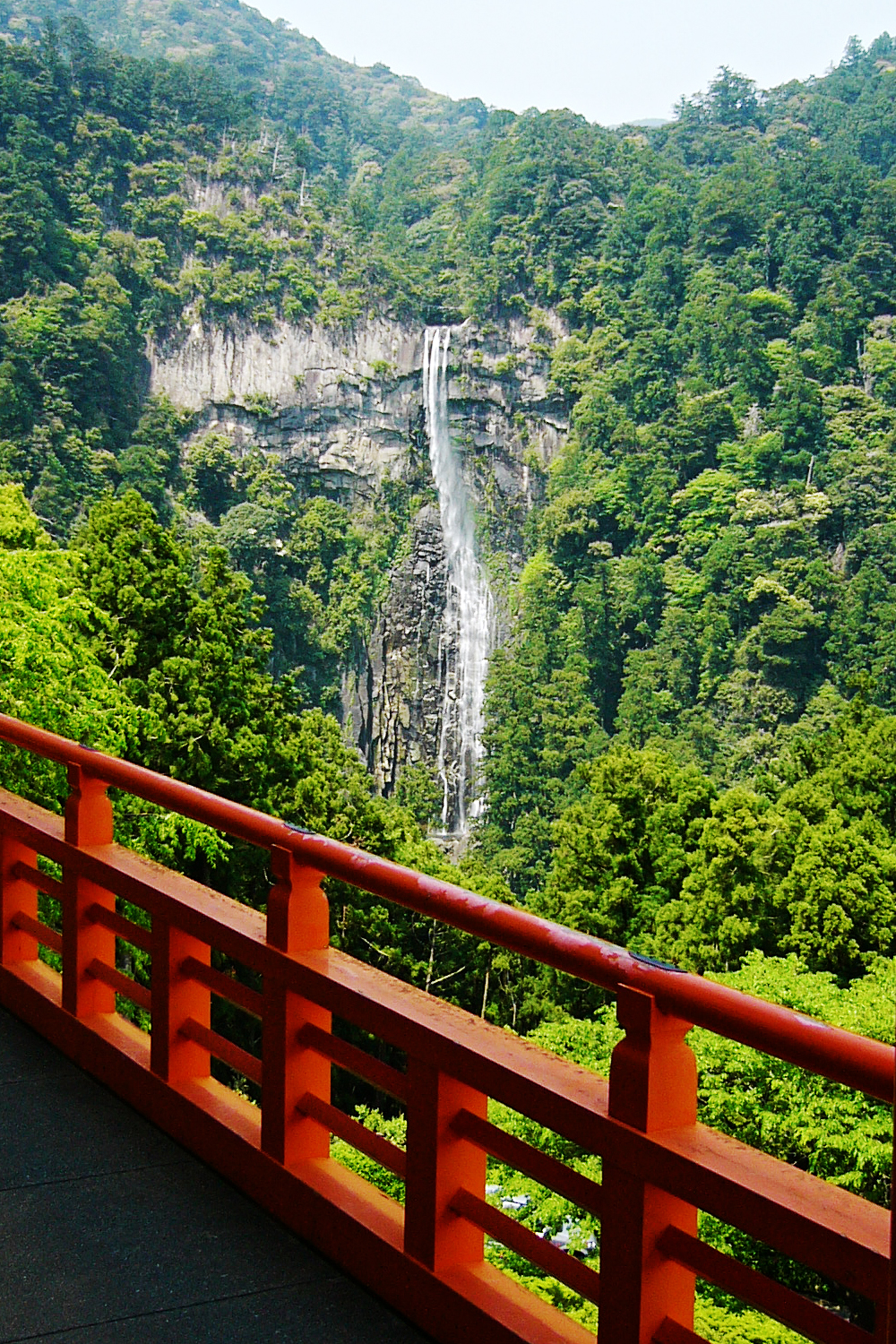
View from the terrace

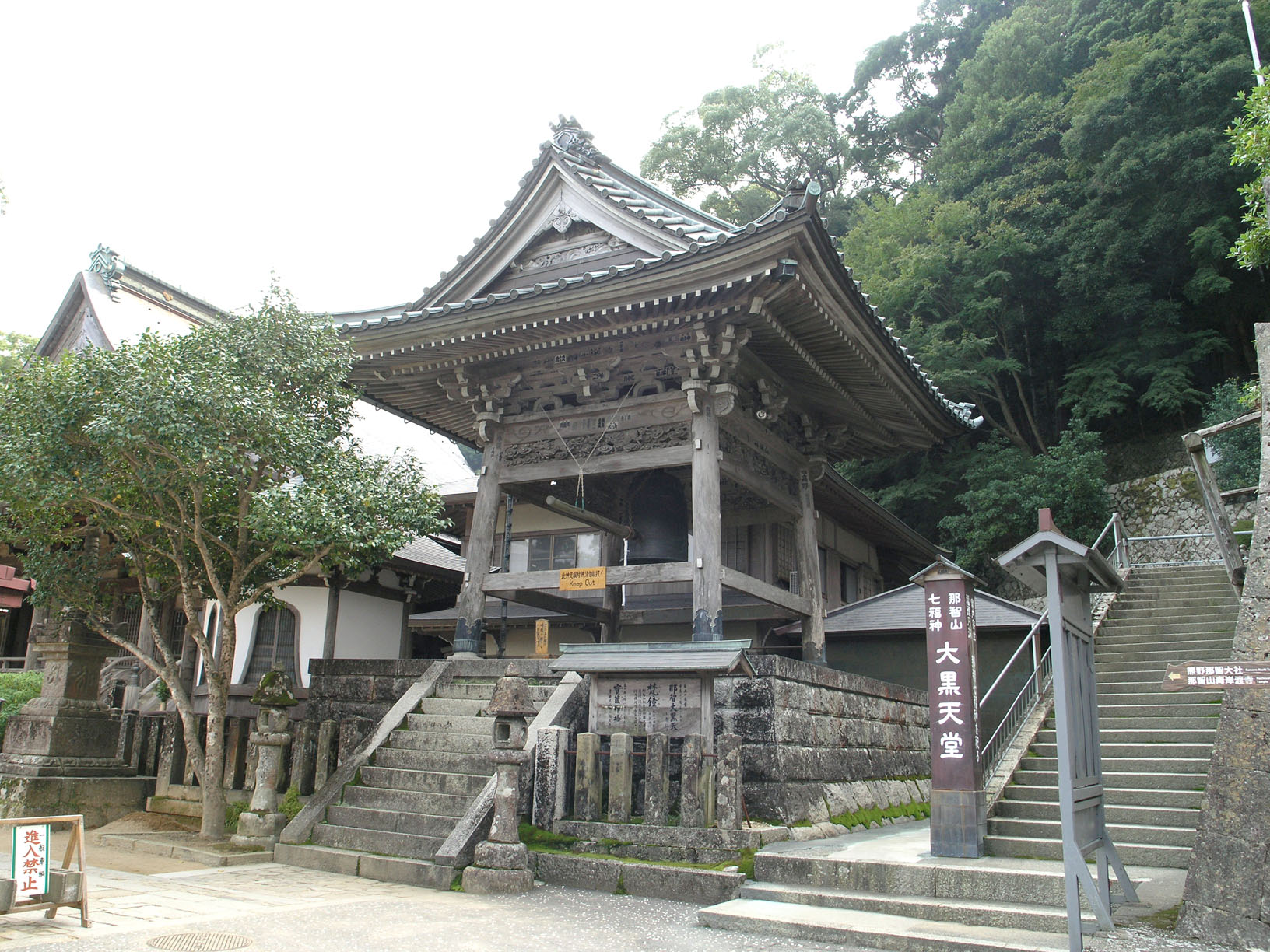
Shōrō (Belfry)

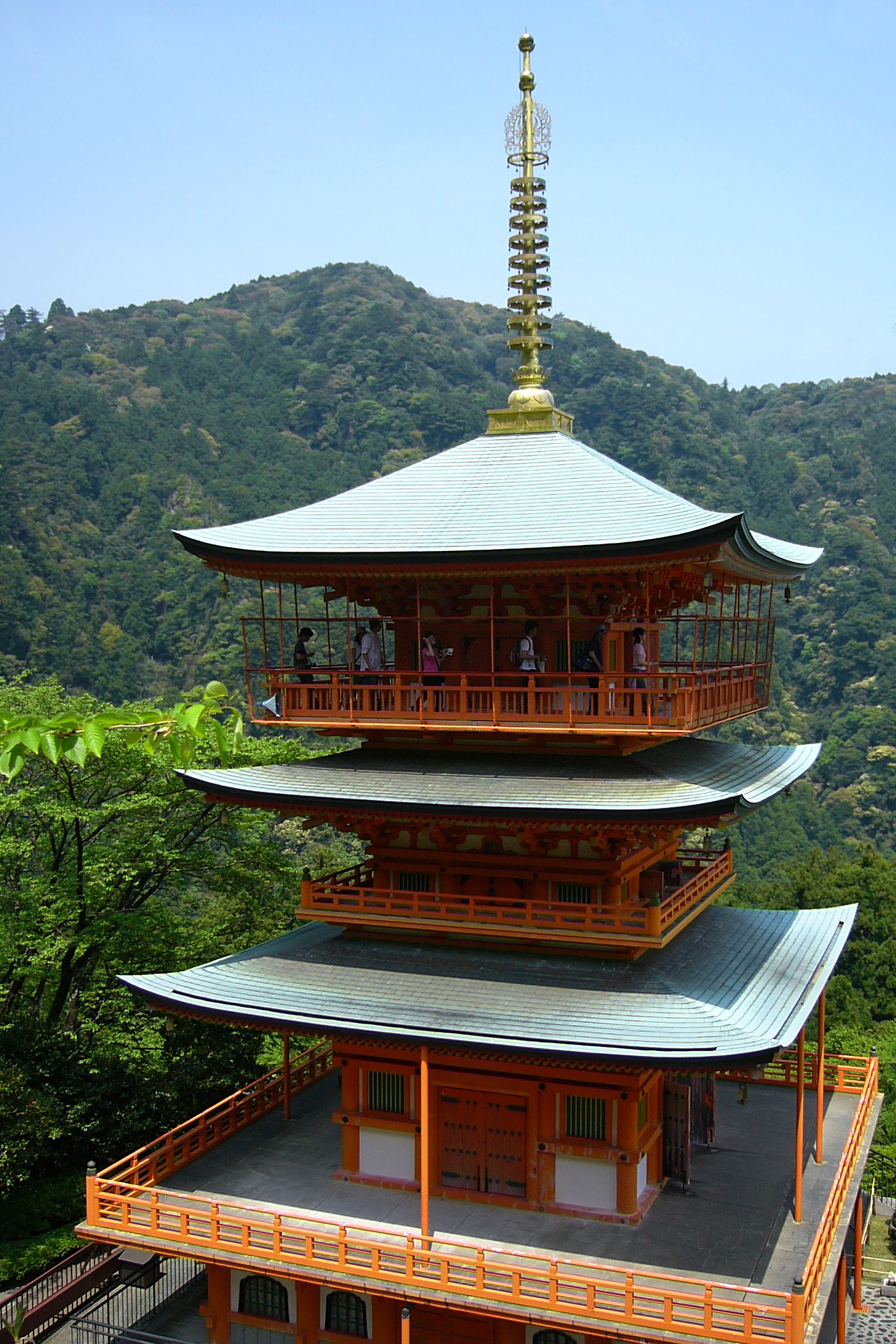
Three-storey Pagoda (Sanjūdō Pagoda)

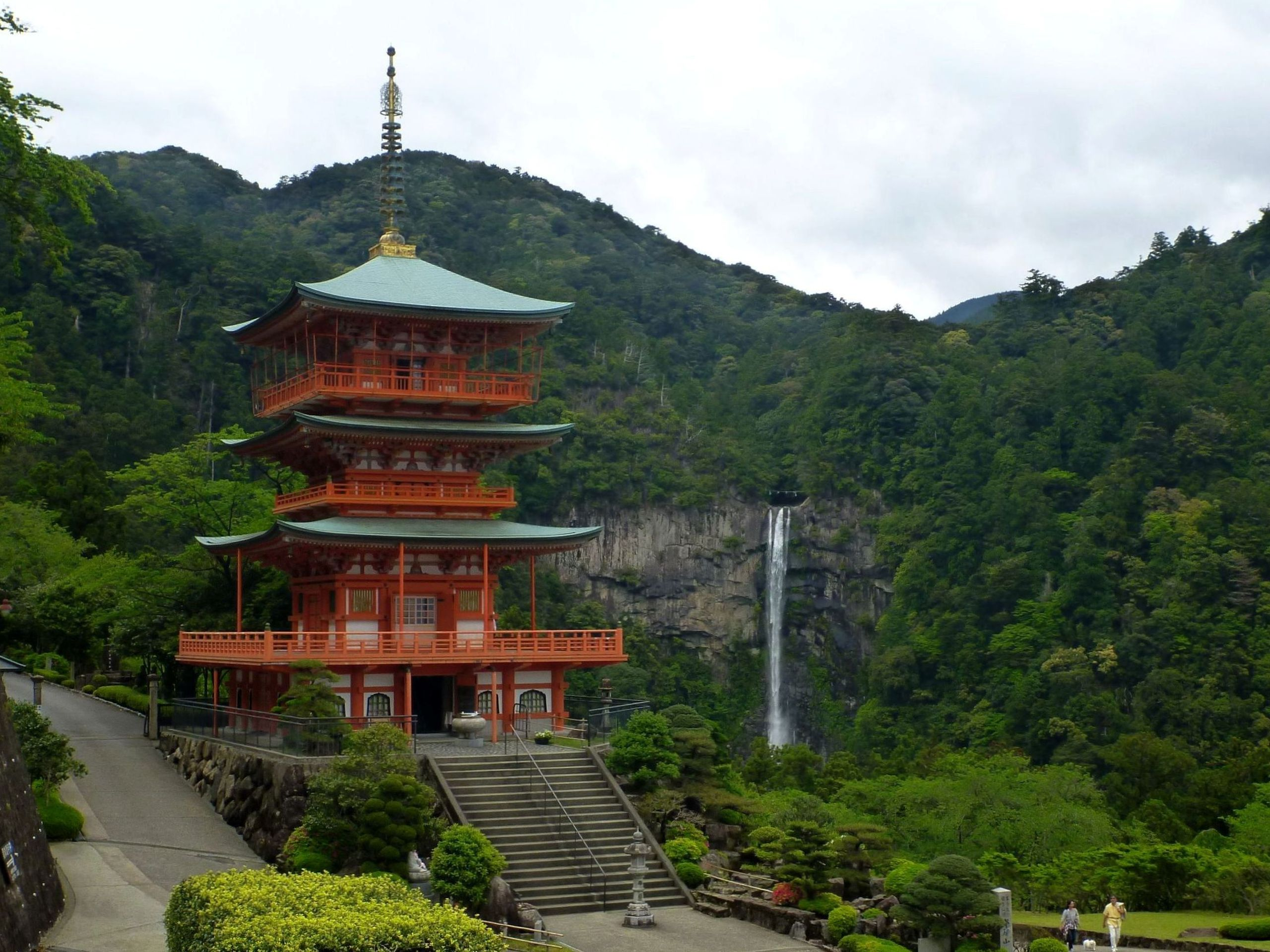
Seiganto-ji next to nachi falls

== See also ==
- Kumano Shrine
