= Fudarakusan-ji =

Buddhist temple in Wakayama Prefecture, Japan

Coordinates: 33°38′41.01″N 135°56′3.97″E

Fudarakusan-ji 補陀洛山寺
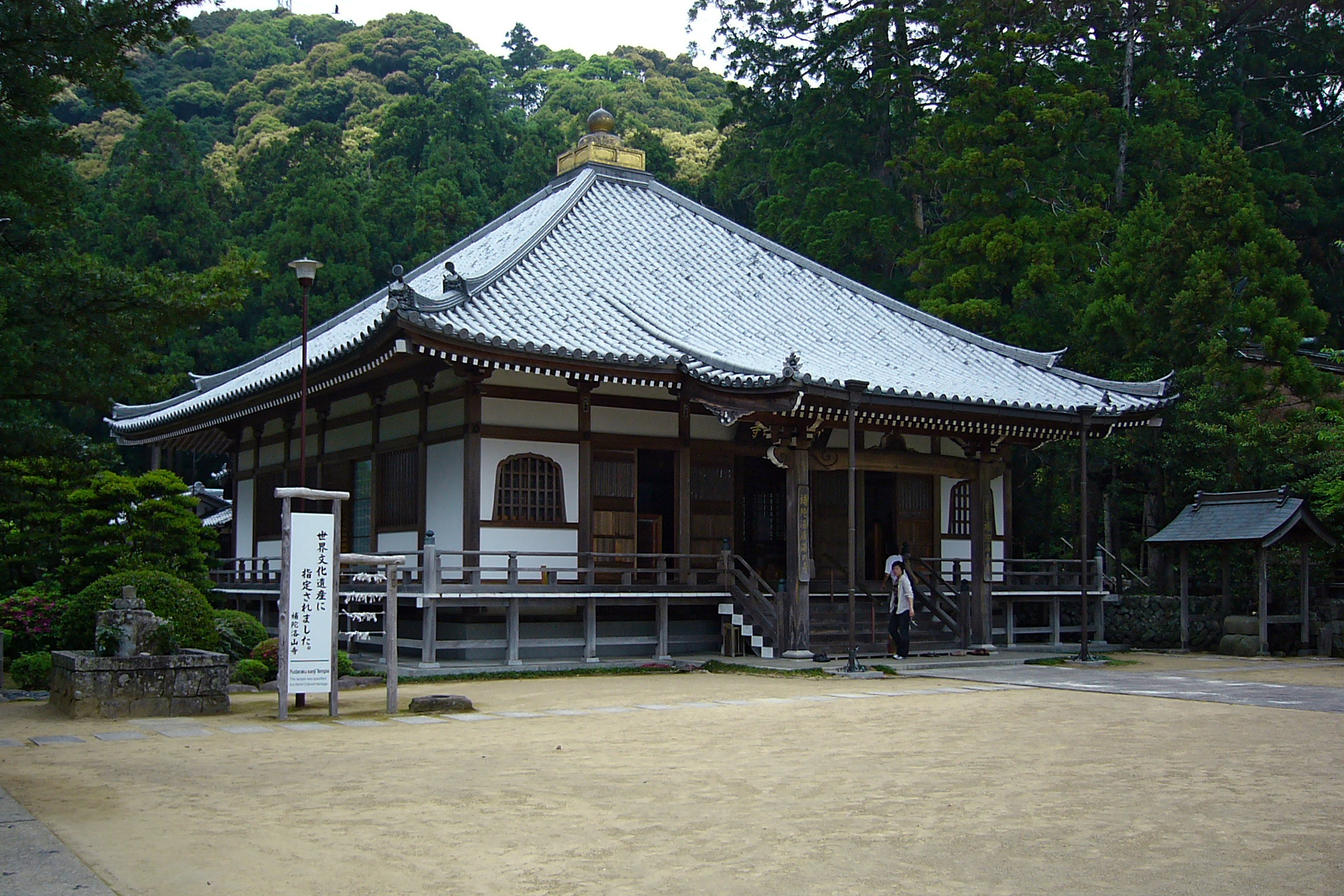

Religion
- Affiliation: Tendai
- Deity: Senju Kannon (Avalokiteśvara)

Location
- Location: 348 Hamanomiya, Nachikatsuura-chō, Higashimuro-gun, Wakayama Prefecture
- Country: Japan
- Interactive map of Fudarakusan-ji 補陀洛山寺

Architecture
- Completed: 4th century (legendary)

Fudarakusan-ji (補陀洛山寺, Fudarakusan-ji) is Tendai temple of the Higashimuro district, Wakayama prefecture, Japan. The name of temple comes from mount Potalaka. It is said to have been founded by Ragyō Shōnin, a monk from India.

In 2004, it was designated as part of a UNESCO World Heritage Site under the name Sacred Sites and Pilgrimage Routes in the Kii Mountain Range.

== See also ==
- Sacred Sites and Pilgrimage Routes in the Kii Mountain Range
- Seiganto-ji
