= Kumano Hongū Taisha =

Shinto shrine in Wakayama Prefecture, Japan

- 熊野本宮大社
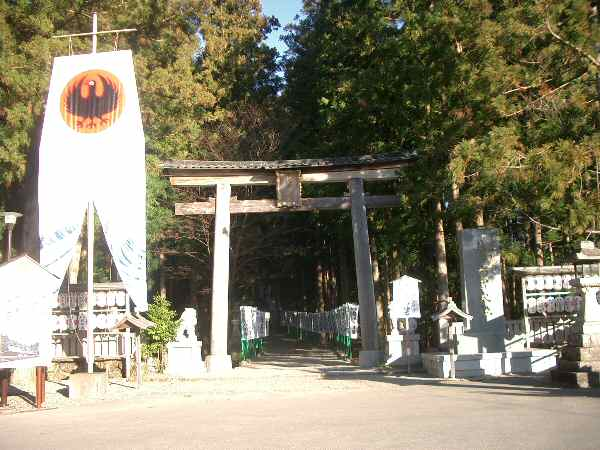
- Torii of Kumano Hongu Taisha with a flag representing Yatagarasu

- Location within Japan Location within Wakayama Prefecture

Religion
- Affiliation: Shinto
- Deity: Kumano Gongen (熊野権現)

Location
- Location: 1110 Hongucho Hongu, Tanabe, Wakayama Prefecture 647-1731, Japan
- Coordinates: 33°50′24″N 135°46′26″E

Kumano Hongū Taisha (熊野本宮大社) is a Shinto shrine in Tanabe in Wakayama, Japan. It is included as part of the Kumano Sanzan in the World Heritage Site "Sacred Sites and Pilgrimage Routes in the Kii Mountain Range". The main deities enshrined are Kumano Sansho Gongen (熊野三所権現): Ketsumimiko (家津美御子), Hayatama (速玉) and Fusubi (牟須美). All of the ancient Kumano Kodō routes lead to the Grand Shrine.

It was originally located at present Ōyunohara (大斎原), on a sandbank at the confluence of the Kumano River and Otonashi River. In 1889, it was partially destroyed in a flood and the remaining shrine buildings were relocated at its present site in 1891. Of the original five main pavilions only three were rebuilt. Four deities were moved there and the other eight are still enshrined there in two stone monuments.

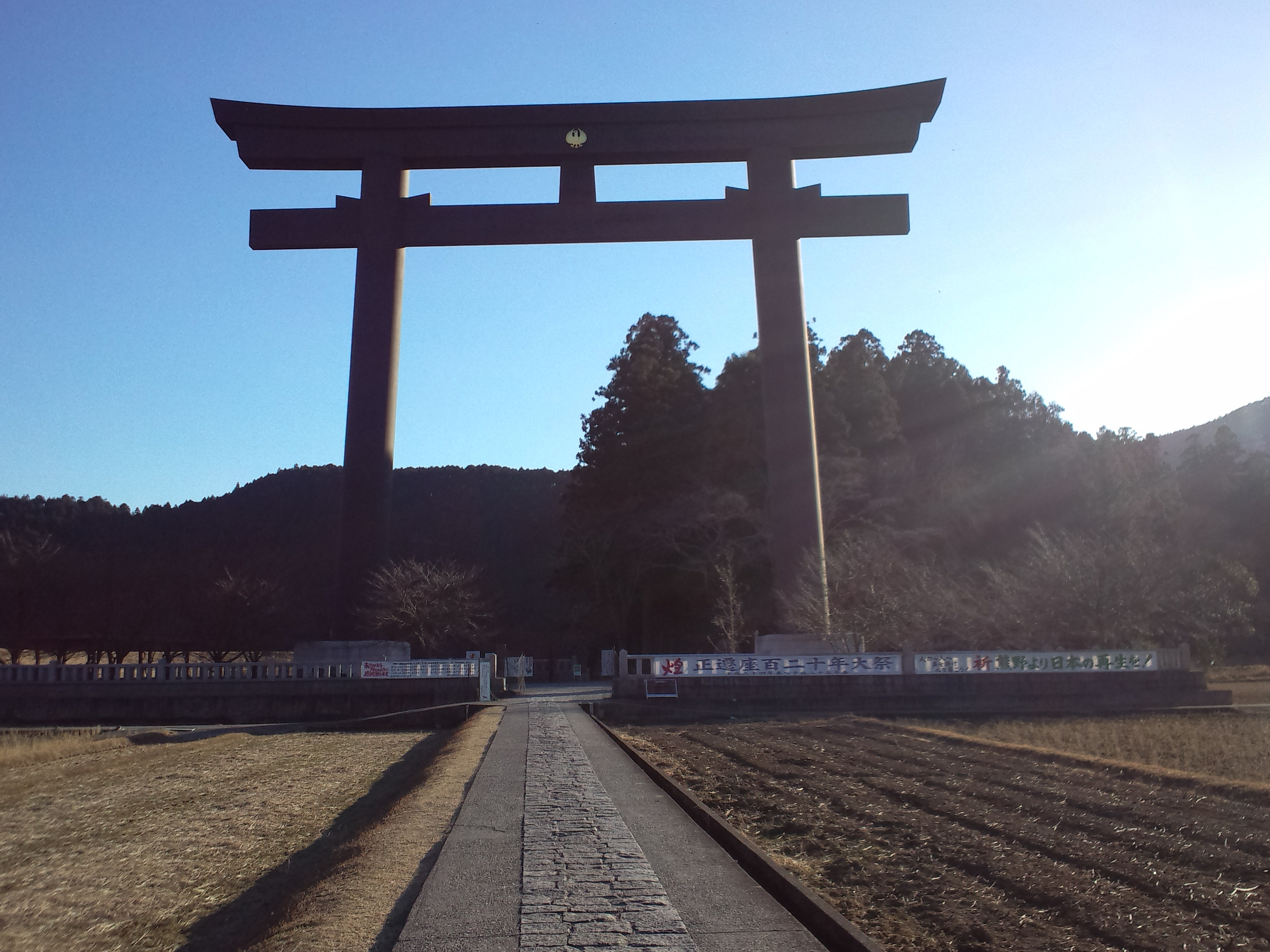
Otorii

In 2000, the largest torii shrine gate in the world (33.9 m (111 ft) tall and 42 m (138 ft) wide) was erected at the entrance to the Oyunohara sandbank. It is an official gateway that designates the entrance to a sacred area. It signifies the division of the secular and the spiritual worlds. This torii is called Otorii (o means "great") and is made of steel weighing 172 tons, which took about six months to make and another six months to assemble.

== History ==
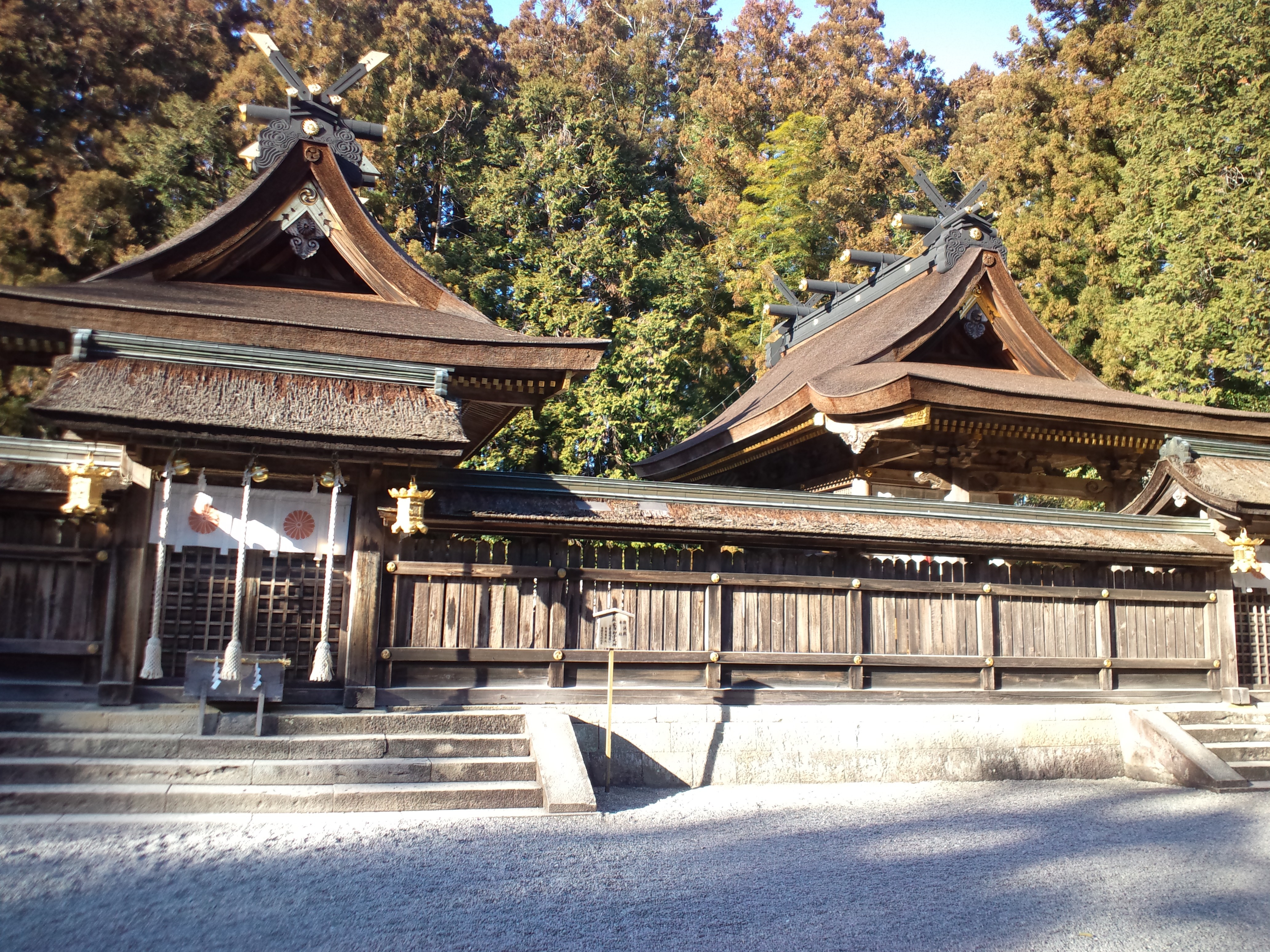
Hongu Taisha main temple

Over 900 years ago a pilgrim wrote of a massive shrine grounds including five main pavilions enshrining 12 deities. Numerous other small temples and shrines could be found surrounding the main buildings. Over the centuries the pavilions were partially destroyed by periodic fires and flooding, but always faithfully rebuilt to their original state. The last fire was in 1776 and the buildings rebuilt again in 1803. The first drawing of the shrine grounds from over 800 years ago and the reconstruction that took place in 1803 are almost exactly identical. After the flood of 1889, the shrine pavilions were moved and rebuilt at their present location.

== Architecture ==
The Kumano Hongu Taisha's pavilions are an outstanding example of Japanese shrine architecture. The use of natural unfinished materials allows it to blend effortlessly into the natural environment. Intricate joint works were used in the construction instead of nails. The thick roof gracefully sweeps forward extending over the stairs and the area in front of the shrine. It is made entirely of hinoki, Japanese cypress bark.

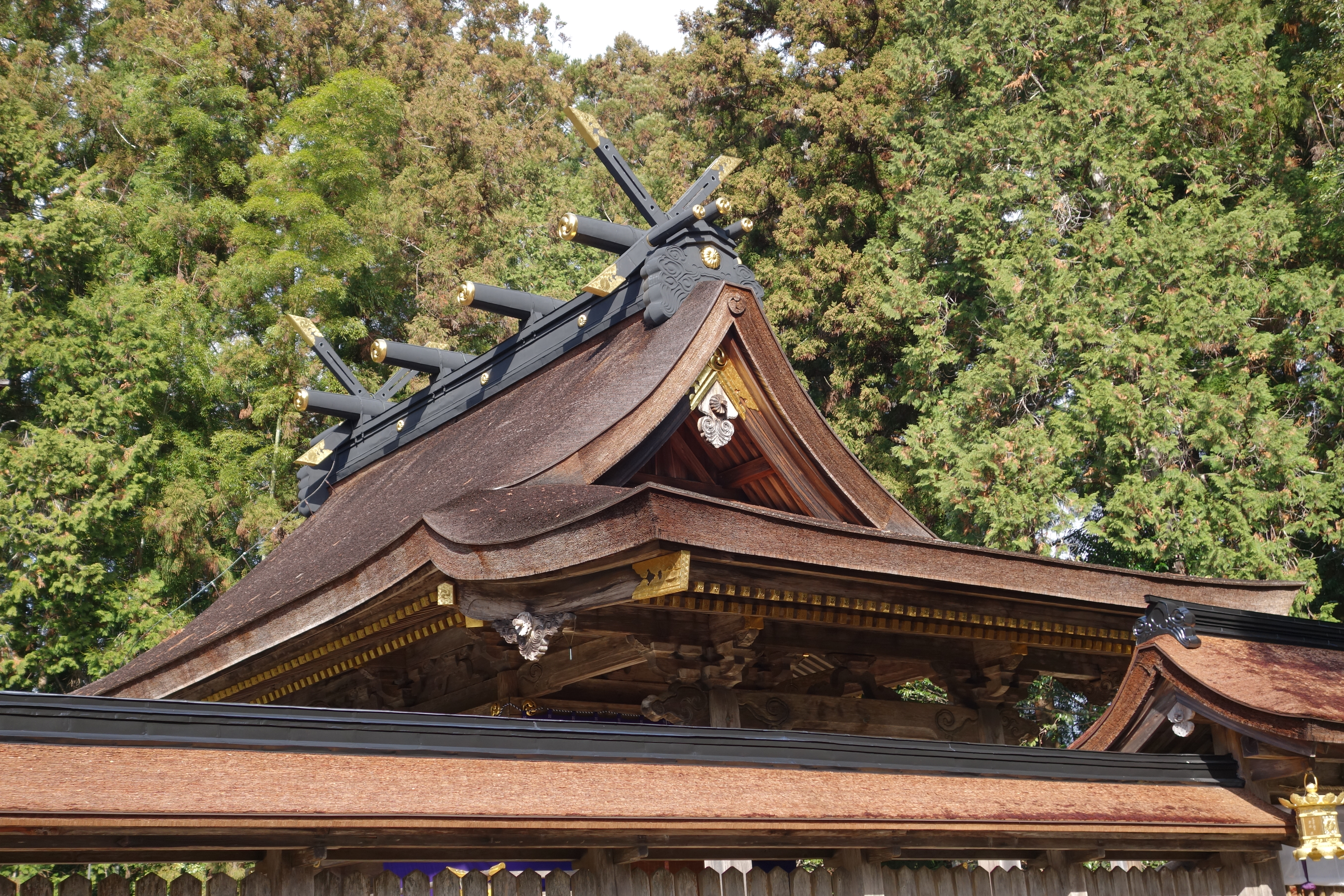
Hongu Taisha rooftop

The bronze ornaments on the roof top are characteristic features of shrine architecture. The X-shaped crosspieces that pierce the sky are called Chigi and the log like beams that are laid horizontally along and perpendicular to the ridge line are called Katsuogi. They add a dramatic highlight to the roof line.

Unique to the Kumano Hongu Taisha is the space or corridor under the verandas of the pavilions. In the past, the pilgrims and ascetics would use this tiny refuge for meditation, prayer, sutra copying, austere rites and even sleeping quarters. In fact, this is where Saint Ippen Shonin was enlightened. The Kumano Hongu Taisha is a mixture between Kasuga and Taisha styles but because of this sacred corridor it has also been referred to as the Kumano style.

== Festivals ==
Kumano Hongu Taisha Spring Festival, the annual spring festival held 13–15 April every year, is not only a quintessential festival of Kumano but also intimately associated with the pilgrimage to Kumano and the Kumano Kodo pilgrimage route. On April 13 fathers and their young sons purify themselves in the sacred waters of Yunomine Onsen before walking over the Dainichi-goe section of the Kumano Kodo pilgrimage route to Oyunohara wearing traditional costumes. The young boys have the character for big on their forehead and are forbidden to touch the ground. On April 15 the Kumano Deities are invoked to temporarily take up residence in a portable mikoshi shrine and return to their original site of descend, Oyunohara. The atmosphere is serene, traditional, authentic and inspiring.

Yata-no-Hi Matsuri Fire Festival takes place on the last Saturday of August, in Oyunohara (Hongu-cho), in honour of Yatagarasu. This fire festival includes the parading of a fire mikoshi, a Taiko drum show, dancing, and fireworks.

== Access ==
- Buses from:
  - West Japan Railway Company, Central Japan Railway Company Shingū Station on Kisei Main Line
  - JR-West Kii-Tanabe Station blues
  - Nanki–Shirahama Airport
