= Chikatsuyu =

Village in Wakayama, Japan

Chikatsuyu 近津湯
- Village
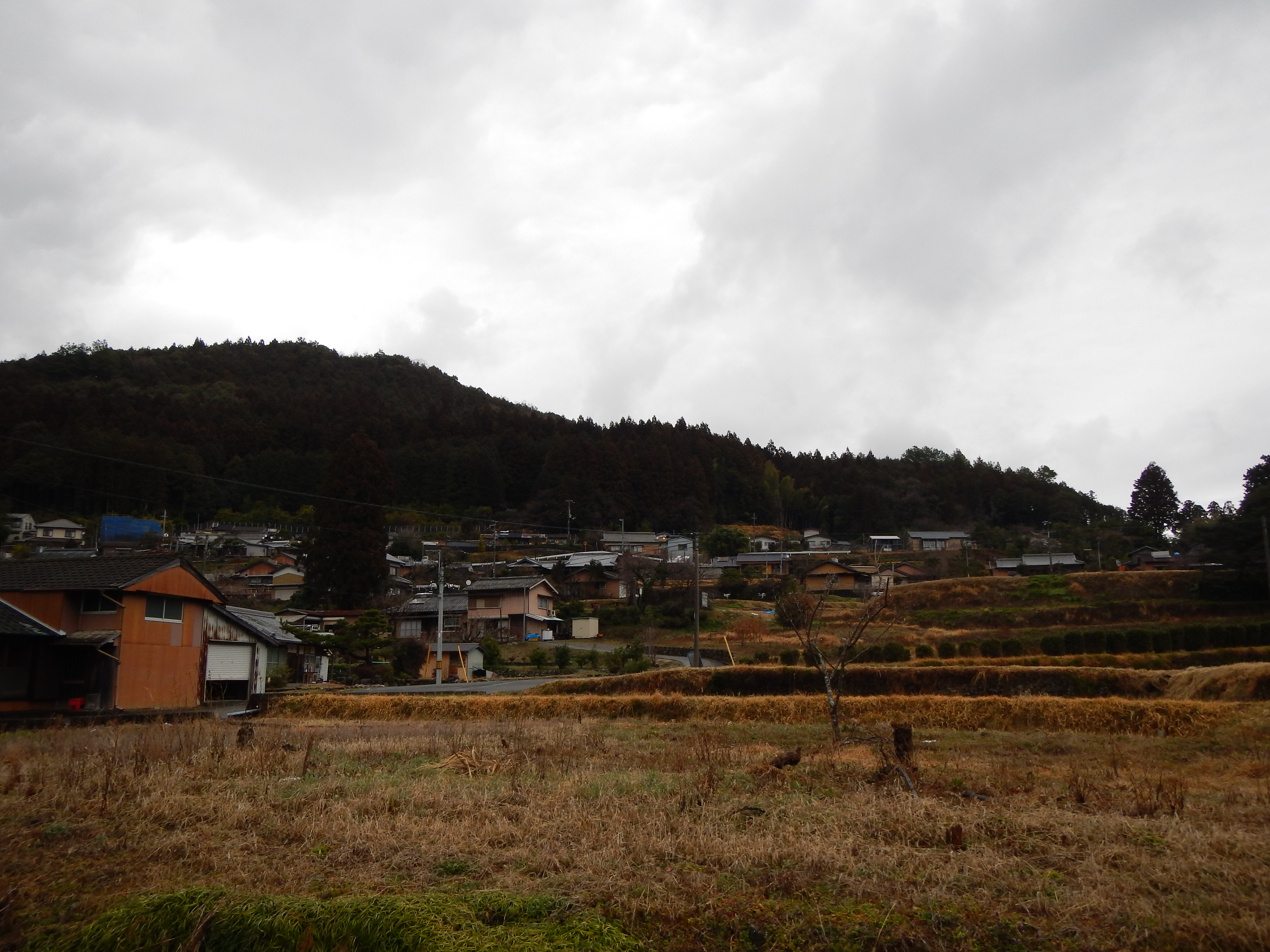

- Location in Japan
- Coordinates: 33°48′52.53″N 135°36′32.55″E
- Country: Japan
- Region: Kansai
- Prefecture: Wakayama
- District: Tanabe

Population
  - Total: 450
- Time zone: UTC+09:00 (JST)
- Postal code: 646-1402
- Website: Official website

Chikatsuyu is a small village (pop. 450) in Wakayama Prefecture, Japan. It is part of the Tanabe City municipality. It sits adjacent to the Hidaka-gawa River. It is one of the ancient post stations (postal towns) along the Kumano Kodo World Heritage route.

== History ==
During the peak years of the Kumano Kodo pilgrimage, Chikatsuyu was much more populous than it is today. It is situated on the Nakahechi route of the Kumano Kodo that heads from the coast at Tanabe to Kumano Hongū Taisha. There are various theories about the origin of the place name, it was previously written as “Chikayu” and “Chikatsuyu” in the Heian period. A common tale says that the area was named by a boy emperor, who snapped a reed while travelling nearby and asked if the liquid dripping from it was 'blood or dew' ('chi ka tsuyu').

== Attractions ==
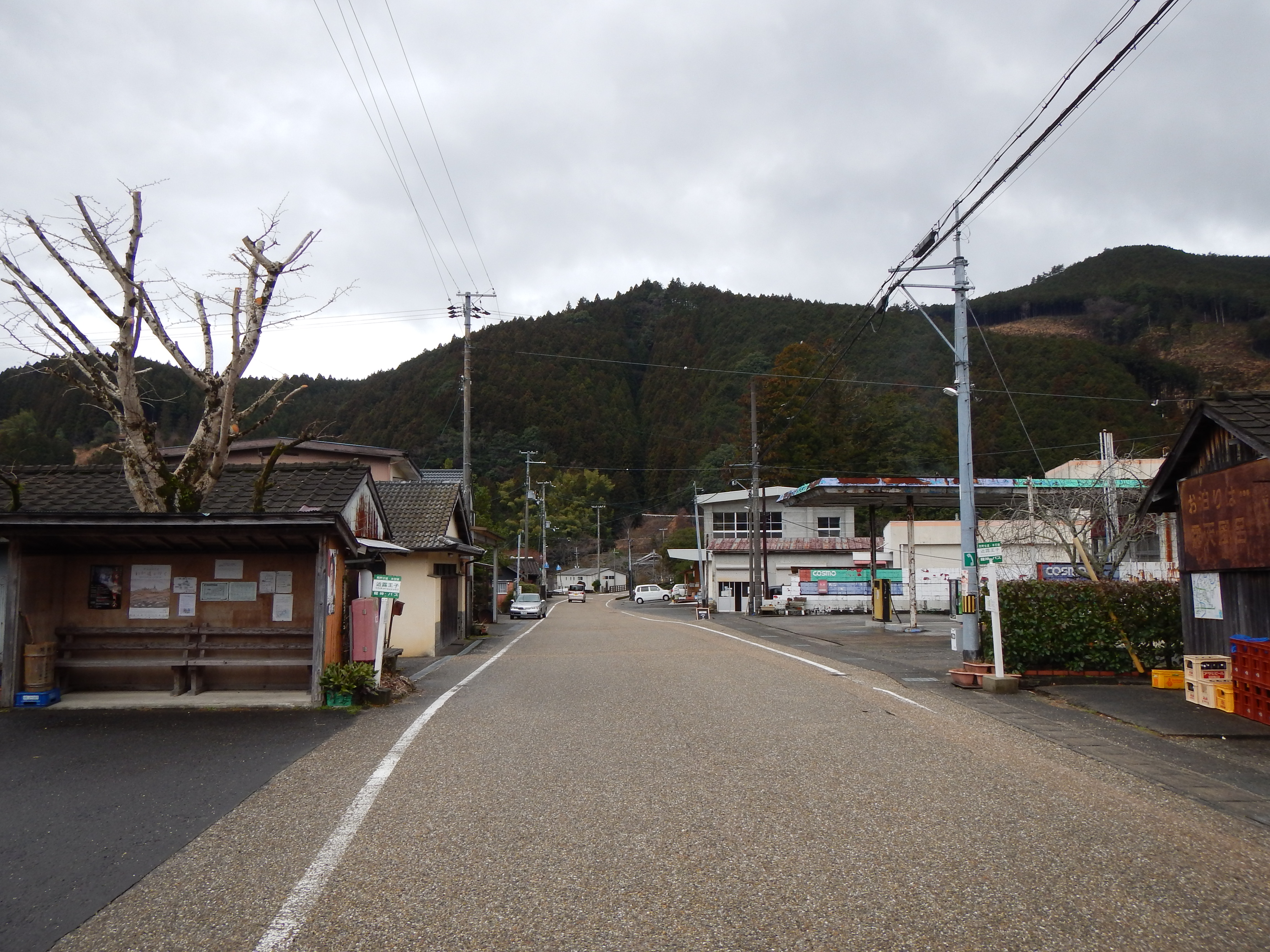
View of Chikatsuyu main street

Kumano Kodo Nakahechi Art Museum (Nakahechi Bijutsukan) is a large, well-funded art museum.

There is a graveyard for the historic Nonagese and Yokoya clans.

There are multiple shrines throughout the towns area, including the important Chikatsuyu-oji.

There is one site in town listed as a National Historic Site - the Chikatsuyu Hōtō (近露の宝塔). There is also the remnant site of an old castle.

== Facilities ==
Chikatsuyu has two campgrounds.

There is a well-stocked roadside station (michi no eki) nearby, the A-Coop grocery store along Highway No. 311.

There are multiple inns in town that go back to the Edo period, including Nonaka (Tsugizakura-oji).

There are also a couple restaurants and stores in town, as well as a local tourist agency. There is also a Basque food restaurant on the path east of town.

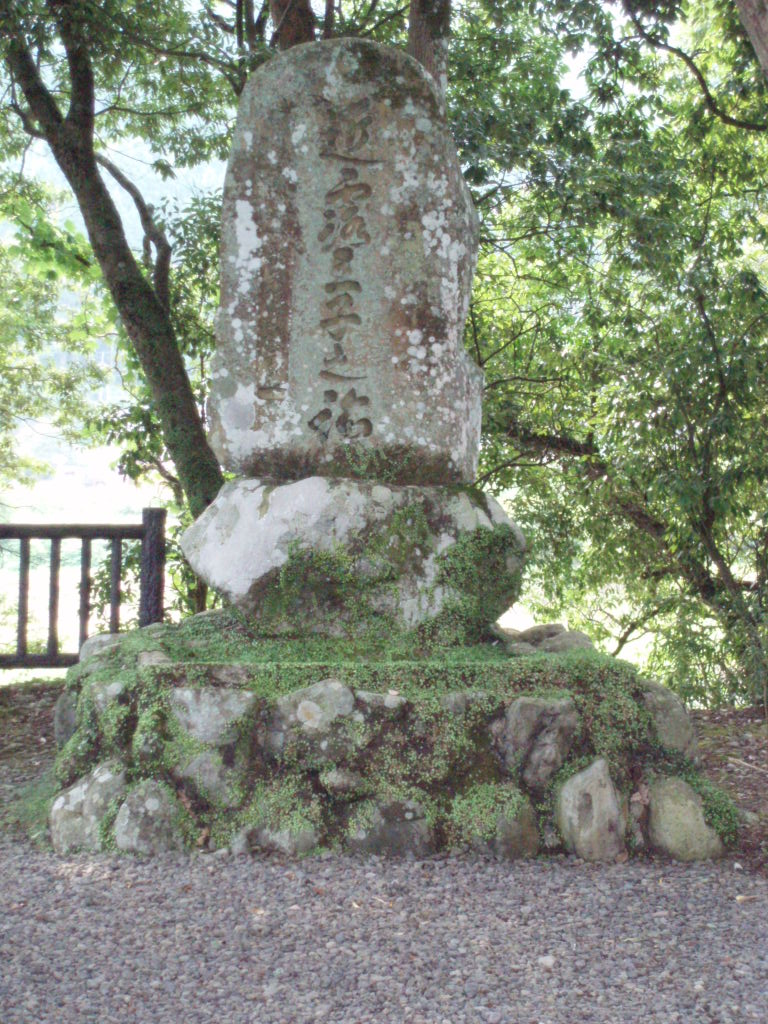
Chikatsuyu-oji

There are a couple onsens in town.

Local schools include the Chikano Nursery, the Musuhi Budojo martial arts school, and the Tanabe Chikatsuyu Municipal Elementary School and Junior Highschool. There are plans for a new school to be built in 2025.

== Access ==
Chikatsuyu is located 50 minutes by bus from Kii-Tanabe Station. There are also buses that travel daily between Tanabe and Hongu. Nakahechi Bijutsukan (Art Museum) and Chikatsuyu-oji are the two main bus stops.
