= Yunomine Onsen =

Thermal spring system and resort town

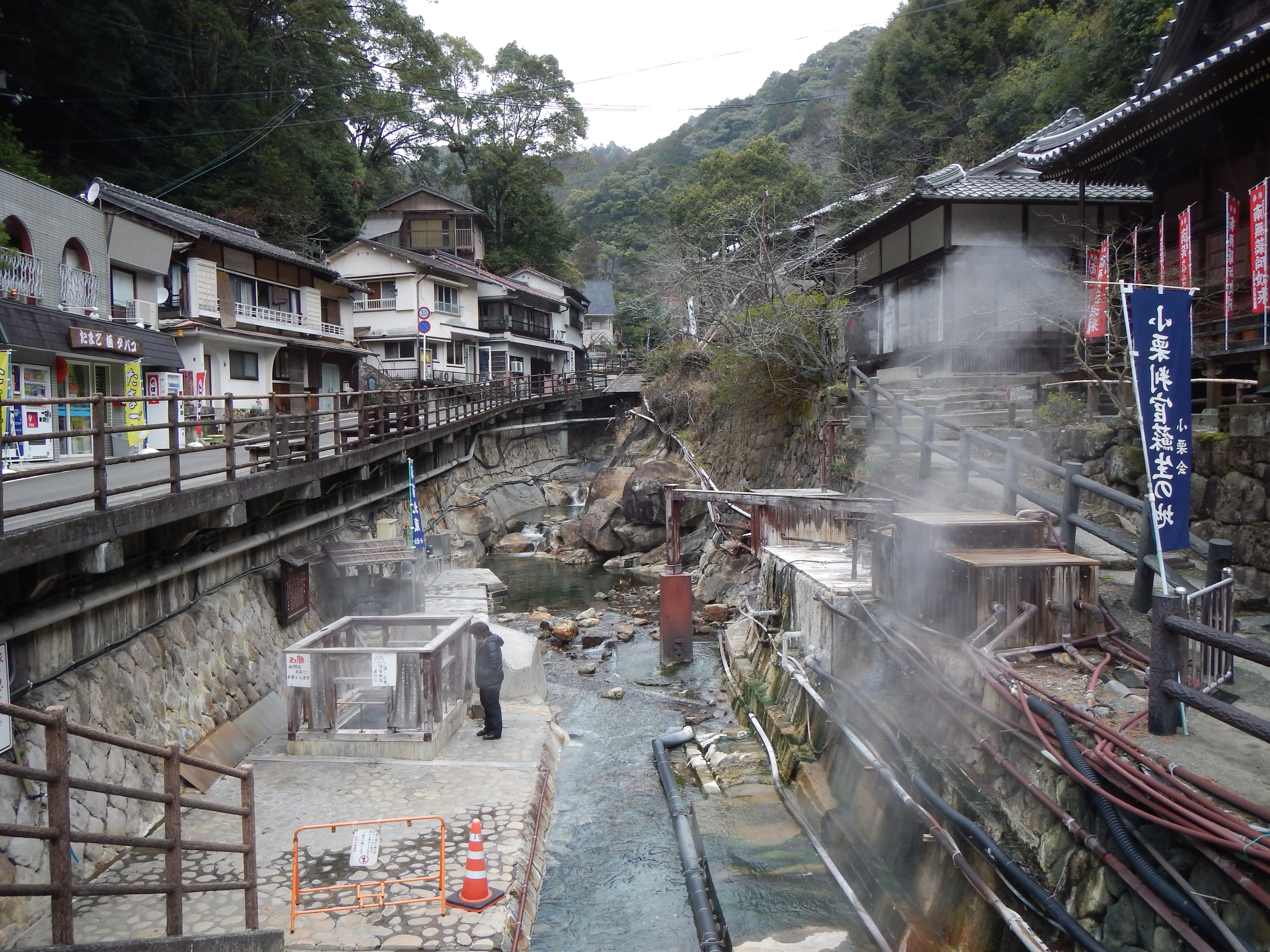
- Kumano Kodo pilgrimage route through the Yunomine Onsen World Heritage site

- Location within Japan
- Interactive map of Yunomine Onsen
- Location: Tanabe, Wakayama Prefecture, Japan
- Coordinates: 33°49′44.03″N 135°45′27.27″E
- Type: geothermal
- Temperature: 90 °C (194 °F)

Yunomine Onsen is a hot spring system and resort town in Tanabe, near Hongu Town in southern Wakayama Prefecture, Japan. The Tsuboyu bath is located there, a UNESCO World Heritage site.

== Description ==
Yunomine Onsen is considered one of the oldest thermal spring systems in Japan, and was discovered 1,800 years ago. For over 1000 years, people have made pilgrimage to the onsen to participate in hot spring water purification rituals to prepare for visiting Kumano Hongu Taisha shrine to worship. The UNESCO inscribed Kumano Kodo Pilgrimage Route passes through the onsen town. It's located in a narrow, deep valley in the Kumano mountain range, along the Nakahechi Trail of the Kumano Kodo.

A hot creek flows through Yunomine Onsen. The World Heritage site of Tsuboyu Bath; a small, wooden cabin houses a stone-lined hot spring. The soaking pool only fits one or two people. Legends exist claiming that the waters of Tsuboyu have "miraculous healing" properties. Several kabuki plays refer to the Tsuboyu bath including the tale of “Oguri Hangan and Princess Terute”, in which the former is healed from a debilitating illness. Folklore asserts the hot spring water changes in color seven times throughout each day. Legends claim that the thermal spring water was found flowing out of a stone statue of Yakushi Nyorai, the Buddha of healing and medicine. The statue is now located at the Toko-ji Buddhist temple.

The Yunomine Public Bathhouse is located next to the Toko-ji temple. A stone sculpture memorializing the monk and high priest Genpo is located on the bathhouse grounds.

One of the public hot springs called Yuzutsu is used as a public community cooking basin for preparing onsen tamago (hot spring eggs), and vegetables. Some of the traditional ryokans use the hot spring water to cook rice porridge. People living in the area have used the hot springs to cook since at least the time of the Edo Period (1603 to 1868). Today tourists can buy eggs and vegetables in a net to cook in the 90°C water. Locals claim that vegetables cooked in the spring water lose any inherent bitter flavor, they also claim the spring water tenderizes meat as it cooks. Today, the geothermally heated spring water is piped into residents individual homes.

Yunomine Onsen/Tsuboyu Bath is the only hot spring that is featured as part of the UNESCO World Heritage pilgrim route, Kumano Kodo. Historically pilgrims would soak in an area where the sulfur-rich hot spring water flows into the cool waters of the Yunotani River before praying at the Kumano Hongu Taisha Shinto shrine. The Tsuboyu soaking pool that is now built on this spot.

== Water profile ==
The hot springs are high in sulfur, sodium and hydrogen carbonate. They emerge from the source at 90 °C / 194 °F. Potassium, calcium, ferrous iron, chorine and sulphate are also found in the mineral water.

== Gallery ==
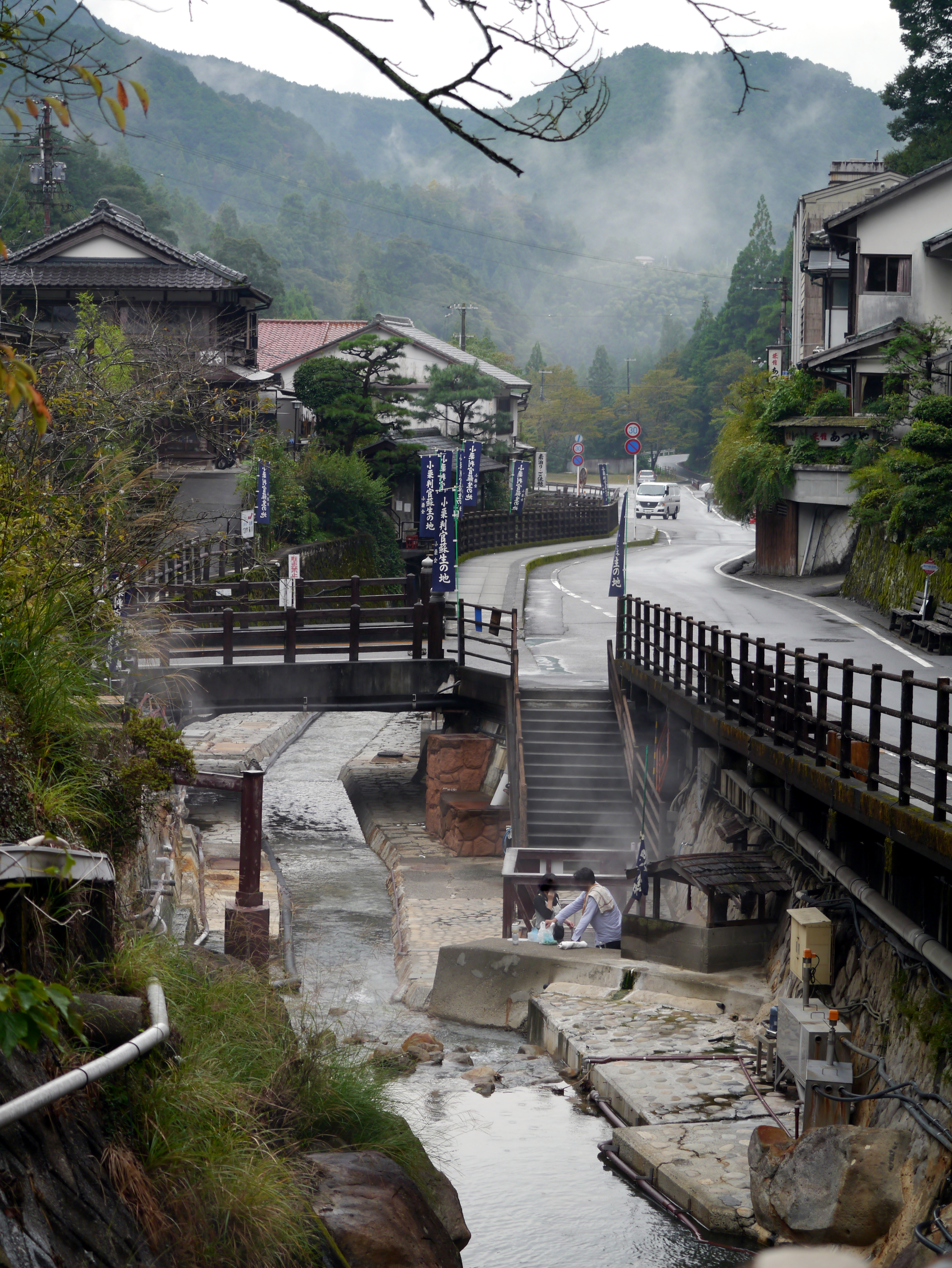
Yunomine Onsen

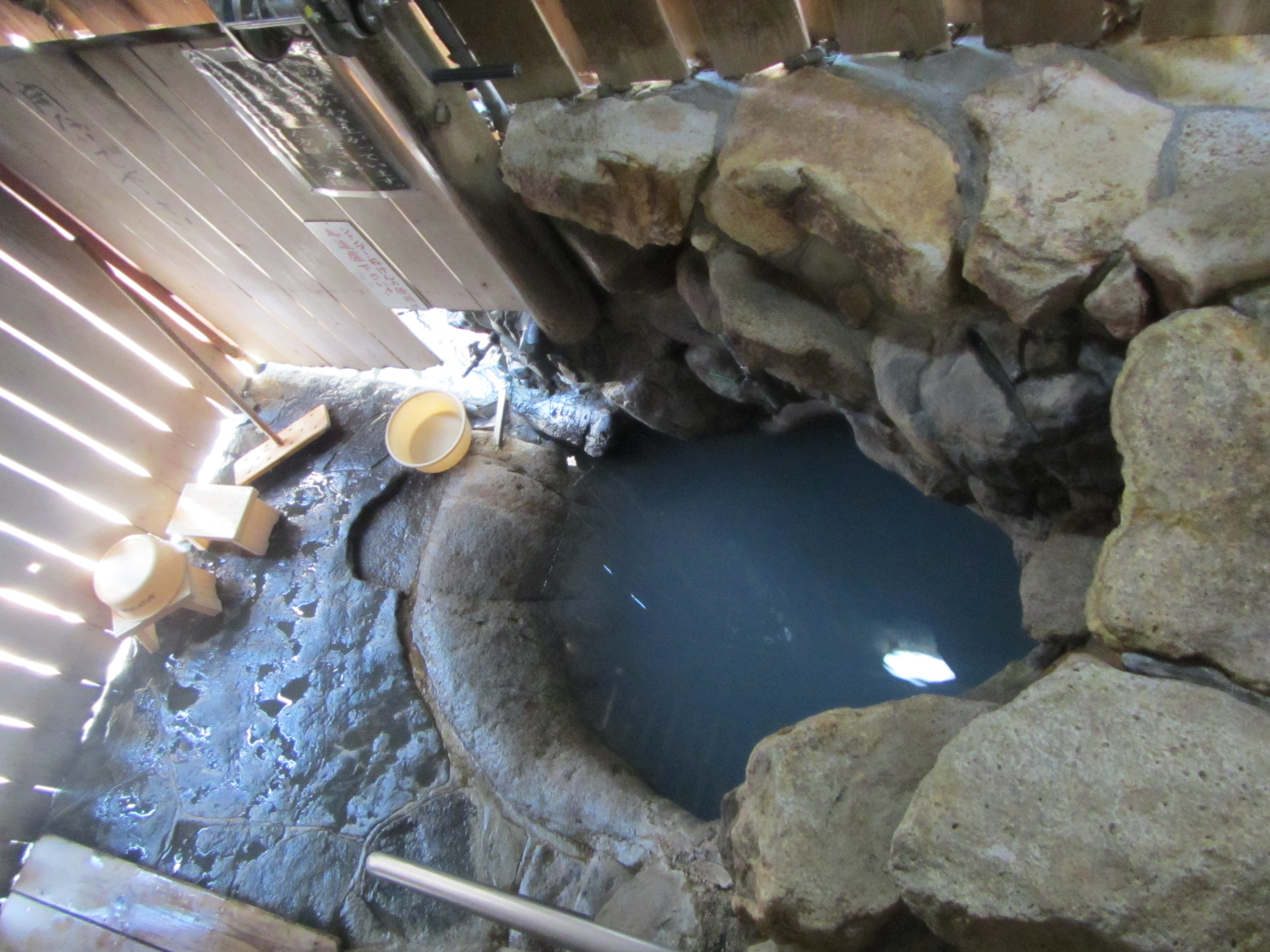
Tsuboyu Bath at Yunomine Onsen

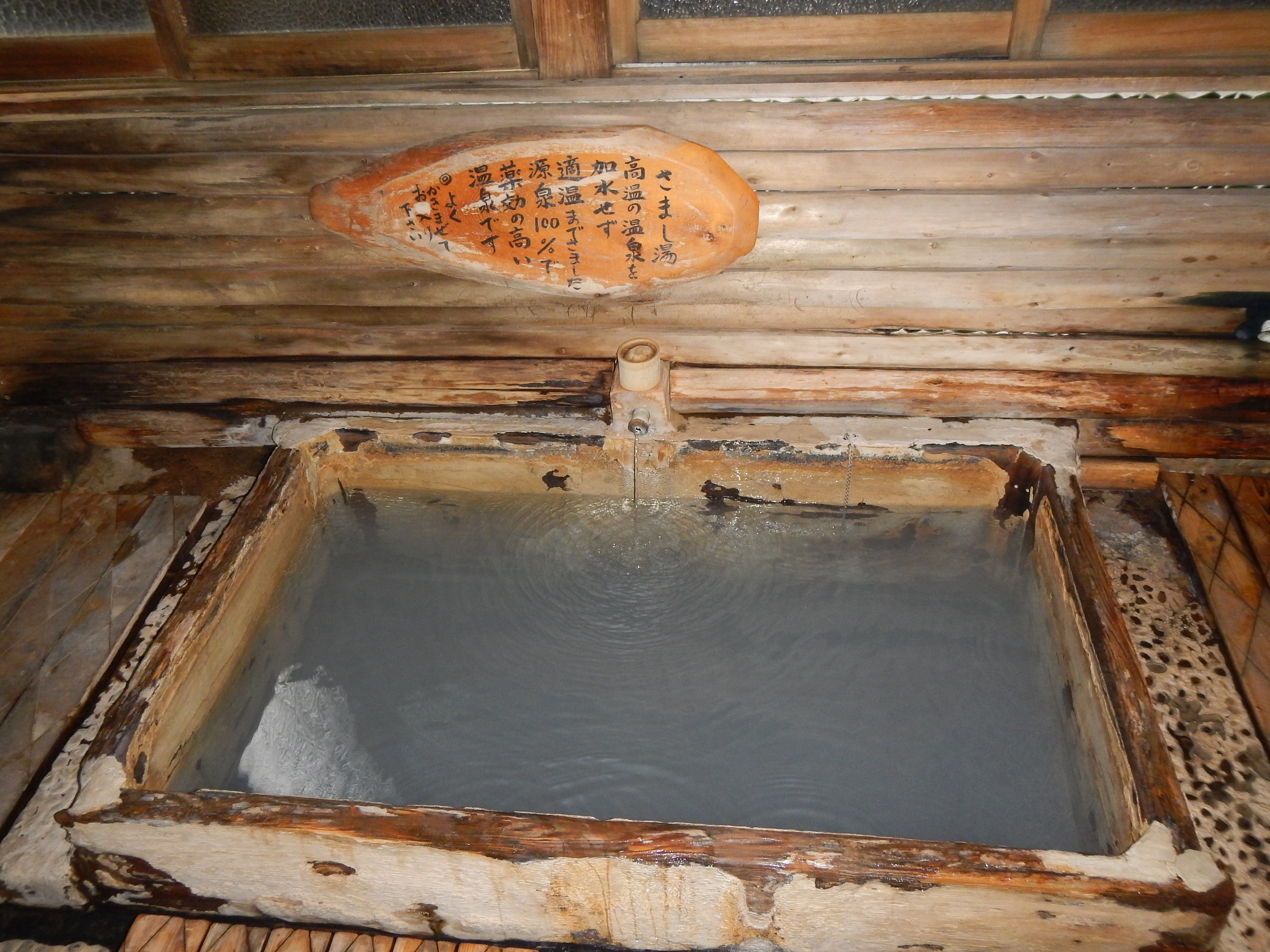
One of many soaking pools

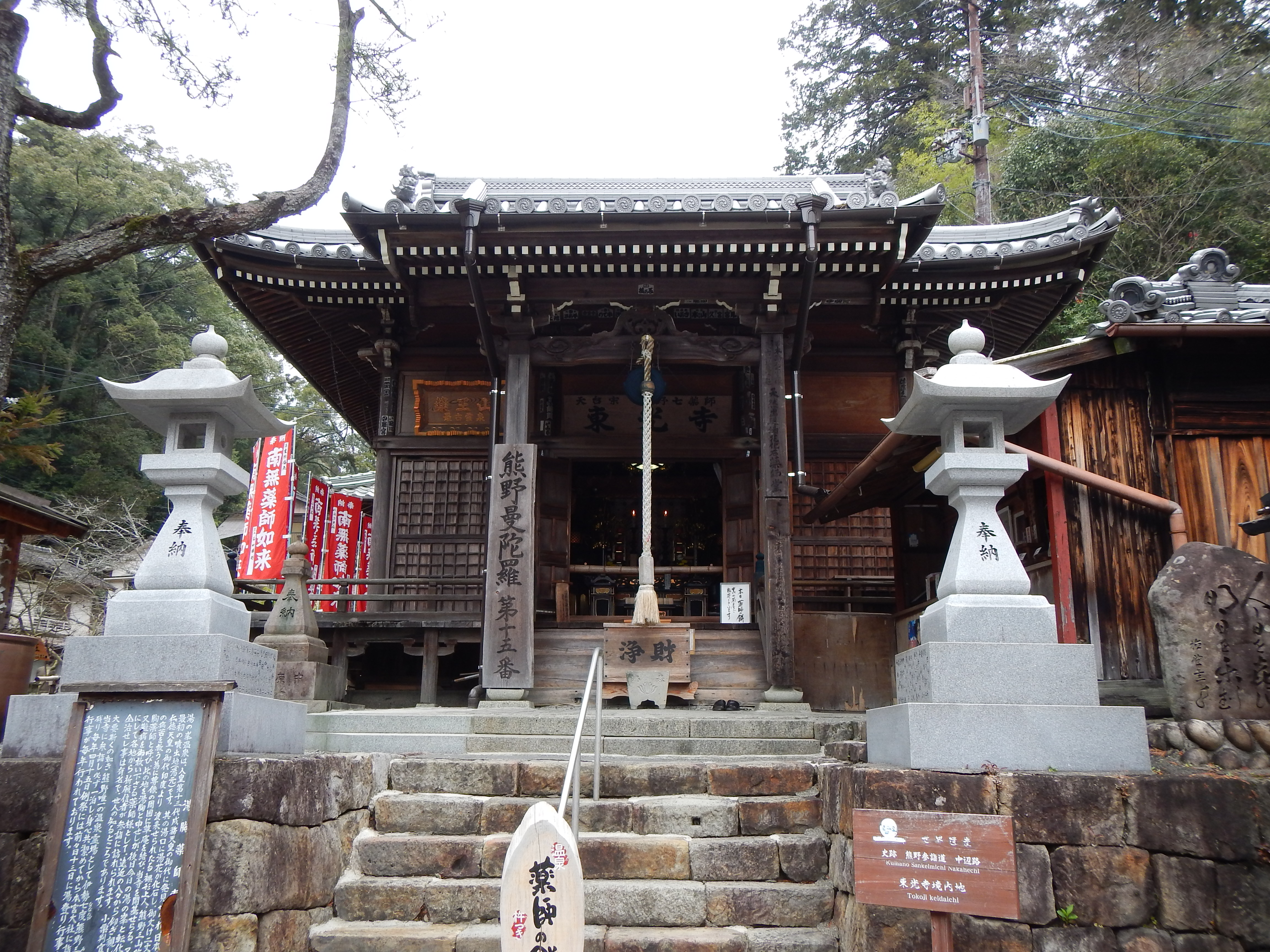
Kumano Kodo pilgrimage route Yunomine Onsen world heritage site

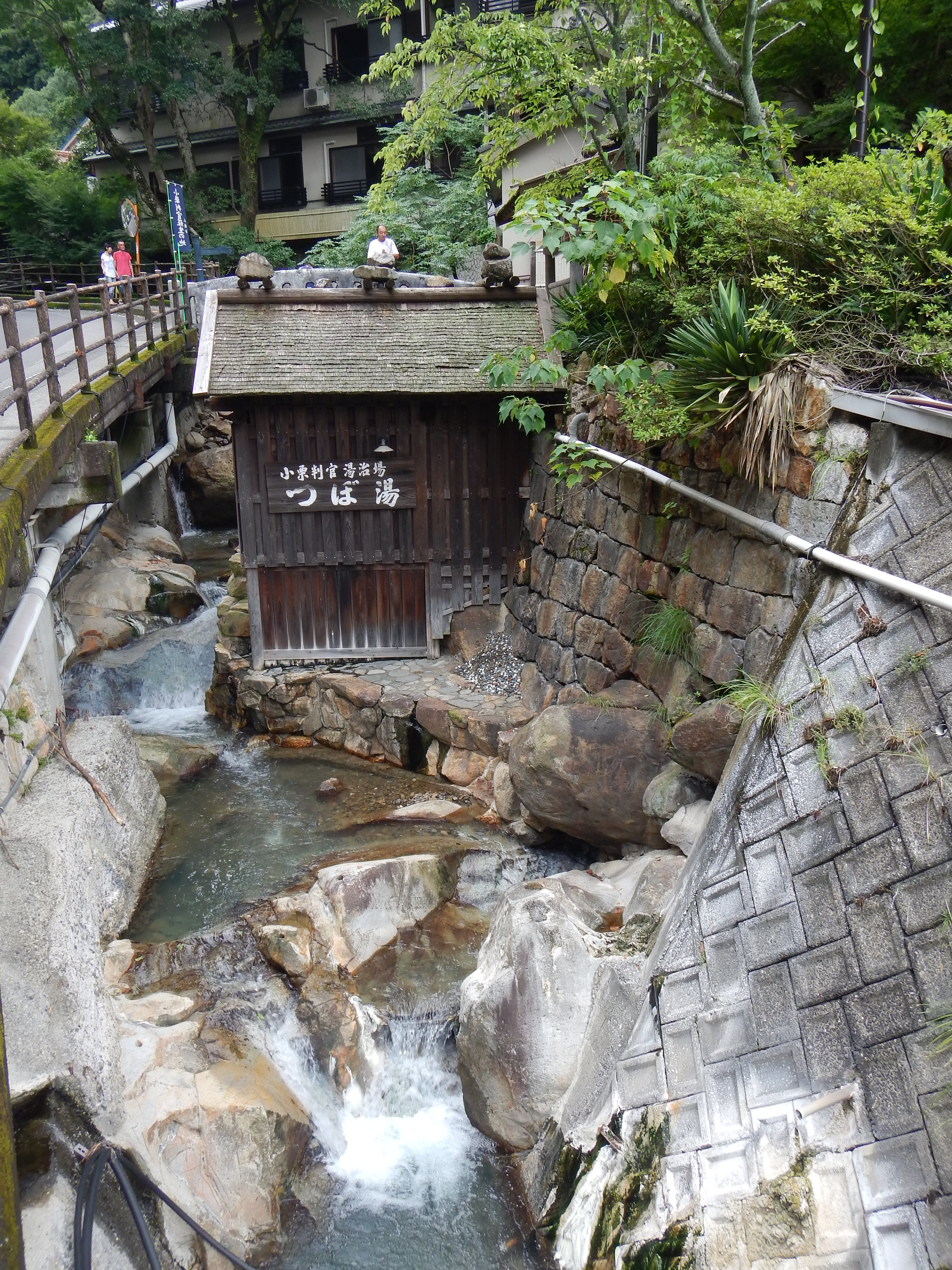
Tsuboyu bath

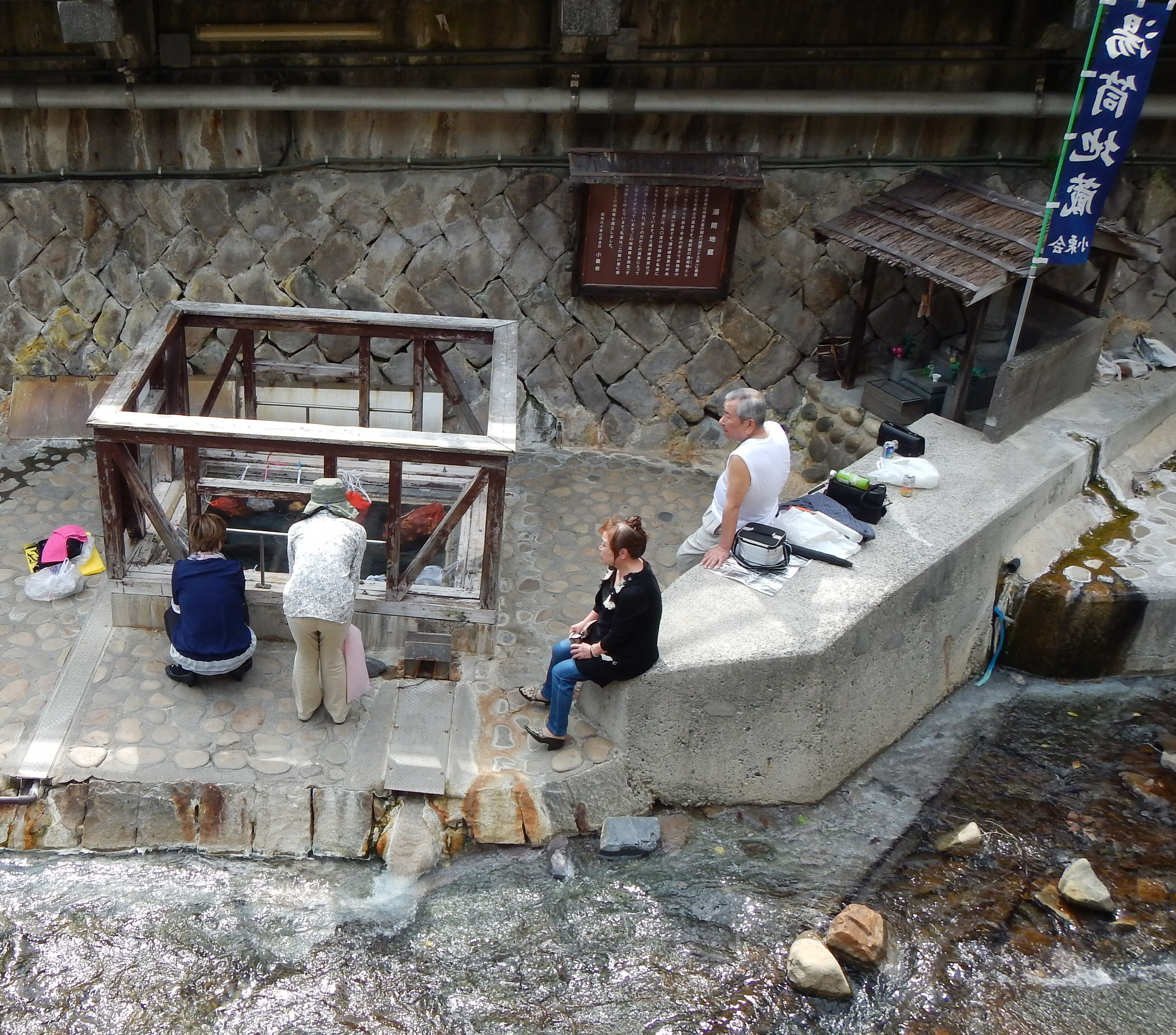
Yuzutsu hot spring used for cooking Onsen Tamago
