= Kumano Kodō =

Series of ancient pilgrimage routes in Japan

Kumano Kodō (熊野古道)
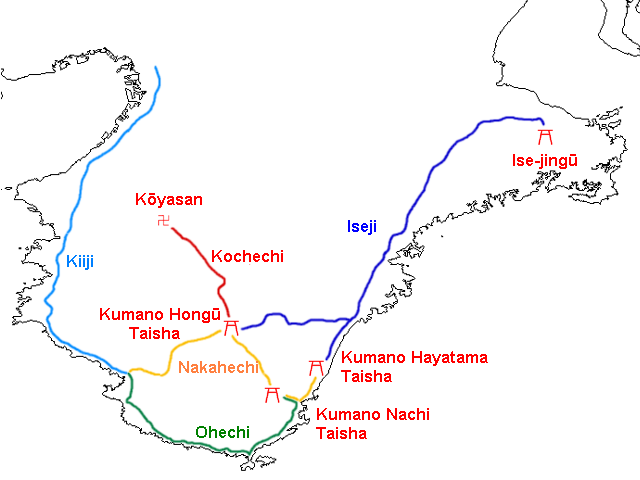
- A map of the main routes of the Kumano Kodō.
- Interactive map of Kumano Kodō (熊野古道)
- Type: Pilgrims' way Sacred space Sacred mountains

UNESCO World Heritage Site
- Official name: Sacred Sites and Pilgrimage Routes in the Kii Mountain Range: Pilgrimage Routes - Kumano Sankeimichi
- Criteria: Cultural: (ii)(iv)(vi)
- Reference: 1142bis
- Inscription: 2004 (28th Session)
- Extensions: 2016
- Area: 506.4 ha (1.955 sq mi)
- Buffer zone: 12,100 ha (47 sq mi)
- Website: https://whc.unesco.org/en/list/1142/
- Location: Mie Prefecture, Nara Prefecture and Wakayama Prefecture

The Kumano Kodō (熊野古道) is a series of ancient pilgrimage routes that crisscross the Kii Peninsula, the largest peninsula of Japan. These mountainous trails are used by pilgrims to the "Kumano Sanzan" (熊野三山) - the Three Grand Shrines of Kumano: Kumano Hongū Taisha (熊野本宮大社), Kumano Nachi Taisha (熊野那智大社) and Kumano Hayatama Taisha (熊野速玉大社). These three shrines are the holiest sites of the ancient syncretic Kumano religion.

It has been visited by pilgrims seeking healing and salvation as a site of religious significance for over a thousand years. People with backgrounds from peasants to emperors would visit the region while guided by Shugendō monks.

In July 2004, some of the roads of the Kumano Kodō and the shrines of the Kumano Sanzan, along with Koyasan and Yoshino and Ōmine, were registered as World Heritage sites together as the "Sacred Sites and Pilgrimage Routes in the Kii Mountain Range".

== History ==
The Kumano Kodō has been used for more than 1,000 years for the purpose of Kumano worship, which flourished as the largest sacred site in Japan during the Middle Ages. (Note: 例えば、かつて十津川街道として知られていたルートは国道168号線に吸収されている。紀伊路（大阪-田辺）が登録外であるのも、県道や登山道などとして改修・拡幅されたことによる。なお、世界遺産に登録されたルートでも、大辺路・伊勢路の大部分は国道42号線と重複している。) In modern times, after its status as Japan's largest sacred site was replaced by that of Ise Shrine, it began to become part of the pilgrimages of the 33 sacred sites of the Kannon in the western part of Japan. Nevertheless, the Kumano Kodō remains as a busy foot pilgrimage in its own right. (Note: 並行している例として、中辺路と国道311号線、JR紀勢本線・国道42号線の紀伊半島部分と大辺路・伊勢路がある。また、小辺路や大峯奥駈道のような例外もある。)

The area around Kumano was a place of nature worship, as mentioned in the Nihon Shoki (Chronicles of Japan). The three Kumano mountains were worshipped by people from all walks of life, from emperors to aristocrats and commoners.

In the Muromachi period (1333-1573), Kumano pilgrimages became popular among samurai and common people and not just aristocrats, and were so frequent and continuous that they were even called a "pilgrimage of ants".

In the Edo period (1603-1867), Kumano pilgrimages, along with Ise pilgrimages, are said to have become widely practiced by the general public. At one time, 800 people were recorded to have stayed overnight in inns near Kumano in a single day.

The number of shrines around the Kumano Kodō was drastically reduced due to the "Shrine Combining Order" issued at the end of 1906 (Meiji 39) as part of the Meiji Restoration. This order saw Buddhist and Shinto shrines separated and Buddhist elements destroyed, while many natural sites which had been preserved by the shrines were also destroyed. Some of these natural sites were protected by the pioneering work of ecologist Minakata Kumagusu who extensively studied and fought for the protection of the ecosystems of the region.

The Kumano Kodō itself continued to be used as a road for daily life until the national highway was constructed from the Taisho era (1912-1926) to the Showa era (1926-1989).

Until recent decades, the custom of Kumano pilgrimages had almost disappeared. Currently, the Wakayama Prefectural Tourism Promotion Division is playing a central role in developing the routes and making it a tourist attraction by organizing stamp rallies and other events.

In September 2011, many people died and infrastructure and geology in the area was heavily damaged by landslides and flooding caused by Tropical Storm Talas (Typhoon #12). As of 2023, there are parts of the routes still to be repaired. However, there have also been substantial investments in new tourist infrastructure such as an art museum in Chikatsuyu and large tourist centres and displays in towns along the route.

=== Imperial pilgrimages ===
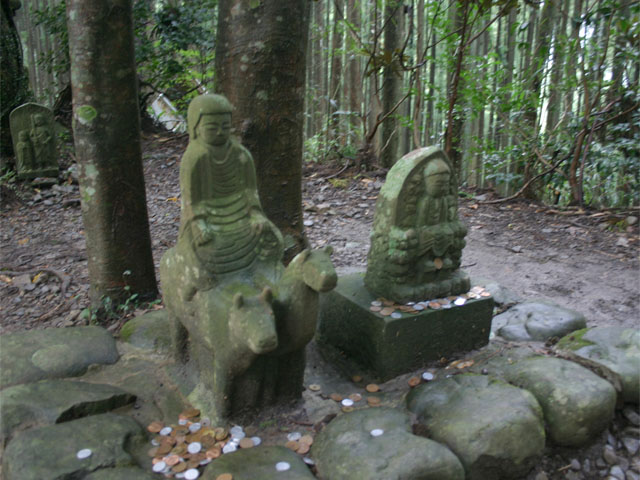
Gyuba-doji, a statue of the young Emperor Kazan on pilgrimage riding a horse and a cow. The emperor named the area Chikatsuyu.

The first imperial visit to the area is said to have been the Kumano Gokou by Emperor Uda in 908 during the mid-Heian period. The term Kumano Gokou (熊野御幸) refers to the emperor's pilgrimage to Kumano, which took place 94 times over a period of 374 years until the Kumano Gokou of Emperor Kameyama in 1281.

In the 11th and 12th centuries, the retired emperors of the Insei period began to make repeated pilgrimages to Kumano. It is said that the beginning of frequent pilgrimages to the three Kumano mountains began with the retired Emperor Shirakawa's Kumano Gokou in 1090. In total, Emperor Shirakawa made nine visits to Kumano. This led to an upsurge in the number of empresses and other court ladies and nobles accompanying the emperor and the Cloistered Emperor, and later to independent Kumano pilgrimages among the Kyoto nobility. Later, Emperor Go-Shirakawa also made 33 visits to Kumano.

According to the diary of Fujiwara no Teika, who accompanied Emperor Go-Toba on his Kumano pilgrimage in 1201 during the Kamakura period (1185-1333), the journey was made on foot in principle, with luggage carried on horseback, and the roads were maintained accordingly. During this period, the shrine was worshipped by the Minamoto and Taira clans, and was visited by Ippen and Mongaku, priests of the Heian and Kamakura periods. Hojo Masako, wife of Minamoto no Yoritomo, also made two pilgrimages to Kumano on her way to Kyoto from Kamakura. Furthermore, after the Jokyu Disturbance (1221), local samurai also began to make pilgrimages.

== Kumano Sanzan ==
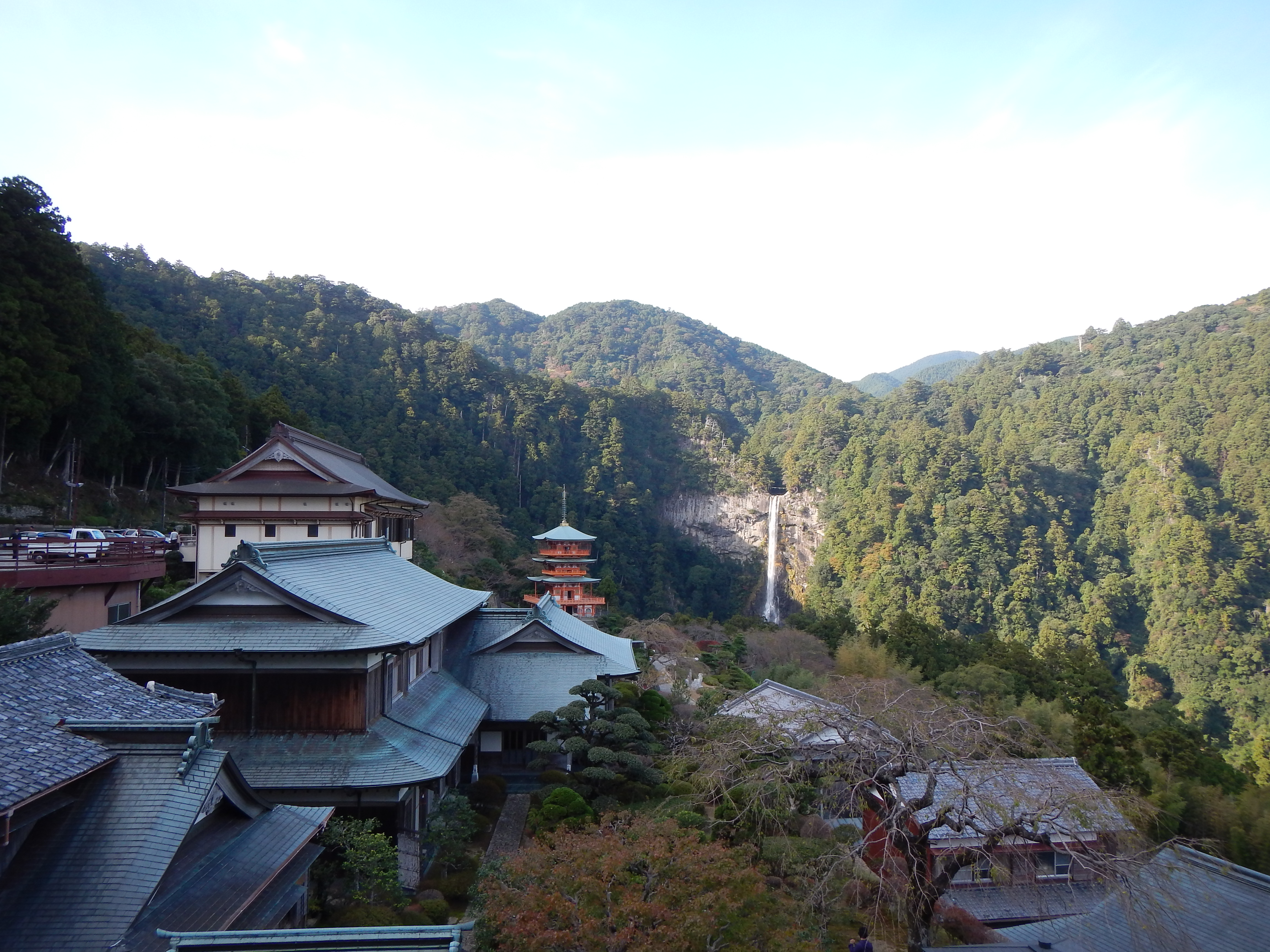
Nachi Falls in the background of the Kumano Nachi Taisha shrine complex. The pagoda is Seiganto-ji.

The three shrines which enshrine each of the Kumano Gongen are the guiding destinations of the pilgrimage. The shrines are visited today by visitors travelling via car, bus, and on foot.

== Kumano faith ==
The Kumano Gongen are the deities that are revered by the Kumano faith. As a syncretic religion, the Kumano faith carries elements of Shinto, Shugendo, mountain worship, and Buddhism, among others, and is sacred to each of these religions. They are themselves seen as aspects of their respective Shinto and Buddhist deities. They are embodied in natural wonders - Nachi Falls, a giant boulder at Mount Gongenyama, and the sacred Kumano River. The gods are said to have descended to Earth at a rock at the summit of Mount Gongenyama, which is adjacent to Shingu. As the faith was proselytized throughout Japan, hundreds of local shrines were created to worship the Kumano gods. The faith was offered as one that is open to people from any background, especially to women who were banned from other sacred sites in Japan. Local shrines allowed the devout to worship the Kumano faith without having to take the extremely arduous journey to the Kumano Sanzan.

The completion of the pilgrimage is said to automatically grant entrance into the bodhisattva of compassion Kannon's pure land upon death. The holy land of the Kumano region increases in sacredness until reaching the epicentre at Hongu. The region itself can be seen as the land of the dead, or a pure land on Earth. For Shugendo practitioners, walking the routes through the sacred mountains form and reinforce sacred mandalas.

Table showing the syncretism of the Kumano deities
Grand Shrine	Buddhist deity	Shinto kami	Kumano deity	Natural object
Hongu	Amida	Susano-no-Mikoto	Ketsumiko-no-Okami	Trees, Kumano-gawa River, Hongu sandbank, nature
Hayatama	Yakushi	Izanagi-no-Mikoto Izanami-no-Mikoto	Kumano-Hayatama-no-Okami Kumano-Fusumi-no-Okami	Gotobiki-iwa rock (at Kamikura Shrine, Shingu), Kumano-gawa River
Nachi	Senju Kannon	Izanami-no-Mikoto	Kumano-Fusumi-no-Okami	Nachi Falls

=== Buddhist elements ===
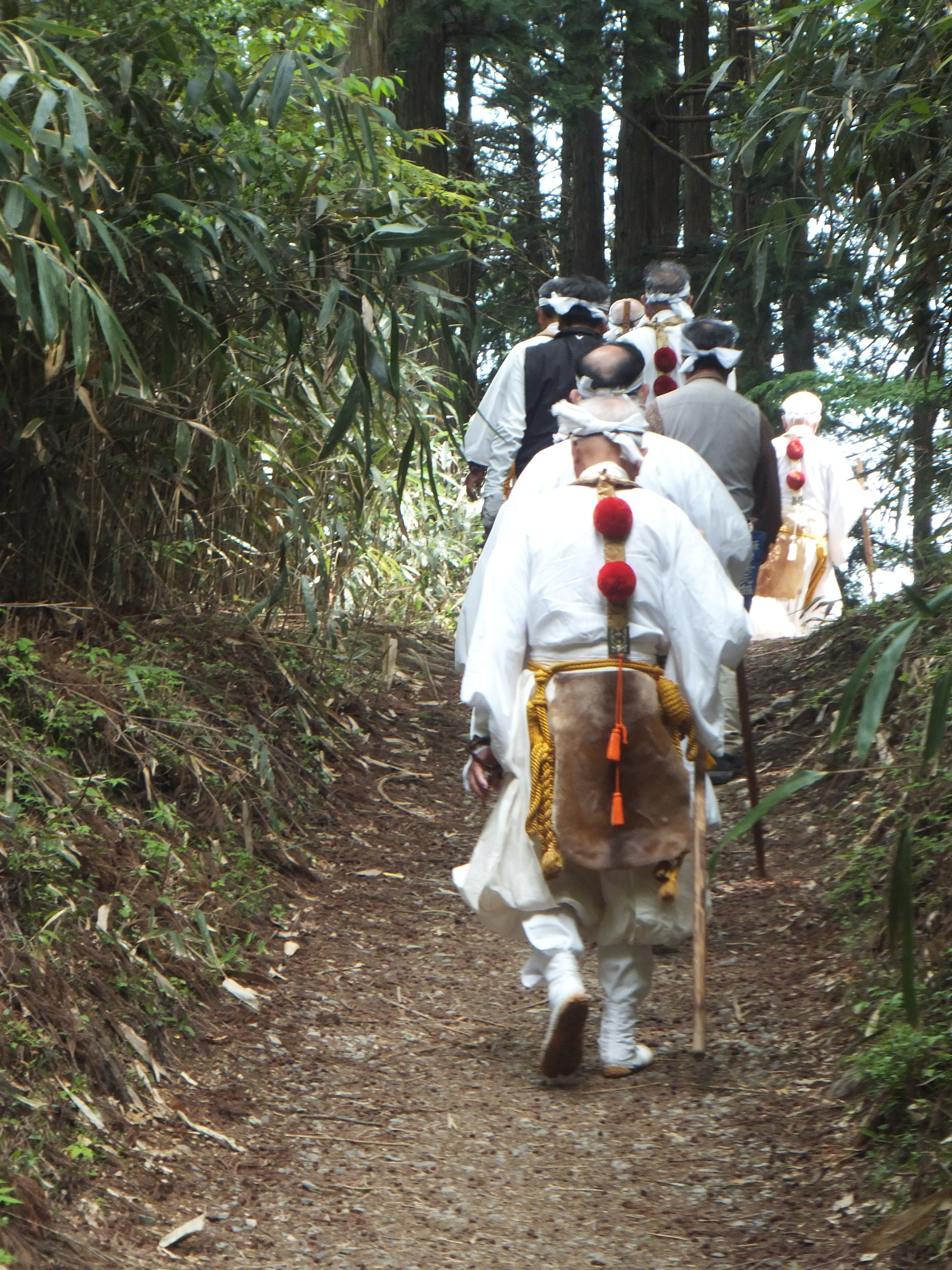
Yamabushi on the Omine route.

The Kumano Gongen are similar to many other gods in Japan, in that they are understood by Buddhists, under the principle of honji suijaku, to be incarnations of buddhas and bodhisattvas. In fact, the word gongen means a buddha manifesting as a kami. There are many Buddhist elements throughout the Kumano Kodo, including hundreds of small Jizo and Kannon statues on the routes, the Kohechi route to the Buddhist centre of Koyasan, the belief in the Kumano region as a pure land, and the co-existence of Buddhist temples within the grand shrine precincts (such as Seiganto-ji). There are many important Buddhist sites along the routes, including mounds with stupas on top where Buddhist scriptures were buried in order to preserve them and obtain merit for the preserver.

=== Shugendo elements ===
Shugendo monks (Yamabushi) have served as guides on the trail since ancient times and form an integral part of the religion of the area. Mount Tamaki and Mount Ōmine are just two of the sacred mountains with significant Shugendo presence in the region.

=== Shinto elements ===
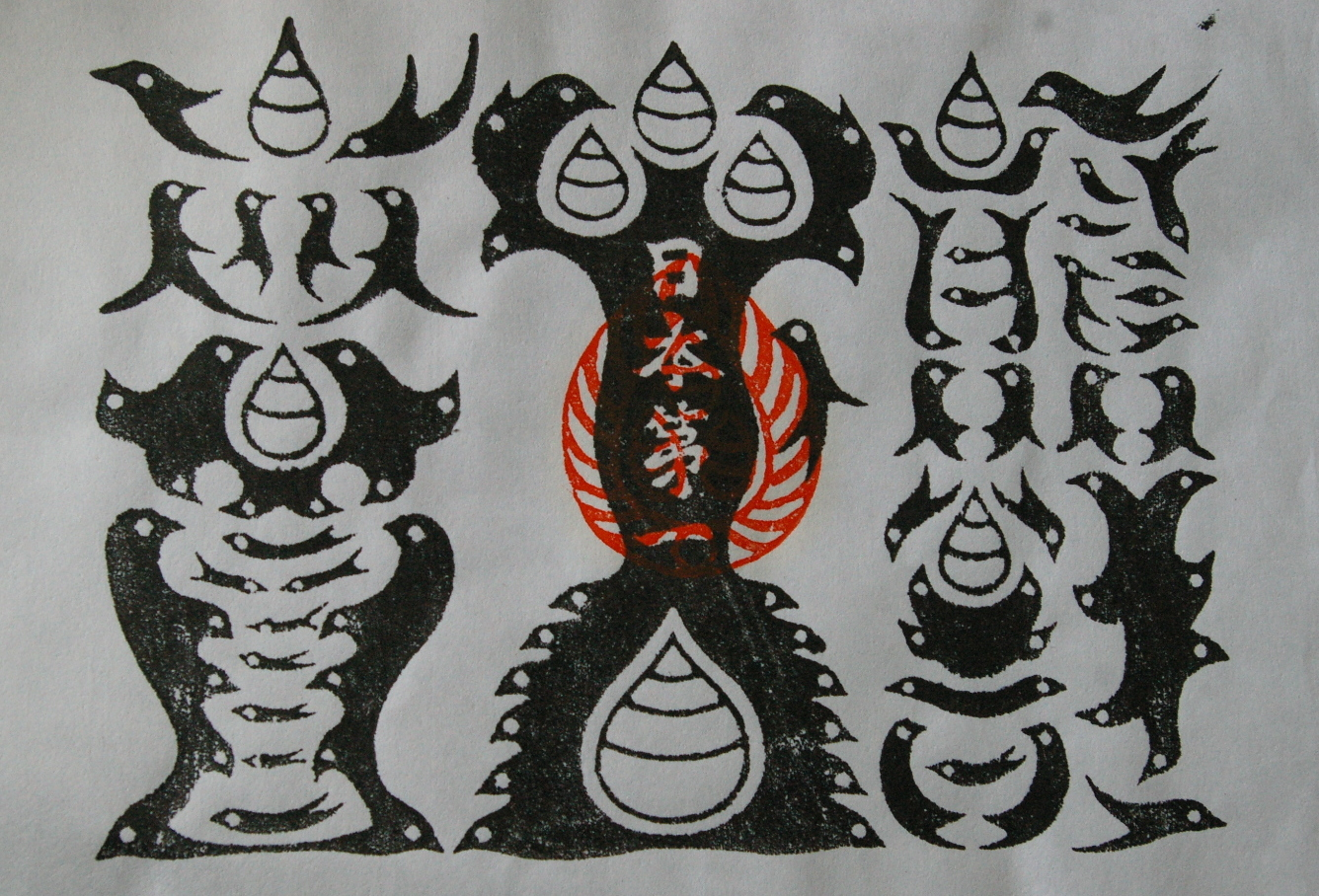
Gyuoh Hoin talisman from Kumano Hongu Taisha.

Shinto shrines (jinja) are extremely common throughout the region and on the trails. Some of the most common shrines in the region hold the gods Susano, Amaterasu and Inari. There are also many shrines that contain local kami, and kami that inhabit natural features. Some of these shrines hold the spirits of Imperial officials and warriors, or have stories pertaining to imperial pilgrimages.

The pilgrimage became popular among boatbuilders and fishermen as it is said to be where Susano created the first boat after witnessing a drowning spider climb onto a leaf.

The Kumano Gongen are also understood as manifestations of Shinto deities, in the same way that the Buddhist deities are. This is an example of shinbutsu-shūgō, or Buddhist-Shinto syncretism.

There are also many yokai said to inhabit the region. Among these are the daru spirits, serpentine witch beings who can turn invisible and penetrate a pilgrim's body to apply physical torments.

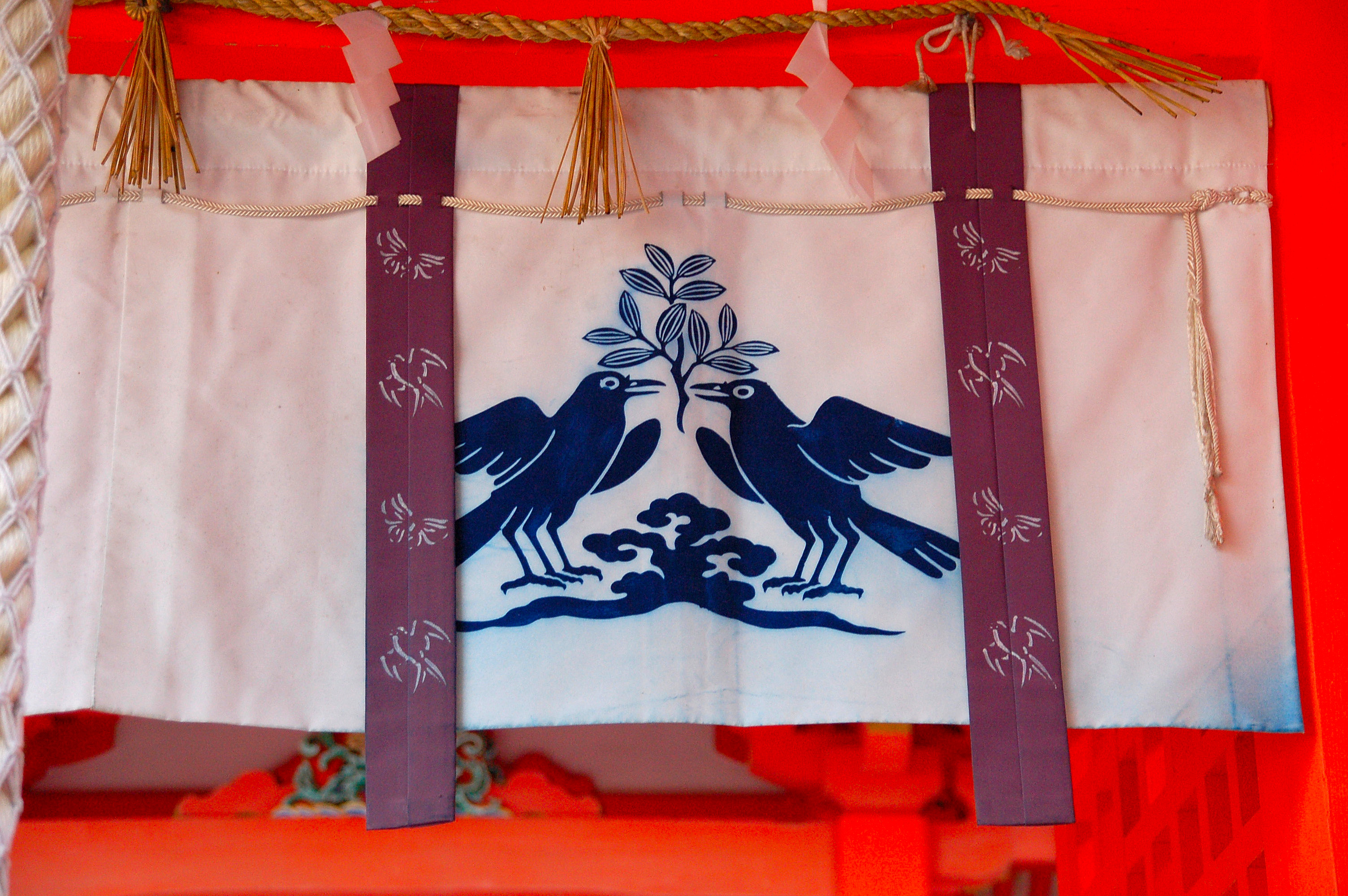
A depiction of Yatagarasu at Kumano Nachi Taisha.

=== Yatagarasu ===
Yagarasu, the three-legged crow, is a ubiquitous symbol of the Kumano region. They have a dedicated shrine at the Kumano Nachii Taisha complex. This crow god is said to have been sent from heaven as a guide for legendary Emperor Jimmu on his last climactic battle to become the first Japanese Emperor; together they travelled from Shingu in the Kumano region to what would become Yamato. Crows are depicted on the sacred Gyuoh Hoin (熊野牛王符) amulets and omamori available at the shrines.

=== Kōshin ===
While not as popular today, the ancient Kōshin religion persists along the Kumano Kodo in the form of monuments and shrines. One of the central features of this religion is the belief that three parasites live in the human body and will ascend to heaven once a month to report the person's sins. As this occurred at night, it became custom to stay awake and revel all night on this day each month.

== Oji shrines ==
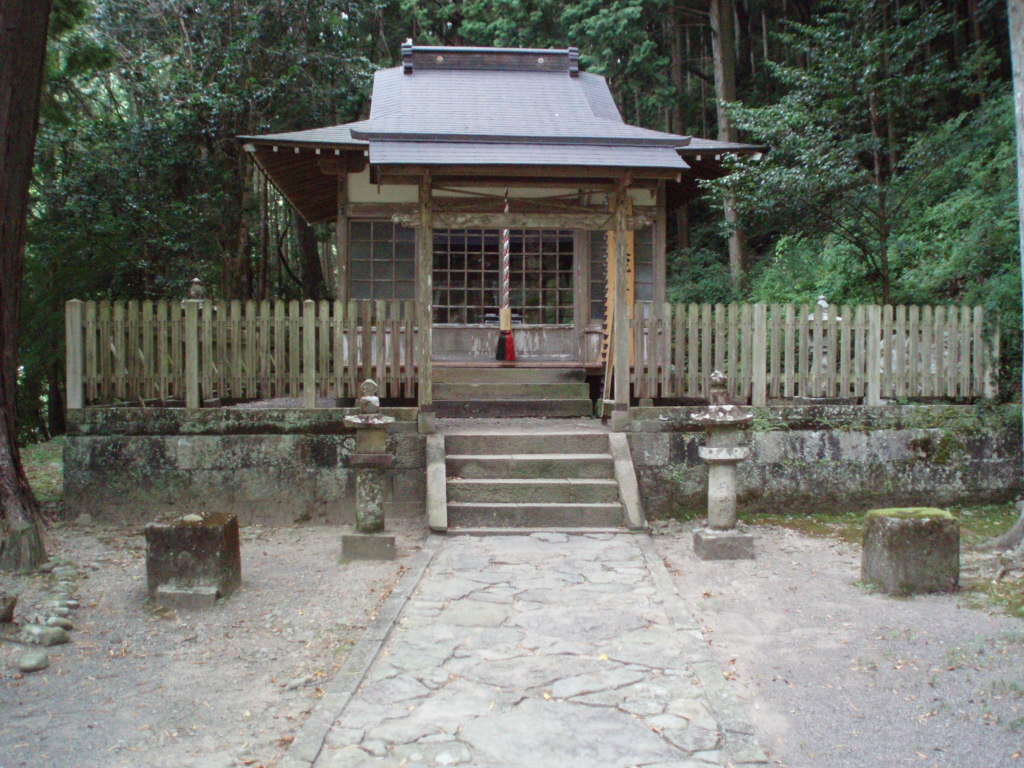
Takijiri-oji shrine, the formal entryway into the holy land of Kumano.

The 99 'princes' are shrines which were established mainly from the 12th to 13th centuries. These are found from Watanobe-tsu (Kubotsu, Kuhonetsu) at the mouth of the Yodo River, which was the base of the Kumano Kodō (especially Kii-ji and Nakabe-ji) in Osaka, to the Kumano Sanzan (three mountains). Pilgrims walked to the Kumano Sanzan, resting at the 99 Oji shrines. Few of them still exist today in their original condition.

== Routes ==
There are many routes that make up the broader Kumano Kodō pilgrimage. Not all of these routes are intended to be traversed in one trip, as they originate from different locations, and some lesser known routes are not in use. Additionally, not all of the routes have World Heritage status either.

The name Kumano Kodō today primarily refers to the following six main roads:

- Kiiji (Watanobe-tsu - Tanabe)
- Kohechi (Koyasan - Kumano Sanzan, approx. 70 km)
- Nakahechi (Tanabe - Kumano Sanzan)
- Ohechi (Tanabe - Kushimoto - Kumano Sanzan, approx. 120 km)
- Iseji (Ise Jingu - Kumano Sanzan, approx. 160 km)
- Omine Okugakemichi (Yoshino - Kumano Sanzan).

=== Kiiji ===
The Kiiji route runs along the west coast of the peninsula from Kyoto to Tanabe, where it forks into two more routes: Nakahechi; and Ohechi. The Kiiji route was frequented by the emperors as they travelled many times throughout their lives from the imperial capital of Kyoto. Today, the majority of the Kiiji route is paved roads and rural and urban areas that show little resemblance to the past. It is not part of the World Heritage listing.

=== Ohechi ===
The Ohechi route continues south along the coast from Tanabe to Shingu. While there is tourist information available for this route, it is not frequently travelled today and is primarily freeways which can make it dangerous for a walker to traverse. The Ohechi route is more modern than the other routes and was established as an easier route to bypass the mountains.

=== Nakahechi ===
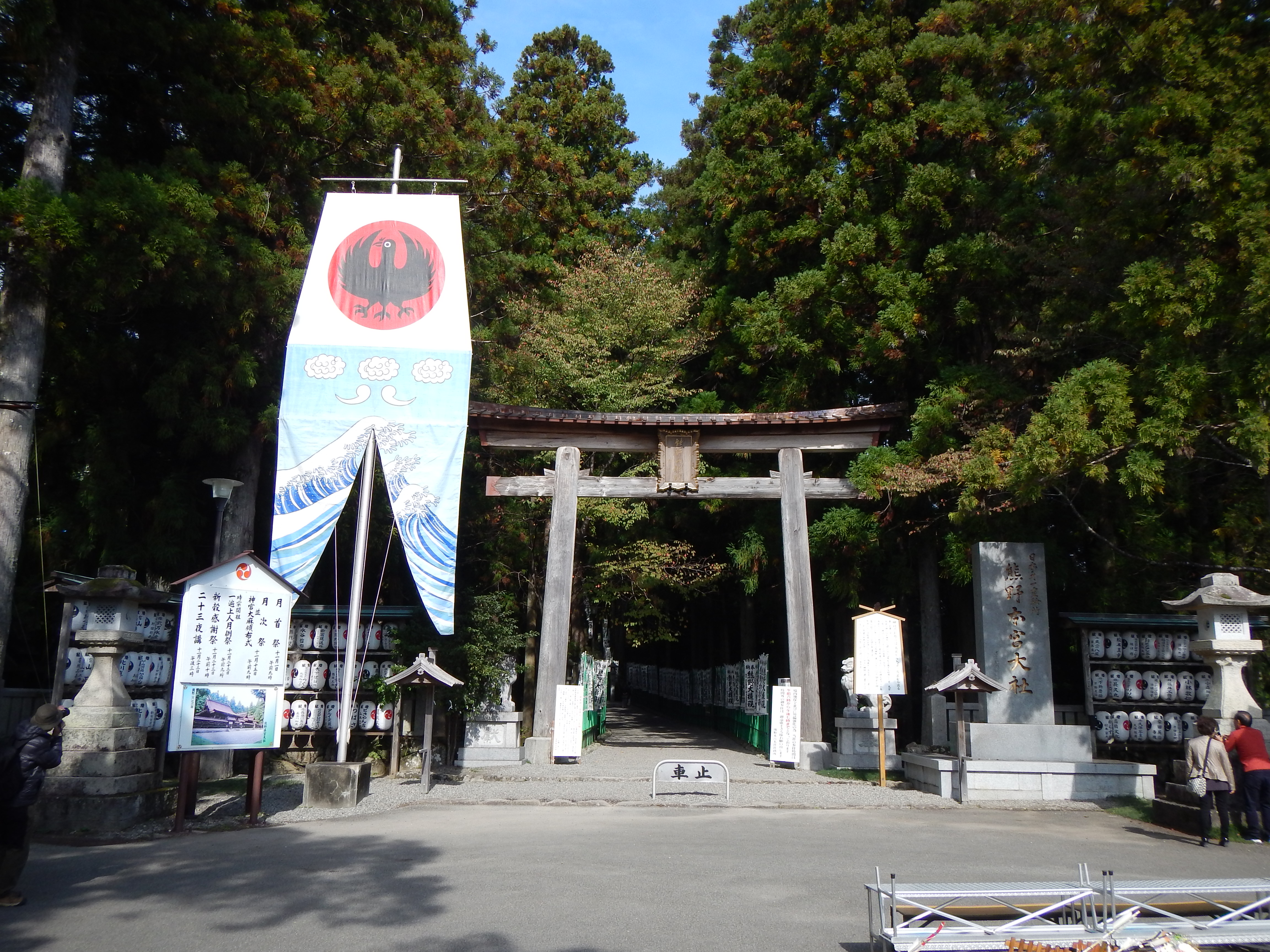
The entrance to Kumano Hongu Taisha and terminus of the first leg of the Nakahechi.

The Nakahechi route leads into the rugged interior mountains toward Kumano Hongū Taisha. The main route covers the distance from Tanabe to Hongū and then the Nakahechi continues on to Nachi and Shingu. From Hongū, most pilgrims would take a boat down the Kumano River to Kumano Hayatama Taisha. The Nakahechi route was the most popular for pilgrimages from Kyoto, the ancient capital of Japan. The earliest records of this route dates from the early 10th century. The trail has a long history of use by people with diverse belief backgrounds, leading to mixed religious symbolism overlaid and incorporated into the setting and stages of the pilgrimage.

The UNESCO World Heritage registered section begins at Takijiri-oji, which is considered to be the point of entry to the sacred area of Kumano. From here it is about 37 km of mountainous trail before one reaches Kumano Hongū Taisha. Most pilgrimages break the journey into a two-day walk, stopping in the village of Chikatsuyu about halfway.

==== Dainichi-goe and Akagi-goe ====
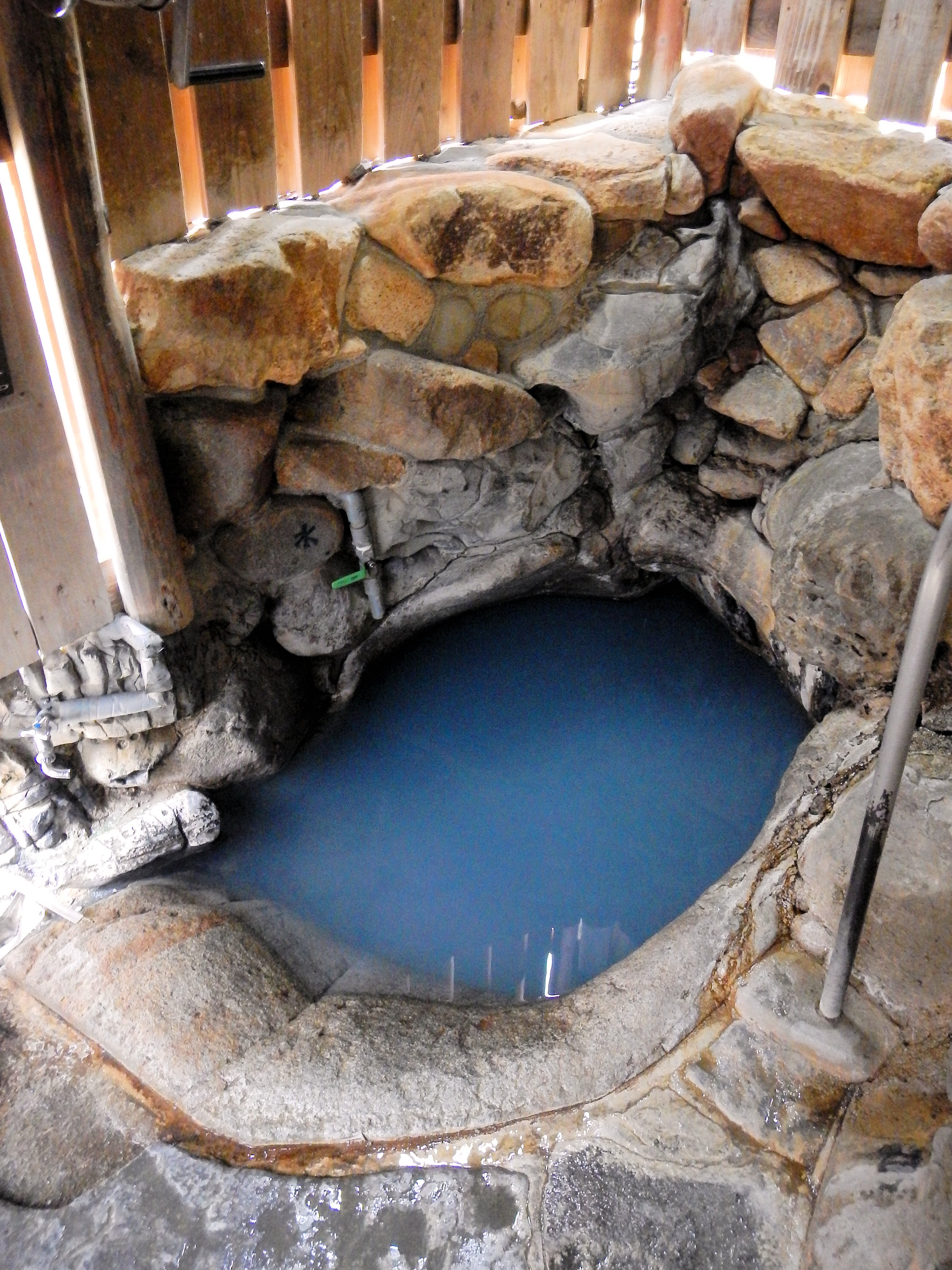
Tsuboyu, ancient onsen at Yunomine.

The Dainichi-goe route links Kumano Hongū Taisha with Yunomine Onsen. It is two kilometres long and traverses a small but relatively steep pass. The Yunomine hot spring and the Tsuboyu stone bath were used for purification rites and their legendary healing effects.

The Akagi-goe is a relatively recent route that was established within the last few hundred years to reach Yunomine more quickly from the west before continuing onto Hongū. It covers 6.5 km from Mikoshi-toge pass to Yunomine onsen and is a relatively leisurely walk along steep mountain ridges. There are no oji shrines on the route.

Modern pilgrims may combine these walks with a segment of the Nakahechi to form a loop that takes a day to complete from Hongū or Yunomine.

==== Kumano-gawa ====
The Kumano-gawa was the primary route continuing on from the 'main route' of the Nakahechi. From the Kumano Hongū Taisha, most pilgrims went by boat on the Kumano River to Kumano Hayatama Taisha in the coastal town of Shingū. This 40 km section of the Kumano Kodō is the only river pilgrimage route that is registered as a World Heritage site. Today, the route is seasonally serviced by a traditional boat tour from March to November. Pilgrims would then double back to Nachi to visit the Kumano Nachi Taisha.

==== Kogumotori-goe and Ogumotori-goe ====
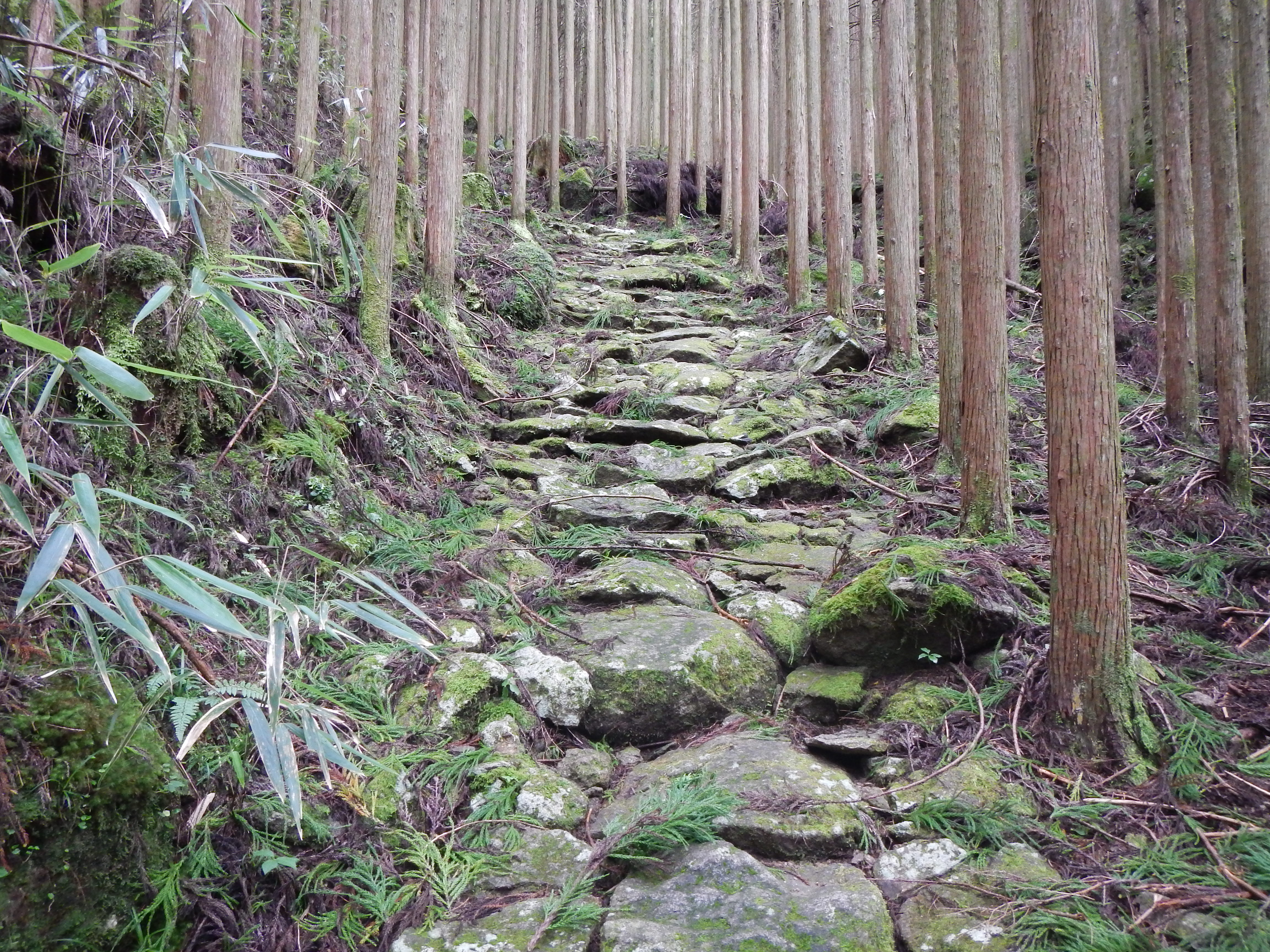
Steep cobblestones on the Ogumotori-goe road.

These overland routes links the Kumano Hongū Taisha with the Kumano Nachi Taisha. Most pilgrims take two days to complete this walk, staying overnight in the small town of Koguchi. The section between Hongū and Koguchi is called the Kogumotori-goe. The section between Koguchi and Kumano Nachi Taisha is called the Ogumotori-goe and features the hardest part of the whole pilgrimage, the Dogiri-zaka or 'backbreaking slope' which climbs 800 metres in elevation over five kilometres to reach the Echizen-toge pass.

==== Nachi to Shingu ====
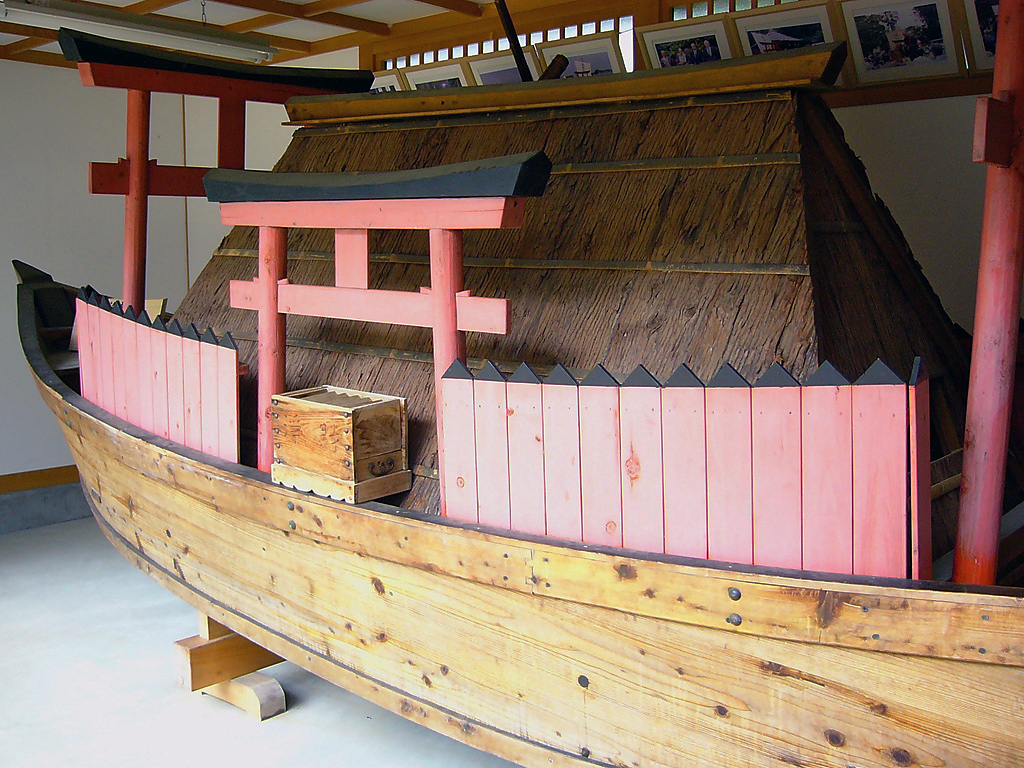
A reproduction of a boat used by the Fudarakusanji monks setting off for the southern pure land.

From Nachi, a pilgrim can continue onwards to finish their pilgrimage in Shingu. This route travels from Nachi through rural suburbs until reaching the seaside town of Nachikatsuura, where Fudarakusan-ji temple is located. This temple was a base for Kumano monks who would be sealed in enclosed boats with a small amount of supplies and sent off into the Philippine Sea to find the southern pure land. Here, pilgrims would perform salt-water purification. The route then continues roughly perpendicular to the coast and Kinokuni JR train-line and follows the freeway and local streets. While today most people take a bus from Nachi, there are further World Heritage passes including the ruins of the Monkey Tea House and the Koyazaka Slope which can only be reached on foot while travelling from Nachi through Ugui and onwards to Shingu.

=== Kohechi ===
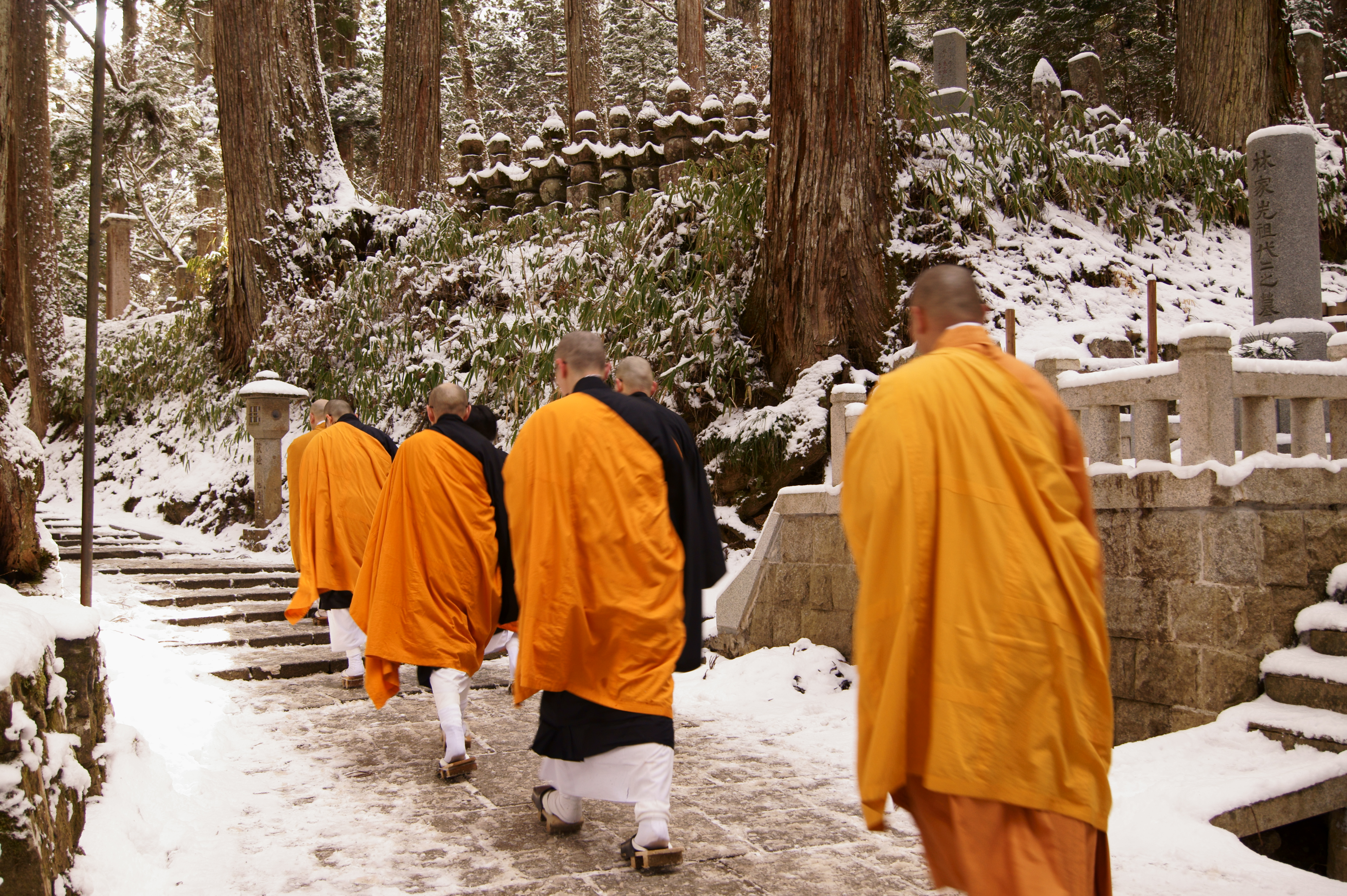
Buddhist monks at Mount Koya, the start of the Kohechi route.

The "Kohechi" route links Koyasan to the Kumano Sanzan. It runs north to south and is 65 km long. It is the shortest route connecting Koyasan to Kumano. It is a tough walk that traverses three passes with elevation gains of over 1,000 meters.

=== Iseji ===
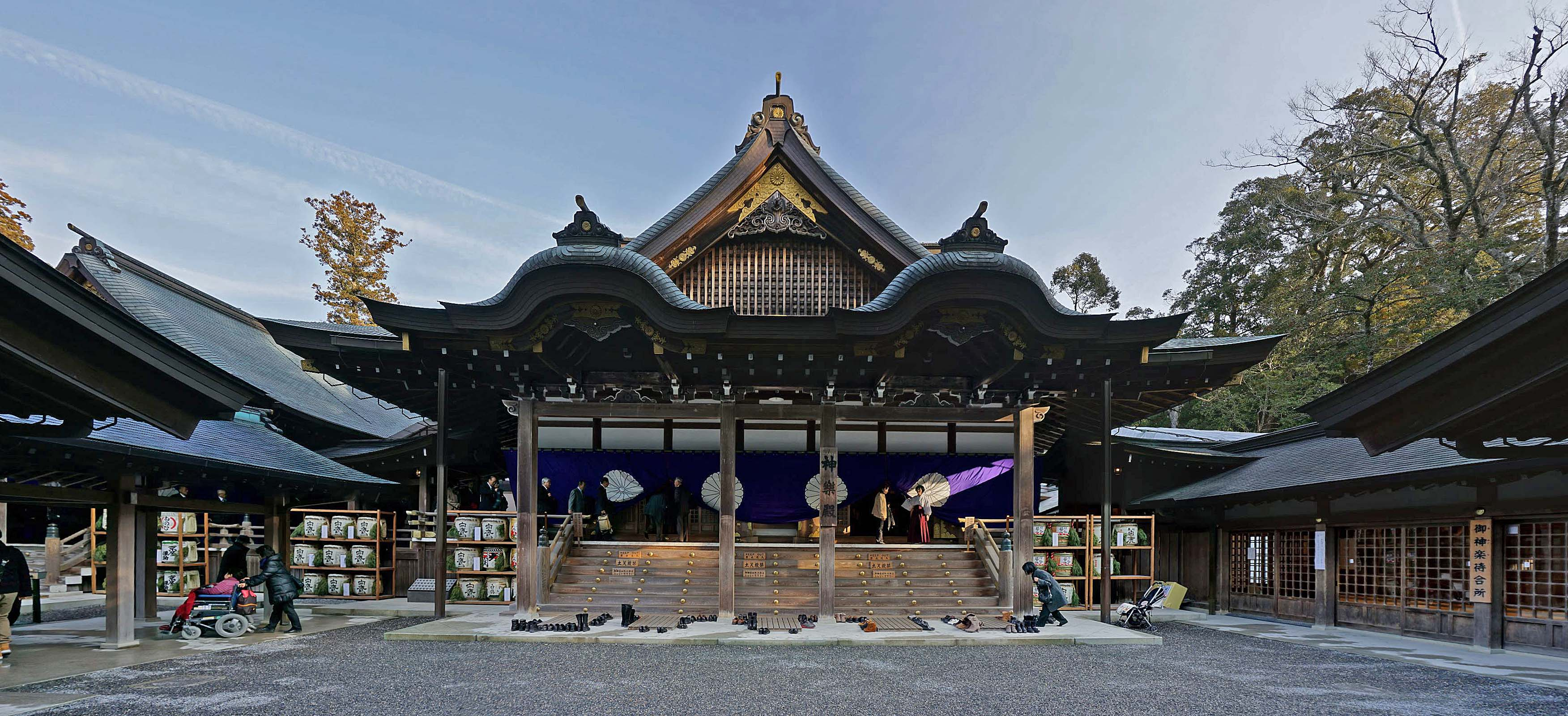
Ise Grand Shrine Naikū

The "Iseji" route links Ise Grand Shrine with the Kumano Sanzan. In the 17th century this route became part of the Saigoku pilgrimage. The first temple is Seiganto-ji, which shares the same grounds with Kumano Nachi Taisha.

Some pilgrims (ohenro) also combine the Iseji route with the Shikoku pilgrimage, starting from Ise Grand Shrine and following the Iseji to the Nakahechi and onwards to Shikoku.

The "Magose Toge" forms the boundary between Miyama, Kyoto and Owase, Mie. A moss-covered stone path stretches about 2 km into the cypress forest covered with ferns. This route leads to Tengura-san with a huge stone at the tip. A small tunnel below the stone can be entered. From the stone is a view of Owase City. Magose-koen Park on the way down the pass is renowned for its cherry blossoms.

Today, much of the Iseji walk is on paved roads through urban and rural coastal areas.

=== Ōmine Okugakemichi ===
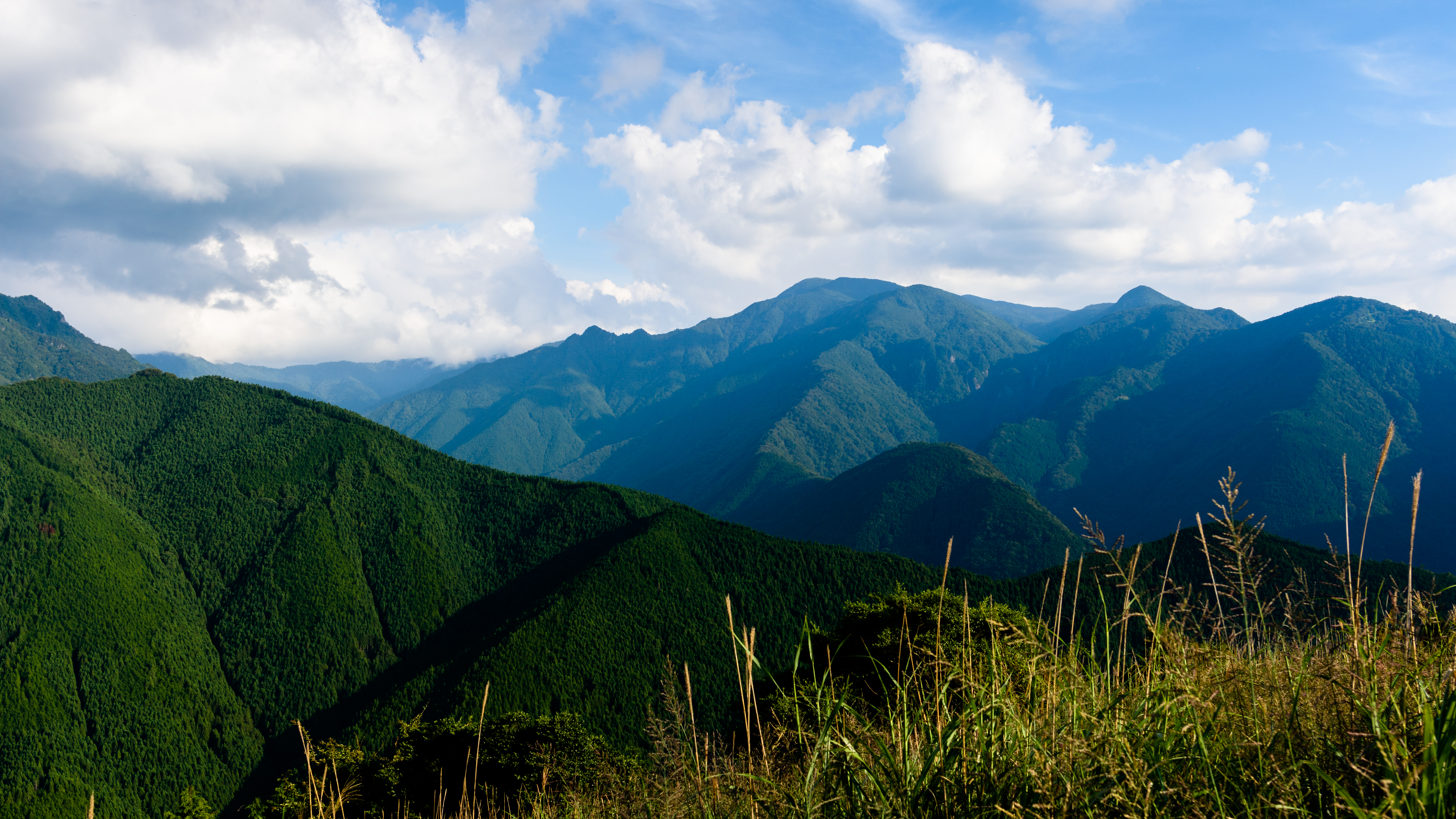
Mount Ōmine next to Mount Misen, an example of the 'ocean of mountains' in the region.

The route connecting Mount Ōmine to the Kumano Sanzan is an extremely steep and difficult one traversed by yamabushi (Shugendo monks) of Shogo-in temple in Kyoto as part of their religious practice. In winter the route is so dangerous that even the yamabushi do not generally travel it. On this route ascetic practices such as immersion in frozen waterfalls are conducted by the monks. Women travelling the route must bypass Mount Ōmine itself as it is forbidden for women to enter.

== Rediscovered routes ==
There were many routes in the Kii Peninsula that have become hidden or lost over time, but while these are not part of the World Heritage designation, they may also be considered part of the Kumano Kodō.

=== Okuhechi ===
Okuhechi (奥辺路) is a forgotten seventh Kumano Kodō (pilgrimage route) to Kumano Hongu Taisha Shrine currently being researched and developed. The route from Koyasan, passes through Gomadanzan and Ryujin Onsen, branching off at the foot of Kasatayama, crossing the Hatenashi range along the Niu River, and joining the Kohechi at Totsukawa Onsen. The route then continues south to join the Nakahechi. Although it runs parallel to the west side of the Kohechi, it passes through Koya-cho, Katsuragi-cho, Aritagawa-cho, and Tanabe City in Wakayama Prefecture according to the current administrative divisions (the latter half of the route that crosses the Hatenashi Mountains enters Nara Prefecture).

Its existence has been remembered and passed down by local elders, and local volunteers have been working to identify and maintain the buried old road, referring to the description in the town magazine of the former Shimizu Town.

=== Ogurimichi ===
There is a forgotten eighth road, Ogurimichi, which runs from southern Osaka to Kumano Hongu via Tanabe City. It is a popular name derived from the legend of the revival of Ogurihangan. The route was used from the Edo period to the beginning of the Showa period by disabled people and people suffering from leprosy. These people would travel to Kumano Hongu Shrine and the Yunomine Onsen baths in the hope of being cured of their illnesses. The section of the Oguri that is parallel to the Nakahechi is isolated from the general pilgrims as it was considered impure. This section is considered to be in particularly good condition. The Oguri Road reveals the more negative aspects of the Kumano Kodō, a pilgrimage on which many would die while travelling it, but it also shows the depth and diversity of the Kumano faith which has been open to the prayers of many different people.

== Geography ==
One of the features of the Kumano Kodō is that the original stone pavement remains in many areas, such as the Daimonzaka slope. The reason for the use of cobblestones is that the Kii Peninsula is one of the areas in Japan with the highest rainfall.

There are many historic sites such as village ruins, teahouse and inn ruins, gravesites, markers of Imperial visits, Ichirizuka (waypoint mounds maintained by the Kishu Clan during the Edo Period), shrines, and Buddhist stupas where scrolls were buried.

Some of the Kumano Kodō routes overlap with national roads and urban routes and have been paved and shared with cars. For example, the route formerly known as the Totsukawa Kaido has been absorbed into Route 168 and most of the Ohechi and Iseji routes overlap with National Route 42. The reason why the Kiiji route is not World Heritage registered is because it was repaired and widened as a prefectural road and a mountain trail. This is related to the geography of the Kii Peninsula. The central part of the Kii Peninsula is covered with endless mountains and valleys, although there are no prominent high mountains. For this reason, it has been difficult since ancient times to develop transportation, and the places suitable for traffic have been limited. This is still the case today, and as a result, the main modern transportation routes parallel or overlap with the paths pioneered by the ancients. Examples of parallel routes include the Nakahechi and National Route 311, the Kii Peninsula portion of the JR Kisei Main Line and National Route 42, and the Ohechi and Iseji roads. There are also exceptions such as Kobeji and Omine Okugakemichi.

== World Heritage Site registration ==
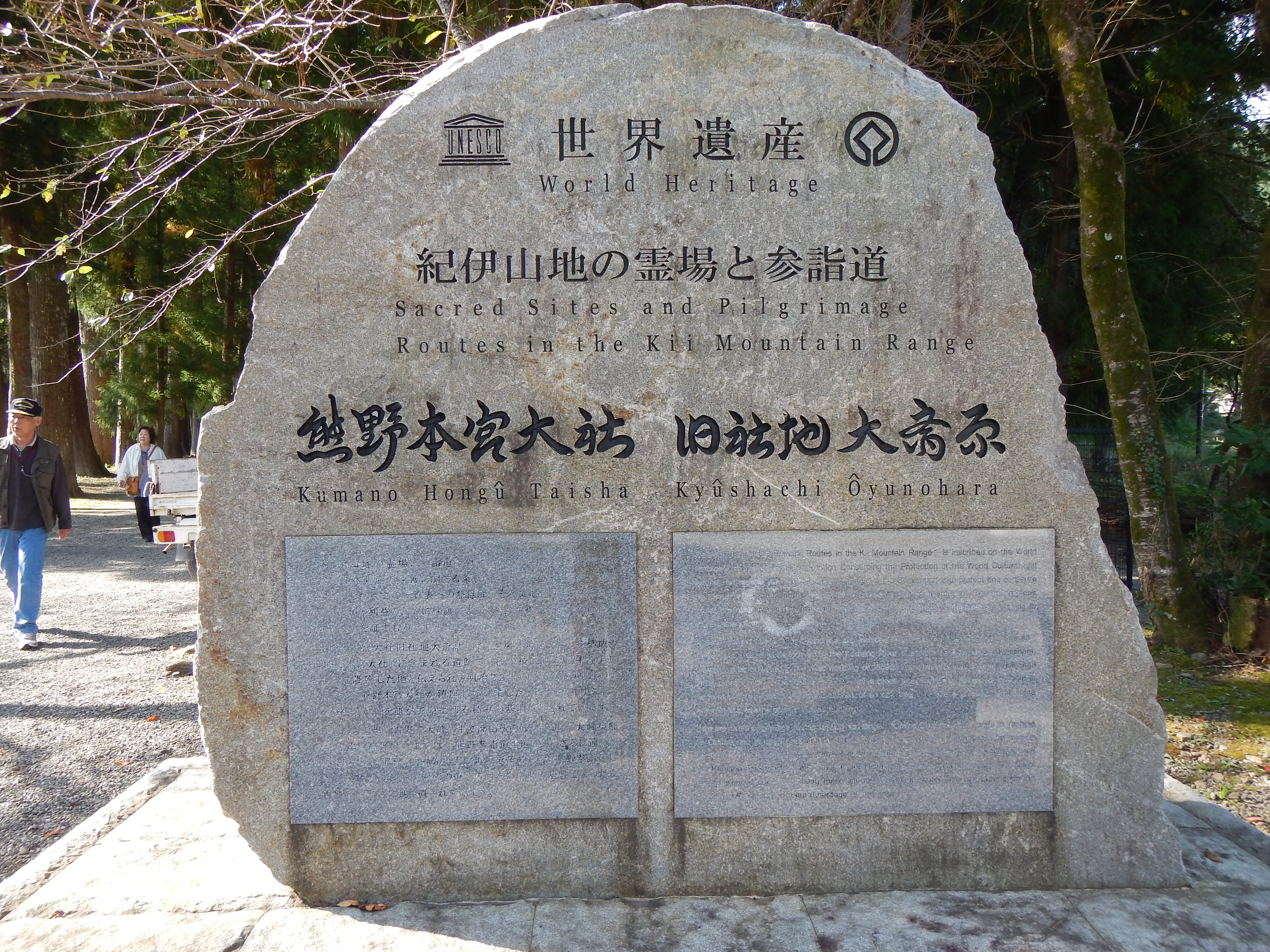
UNESCO World Heritage monument on the Dainichigoe road.

In 2004, Kumano Kodō was registered as a World Heritage Site by UNESCO as part of "Sacred Sites and Pilgrimage Routes in the Kii Mountain Range" ("Monuments and Cultural Landscapes" under "Cultural Heritage"). This was the first time in Japan that a road was registered as a World Heritage site, and the second case of a World Heritage site as a whole, following the "Pilgrimage Route of Santiago de Compostela" in Spain. However, the Kii Road is not included in the list of World Heritage sites. Kiiji was the most frequently used road until the present day, and as a result of gradual structural improvements to the road over the course of history, it inevitably lost its appearance as a pilgrimage route in the past, making it difficult to be accepted as a World Heritage site.

The World Heritage list is not the entirety of the Kumano Kodō. This is due to the following reasons: the exact route of the Kumano pilgrimage itself has waxed and waned, and some sections of the route are still unknown; some of the routes are derived from historical changes, and not all of them are included; some sections have to be detoured when rivers rise; and some coastal "roads" are not safe to travel along. There is a local movement to rediscover other "forgotten" routes of the Kumano Kodō.

=== Sister pilgrimage with the Camino de Santiago ===
Galicia, Spain, the final destination of the "Pilgrimage Route to Santiago de Compostela," a World Heritage Site, and Wakayama Prefecture, the final destination of the Kumano Kodō, concluded a sister road affiliation on October 9, 1998, in order to establish a lasting friendly relationship as the final destination of both ancient pilgrimage routes[7]. 7]. Since then, "Sacred Sites and Pilgrimage Routes in the Kii Mountain Range," including the Kumano Kodō, have also been registered as UNESCO World Heritage sites, thus continuing the exchange between the World Heritage sites of the roads [Note 3]. Pilgrims that have completed both the Spanish and Japanese pilgrimages can receive a certificate of 'Dual-pilgrimage'.

== Gallery ==
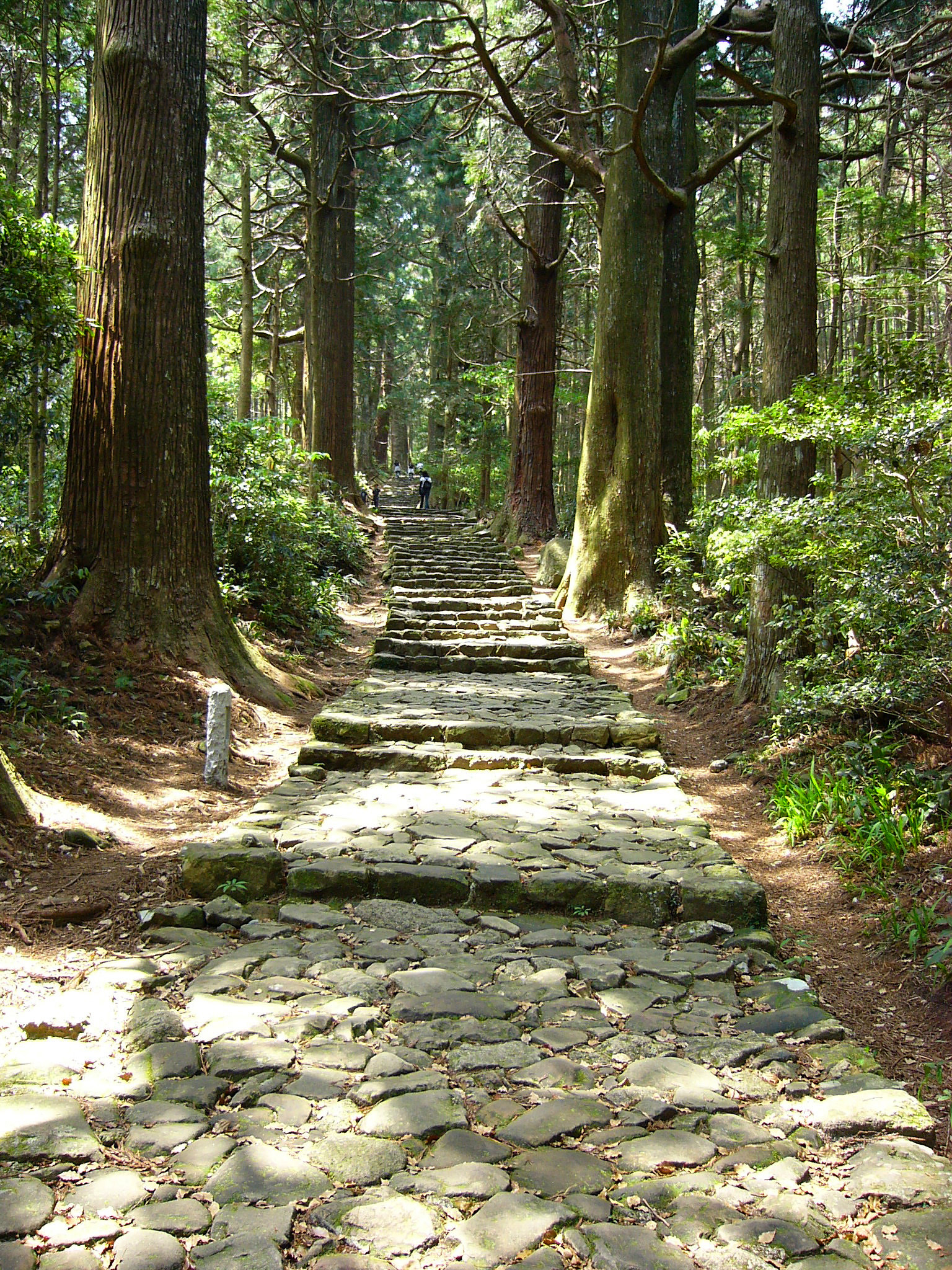
Daimonzaka.

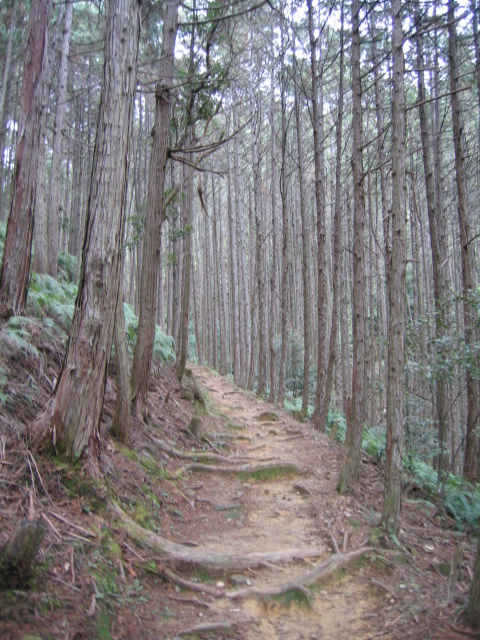
Part of the Kumano Kodō near the Yunomine Onsen.

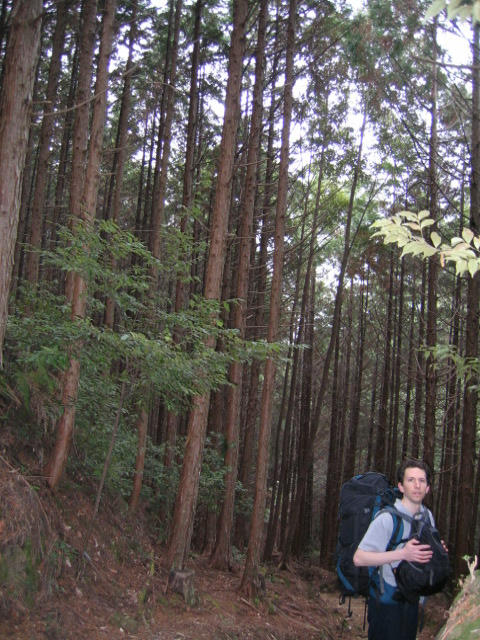
A traveler on the Kumano Kodō.

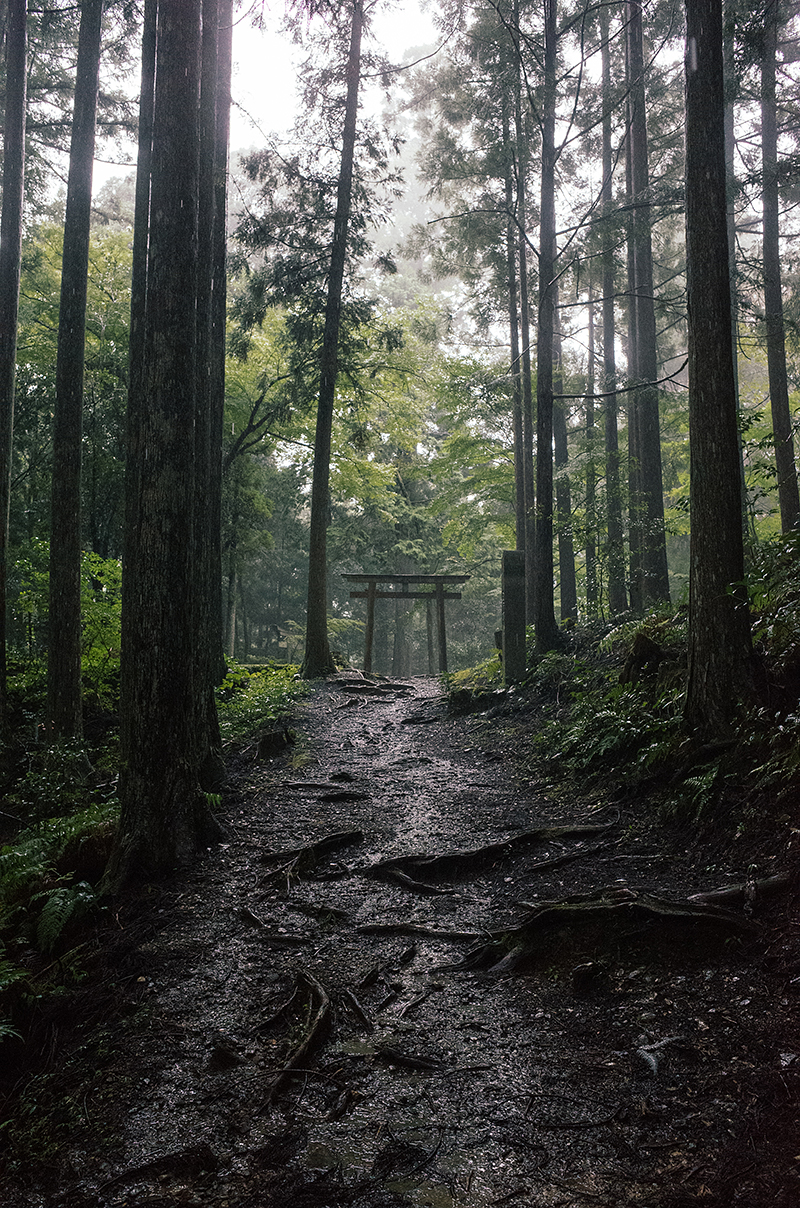
The Kumano Kodō near Hosshinmon-oji.

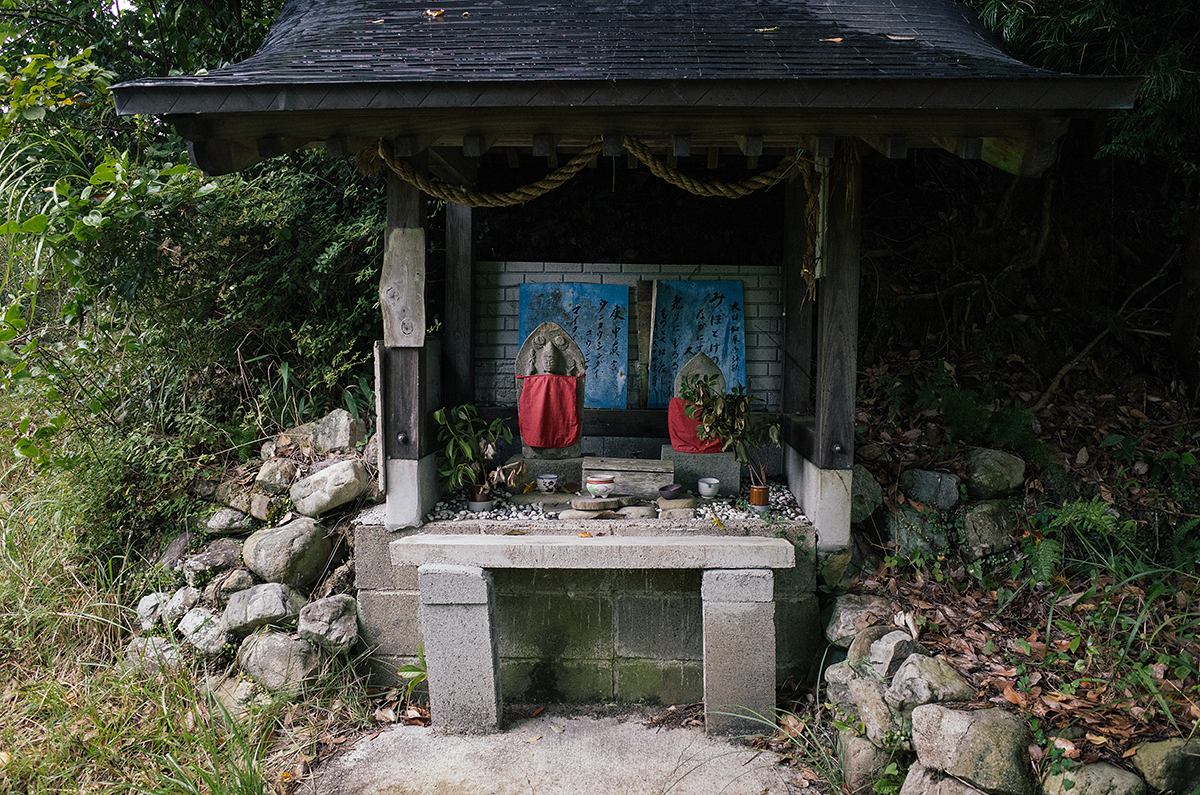
A small shrine near Takahara village.

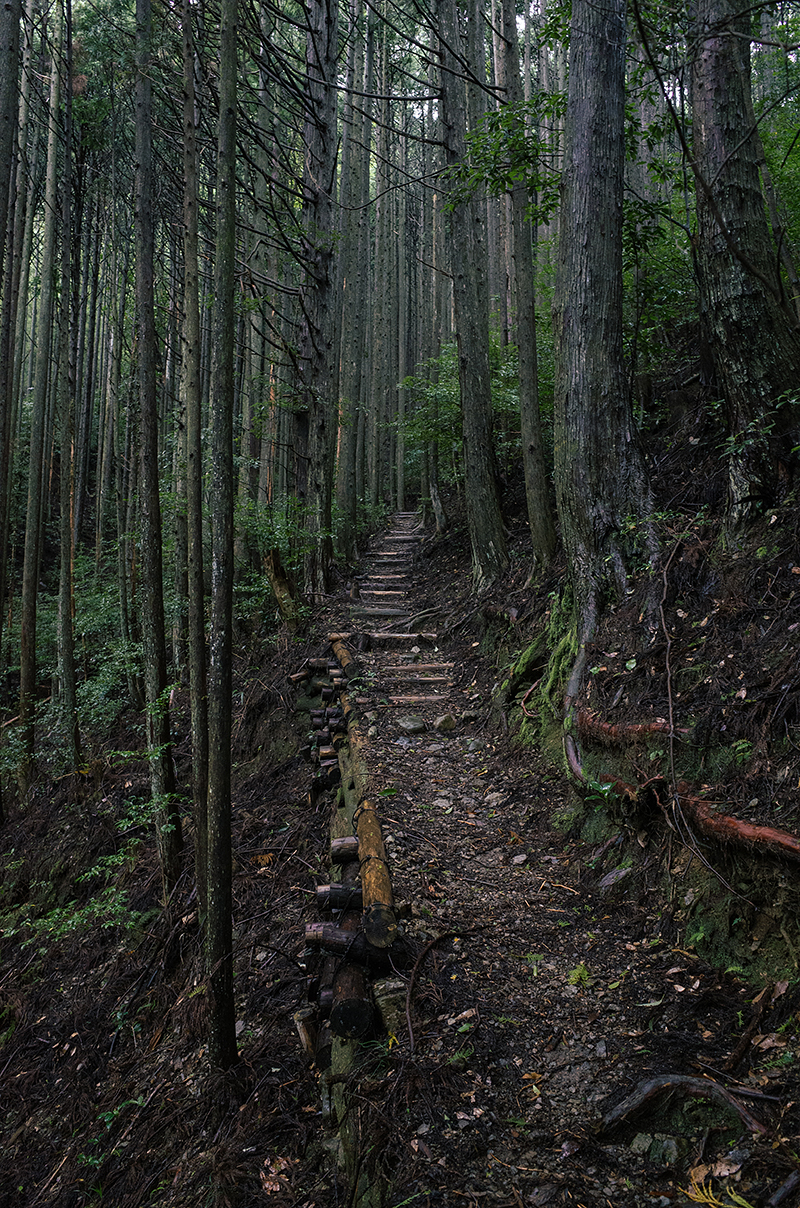
The Kumano Kodō near Tsugizakura-oji.

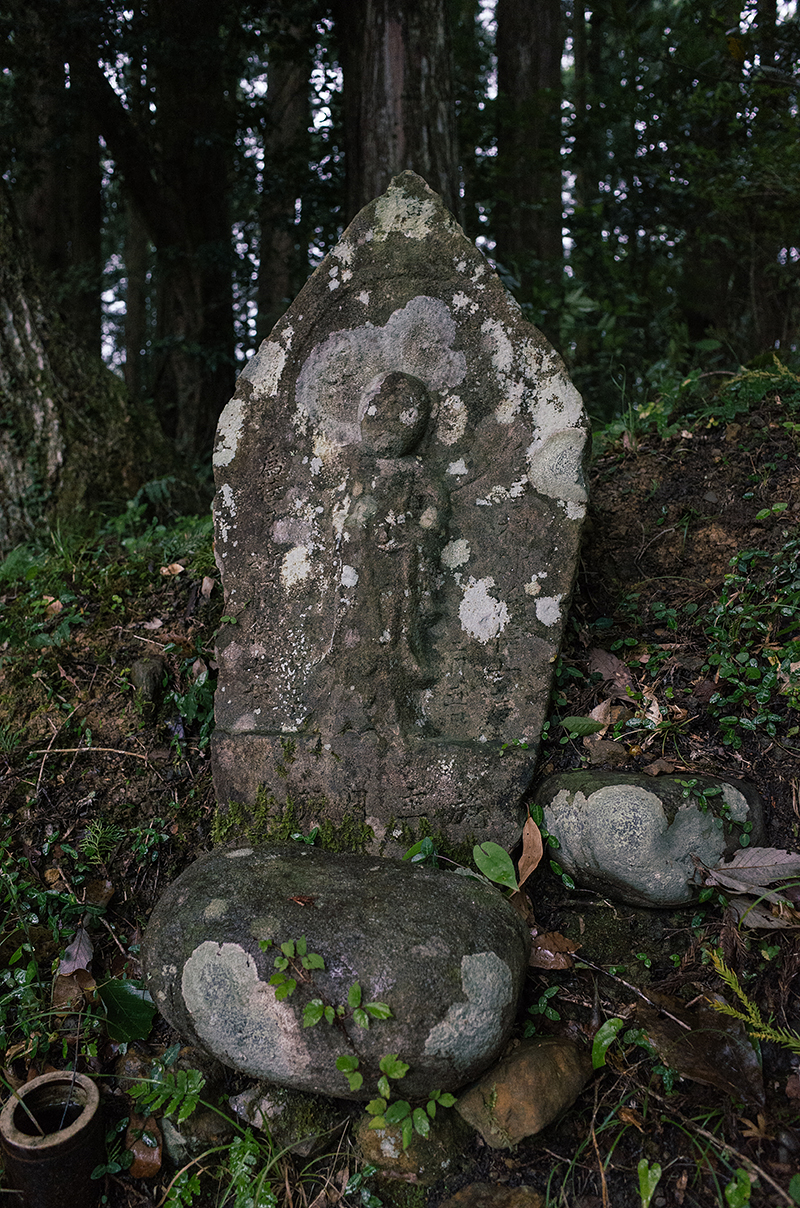
A religious monument near Hisohara-oji.

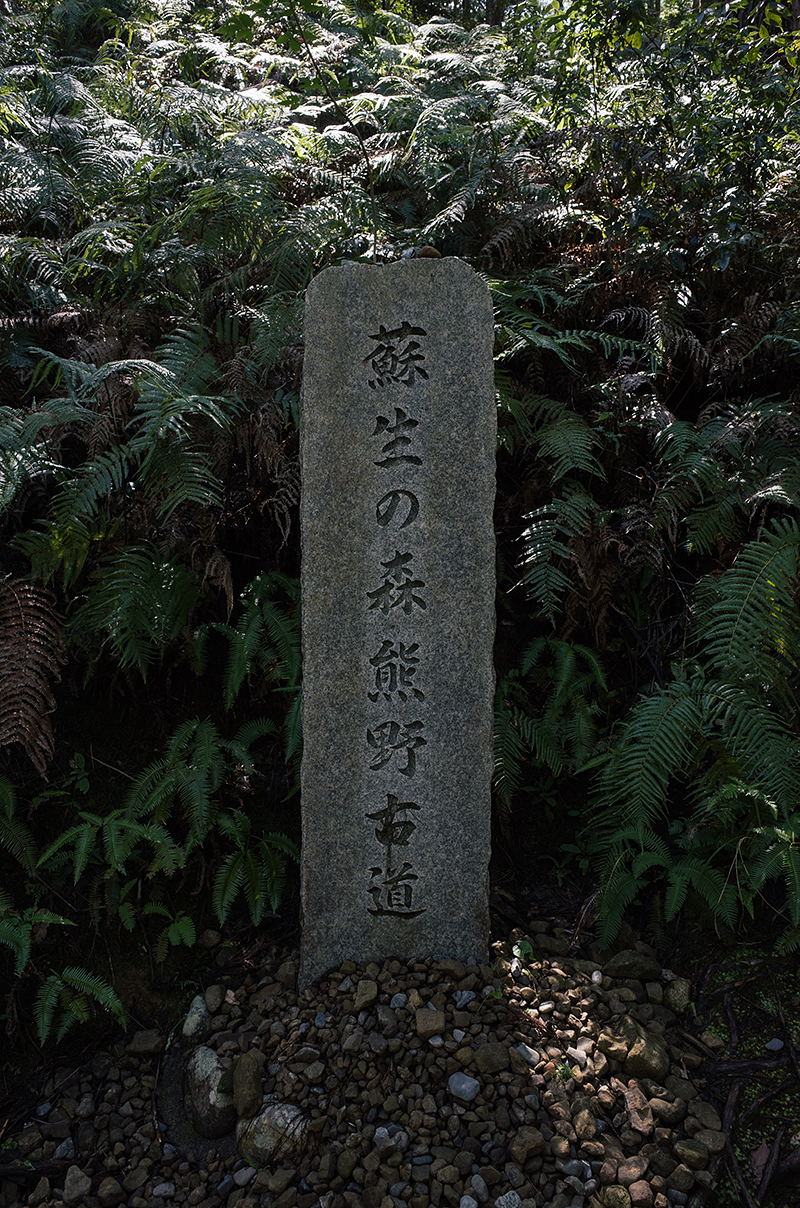
An old milestone for 1 ri — around 4 km, on the Kumano Kodō.

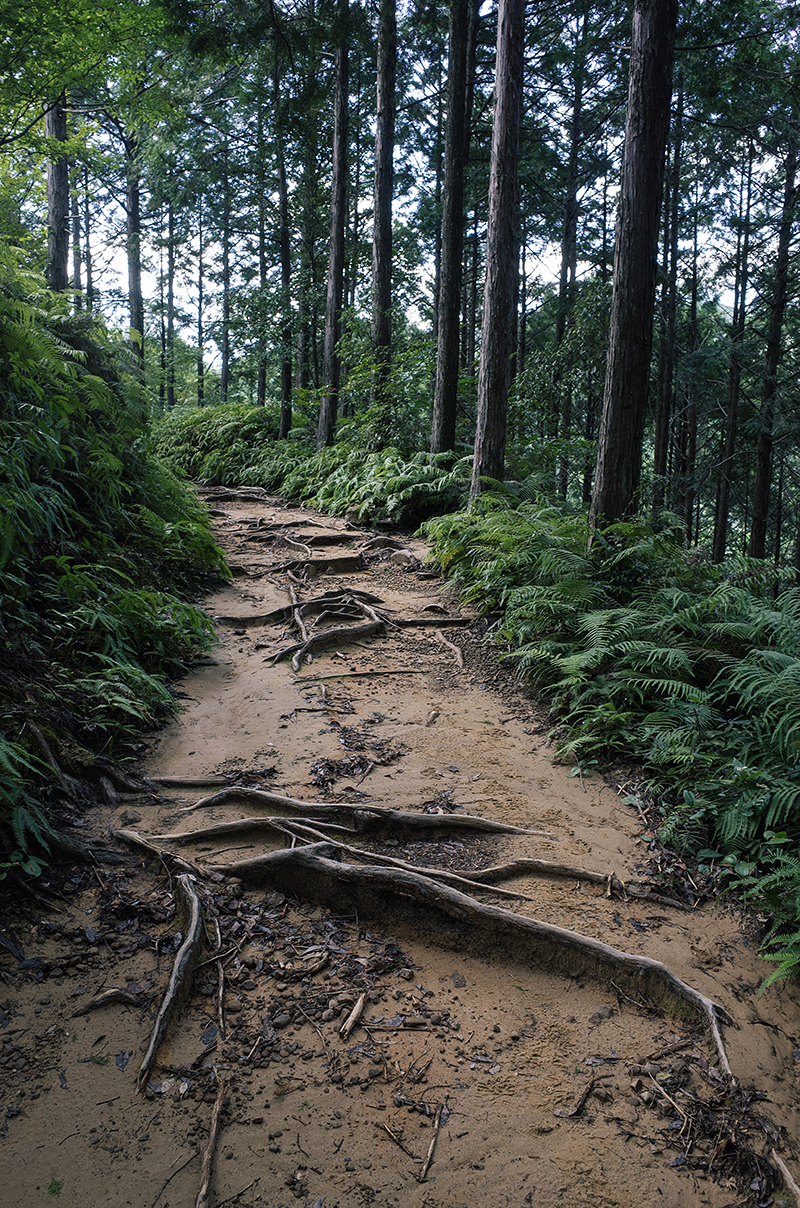
The route near the Kumano Hongū Taisha.

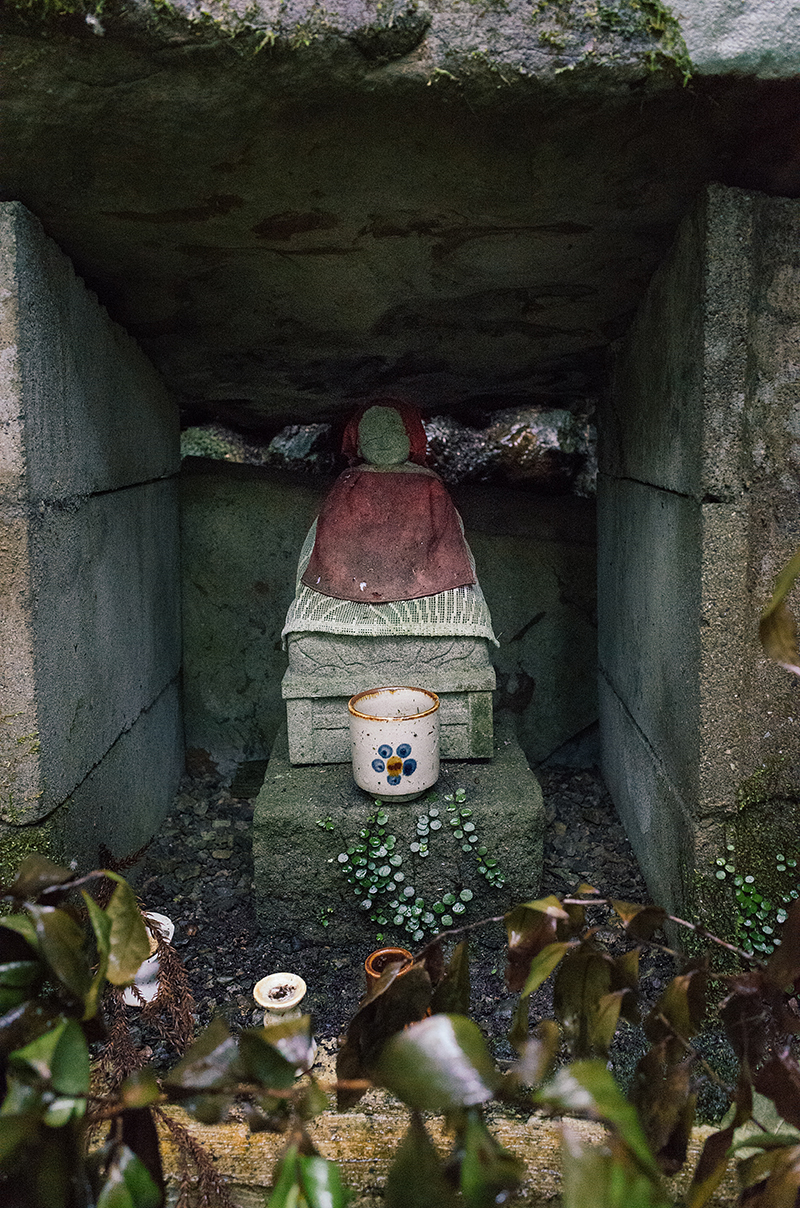
A jizo figure inside the small shrine at Inohana-oji.

== See also ==
- Japan 100 Kannon Pilgrimage
- Shikoku Pilgrimage
- Tourism in Japan
- The 100 Views of Nature in Kansai
- Shugendō
- Kumano shrine

== Bibliography ==
- Beumer, Hans (2016). Kumano Kodo Travel Guide.
