= Ōtani Kofun =

- 大谷古墳 (Japanese)
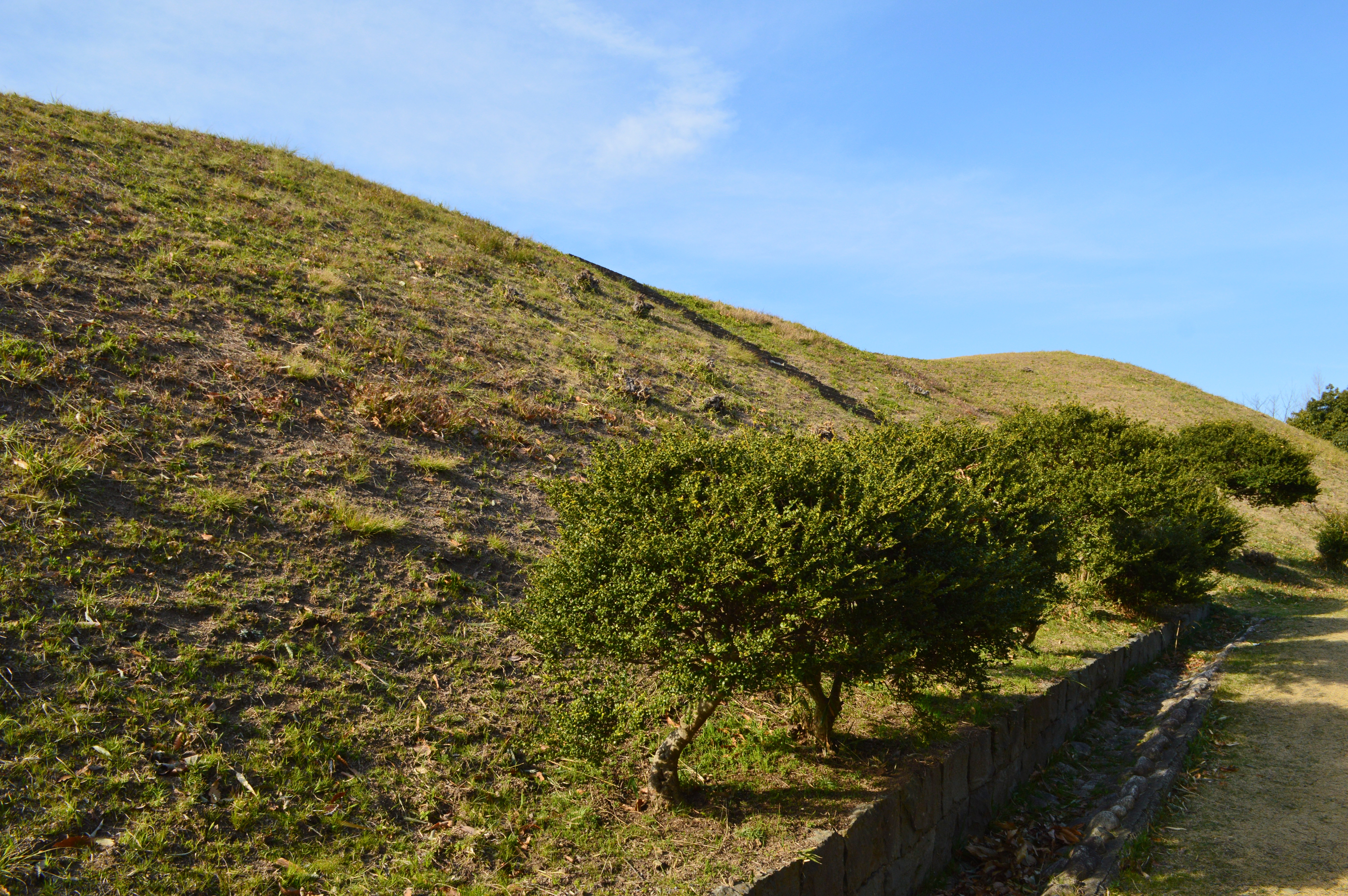
- Ōtani Kofun

- Ōtani Kofun Ōtani Kofun (Japan)
- 34°15′42.5″N 135°10′34.5″E
- Type: Kofun
- Periods: Kofun period
- Location: Wakayama (city), Wakayama Prefecture, Japan
- Region: Kansai region

History
- Built: late 5th- early 6th century AD

Site notes
- Public access: Yes

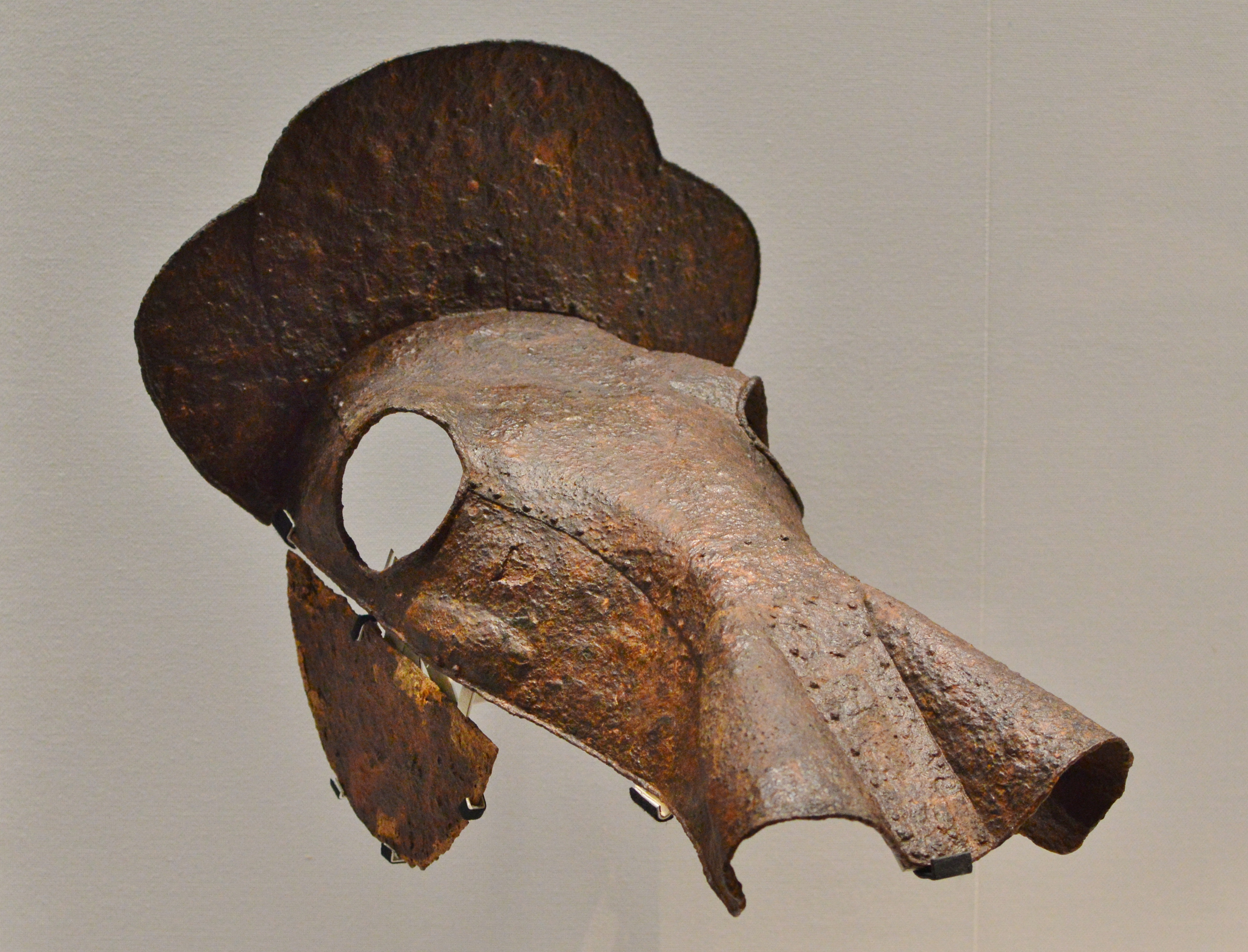
Reproduction of horse helm found at the Ōtani Kofun

The Ōtani Kofun (大谷古墳) is a kofun burial mound located in the city of Wakayama, Wakayama Prefecture, in the Kansai region of Japan. The tumulus was designated a National Historic Site in 1978. The artifacts excavated from the tumulus were designated as National Important Cultural Properties in 1982.

== Overview ==
The Ōtani Kofun is located on the north bank of the Kinokawa River estuary, at the southern foot of the Izumi Mountains, with its front facing southwest. An archaeological excavation was conducted by Kyoto University from 1957 to 1958. It is a zenpō-kōen-fun (前方後円墳), which is shaped like a keyhole, having one square end and one circular end, when viewed from above. It has a total length of 67 meters, with a row of 39 cylindrical haniwa excavated in situ from the rim of the posterior circular portion (seven are known to have been removed at an earlier date).

Within the burial chamber located in the posterior circular portion was a house-shaped sarcophagus made of tuff from Mount Aso in Kyushu, The sarcophagus is made up of a bottom stone, four side stones, and two connecting lid stones. The lid stone measures 2.96 x 1.6 meters and has six annular protrusions for ropes on both sides. Within were the bones a male aged between 20 and 30 years, presumed to be a military commander of the ancient Kii kingdom. From the grave goods found within the tomb, it was constructed between the late 5th and early 6th centuries, so it is presumed that it is a tomb from the same Kii Kuni no miyatsuko clan as the nearby Iwase-Senzuka Kofun Cluster, although the exact relationship between these sites is uncertain.

The grave goods included a set of small bronze mirrors, with diameters of 26, 31 and 34 mm, 21 translucent green glass magatama, and other jewelry, iron agricultural implements, an iron sword and helmet. However, the most valuable object was a set of horse armor, including a horse helmet, consisting of cheek pads, a semi-cylindrical shaffron and several iron plates. It is the only complete example which has been excavated in Japan, although a partial example was found at the Shogunyama Kofun in Saitama Prefecture and more than ten examples have been found on the Korean Peninsula. Identical armor is showing a mural in the Tomb of the General, a Goguryeo royal tomb located in what is now Ji'an, Jilin province, China. All of the grave goods indicate a pronounced relationship with continental culture. The excavated relics are on display at the Wakayama City Museum.

The tumulus is about a 15-minute walk from Kinokawa Station on the Nankai Main Line.

Overall length
67 meters
Posterior circular portion
30 meter diameter x 9.5 meters high
Anterior rectangular portion
48 meters wide x 9 meters high

== See also ==
- List of Historic Sites of Japan (Wakayama)
