= Shikagō Ichirizuka =

Japanese distance marker

Shikagō ichirizuka
- 四箇郷一里塚 (Japanese)
- Shikagō ichirizuka Shikagō Ichirizuka (Japan)
- 35°14′42″N 135°12′03″E
- Type: ichirizuka
- Periods: Edo period
- Location: Wakayama, Wakayama, Japan
- Region: Kansai region

Site notes
- Public access: Yes

The Shikagō ichirizuka (四箇郷一里塚) is a historic Japanese distance marker akin to a milestone, comprising a pair of earthen mounds located in what is now the Shinzaike neighborhood of the city of Wakayama, Wakayama Prefecture, in the Kansai region of Japan. It was designated a National Historic Site of Japan in 1940.

== Overview ==
During the Edo period Tokugawa shogunate established ichirizuka on major roads, enabling calculation both of distance travelled and of the charge for transportation by kago or palanquin. These mounds, denoted the distance in ri (3.927 kilometres (2.440 mi)) to Nihonbashi, the "Bridge of Japan", erected in Edo in 1603. Since the Meiji period, most of the ichirizuka have disappeared, having been destroyed by then elements, modern highway construction and urban encroachment. In 1876, the "Ichirizuka Abolition" decree was issued by the Meiji government and many were demolished at that time. Currently, 17 surviving ichirizuka are designated as national historic sites.

The Shikagō ishirizuka was not located on one of the major historic highways, bu was built one ri from Kyobashi over the outer moat of Wakayama Castle (currently the Ichihori River). In 1615 when Tokugawa Yorinobu became daimyō of Kishū Domain, he rebuilt Wakayama Castle and the surrounding castle town. The main road which he would use for making his sankin kōtai processions to the Shogun's court in Edo was lined with pine trees on either side for some distance from the castle, and at the one ri point, these ishirizuka were built. When he and his successors travelled to Edo, it was up to this point that the various domains officials who would be remaining behind in Wakayama would accompany him, and when he returned to Wakayama from Edo, it was at this point that the officials would assemble to greet him on his safe return.

An archaeological excavation was conducted in 1981 which determined that the size of the ichirizuka is about 50 square meters in base area and 2.7 meters in height on the north side, and about 40 square meters and 1.8 meters high on the south side.

The Shikagō ichirizuka is a 15-minute walk from Kii-Nakanoshima Station on the JR West Hanwa Line.

== See also ==
- List of Historic Sites of Japan (Wakayama)
