= Shimosato Kofun =

- 下里古墳 (Japanese)
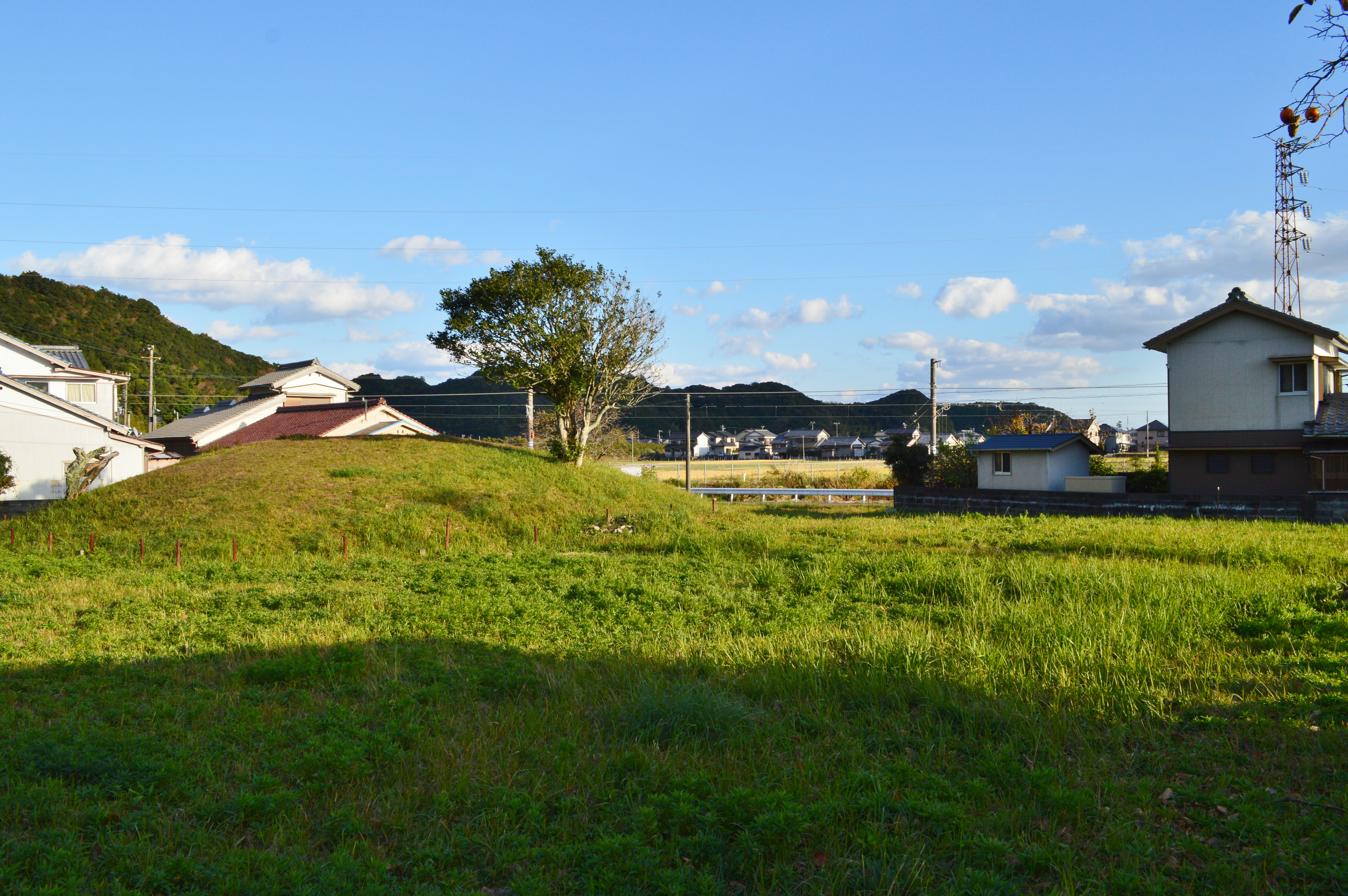
- Shimosato Kofun

- Shimosato Kofun Shimosato Kofun (Japan)
- 33°35′3.18″N 135°55′21.76″E
- Type: Kofun
- Periods: Kofun period
- Location: Nachikatsuura, Wakayama, Japan
- Region: Kansai region

History
- Built: end 4th century AD

Site notes
- Public access: Yes (no public facilities)

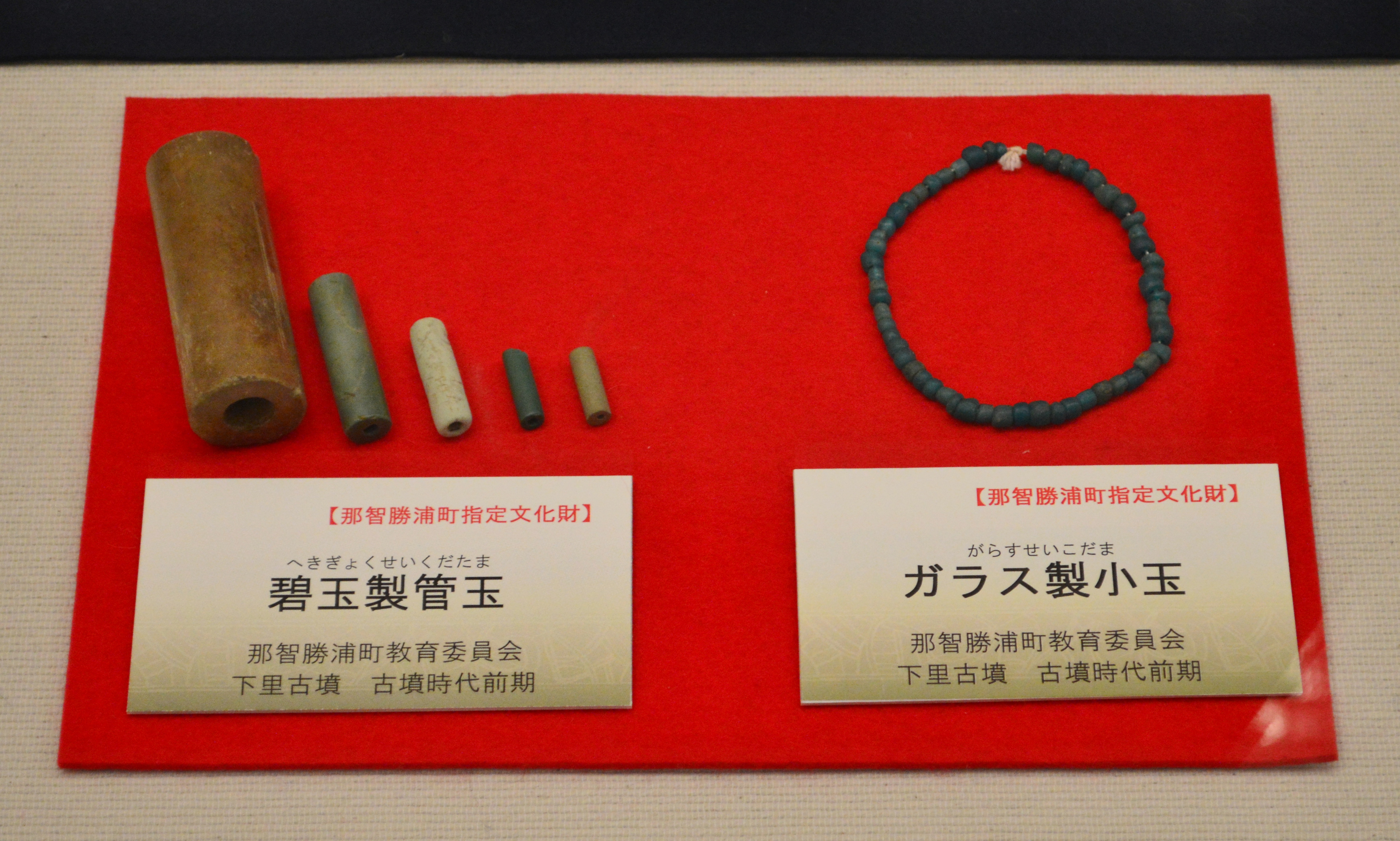
Grave Goods from Shimosato Kofun

The Shimosato Kofun (下里古墳) is a Kofun period burial mound located between the Shimosato neighborhood of the town of Nachikatsuura, Higashimuro District Wakayama Prefecture in the Kansai region of Japan. The tumulus was designated a National Historic Site of Japan in 1976. and the items excavated from the tomb are designated Tangible Cultural Properties of Nachikatsuura Town.

== Overview ==
The Shimosato Kofun is located on the left bank of the mouth of the Ota River in the southernmost part of the Kii Peninsula. It is a zenpō-kōen-fun (前方後円墳), which is shaped like a keyhole, having one square end and one circular end, when viewed from above. The tumulus is orientated from east to west, with the anterior portion facing west. The anterior portion was also flattened sometime in the Heian period when a Shinto shrine was constructed on the tumulus. The tumulus was built without stages.

Fukiishi have been found on the surface, but there is no trace of haniwa. The tumulus has traces of a moat with a width of five meters, but it is uncertain if this extended completely around the mound. The burial chamber is a pit-type stone chamber parallel to the main axis of the mound. It is 5.35 meters in length, but is in poor condition, with the ceiling and much of the north wall destroyed.

The tumulus was first excavated in 1929 by local villagers, who appear to have destroyed the wooden sarcophagus and to have looted most of the grave goods. Some remaining grave goods were found in an academic excavation in 1974, leading to the National Historic Site designation in 1976. A second excavation was conducted in 2000 and a third excavation in 2005.

Artifacts recovered (and preserved) include 56 glass beads, one iron sword and fragments of two more swords, one large jadeite ball and six jadeite tubes and pottery shards of Jomon and Yayoi pottery, some of which appear to have been imported from, or influenced by, the Tōkai region. However, some pottery shards from the Heian period into the Muromachi period have also been found, indicating that this site may have been contaminated in pre-modern times.

Photographs of an exhibition of grave goods after 1929 indicate that a number of bronze mirrors were recovered at that time, but the whereabouts of these artifacts is now unknown.The tumulus has a total length of 40 meters and is believed to date from the end of the 4th century and the beginning of the 5th century (mid-Kofun period). Although small in size, it is significant from its location at the southernmost tip of Honshu, and is presumed to have been connected with the ancient Kuni no miyatsuko of Kii Province.

The tumulus is located about a five-minute walk from Shimosato Station on the JR West Kisei Line.

Overall length
40 meters
Posterior circular portion
21.5 meter diameter x 2.5 meters high

== See also ==
- List of Historic Sites of Japan (Wakayama)
