= Kōzanji Shell Mound =

Kōzanji Shell Midden
- 高山寺貝塚 (Japanese)
- Kōzanji Shell Midden Kōzanji Shell Mound (Japan)
- 33°44′24″N 135°22′42″E
- Type: shell midden
- Periods: Jōmon period
- Location: Tanabe, Wakayama, Japan
- Region: Kansai region

Site notes
- Area: .
- Public access: Yes

The Kōzanji Shell Midden (高山寺貝塚, Kōzanji kaizuka) is an archaeological site consisting of a shell midden and the remains of an adjacent Jōmon period settlement located in the Inari-cho neighborhood the city of Tanabe, Wakayama Prefecture in the Kansai region of Japan. The midden was designated a National Historic Site of Japan in 1970.

== Overview ==
During the early to middle Jōmon period (approximately 4000 to 2500 BC), sea levels were five to six meters higher than at present, and the ambient temperature was also 2 deg C higher. During this period, the Kansai region was inhabited by the Jōmon people, many of whom lived in coastal settlements. The middens associated with such settlements contain bone, botanical material, mollusc shells, sherds, lithics, and other artifacts and ecofacts associated with the now-vanished inhabitants, and these features, provide a useful source into the diets and habits of Jōmon society. Most of the shell middens are found along the Pacific coast of Japan.

The Kōzanji Shell Midden is located in the precincts of the Buddhist temple of Kōzan-ji on a hill with an elevation of 32 meters overlooking Tanabe Bay. The shell mound was discovered on the western slope of the temple grounds in the fall of 1938 during expansion work on a cemetery, and is a rare example of a shell midden in the Kansai region of Japan. The site consists of three separate shell middens in three locations on the slope of the hill. Archaeological excavations have found that the thickness of the midden is about one meter, and that it consists mainly of marine shellfish such as ark shells, oysters, and hamaguri clams. The Jōmon pottery found at this site has a distinct conical shape with a pointed bottom, and stamped pattern that mainly mixes ellipses and lattice patterns. This distinctive style has led to the Kōzanji Shell Midden to be designated a type site. Stone tools of various types have also been excavated. These artifacts are all dated to the early Jōmon period, or approximately 9,300 years ago.

The site is about ten minutes by car from Kii-Tanabe Station on the JR West Kisei Main Line.

== See also ==
- List of Historic Sites of Japan (Wakayama)
