= Isoma Rock Shelter Site =

Archaeological site in Tanabe, Wakayama, Japan

- 磯間岩陰遺跡 (Japanese)
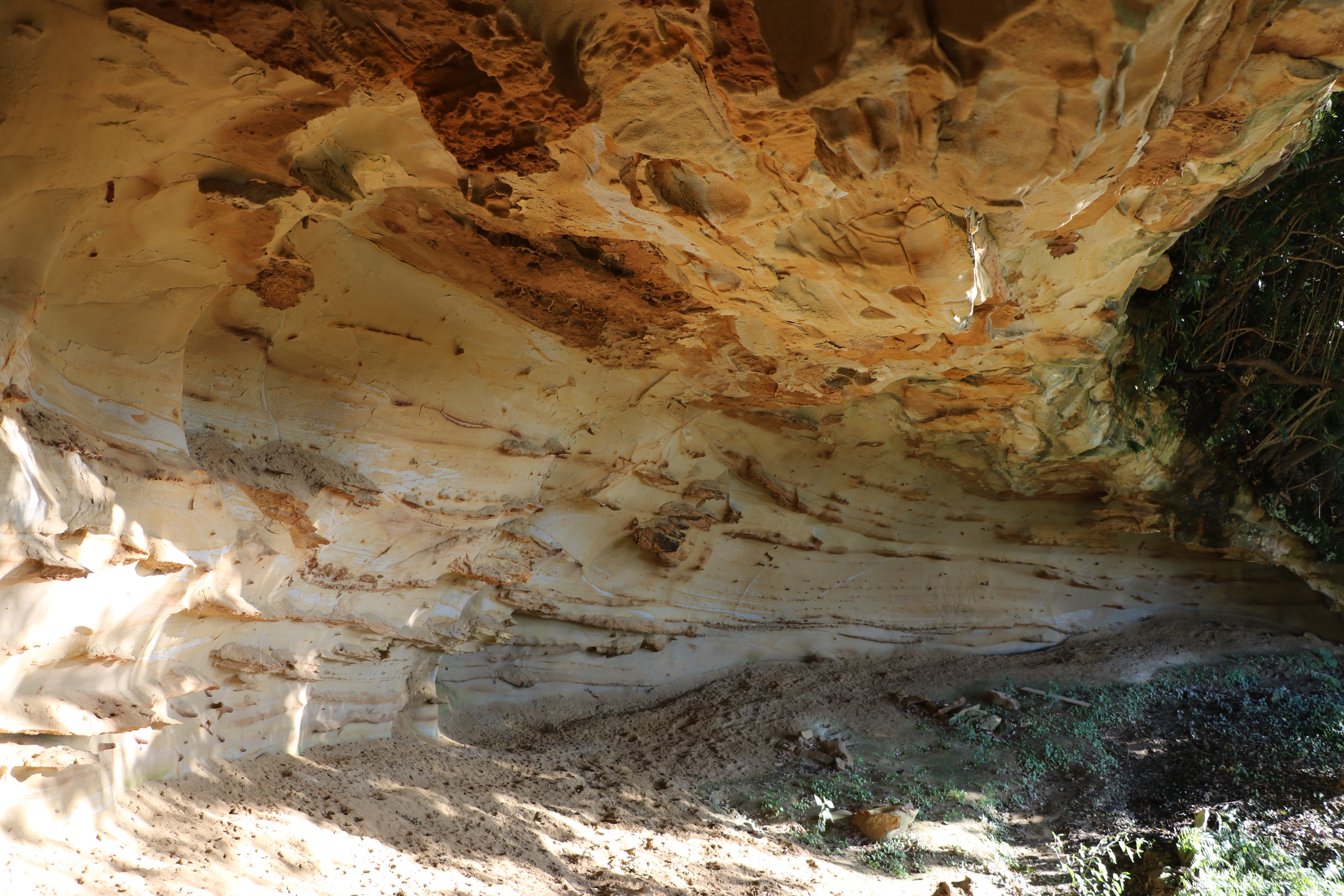
- Isoma Rock Shelter Site

- Isoma Rock Shelter Site Isoma Rock Shelter Site (Japan)
- 33°43′15.8″N 135°22′59.9″E
- Type: grave
- Periods: Kofun period
- Location: Tanabe, Wakayama Japan
- Region: Kansai region

History
- Built: 5th to 7th century AD

Site notes
- Excavation dates: 1969
- Public access: Yes (no facilities)

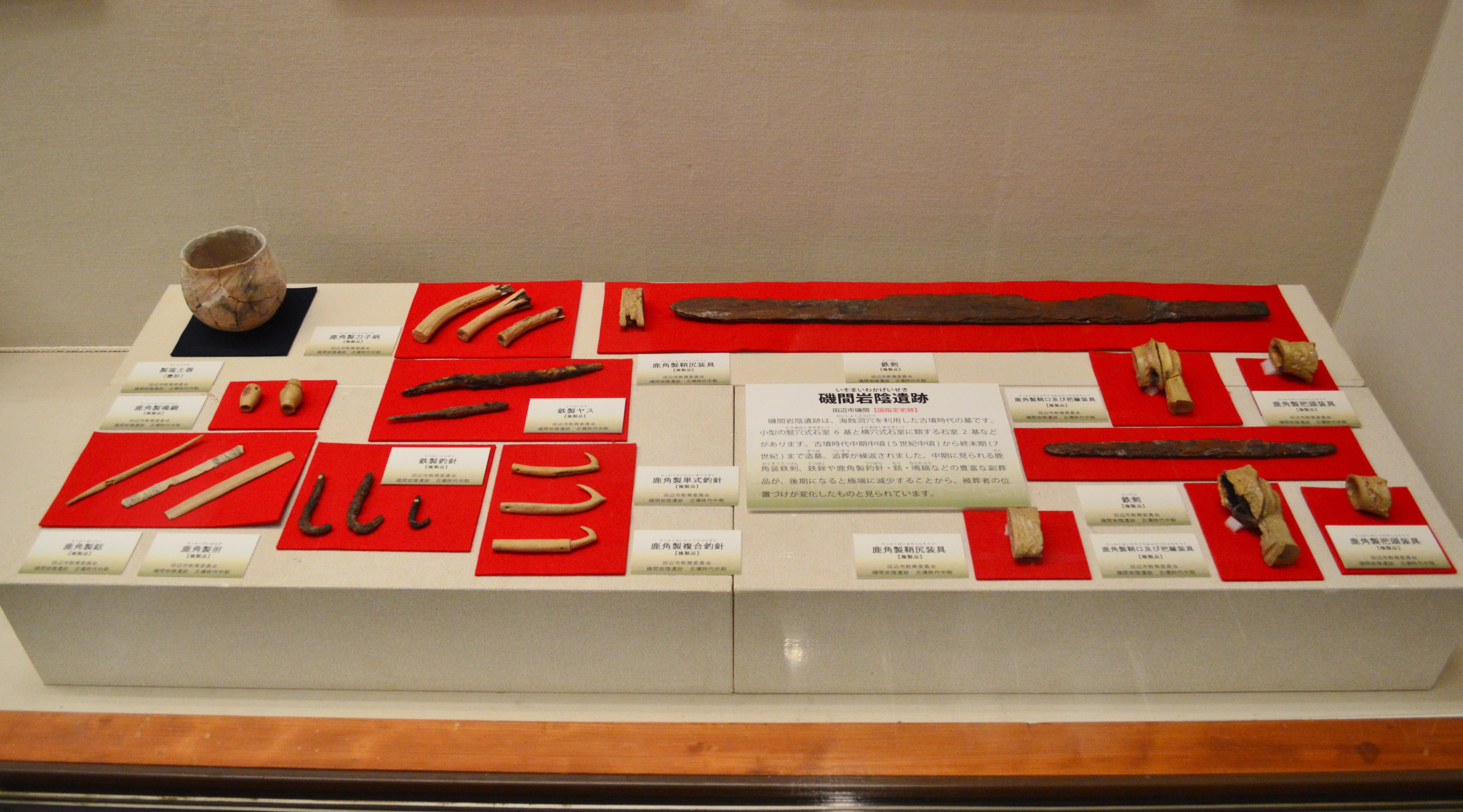
Recovered artifacts

.

The Isoma Rock Shelter Site (磯間岩陰遺跡, Isoma iwakage iseki) is an archaeological site with a Kofun period mass grave located in what is now the Minato neighborhood of city of Tanabe in Wakayama Prefecture in the Kansai region of Japan. It received protection as a National Historic Site in 1979.

== Overview ==
The site is located in the innermost part of Tanabe Bay facing the Kii Channel on the western shore of the Kii Peninsula. The area contains many sea caves caused by wave erosion, and the Isoma site is a rock shelter measuring about 23 meters wide by about 5 meters deep by 5 meters high on the west slope of a 20-meter hill made of soft sandstone. In 1969, a large amount of Sue ware pottery, antler products, and human bones, were excavated. The largest stone chamber contained the remains of an old man and an infant buried facing each other, and grave goods included many fishing implements, including fishing hooks and a harpoon and an iron sword. These remains were covered with the accumulation of fine sand due to the wind erosion of the rock shelter, but there was no evidence that there was a seal on the stone burial chamber, and the remains were originally exposed within the rock shelter. Within the shelter were a total of eight stone burial chambers with an estimated 13 human remains, and it is believed that they were used from the end of the 5th century to the first half of the 7th century AD, based on the contents of the grave goods.

Recovered artifacts are exhibited at the Tanabe City Museum of History and Folklore. These were collectively designated a National Important Cultural Property in 1988.

The site is about 10 minutes by car from Kii-Tanabe Station on the JR West Kisei Main Line.

== See also ==
- List of Historic Sites of Japan (Wakayama)
