= Misuji temple ruins =

Hakuhō period Buddhist temple

- 三栖廃寺 (Japanese)
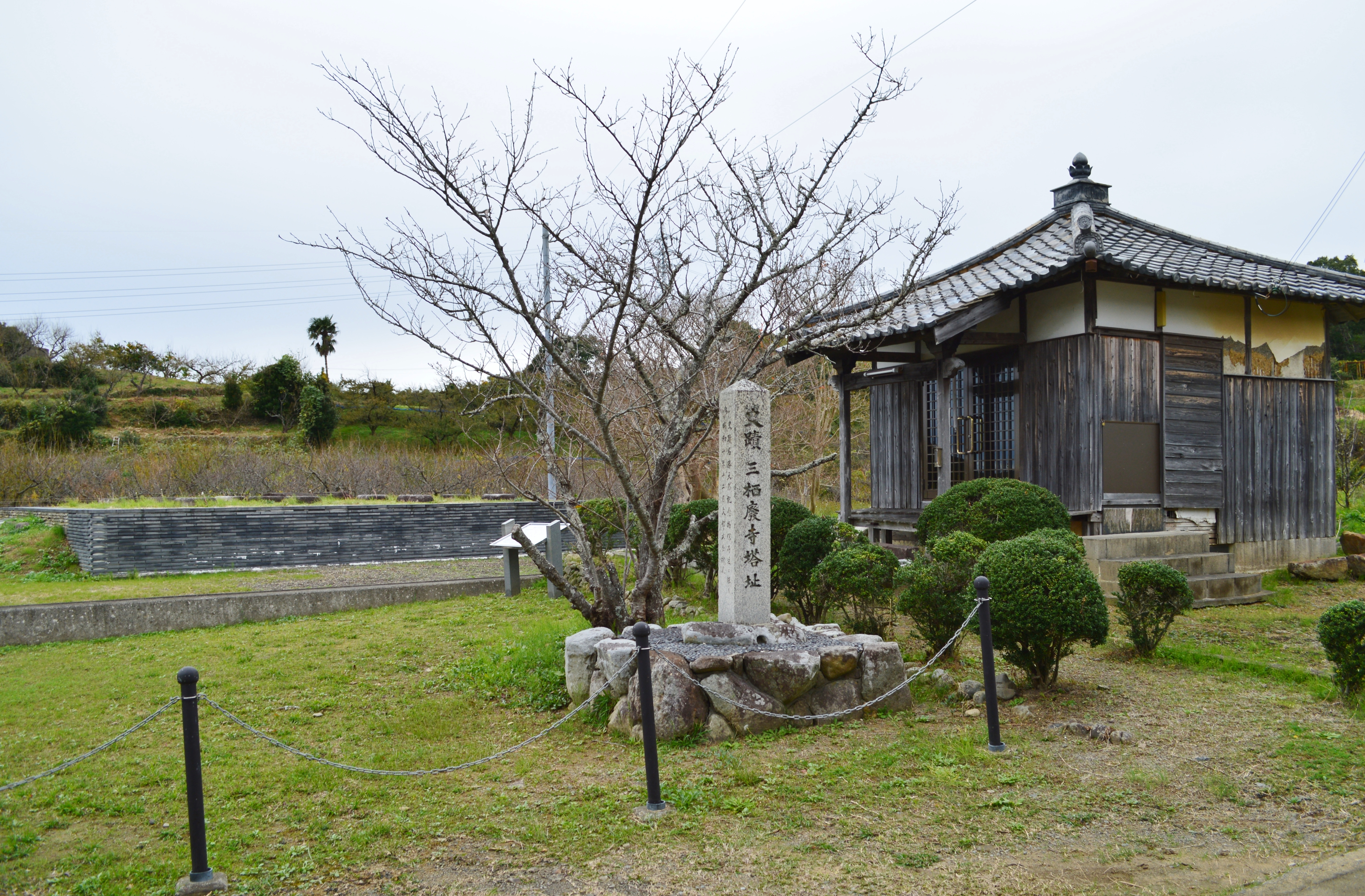
- Misuji temple ruins

- Misu temple ruins Misuji temple ruins (Japan)
- 33°44′14″N 135°25′00″E
- Type: temple ruins
- Periods: Hakuho period
- Location: Tanabe, Wakayama, Japan
- Region: Kansai region

History
- Built: 7th century AD

Site notes
- Public access: Yes (archaeological park)

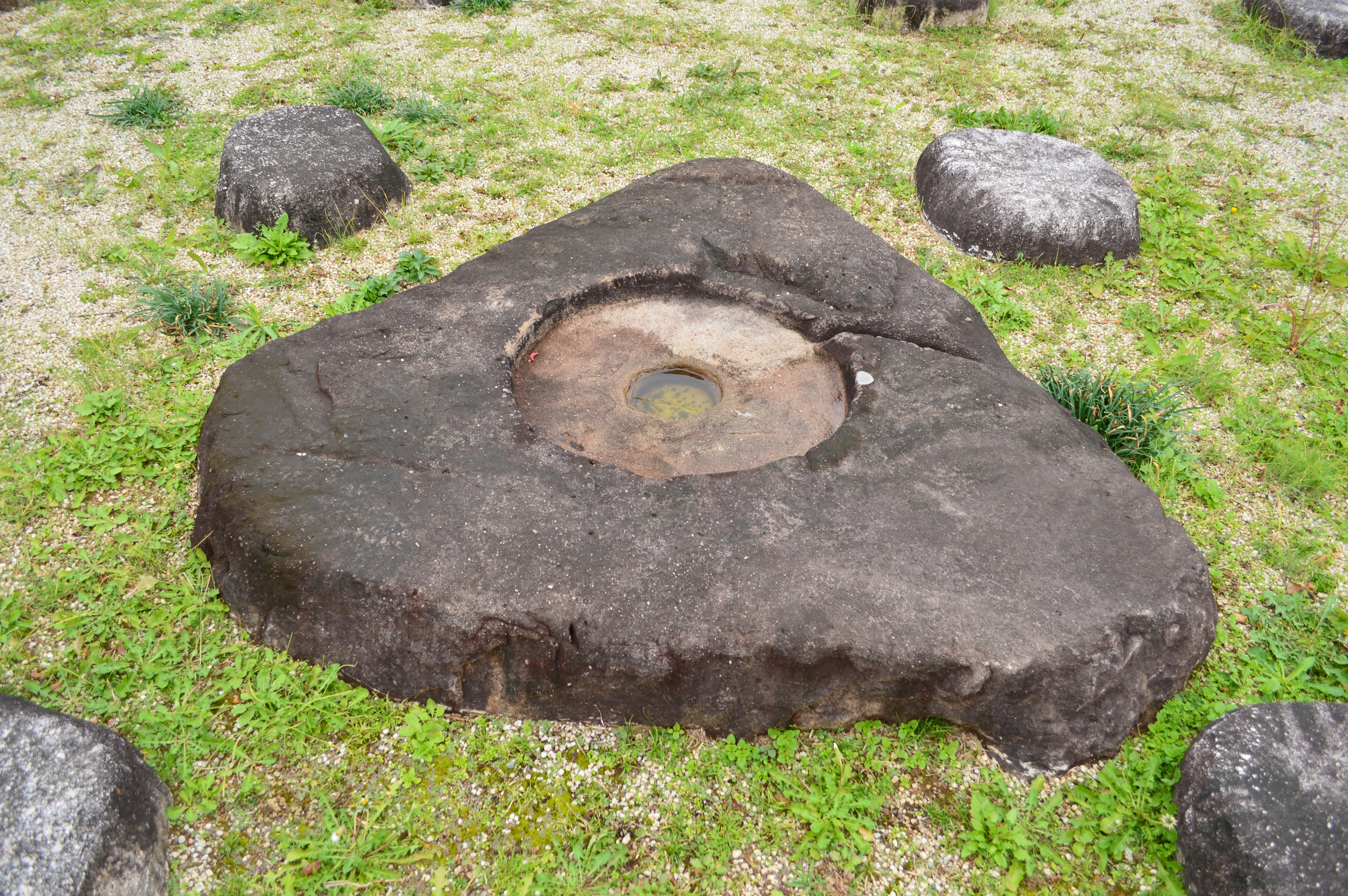
Foundations of pagoda

The Misuji temple ruins (三栖廃寺塔跡, Misu Haiji ato), is an archaeological site with the ruins of a late Hakuhō period Buddhist temple located in the Shimomisu neighborhood of the city of Tanabe, Wakayama, Japan. The temple no longer exists, but the temple grounds were designated as a National Historic Site in 1935, with the area under protection expanded in 1985.

== Overview ==
The Misuji temple ruins are the southernmost known temple ruins in the Kansai region and are believed to have been the official temple for ancient Muro County. The site is located at the southern foot of Mt. Kinugasa on the right bank of the Hidariaizu River in the southern part of Wakayama Prefecture. During the Hakuhō period, this area was the boundary between the “Kinai culture” of the Yamato Basin and the “Kumano culture” of the southern Kii Peninsula.

The general layout of the temple appears to have been patterned after Hōryū-ji in Ikaruga, Nara, with the Main Hall in the east and a Pagoda in the west, with the monk's quarters located to the north. Historical records of this temple are very scant. The first archaeological excavation was conducted in 1930, with subsequent excavations conducted in 1969, and from 1978 to 1982.

Only the site of the pagoda is covered under the National Historic Site designation. This consists of triangular-shaped sandstone blocks, approximately 1.9 meters on each side, with a concave seat in the center which once supported the central column of the pagoda. There are three steps of natural stones in the center of the front on the south side, which presumably led to the entrance, and from the size of the core foundation, it is estimated that the pagoda was a three-story structure. A large quantity of roof tile shards, including circular eaves tiles and flat tiles have been found in the vicinity. These tiles date variously to the Hakuho, Nara and Heian periods.

The foundation of the Main Hall is uncertain, but the foundations of the monk's quarters have been located 30 meters northeast of the pagoda foundation. This building measured 15 meters east-to-west by nine meters north-to-south.

In addition, the remnants of a moat with a width of about 1.4 meters and depth of 0.45 meters has been found on the western edge of the site.

The ruins are open to the public as an archaeological park and are located about ten minutes by car from Kii-Tanabe Station on the JR West Kisei Main Line.

== See also ==
- List of Historic Sites of Japan (Wakayama)
