= Suiken Embankment =

Suiken Embantment
- 水軒堤防 (Japanese)
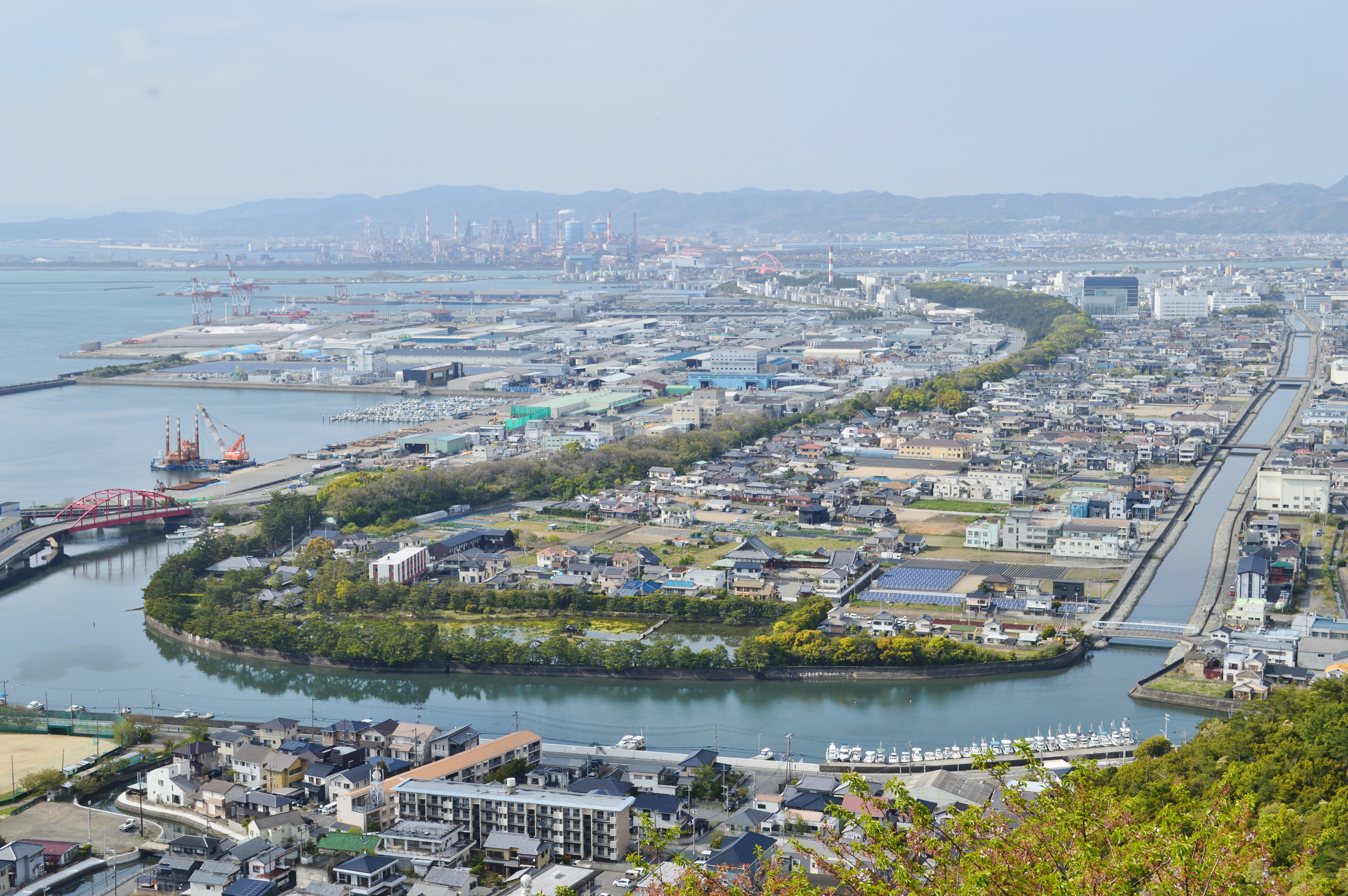
- Suiken Embantment viewed from Mount Takozushi

- Suiken Embantment Suiken Embankment (Japan)
- 34°12′13″N 135°09′14″E
- Periods: Edo period
- Location: Wakayama (city), Wakayama Prefecture, Japan
- Region: Kansai region

The Suiken Embantment (水軒堤防, Suiken teibō) is an Edo period levee located in the Nishihama neighborhood of the city of Wakayama, Wakayama Prefecture, in the Kansai region of Japan. The site was designated a National Historic Site of Japan in 2019.

== Overview ==
The Suiken Levee is located on the south bank of the mouth of the Kinokawa River, which flows through the northern part of Wakayama Prefecture. It forms a seawall and breakwater and extends for 2.6 kilometers, of which approximately 1.5 kilometers are covered by the National Historic Site designation. The levee consists of three portions. The middle portion (approximately 960 meters) consists of a stone embankment with a trapezoidal cross section, a clay embankment behind it, and stone paving in front. The stones are ashlars of local Izumi sandstone. The double structure of the stone embankment and the earthen embankment was designed to be able to withstand the load caused by waves, The southern portion consists only of an earthen embankment, and is approximately 280 meters long, and the northern portion is largely a natural levee, with a length of approximately 1370 meters. The levee had a height of between 3.7 and 4.4 meters and a width of 27 meters or more.

There are few historical records pertaining to the construction of this levee, and it has long been attributed to Asahina Danzaemon, a retainer of Kishu Domain in the early 17th century. However, archaeological excavations from 2004 to 2009 have found that it was constructed around the latter half of the 18th century.

Much of the levee is buried under sand which has accumulated over time A part of the excavated portion has been preserved at the Suiken Park, near Suiken Station on the Nankai Electric Railway Wakayamako Line.

== See also ==
- List of Historic Sites of Japan (Wakayama)
