= List of cultural properties of Japan – historical materials (Wakayama) =

This list is of the cultural properties of Japan designated in the category of historical materials (歴史資料, rekishi shiryō) for the Prefecture of Wakayama.

== National Cultural Properties ==
As of 1 February 2015, three Important Cultural Properties have been designated, being of national significance.

Property	Date	Municipality	Ownership	Comments	Image	Coordinates	Ref.
Kōya Edition Woodblocks 高野版板木; Kōya-ban hangi	Kamakura period	Kōya	Kongōsanmai-in (金剛三昧院)	486 items		34°12′37″N 135°35′13″E	
Kōya Edition Woodblocks 高野版板木; Kōya-ban hangi	Kamakura period	Kōya	Kongōbu-ji	5,488 items		34°12′51″N 135°35′03″E	
Kōya Masu 高野枡〈応永三年八月 日／高野山沙汰人連署刻銘〉 Kōya masu (Ōei sannen hachigatsu hi Kōyasan satanin rensho koku mei)	1396	Katsuragi	Kashiwagi District			34°18′41″N 135°29′42″E	

== Prefectural Cultural Properties ==
As of 1 February 2014, three properties have been designated at a prefectural level.

Property	Date	Municipality	Ownership	Comments	Image	Coordinates	Ref.
Old Diagram of the Negoro-ji Garan, light colour on paper 紙本淡彩根来寺伽藍古絵図 shihon tansai Negoroji garan koezu	mid-Edo period	Iwade	Negoro-ji			34°17′14″N 135°19′00″E	
Original Niu-Daimyōjin Shrine Mahaprajnaparamita Sutra 元丹生大明神社大般若波羅蜜多経; Moto Niu-Daimyōjin-sha Daihannyaharamitta-kyō	Heian to Edo period	Aridagawa	Kannonji, Higashiōtani District, Anrakuji	598 scrolls		34°04′19″N 135°20′56″E	
Modern Whaling Guns 近代捕鯨銃砲 kindai hogei jūhō	Meiji to Shōwa period	Taiji	Taiji Whale Museum (くじらの博物館)	22 items		33°36′07″N 135°56′45″E	

== See also ==
- Cultural Properties of Japan
- List of National Treasures of Japan (historical materials)
- List of Historic Sites of Japan (Wakayama)
