= List of historic sites of Japan (Wakayama) =

This list is of the historic sites of Japan located within the Prefecture of Wakayama.

== National Historic Sites ==
As of 17 June 2022, thirty-one Sites have been designated as being of national significance (including one *Special Historic Site); Kumano Sanzan spans the prefectural borders with Mie, Ōmine Okugakemichi spans the prefectural borders with Nara, and Kumano Sankeimichi spans the prefectural borders with both Mie and Nara.

| Site | Municipality | Comments | Image | Coordinates | Type | Ref. |
|---|---|---|---|---|---|---|
| *Iwasesenzuka Kofun Cluster 岩橋千塚古墳群; Iwasesenzuka kofun-gun | Wakayama | Kofun period tumuli cluster | | 34°13′31″N 135°13′35″E | 1 | |
| Isoma Rock Shelter Site 磯間岩陰遺跡; Isoma iwakage iseki | Tanabe | Kofun period grave site | | 33°43′17″N 135°23′00″E | 1 | |
| Shimosato Kofun 下里古墳; Shimosato kofun | Nachikatsuura | Kofun period tumulus | | 33°35′03″N 135°55′22″E | 1 | |
| Kii Kokubun-ji ruins 紀伊国分寺跡; Kii Kokubunji ato | Kinokawa | Nara period provincial temple of Kii Province | | 34°16′08″N 135°20′22″E | 3 | |
| Former Nate-juku Honjin 旧名手宿本陣; Kyū-Nate-juku honjin | Kinokawa | Edo Period Honjin | | 34°16′33″N 135°26′09″E | 6 | |
| Kongōbu-ji Precinct 金剛峯寺境内; Kongōbuji keidai | Kōya | head temple of Koyasan Shingon Buddhism with multiple National Treasures; inscribed on the UNESCO World Heritage List as one of the Sacred Sites and Pilgrimage Routes in the Kii Mountain Range | | 34°12′47″N 135°34′47″E | 3 | |
| Hiromura Embankment 広村堤防; Hiromura teibō | Hirogawa | Edo period seawall | | 34°01′35″N 135°10′14″E | 6 | |
| Kōzanji Shell Mound 高山寺貝塚; Kōzanji kaizuka | Tanabe | Jōmon period shell midden | | 33°44′24″N 135°22′42″E | 1 | |
| Kōyasan Chōishi 高野山町石; Kōyasan chōishi | Kōya, Katsuragi, Kudoyama | inscribed on the UNESCO World Heritage List as one of the Sacred Sites and Pilgrimage Routes in the Kii Mountain Range | | 34°13′34″N 135°32′16″E | 3, 6 | |
| Negoro-ji Precinct 根来寺境内; Negoroji keidai | Iwade | noted Buddhist temple | | 34°17′15″N 135°19′04″E | 3 | |
| Misuji temple ruins Pagoda site 三栖廃寺塔跡; Misu Haiji tō ato | Tanabe | Asuka period temple ruins | | 33°44′14″N 135°25′00″E | 3 | |
| Shikagō Ichirizuka 四箇郷一里塚; Shikagō ichirizuka | Wakayama | Edo period road marker | | 34°14′42″N 135°12′03″E | 6 | |
| Ueno temple ruins Site 上野廃寺跡; Ueno Haiji ato | Wakayama | Asuka period temple ruins | | 34°16′29″N 135°15′15″E | 3 | |
| Shingū Castle ruins and Mizuno clan cemetery 新宮城跡附水野家墓所; Shingū-jō ato tsuketari Mizuno-ke bosho | Shingū | Edo Period castle and daimyō cemetery | | 33°43′05″N 135°59′08″E | 2, 7 | |
| Nishi Kokubun pagoda site 西国分塔跡; Nishi Kokubun tō ato | Iwade | Asuka period temple ruins | | 34°15′57″N 135°19′53″E | 3 | |
| Ōtani Kofun 大谷古墳; Ōtani kofun | Wakayama | Kofun period tumulus | | 34°15′42″N 135°10′35″E | 1 | |
| Niutsuhime Jinja Precinct 丹生都比売神社境内; Nyūtsuhime Jinja keidai | Katsuragi | inscribed on the UNESCO World Heritage List as one of the Sacred Sites and Pilgrimage Routes in the Kii Mountain Range | | 34°15′30″N 135°31′27″E | 3 | |
| Dōjō-ji Precinct 道成寺境内; Dōjōji keidai | Hidakagawa | noted Buddhist temple | | 33°54′52″N 135°10′28″E | 3 | |
| Hamaguchi Goryō grave 浜口梧陵墓; Hamaguchi Goryō no haka | Hirogawa | Bakumatsu period local administrator | | 34°01′16″N 135°10′05″E | 7 | |
| Myōe Kishū Cenotaphs 明恵紀州遺跡率都婆; Myōe Kishū iseki sotsu tōba | Arida, Yuasa, Aridagawa | relics associated with Kamakura period Buddhist monk | | 34°04′18″N 135°09′35″E | 3, 7 | |
| Narugami Shell Mound 鳴神貝塚; Narugami kaizuka | Wakayama | Jōmon period shell midden | | 34°13′50″N 135°12′42″E | 1 | |
| Wakayama Castle 和歌山城; Wakayama-jō | Wakayama | Edo period Castle | | 34°13′39″N 135°10′16″E | 2 | |
| Kishū Tokugawa clan cemetery 和歌山藩主徳川家墓所; Wakayama-han-shu Tokugawa-ke bosho | Kainan | Edo period daimyō cemetery at Chōhō-ji | | 34°06′32″N 135°10′01″E | 7 | |
| Kumano Sanzan 熊野三山; Kumano sanzan | Shingū, Tanabe, Nachikatsuura | designation includes an area of Kihō in Mie Prefecture | | 33°43′37″N 135°58′55″E | 3 | |
| Ōmine Okugakemichi 大峯奥駈道; Ōmine okugakemichi | Tanabe, Shingū | trail inscribed on the UNESCO World Heritage List as one of the Sacred Sites and Pilgrimage Routes in the Kii Mountain Range; designation includes areas of Yoshino, Kurotaki, Kawakami, Tenkawa, Kamikitayama, Shimokitayama, Totsukawa, and Gojō in Nara Prefecture | | 34°13′26″N 135°57′19″E | 3, 6 | |
| Kumano Sankeimichi 熊野参詣道; Kumano sankeimichi | Shingū, Tanabe, Nachikatsuura, Shirahama, Susami, Kōya | trails inscribed on the UNESCO World Heritage List among the Sacred Sites and Pilgrimage Routes in the Kii Mountain Range; designation includes the Nakahechi (中辺路), Ōhechi (大辺路), Kohechi (小辺路), Iseji (伊勢路), Kumano River (熊野川), Shichirimi-hama (七里御浜), and Hano-no-Iwa (花の窟) and areas of Nosegawa and Totsukawa in Nara Prefecture and Kumano, Owase, Taiki, Kihoku, Mihama, and Kihō in Mie Prefecture | | 33°54′06″N 135°48′11″E | 3, 6 | |
| Atagi Clan Fortified Residence Site 安宅氏城館跡; Atagi-shi jōkan ato | Shirahama | | | 33°34′45″N 135°27′52″E | 2 | |
| Suiken Embankment 水軒堤防; Suiken teibō | Wakayama | Edo period seawall | | 34°12′13″N 135°09′14″E | 6 | |
| Kashinosaki Lighthouse and Ertuğrul Shipwreck Site 樫野埼灯台及びエルトゥールル号遭難事件遺跡; Kashinosaki tōdai oyobi Erutūruru-gō sōnan jiken iseki | Kushimoto | early Meiji period lighthouse | | 33°28′13″N 135°51′39″E | 6, 9 | |
| Yuasa Fortified Residence Sites 湯浅党城館跡; Yuasa jōkan ato | Aridagawa, Yuasa | late Heian through Nanboku-chō period fortification ruins; designation includes the sites of Yuasa Castle (湯浅城跡) and Fujinami Fortified Residence (藤並館跡) | | 34°02′09″N 135°11′38″E | 2, 6, 9 | |
| Shingū Shimohonmachi Site 新宮下本町遺跡; Shingū Shimohonmachi iseki | Shingū | | | 33°43′51″N 135°59′21″E | | |

== Prefectural Historic Sites ==
As of 1 April 2022, one hundred and one Sites have been designated as being of prefectural importance.

| Site | Municipality | Comments | Image | Coordinates | Type | Ref. |
|---|---|---|---|---|---|---|
| Ohara Tōdō Grave 小原桃洞墓; Ohara Tōdō haka | Wakayama | at Daion-ji (大恩寺) | | 34°13′12″N 135°10′23″E | | for all refs see |
| Kanō Morohira Grave 加納諸平墓; Kanō Morohira haka | Wakayama | | | 34°13′48″N 135°09′51″E | | |
| Kawanabe Ōji Site 川辺王子跡; Kawanabe ōji ato | Wakayama | | | 34°16′06″N 135°15′12″E | | |
| Kamayama Kofun Cluster 釜山古墳群; Kamayama kofun-gun | Wakayama | | | 34°15′44″N 135°08′09″E | | |
| Okayama-no-Jishōdō Bell Tower 岡山の時鐘堂; Okayama no jishōdō | Wakayama | | | 34°13′32″N 135°10′21″E | | |
| Yamaguchi Haiji Site 山口廃寺跡; Yamaguchi Haiji ato | Wakayama | | | 34°16′31″N 135°16′12″E | | |
| Shakanokoshi Kofun 車駕之古址古墳; Shakanokoshi kofun | Wakayama | | | 34°15′45″N 135°08′03″E | | |
| Saikazaki Battery 雑賀崎台場; Saikazaki daiba | Wakayama | | | 34°11′37″N 135°08′24″E | | |
| Wakanoura 和歌の浦; Saikazaki daiba | Wakayama | designation includes Mount Tengu (奠供山), Tamamatsushima Jinja Precinct (玉津島神社境内地), Tenman Jinja Precinct (天満神社境内地), Tōshō-gū Precinct (東照宮境内地), Mount Imose and Sandan Bridge (妹背山と三断橋), Ashibeya-Asahiya Site and Mount Kagami (芦辺屋・朝日屋跡と鏡山), Mitaraiike Park (御手洗池公園), Shiogama Jinja Precinct (塩竃神社境内地), and Furobashi (不老橋); also a national Place of Scenic Beauty | | 34°11′12″N 135°10′22″E | | |
| Hirai No.1 Tumulus and Hirai Haniwa Kiln Sites 平井1号墳及び平井埴輪窯跡群; Hirai ichi-gō fun oyobi Hirai haniwa kama ato-gun | Wakayama | | | 34°15′46″N 135°10′14″E | | |
| Matsushiro Ōji Site 松代王子跡; Matsushiro ōji ato | Kainan | | | 34°09′19″N 135°13′27″E | | |
| Haraido Ōji Site 祓戸王子跡; Haraido ōji ato | Kainan | | | 34°08′52″N 135°12′54″E | | |
| Muroyama Kofun 室山古墳; Muroyama kofun | Kainan | | | 34°10′N 135°13′E | | |
| Tokorozaka Ōji Site 所阪王子跡; Tokorozaka ōji ato | Kainan | | | 34°07′28″N 135°11′45″E | | |
| Myōshū Shōnin Mausoleum 明秀上人廟所; Myōshū Shōnin byōsho | Kainan | | | 34°07′41″N 135°12′31″E | | |
| Mera Kofun 女良古墳; Mera kofun | Kainan | | | 34°07′51″N 135°08′46″E | | |
| Matsusaka Ōji Site 松坂王子跡; Matsusaka ōji ato | Kainan | | | 34°07′28″N 135°11′45″E | | |
| Kitsumoto Ōji Site 橘本王子跡; Kitsumoto ōji ato | Kainan | | | 34°07′42″N 135°11′42″E | | |
| Fukushō-ji Precinct (Kumano Sankeimichi Kiji) 福勝寺境内(熊野参詣道紀伊路); Fukushōji keidai (Kumano sankei-michi Kiiji) | Kainan | | | 34°07′44″N 135°11′35″E | | |
| Hanaoka Seishū Grave Stele 華岡青洲の墓碑; Hanaoka Seishū no bohi | Kinokawa | | | 34°16′57″N 135°26′27″E | | |
| Morita Sessai Grave Site 森田節斎翁墓地; Morita Sessai-ō no bochi | Kinokawa | | | 34°15′32″N 135°25′19″E | | |
| Maruyama Kofun 丸山古墳; Maruyama kofun | Kinokawa | | | 34°12′59″N 135°18′36″E | | |
| Toya Shinemon Grave Site 戸谷新右衛門の墓地; Toya Shinemon no bochi | Hashimoto | | | 34°19′N 135°35′E | | |
| Konono Haiji Pagoda Site 神野々廃寺塔跡; Konono haiji tō ato | Hashimoto | | | 34°18′28″N 135°34′42″E | | |
| Nagoso Haiji Site 名古曽廃寺跡; Nagoso haiji ato | Hashimoto | | | 34°18′39″N 135°33′54″E | | |
| Misasagiyama Kofun 陵山古墳; Misasagiyama kofun | Hashimoto | | | 34°19′14″N 135°36′47″E | | |
| Ōhata Saizō Katsuyoshi Grave 大畑才蔵勝善の墓; Ōhata Saizō Katsuyoshi no haka | Hashimoto | | | 34°17′N 135°35′E | | |
| Suda Hachiman Jinja Sutra Mound 隅田八幡神社経塚; Suda Hachiman Jinja kyōzuka | Hashimoto | | | 34°20′01″N 135°38′45″E | | |
| Nagoso Cremation Tombs 名古曽火葬墓; Nagoso kasōbo | Hashimoto | | | 34°18′46″N 135°34′00″E | | |
| Jōfuku-ji Precinct (Kōya Sankeimichi Kurokomichi) 定福寺境内(高野参詣道黒河道); Jōfukuji keidai (Kōya Sankei-michi Kuroko-michi) | Hashimoto | | | 34°18′32″N 135°36′46″E | | |
| Mediaeval Agricultural Water Supply Mongakuyu 中世農耕用水路文覚井; Chūsei nōkō yōsuiro Mongakuyu | Katsuragi | | | 34°17′30″N 135°28′09″E | | |
| Mitanizaka 三谷坂; Mitanizaka | Katsuragi | | | 34°17′N 135°31′E | | |
| Saya-dera Site 佐野寺跡; Saya-dera ato | Katsuragi | | | 34°17′46″N 135°29′20″E | | |
| Sanada Yashiki Site 真田屋敷跡; Sanada yashiki ato | Kudoyama | | | 34°17′27″N 135°33′35″E | | |
| Toyotomi Clan Grave Site 豊臣家墓所; Toyotomi-ke bosho | Kōya | | | 34°13′15″N 135°36′20″E | | |
| Zen Nun Jōchi Stele 禅尼上智碑; Zen-ni Jōchi ishibumi | Kōya | | | 34°13′02″N 135°36′10″E | | |
| Memorial Stele to the Enemy and Allied War Dead During the Imjin War 高麗陣敵味方戦死者供養碑; Kōrai-jin teki mikata senshi-sha kuyō-hi | Kōya | | | 34°13′05″N 135°36′13″E | | |
| Sūgen (Husband and Wife) Stone Gorintō 崇源夫人五輪石塔; Sūgen fujin gorin sekitō | Kōya | | | 34°13′09″N 135°36′15″E | | |
| Takeda Shingen and Takeda Katsuyori Grave Site 武田信玄・武田勝頼墓地; Takeda Shingen・Takeda Katsuyori bochi | Kōya | | | 34°12′59″N 135°35′54″E | | |
| Itogamura Ichirizuka 糸我村の一里塚; Itogamura ichirizuka | Arida | | | | | |
| Hajikami Kofun 椒の古墳; Hajikami no kofun | Arida | | | 34°06′21″N 135°07′13″E | | |
| Kishū Mikan Place of Origin 「紀州みかん」最初の地附紀州柑橘剏祖之碑 "Kishū mikan" saisho no chi tsuketari Kishū kankitsu shōso no hi | Arida | designation includes a stele to the progenitor of Kishū Citreae | | 34°03′58″N 135°10′57″E | | |
| Kumezaki Ōji Site 久米崎王子跡; Kumezaki ōji ato | Yuasa | | | 34°01′41″N 135°11′00″E | | |
| Myōe Shōnin Site Karumo-jima 明恵上人遺跡 刈藻島; Myōe Shōnin iseki Karumo-jima | Yuasa | | | 34°01′52″N 135°07′53″E | | |
| Jinsen-ji "Records of Experience of the Great Earthquake and Tsunami" Stele 深専寺「大地震津波心得の記」碑; Jinsenji "dai-jishin tsunami kokoroe no ki" hi | Yuasa | | | 34°02′05″N 135°10′38″E | | |
| Sakasagawa Ōji 逆川王子; Sakasagawa ōji | Yuasa | | | 34°02′59″N 135°11′00″E | | |
| Shōraku-ji Precinct (Kumano Sankeimichi Kiji) 勝楽寺境内(熊野参詣道紀伊路); Shōrakuji keidai (Kumano Sankei-michi Kiiji) | Yuasa | | | 34°01′47″N 135°11′00″E | | |
| Itoga Pass 糸我峠; Itoga-tōge | Yuasa | | | | | |
| Taikyū Shrine 耐久社; Taikyū-sha | Hirogawa | | | 34°01′28″N 135°10′11″E | | |
| Hamaguchi Goryō Stele 濱口梧陵碑; Hamaguchi Goryō hi | Hirogawa | | | 34°01′06″N 135°10′31″E | | |
| Hōtō and Hōkyōintō 奥の宝塔及び宝篋印塔; Oku no hōtō oyobi hōkyōintō | Aridagawa | | | | | |
| Nakisawame Kofun 泣沢女の古墳; Nakisawame no kofun | Aridagawa | | | 34°03′48″N 135°12′20″E | | |
| Toya Castle Site 鳥屋城址; Toya-jōshi | Aridagawa | | | 34°03′49″N 135°16′20″E | | |
| Sōgi Hōshi Residence Site 宗祇法師屋敷跡; Sōgi hōshi yashiki ato | Aridagawa | | | 34°03′46″N 135°12′36″E | | |
| Higashiōtani Sutra Mound Site 東大谷経塚遺跡附和鏡; Higashiōtani kyōzuka iseki tsuketari wakyō | Aridagawa | designation includes a Japanese-style mirror | | | | |
| Iwauchi Kofun Cluster 岩内古墳群; Iwauchi kofun-gun | Gobō | | | 33°53′18″N 135°10′27″E | | |
| Hotokeido and Former Ueno Ōji Site (Kumano Sankeimichi Kiji) 仏井戸・上野王子旧地(熊野参詣道紀伊路); Hotokeido・Ueno Ōji kyū-chi (Kumano Sankei-michi Kiiji) | Gobō | | | 33°49′39″N 135°11′04″E | | |
| Kameyama Castle Site 亀山城跡; Kameyama-jō ato | Gobō | | | 33°54′39″N 135°09′17″E | | |
| Tokuhon Shōnin Birthplace 徳本上人誕生遺跡; Tokuhon Shōnin tanjō iseki | Hidaka | | | 33°55′47″N 135°05′55″E | | |
| Taie Ōji Site 高家王子跡; Taie ōji ato | Hidaka | | | 33°56′04″N 135°08′25″E | | |
| Mukaiyama Kofun 向山古墳; Mukaiyama kofun | Hidaka | | | | | |
| Benzaitenyama Kofun 辨財天山古墳; Benzaitenyama kofun | Hidaka | | | | | |
| Nyakuichiōji Jinja Precinct (Kumano Sankeimichi Kiji) 若一王子神社境内(熊野参詣道紀伊路); Nyakuichiōji Jinja keidai (Kumano Sankei-michi Kiiji) | Hidaka | | | 33°55′20″N 135°05′04″E | | |
| Sonkō-ji 尊光寺; Sonkōji | Hidakagawa | | | 33°55′33″N 135°11′09″E | | |
| Iwashiro Musubi-Matsu 岩代の結松; Iwashiro musubi-matsu | Minabe | | | 33°47′00″N 135°16′17″E | | |
| Iwashiro Ōji Site 高家王子跡; Iwashiro ōji ato | Minabe | | | 33°46′51″N 135°16′39″E | | |
| Senri Ōji Site 千里王子跡; Senri ōji ato | Minabe | | | 33°46′21″N 135°17′40″E | | |
| Minabe Ōji Site 三鍋王子跡; Minabe ōji ato | Minabe | | | 33°46′13″N 135°19′13″E | | |
| Nakayama Ōji Site 中山王子跡; Nakayama ōji ato | Inami | | | 33°47′51″N 135°14′54″E | | |
| Kirimezaki Burial Mound 切目崎塚穴; Kirimezaki tsukaana | Inami | | | 33°46′56″N 135°14′08″E | | |
| Kiribe Ōji Site 切部王子跡; Kiribe ōji ato | Inami | | | 33°48′09″N 135°13′54″E | | |
| Detachi Ōji Site 出立王子跡; Detachi ōji ato | Tanabe | | | 33°44′02″N 135°22′09″E | | |
| Chikatsuyu Hōtō 近露の宝塔; Chikatsuyu hōtō | Tanabe | | | | | |
| Nonagase Clan-Yokoya Clan Grave Site 野長瀬氏・横矢氏一族の墓所; Nonagase-shi Yokoya-shi ichizoku no bosho | Tanabe | | | 33°48′59″N 135°36′33″E | | |
| Kuroda Jubee Grave 畔田十兵衛墓; Kuroda Jubee no haka | Tanabe | | | | | |
| Mediaeval Imperial Visit Lodging Site; Motomiya Takenobō Yashiki Site 中世行幸御宿泊所 本宮竹の坊屋敷跡; Chūsei gyōkō goshukuhakujo Motomiya Takenobō yashiki ato | Tanabe | | | 33°50′08″N 135°46′20″E | | |
| Ayukawa Ōji Site 鮎川王子跡; Ayukawa ōji ato | Tanabe | | | 33°43′52″N 135°29′13″E | | |
| Cliff Buddha Name Stele (So-called Ippen Shōnin Buddha Name Stone) 磨崖名号碑(伝一遍上人名号石); Magai myōgō hi (den-Ippen Shōnin myōgō ishi) | Tanabe | | | 33°49′46″N 135°45′28″E | | |
| Hosshinmon Ōji Site 発心門王子跡付南無房堂跡; Hosshinmon ōji ato tsuketari Namu Hōdō ato | Tanabe | designation includes the Namu Hōdō Site | | 33°51′42″N 135°43′14″E | | |
| Tenchūgumi Shishi Imprisonment Storehouse 天誅組志士幽閉の倉; Tenchūgumi shishi yūhei no kura | Tanabe | | | | | |
| Aku River Thousand Buddhas 安久川の千躰仏; Aku-gawa no sentaibutsu | Shirahama | | | 34°14′50″N 135°18′43″E | | |
| Hisamezuka Kofun 火雨塚古墳; Hisamezuka kofun | Shirahama | | | 33°41′08″N 135°20′36″E | | |
| Aku River Burial Mound 安久川の塚穴; Aku-gawa no tsukaana | Shirahama | | | | | |
| Ichinose Ōji Site 一瀬王子跡; Ichinose ōji ato | Kamitonda | | | 33°42′59″N 135°28′36″E | | |
| Hama Ōji Site 浜王子跡; Hama ōji ato | Shingū | | | 33°43′02″N 136°00′08″E | | |
| Sano Ōji Site 佐野王子跡; Sano ōji ato | Shingū | | | 33°40′20″N 135°58′16″E | | |
| Stele Inscribed with the Lotus Sutra 書写妙法蓮華印塔; Shosha Myōhō Renge intō | Shingū | | | 33°43′40″N 135°59′07″E | | |
| Kamikurayama Steps and Dismounting Marker 神倉山付石段「下馬」標石; Kamikurayama tsuki ishidan "geba" hyōseki | Shingū | | | 33°43′20″N 135°58′58″E | | |
| Ippen Shōnin Name Stele Erection Site 一遍上人名号碑建立之地; Ippen Shōnin myōgō hi konryū no chi | Shingū | | | 33°48′31″N 135°49′58″E | | |
| Yamagami Fudōdō Site 山上不動堂跡; Yamagami Fudōdō ato | Nachikatsuura | | | 33°40′39″N 135°53′21″E | | |
| Emperor Kameyama Sotoba Erection Site 亀山天皇御卒塔婆建立地跡; Kameyama tennō gosotoba konryū-chi ato | Nachikatsuura | at Kumano Nachi Taisha | | 33°40′07″N 135°53′23″E | | |
| Hanayama Hōō Confinement Site 花山法皇御籠所跡; Hanayama hōō gokago-sho ato | Nachikatsuura | at Kumano Nachi Taisha | | 33°40′07″N 135°53′23″E | | |
| Tafuke Ōji Site 多富気王子跡; Tafuke ōji ato | Nachikatsuura | | | 33°40′17″N 135°53′55″E | | |
| Mediaeval Imperial Visit Enlightened Lodging Site 中世行幸啓御泊所跡; Chūsei gyōkō-kei goshukuhakujo | Nachikatsuura | at Seiganto-ji | | 33°40′09″N 135°53′24″E | | |
| Daitai-ji Stele 大泰寺の板碑; Daitaiji no itabi | Nachikatsuura | | | 33°35′22″N 135°54′09″E | | |
| Whaling Pioneer Wada Yorimoto Grave 捕鯨の祖和田頼元墓; Hogei no oya Wada Yorimoto no haka | Taiji | | | | | |
| Ertuğrul Shipwreck Sites エルトゥールル号事件関連遺跡群; Erutūruru-gō jiken kanren iseki-gun | Kushimoto | designation comprises four components: the wreckage (船甲羅), place where the survivors reached shore (遭難者上陸地), Kashinosaki Lighthouse Former Official Residence (樫野埼灯台旧官舎), and grave site of the victims (遭難者墓地) | | 33°28′17″N 135°51′42″E | | |
| Muryō-ji Precinct 無量寺境内; Muryōji keidai | Kushimoto | | | 33°28′15″N 135°46′40″E | | |
| Funatoyama Kofun Cluster 船戸山古墳群; Funatoyama kofun-gun | Iwade, Wakayama | | | 34°14′50″N 135°18′43″E | | |
| Shishigase Pass 鹿ヶ瀬峠; Shishigase tōge | Hidaka, Hirogawa | | | 33°58′55″N 135°10′36″E | | |

== Municipal Historic Sites ==
As of 1 May 2021, two hundred and five Sites have been designated as being of municipal importance.

== See also ==
- Cultural Properties of Japan
- Wakayama Prefectural Museum
- Kii Province
- List of Cultural Properties of Japan - historical materials (Wakayama)
- List of Cultural Properties of Japan - archaeological materials (Wakayama)
