= Iwase-Senzuka Kofun Cluster =

Burial mounds in Wakayama, Japan

- 岩橋千塚古墳群 (Japanese)
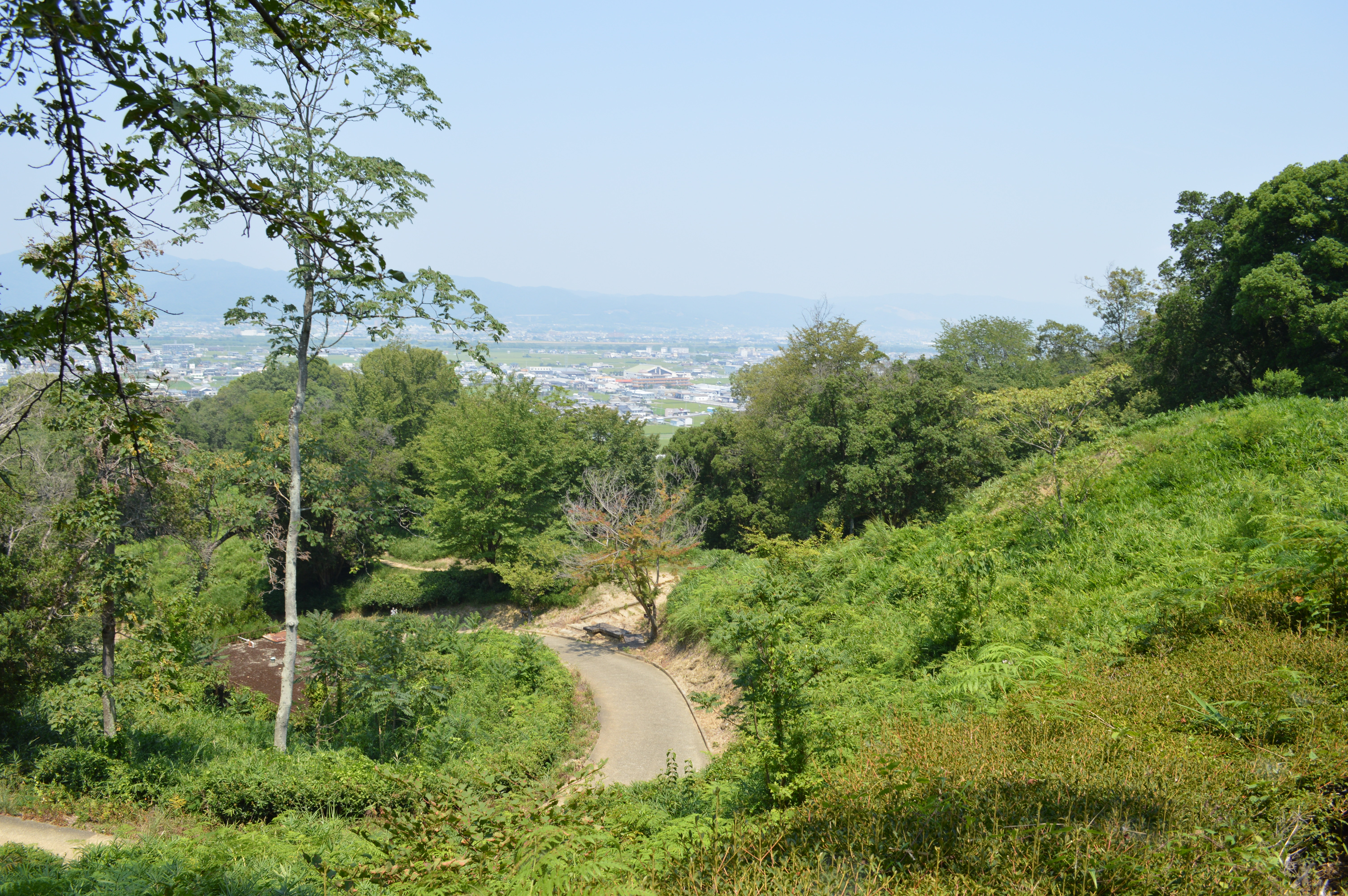
- Iwase-Senzuka Kofun Cluster

- Iwase-Senzuka Kofun Cluster Iwase-Senzuka Kofun Cluster (Japan)
- 34°13′29.8″N 135°13′40.6″E
- Type: Kofun cluster
- Periods: Kofun period
- Location: Wakayama, Japan
- Region: Kansai region

History
- Built: 4th to 7th century AD

Site notes
- Public access: Yes (museum at sie)

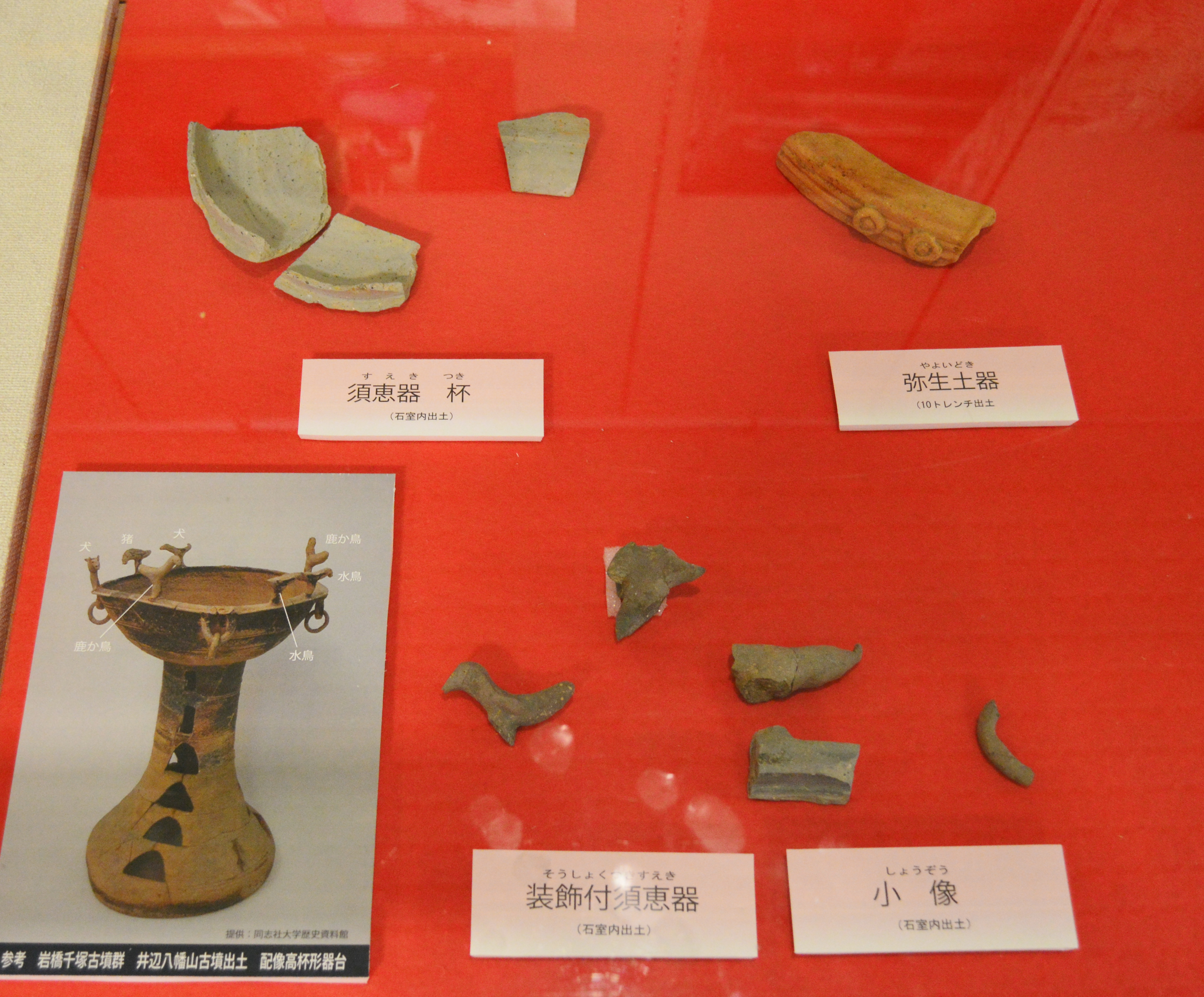
Excavated items from the Tennozuka Kofun

Iwase-Senzuka Kofun Cluster (岩橋千塚古墳群, Iwase-Senzuka kofun gun) is a cluster of Kofun period burial mounds that is located in the Wakayama, in the Kansai region of Japan. One of the largest concentrations of burial mounds in Japan, it consist of over 900 tumuli. It is designated as a National Historic Site in 1931, upgraded to a Special National Historic Site in 1952, and the area under designation expanded in 2016.

== Overview ==
The site is located in the eastern portion of the city of Wakayama, on an east-west extension of the Ryumon Mountains, and west of Yada Pass. It consists of a group of ancient burial mounds related to the kuni no miyatsuko of Kii Province, and consists of approximately 900 kofun, making it one of the largest sites in Japan. These tumuli are divided between the Hanayama branch in the Narugami district in the north and the Ibe Hachiman burial mound in the Okazaki district in the south. In the western portion of the site are the Hinokuma Shrine and Kunikakasu Shrine, which enshrine the spirits of the kuni no miyatsuko. The kofun consist mostly of circular type (empun (円墳)) and square-type (hōfun (方墳)), with only one percent as zenpō-kōen-fun (前方後円墳), which are shaped like a keyhole, having one square end and one circular end, when viewed from above. It is believed that these tumuli were all constructed from around the middle of the 4th century, until the proclamation of the Taika Reforms in the middle of the 7th century. With regards to the burial facilities, the earliest kofun had clay-lined burial chambers with box-type sarcophagus. This evolved into chlorite schist-lined stone chambers for later burials. The schist was separated into slabs, which were stacked to form the walls, into which several stone beams were embedded for structural integrity, and the ceiling was covered with large stones.

Excavations began in 1906, and have been ongoing intermittently to then present day. Many of the finds from the site are on display at the Kiifudoki-no-oka Museum of History.

== Gallery ==
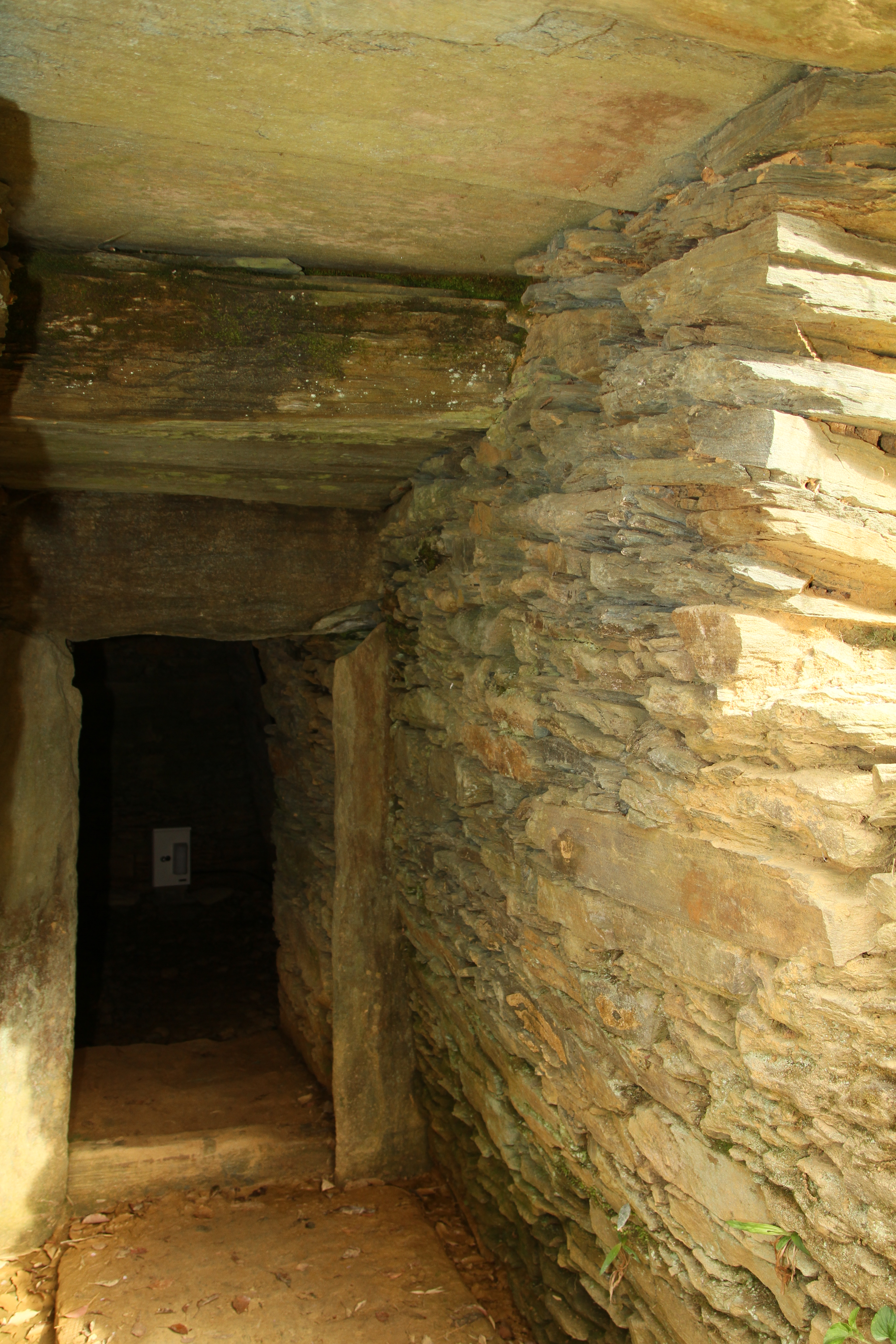
Maeyama Kofun A13 Corridor from the entrance to the burial chamber

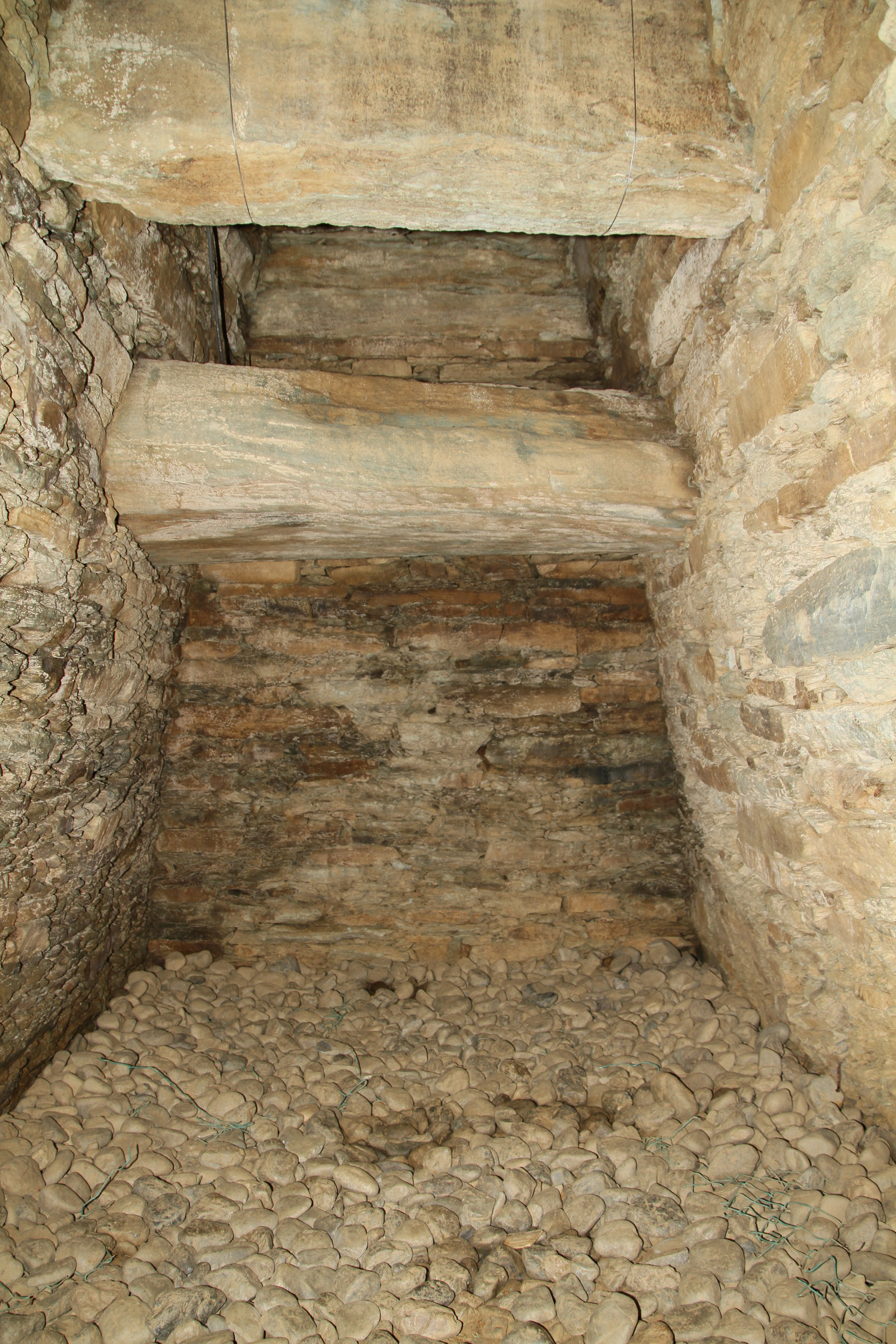
Maeyama Kofun A46 Burial chamber

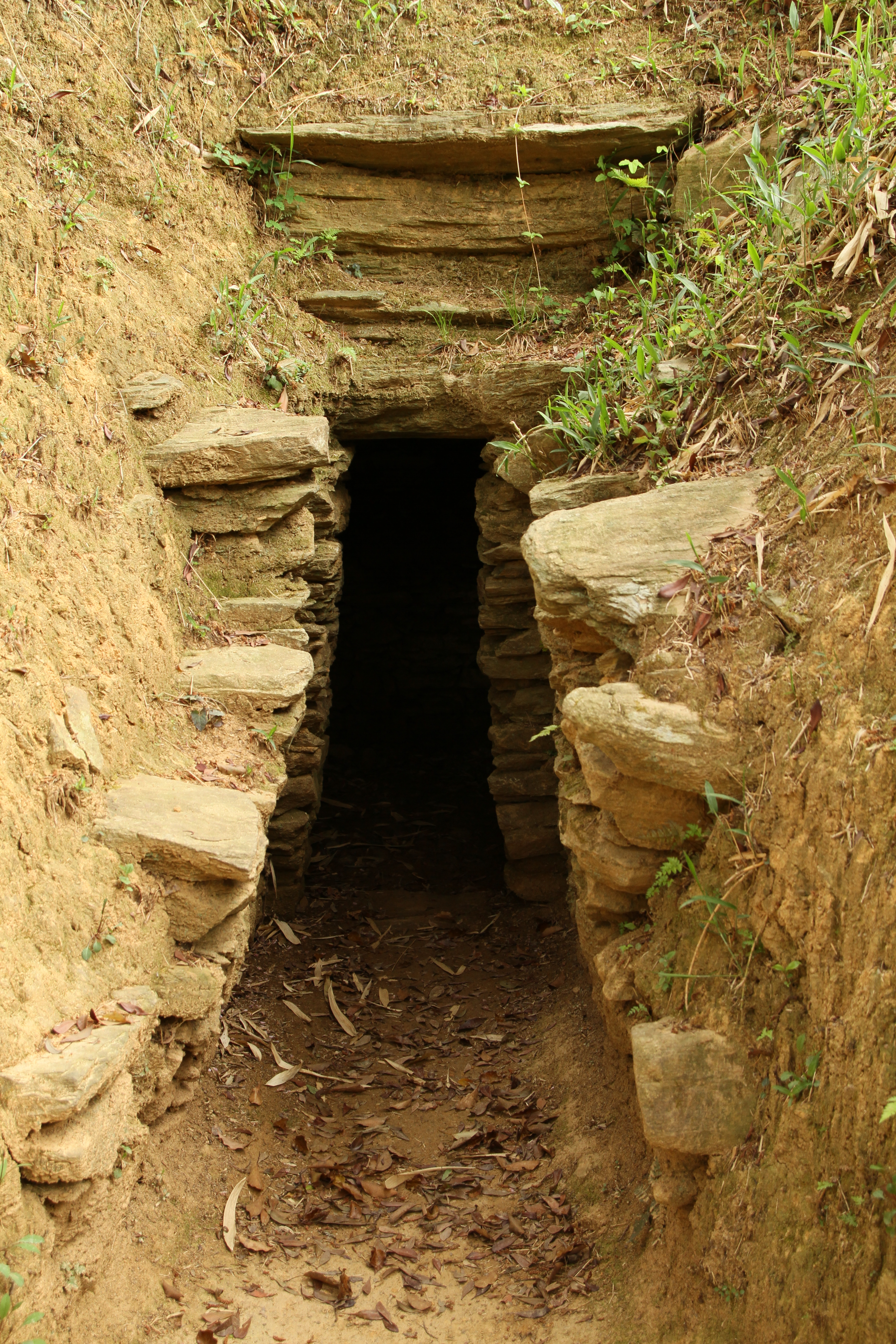
Maeyama Kofun A56 Entrance area to the stone chamber

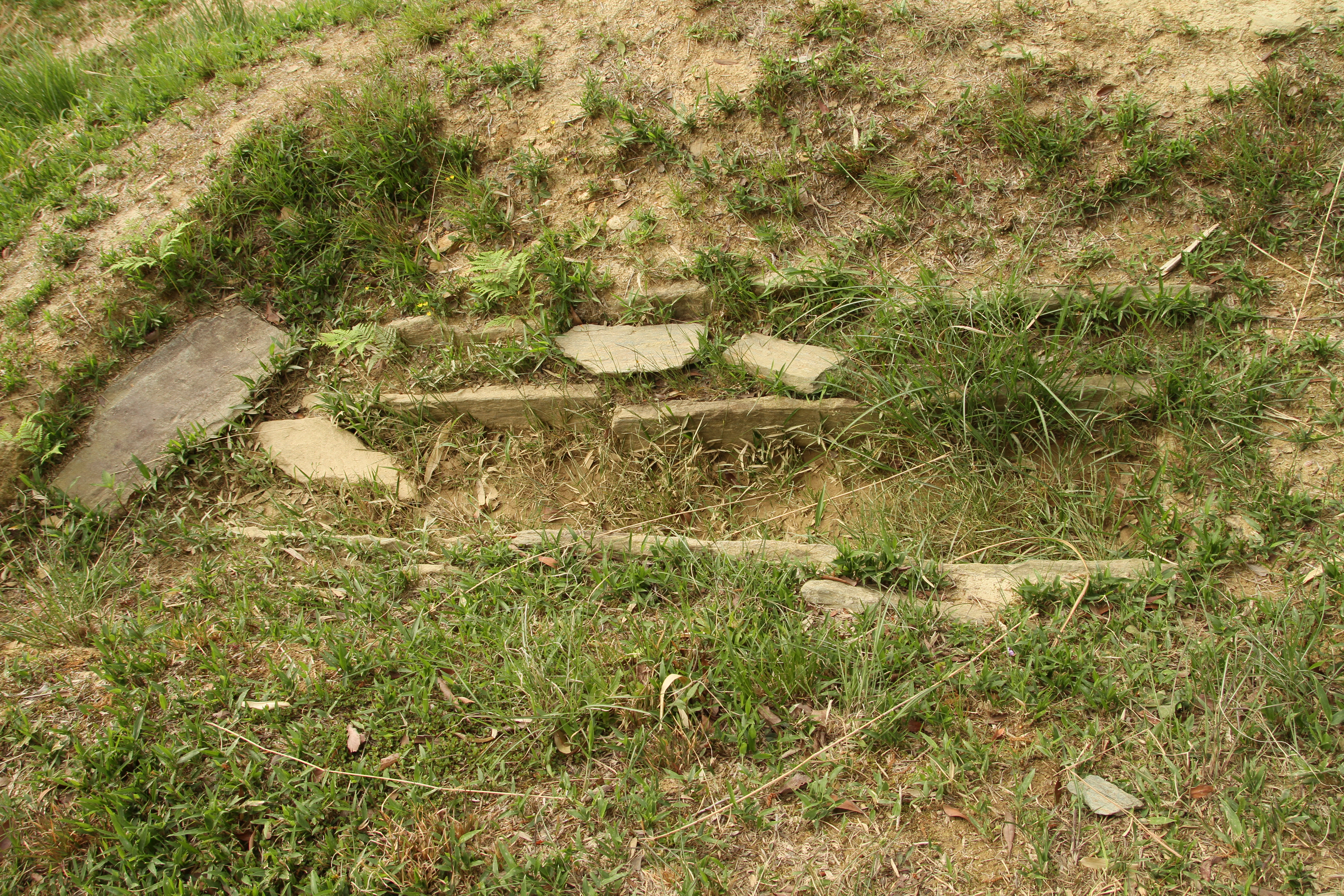
Maeyama Kofun A100 Stone coffin made from stone slabs

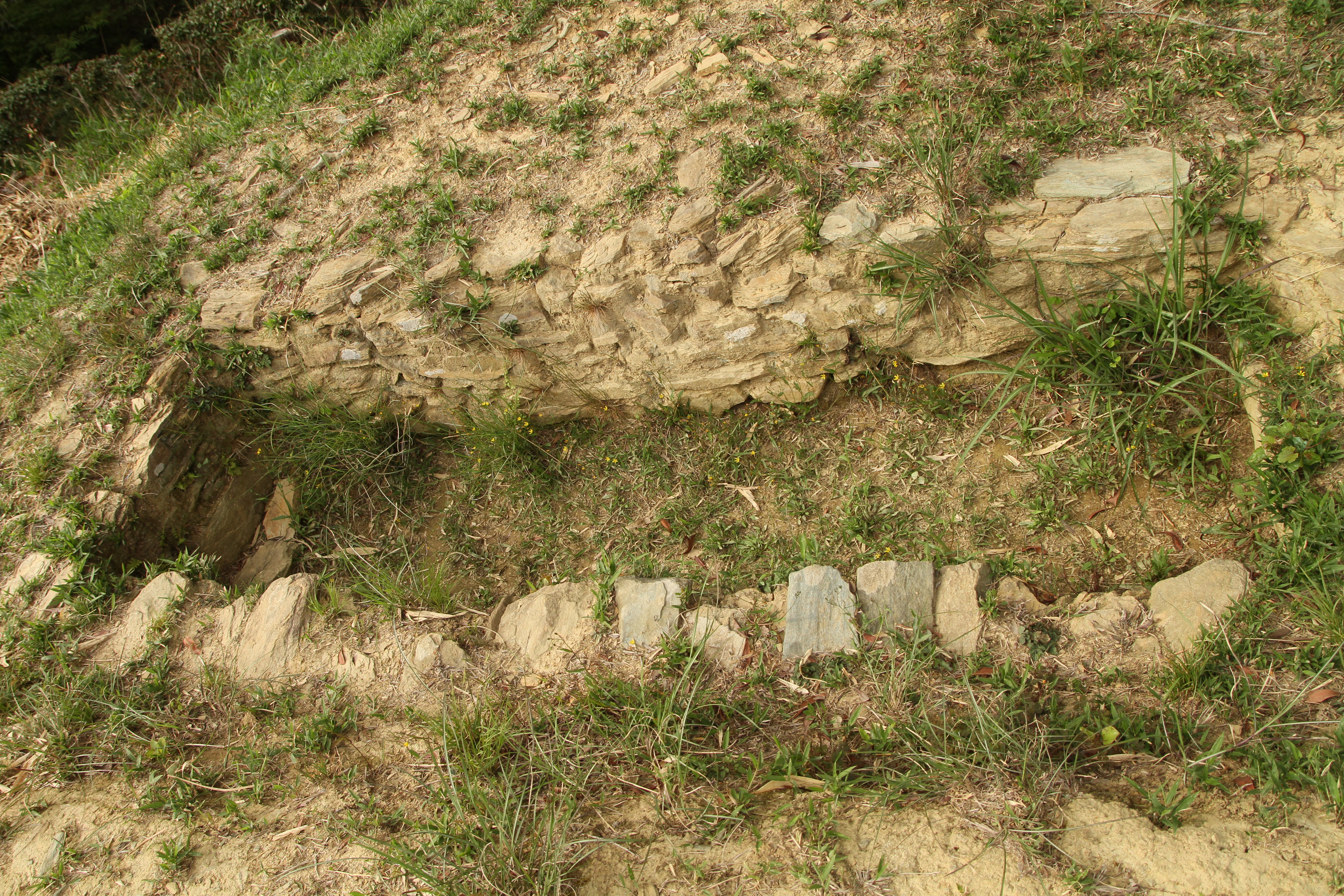
Maeyama Kofun A111 Shaft-like stone chamber

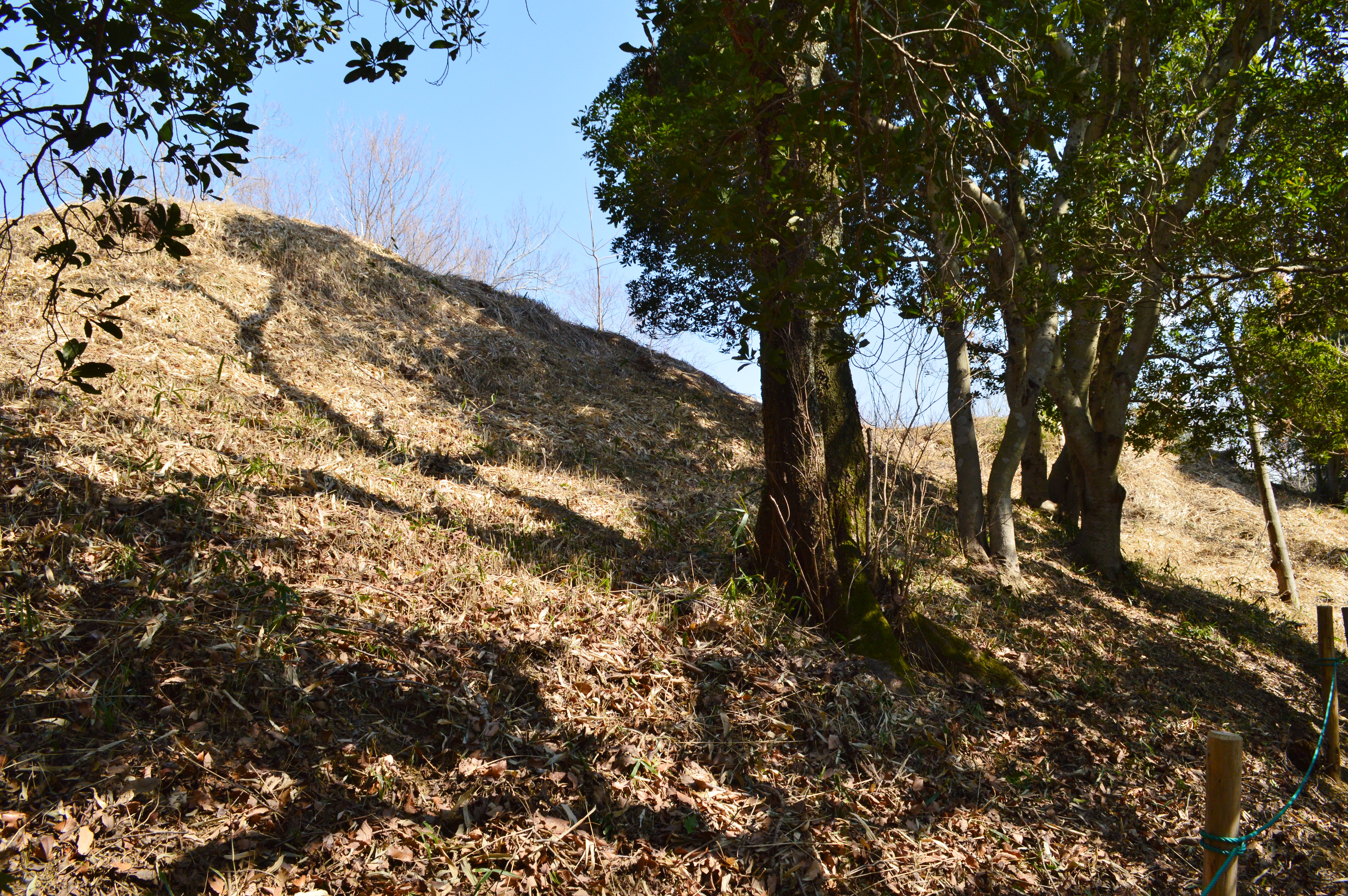
Maeyama Kofun B53, Shōgun-zuka Kofun

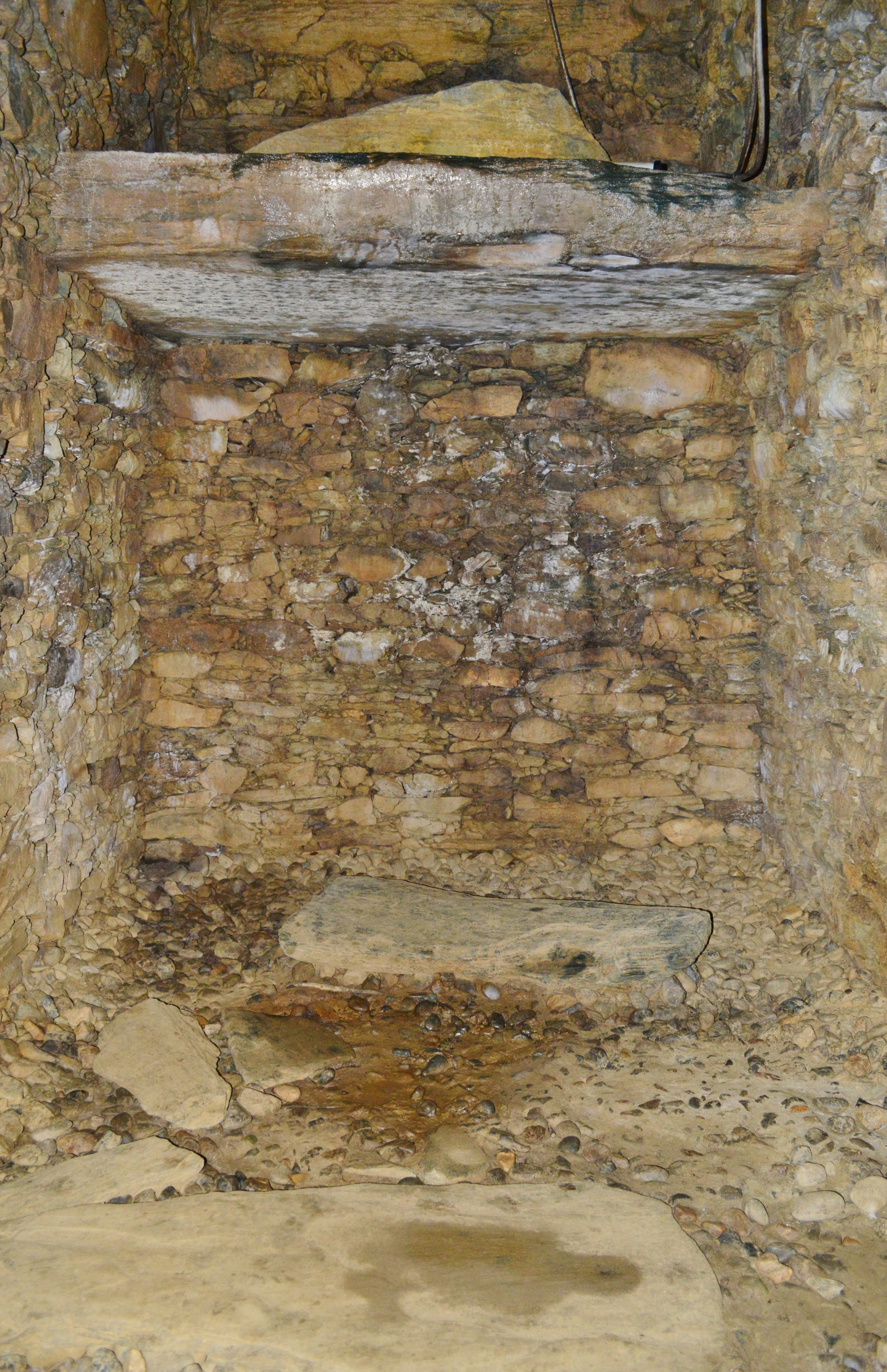
Maeyama Kofun B53, Stone chamber of the Shogunzsuka Kofun

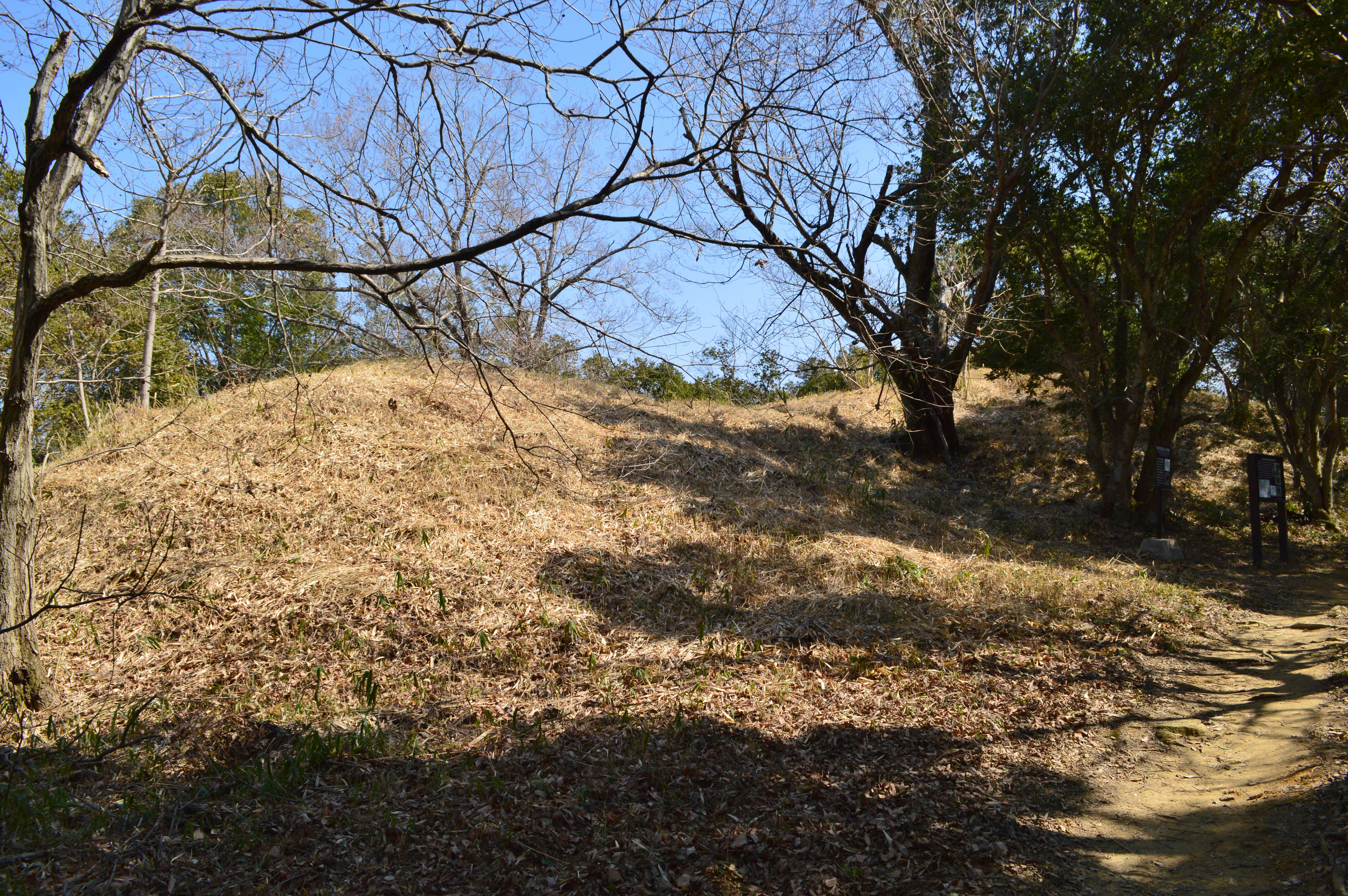
Maeyama Kofun B67, Chijizuka Kofun

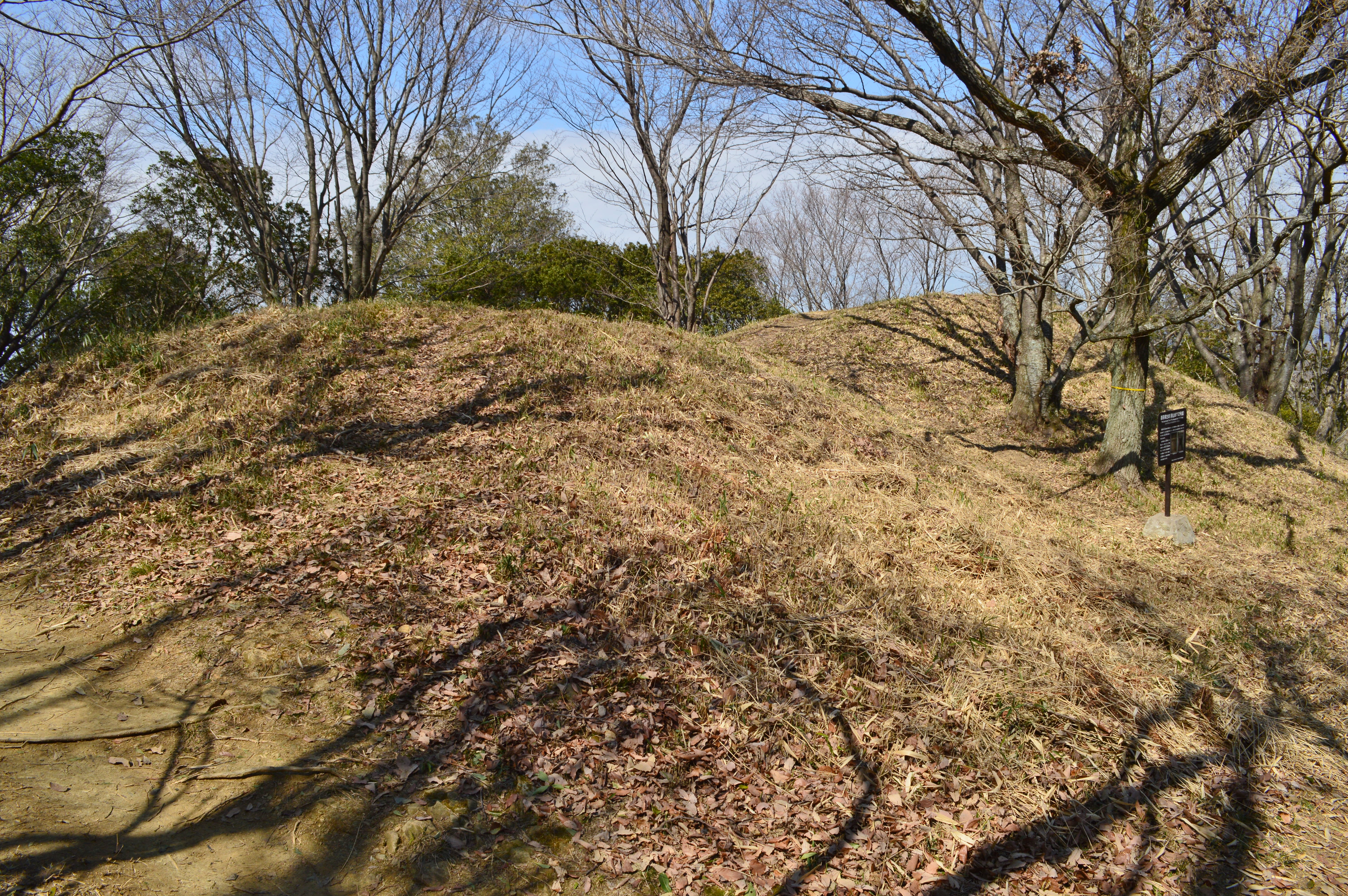
Maeyama Kofun B112, Gunchōzuka Kofun

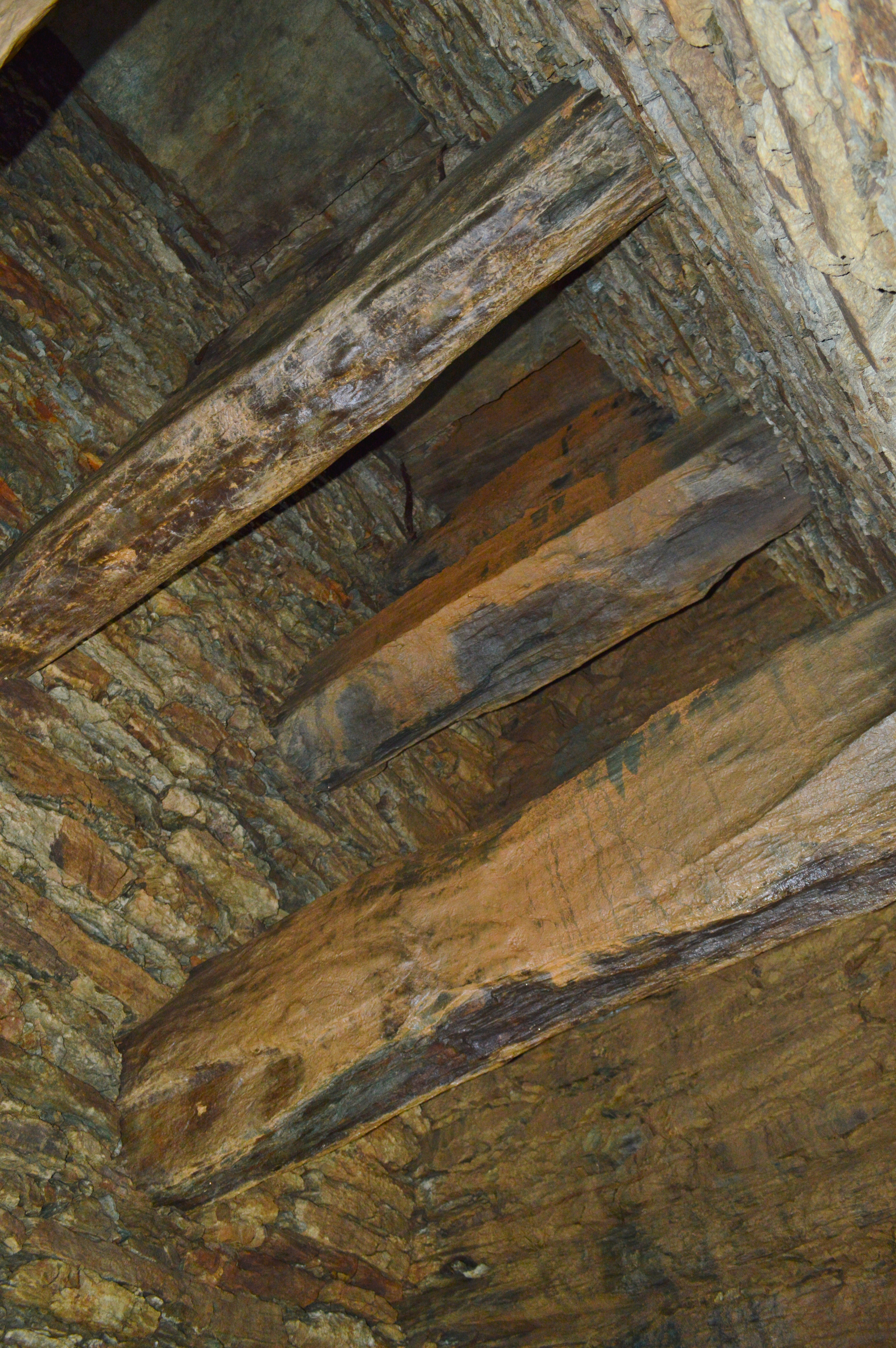
Stone chamber of the Tennōzuka Kofun

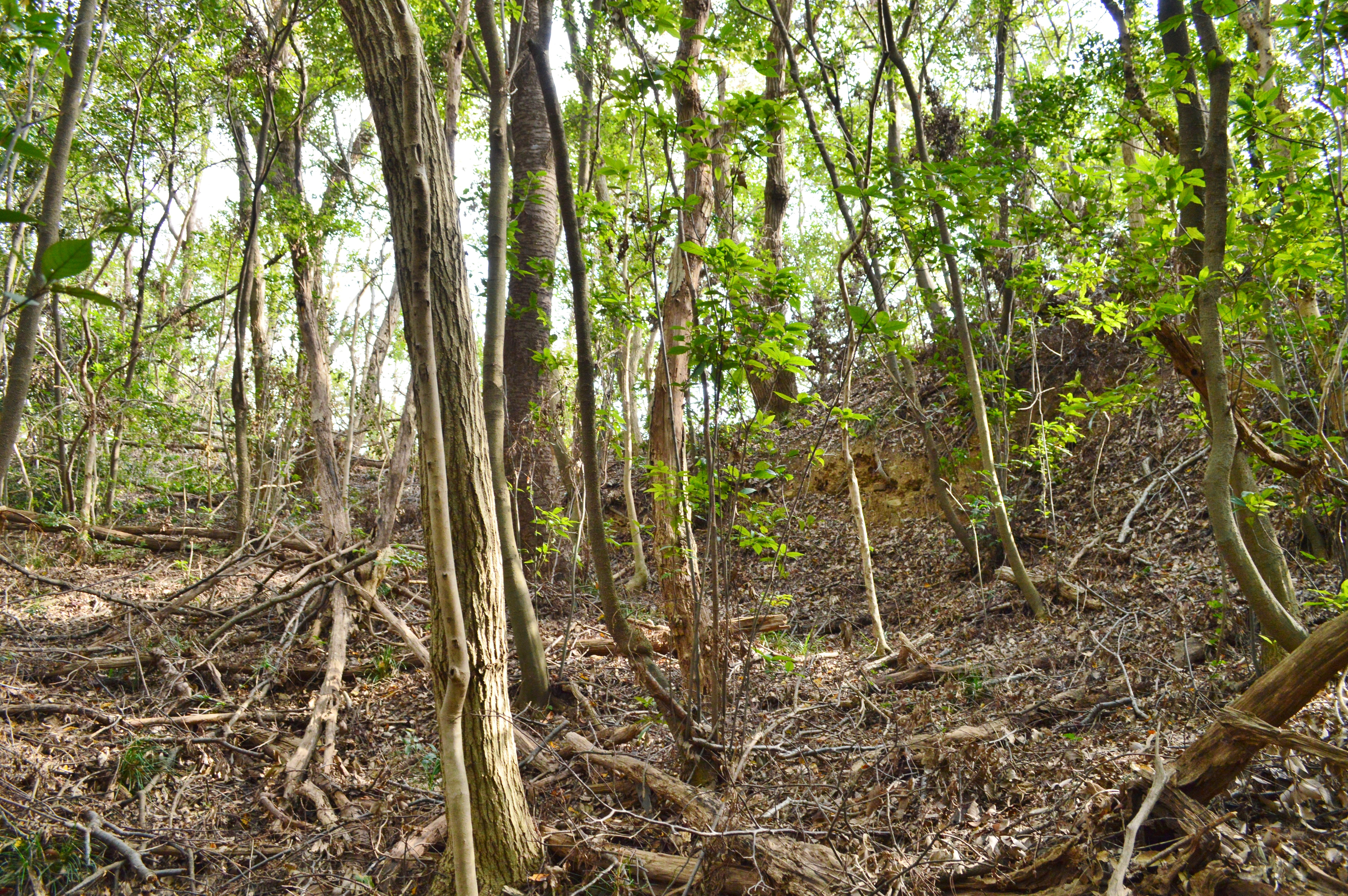
Hanayama Kofun 6 Tumulus

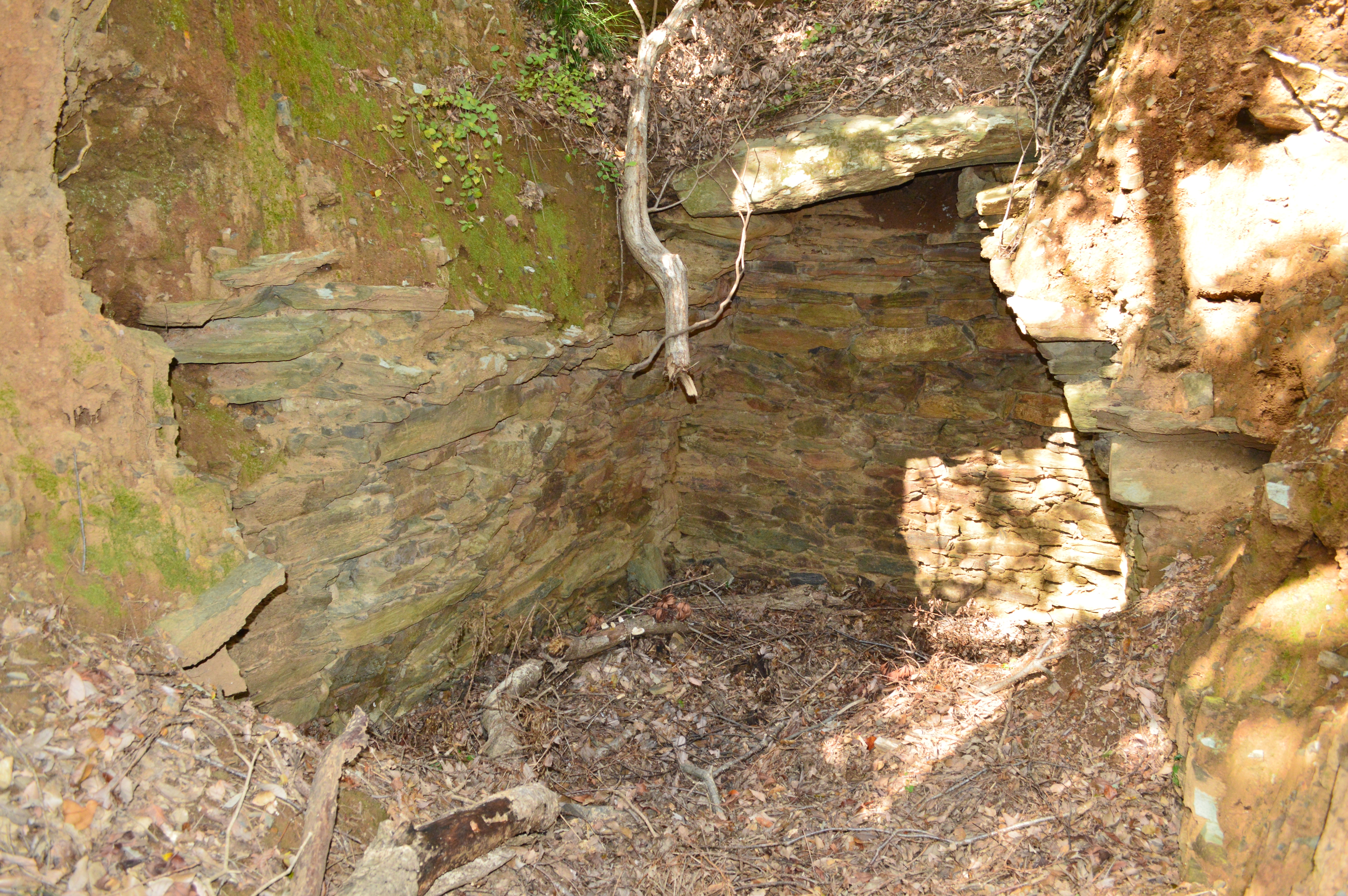
Hanayama Kofun 6 Stone chamber

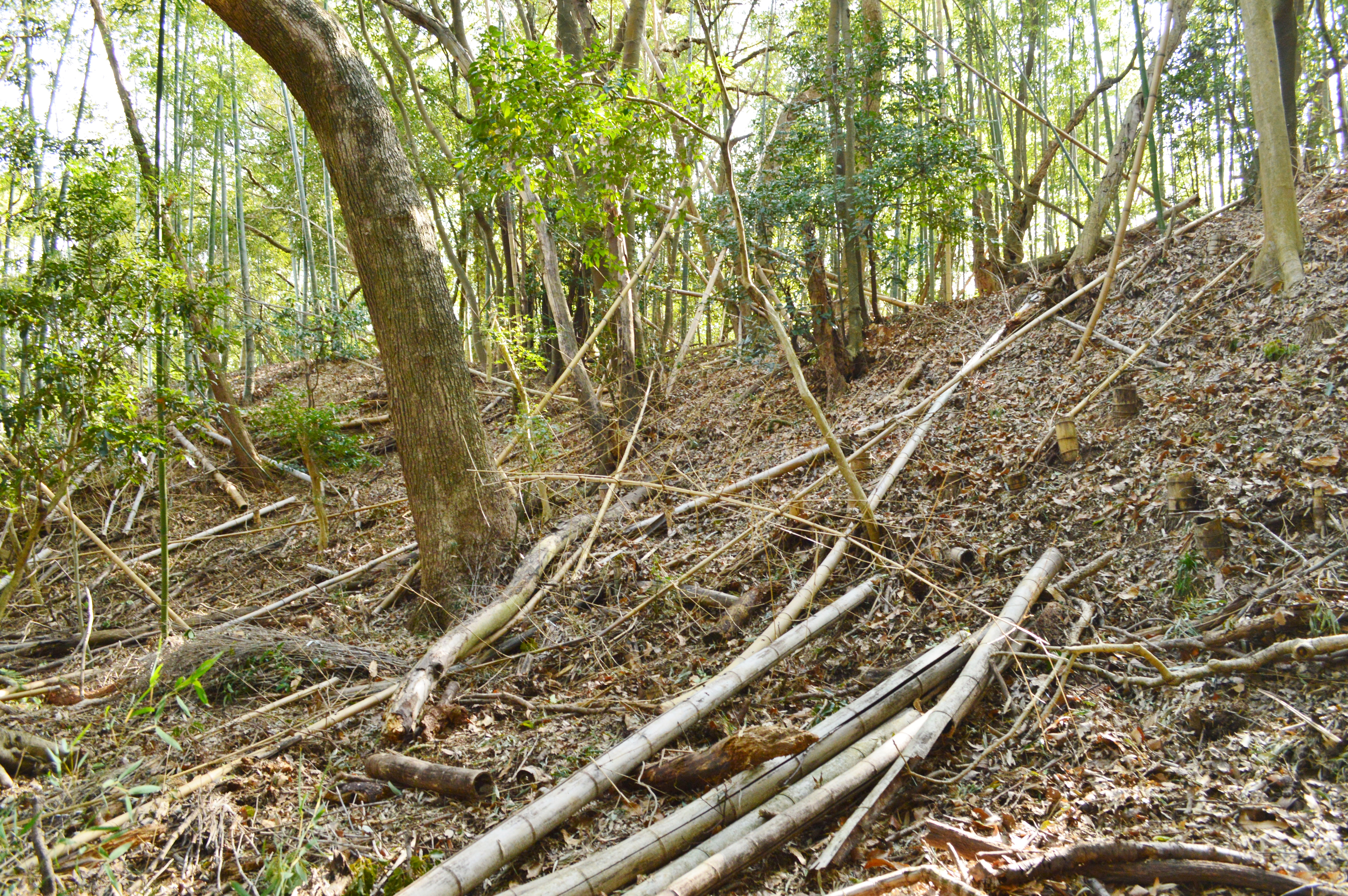
Inbe Maeyama Kofun B10, Inbe Hachiman-yama Kofun

== See also ==
- List of Historic Sites of Japan (Wakayama)
