= West Express Ginga =

Japanese overnight sleeper train service

WEST EXPRESS Ginga
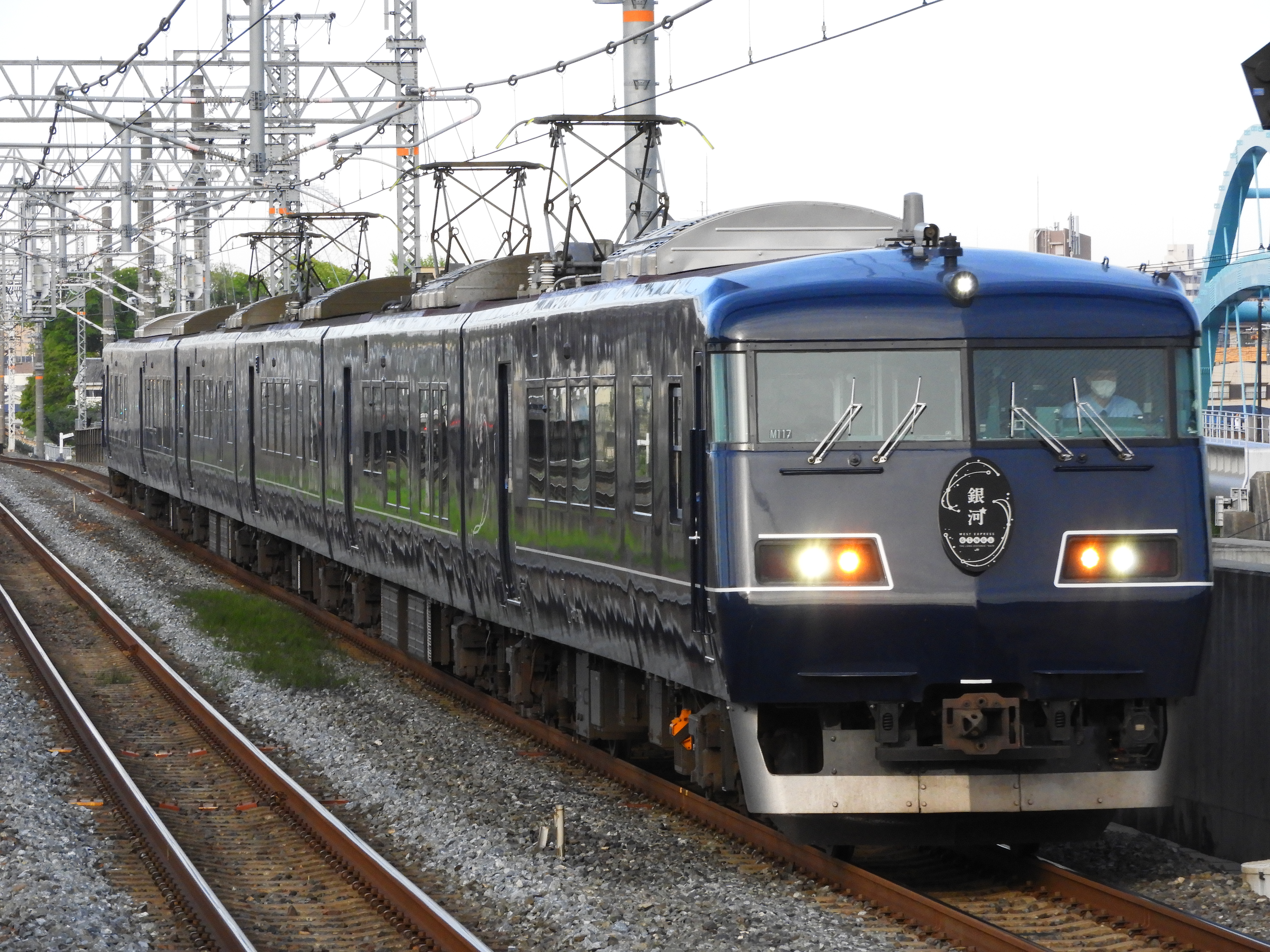
- The West Express Ginga at JR-Sōjiji Station

Overview
- Service type: Limited express
- Status: Operational
- Locale: Japan
- First service: 11 September 2020
- Current operator: JR West

Route
- Termini: Kyoto (San'in Route, Kinan Route); Osaka (San'yo Route); Izumoshi (San'in Route); Shimonoseki (San'yo Route); Shingu (Kinan Route)
- Lines used: Tōkaidō Main Line; San'yō Main Line; Hakubi Line; San'in Main Line; Osaka Loop Line; Hanwa Line; Kisei Main Line

Technical
- Rolling stock: 117 series
- Track gauge: 1,067 mm (3 ft 6 in)
- Electrification: 1,500 V DC overhead

The West Express Ginga, stylized as WEST EXPRESS Ginga (Japanese: ウエストエクスプレス 銀河, romanized: Uesuto Ekusupuresu Ginga), is a limited express train service in Japan operated by the West Japan Railway Company (JR West) since September 2020. It is the second service using the Ginga name, after the now-discontinued Ginga.

== Overview ==
JR West first discussed visions for a new long-distance train in 2016, after launching the Twilight Express Mizukaze. In 2019 plans for the West Express Ginga, including its name, design, and rolling stock, were officially revealed.

Ginga means galaxy in Japanese. The service is designed to run as a sightseeing train in western Japan (hence West Express). The service includes passengers being treated to local cuisine and sightseeing guides both on the train and at different stations.

Originally meant to start operations in May 2020, the launch of the service was delayed to September 11, 2020, due to the COVID-19 pandemic.

== Operation status ==
The West Express Ginga is a limited express train service that requires reservations ahead of time. Unlike the original Ginga, it is not strictly a sleeper train, and has both nighttime and daytime routes. It currently runs three different service routes, each at different times of the year:

- San'in Route from Kyoto to Izumoshi
- San'yo Route from Osaka to Shimonoseki
- Kinan Route from Kyoto to Shingu

=== Stations ===
Kinan Route (Kyoto to Shingu)

In 2024, the West Express Ginga ran its Kinan route from 1 July to 25 September. In 2025, the West Express Ginga will run its Kinan route from 25 August to 29 October.

Kinan Route - Night (To Shingu)
Station	Line	Arrival	Departure
Kyoto	JR Kyoto Line	—	21:15
Shin-Osaka	JR Kyoto Line	22:10	22:13
Osaka	JR Kyoto Line	22:17	22:19
Wakayama	Kisei Main Line	23:42	0:40
Kushimoto	Kisei Main Line	6:50	8:00
Kii-Katsuura	Kisei Main Line	9:05	9:10
Shingu	Kisei Main Line	9:37	—

Kinan Route - Day (To Kyoto) (Note: Weekend times are shown in parentheses.)
Station	Line	Arrival	Departure
Shingu	Kisei Main Line	—	13:05
Kii-Katsuura	Kisei Main Line	13:25	13:31
Taiji	Kisei Main Line	13:42	13:45
Koza	Kisei Main Line	14:20	14:23
Kushimoto	Kisei Main Line	14:31	15:07
Susami	Kisei Main Line	15:46	16:00
Shirahama	Kisei Main Line	16:23	16:24
Kii-Tanabe	Kisei Main Line	16:35	16:54
Gobō	Kisei Main Line	17:27	17:28
Kainan	Kisei Main Line	18:06	18:23
Wakayama	Kisei Main Line	18:33	18:44
Hineno	Hanwa Line	19:35 (19:28)	19:37 (19:31)
Tennōji	Hanwa Line	20:03	20:05
Osaka	JR Kyoto Line	20:16	20:17
Shin-Osaka	JR Kyoto Line	20:21	20:22
Kyoto	JR Kyoto Line	20:53	—

San'in Route (Kyoto to Izumoshi)

In 2024, the West Express Ginga ran its San'in route from 18 March to 26 June.

WEST EXPRESS Ginga (San'in Route) (Note: ● denotes the train stops at the station, while - denotes the train does not stop at station. Trains going to Kyoto or to Izumoshi are separated by a / for Monday or Friday times.)
Station	Line	To Kyoto	To Izumoshi	Arrival	Departure
Kyoto	JR Kyoto Line	-	●	6:43 / —	— / 21:15
Shin-Osaka	JR Kyoto Line	-	●	6:16 / 22:07	6:17 / 22:17
Osaka	JR Kobe Line	●	●	6:10 / 22:21	6:12 / 22:28
Sannomiya	JR Kobe Line	●	●	5:48 / 22:50	5:49 / 22:51
Kōbe	JR Kobe Line	●	●	5:44 / 22:53	5:45 / 22:55
Nishi-Akashi	JR Kobe Line	-	●	— / 23:12	— / 23:15
Himeji	JR Kobe Line	-	●	— / (0:40 / 23:48)	— / 0:42
Bitchū-Takahashi	Hakubi Line	●	-	21:22 / —	22:00 / —
Shōyama	Hakubi Line	-	●	— / 6:02	— / 6:34
Neu	Hakubi Line	●	-	18:33 / —	18:52 / —
Yonago	Hakubi Line	●	●	17:40 / 7:46	17:42 / (7:56 / 8:18)
Yasugi	San'in Main Line	●	●	17:08 / (8:04 / 8:26)	17:31 / 8:28
Matsue	San'in Main Line	●	●	16:34 / 8:46	16:50 / 9:05
Tamatsukuri-Onsen	San'in Main Line	●	●	16:26 / 9:12	16:27 / 9:13
Shinji	San'in Main Line	●	●	16:16 / 9:24	16:17 / 9:25
Izumoshi	San'in Main Line	●	●	— / 9:39	15:52 / —

San'yo Route (Kyoto to Shimonoseki)

The West Express Ginga will run its San'yo route between 4 October 2024 to 12 March 2025. Originally run between Osaka and Shimonoseki in its first year, the route will be extended to run from Kyoto to Shimonoseki for 2024. In 2025, the West Express Ginga ran its San'yo route between 2 June and 8 September. It will run its San'yo route again between 3 November and 13 December.

San'yo Route - Night (To Shimonoseki) (Note: () denotes Monday departure times.)
Station	Line	Arrival	Departure
Kyoto	JR Kyoto Line	—	21:15
Shin-Osaka	JR Kyoto Line	22:07	22:17
Osaka	JR Kyoto Line	22:21	22:28
Sannomiya	JR Kobe Line	22:50	22:51
Kōbe	JR Kobe Line	22:53	22:55
Nishi-Akashi	JR Kobe Line	23:12	12:15
Himeji	JR Kobe Line	23:48 (00:40)	0:42
Hiroshima	San'yo Main Line	6:42	6:51
Miyajimaguchi	San'yo Main Line	7:16	7:18
Iwakuni	San'yo Main Line	7:37	7:42
Yanai	San'yo Main Line	8:13	8:31
Tokuyama	San'yo Main Line	9:03	9:05
Hōfu	San'yo Main Line	9:28	9:30
Shin-Yamaguchi	San'yo Main Line	9:45	9:47
Ube	San'yo Main Line	10:10	10:11
Shin-Shimonoseki	San'yo Main Line	10:41	10:42
Shimonoseki	San'yo Main Line	10:50	—

San'yo Route - Night (To Kyoto)
Station	Line	Arrival	Departure
Shimonoseki	San'yo Main Line	—	19:43
Shin-Shimonoseki	San'yo Main Line	19:51	19:53
Ube	San'yo Main Line	20:25	20:27
Shin-Yamaguchi	San'yo Main Line	20:49	20:51
Hōfu	San'yo Main Line	21:05	21:07
Tokuyama	San'yo Main Line	21:30	21:33
Yanai	San'yo Main Line	22:04	22:16
Iwakuni	San'yo Main Line	22:44	22:55
Hiroshima	San'yo Main Line	23:43	23:48
Kōbe	JR Kobe Line	5:44	5:45
Sannomiya	JR Kobe Line	5:48	5:49
Ōsaka	JR Kyoto Line	6:10	6:12
Shin-Ōsaka	JR Kyoto Line	6:16	6:17
Kyōto	JR Kyoto Line	6:43	—

== Rolling stock ==
The service consists of 6 cars modified from 117 series units that were previously used for the Kansai region's Special Rapid Service. The livery was designed by Yasuyuki Kawanishi, who also designed the Echigo Tokimeki Resort Setsugekka and Hisatsu Orange Railway.

== Gallery ==
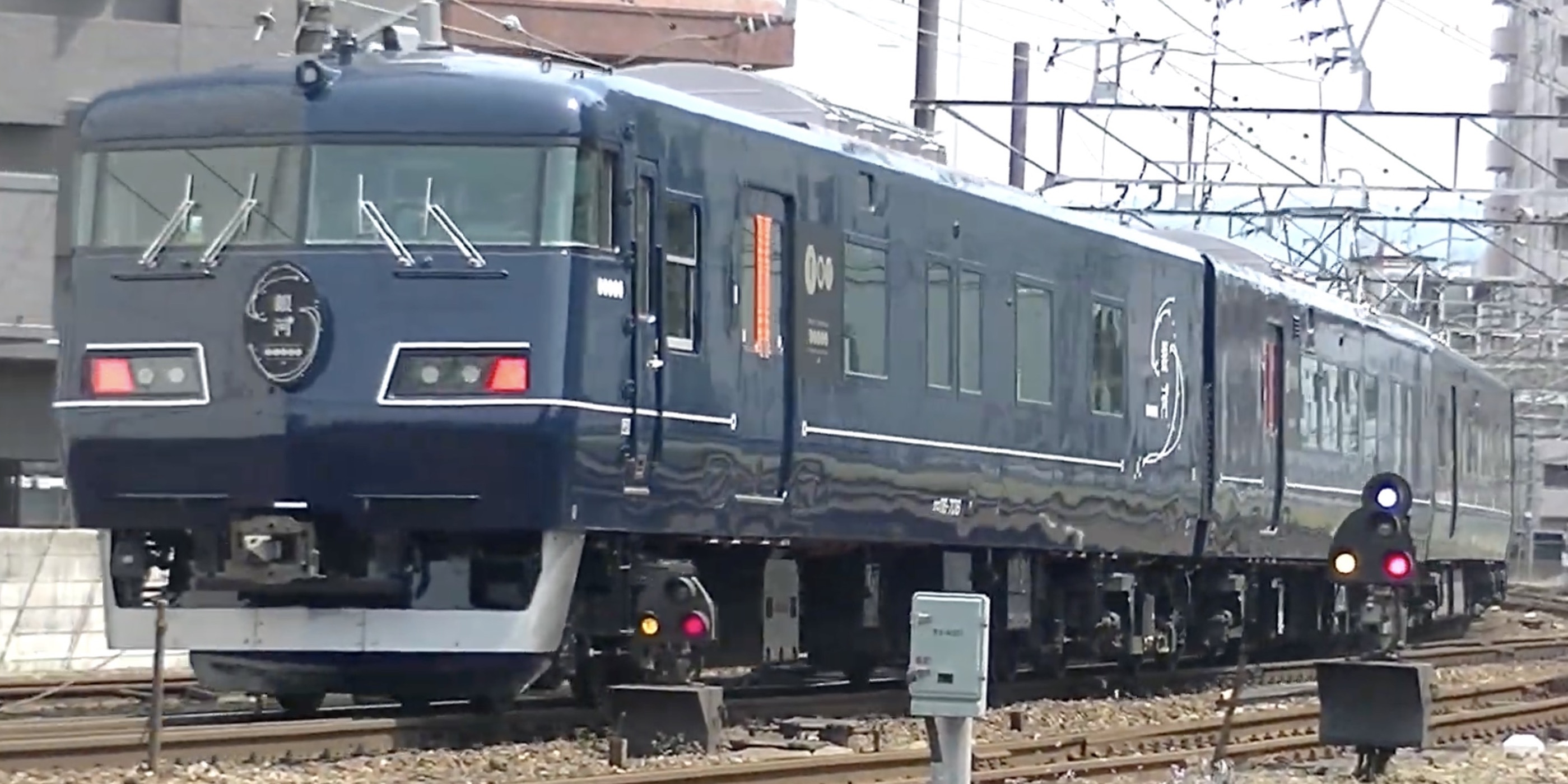
Car 1 (KuHa116-7016)

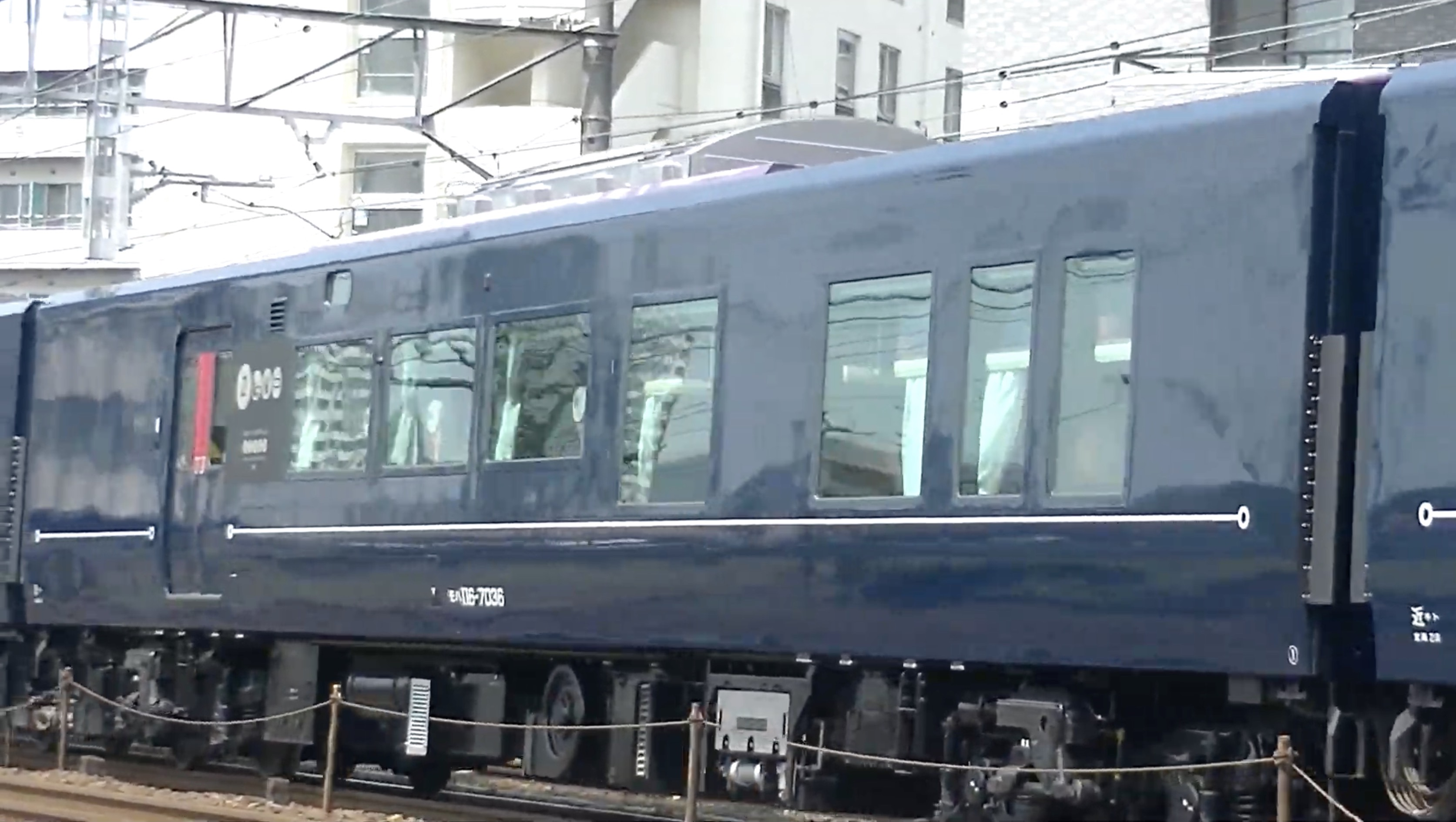
Car 2 (MoHa116-7036)

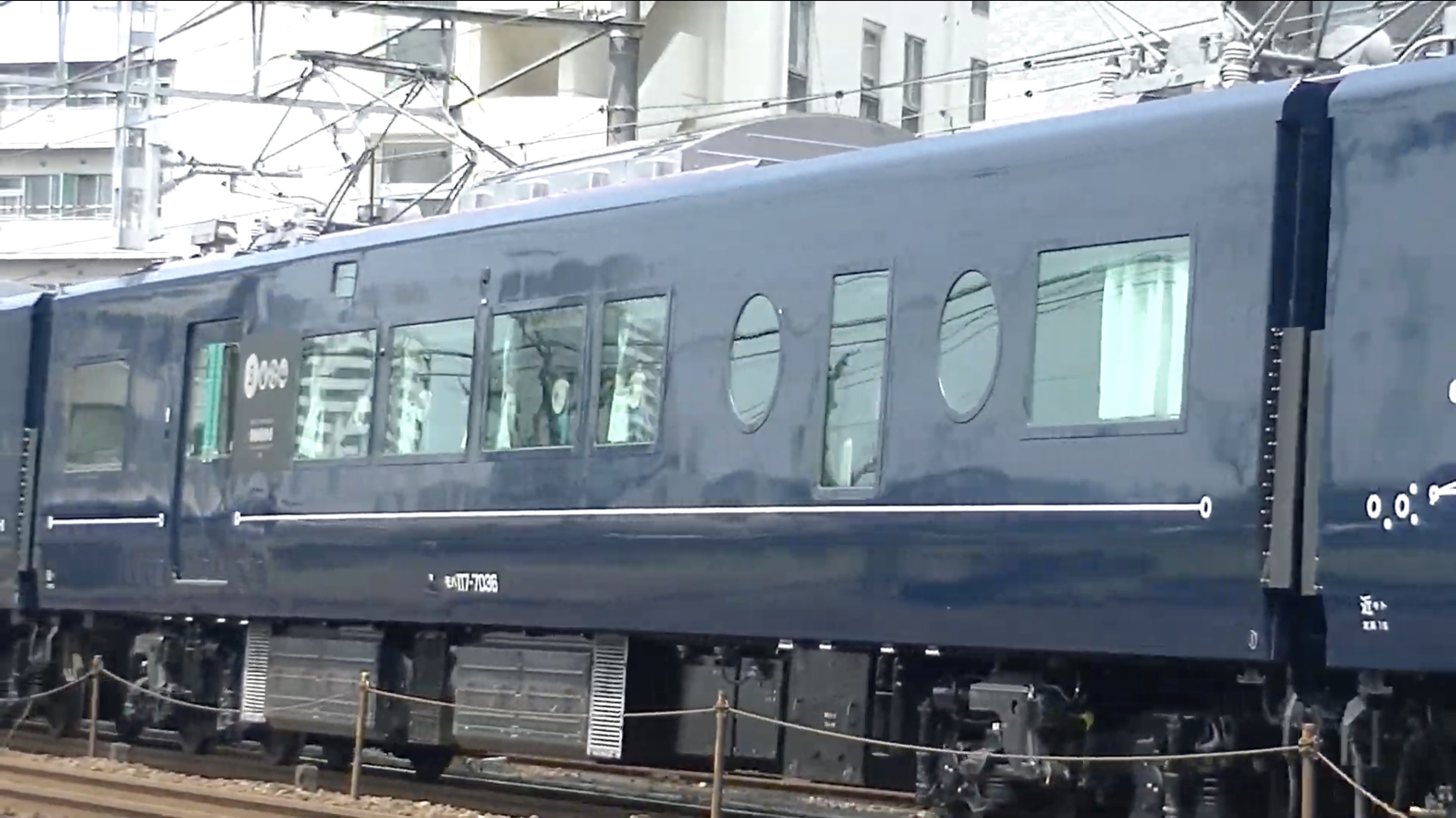
Car 3 (MoHa117-7036)

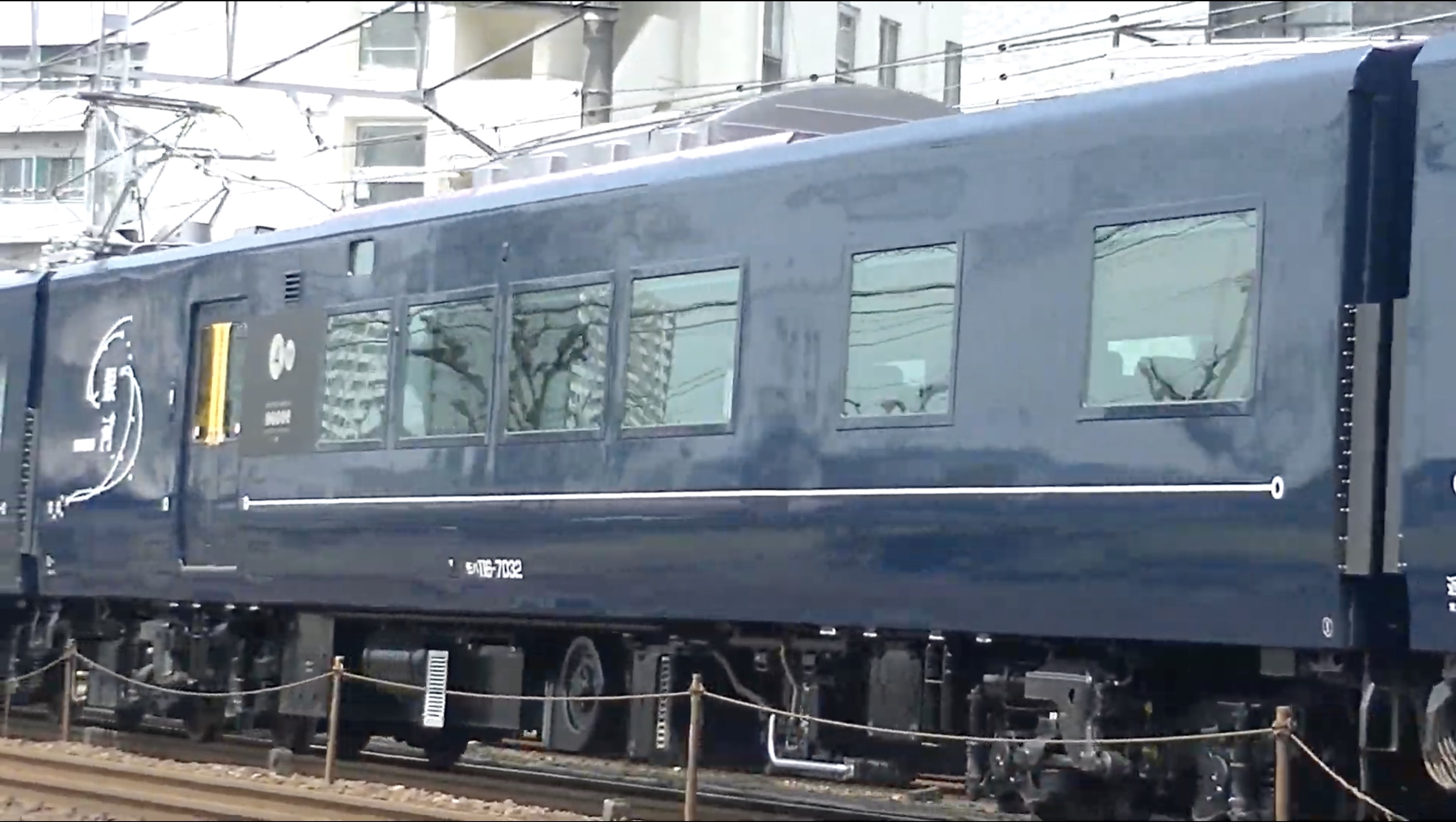
Car 4 (MoHa116-7032)

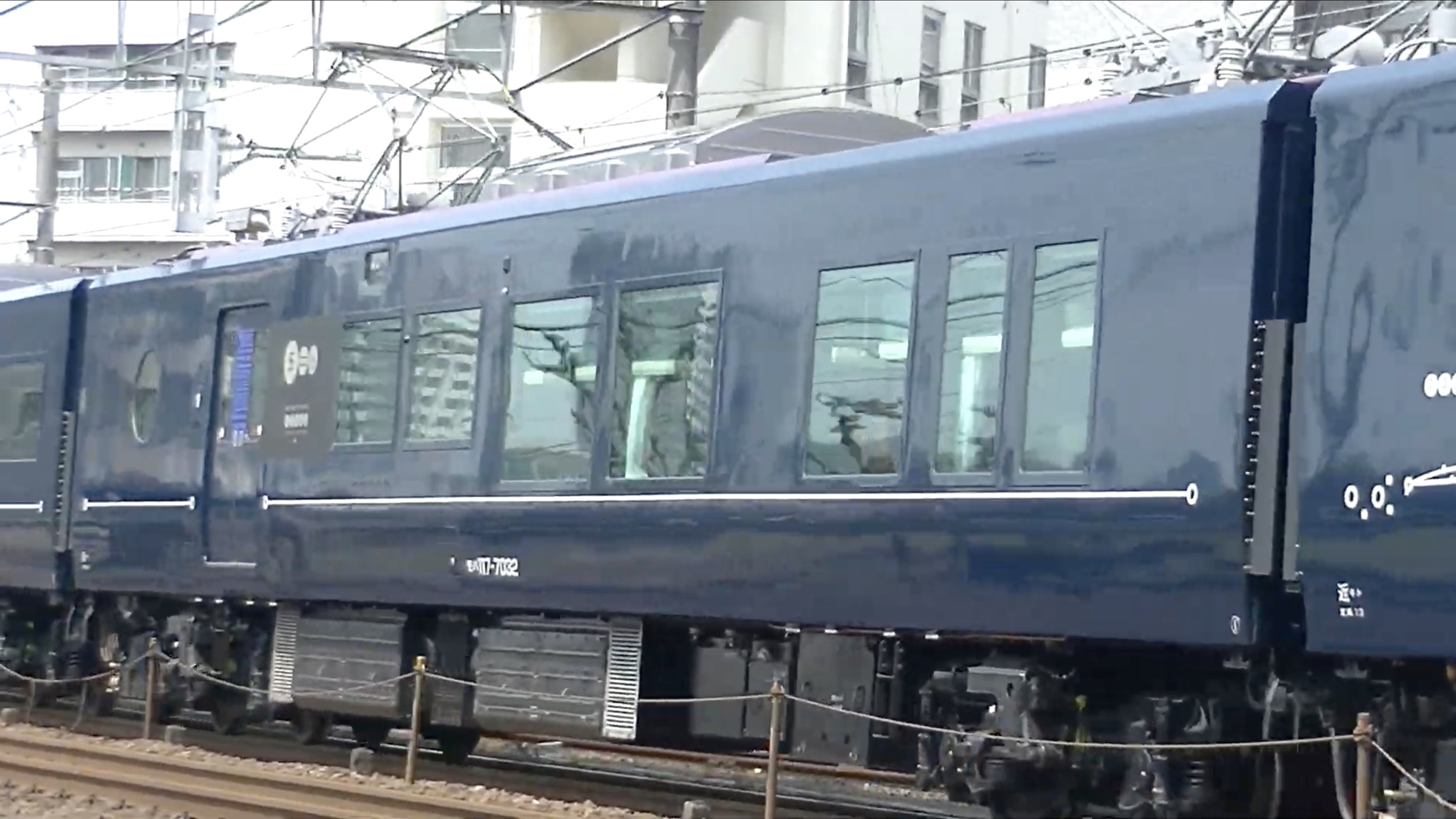
Car 5 (MoHa117-7032)

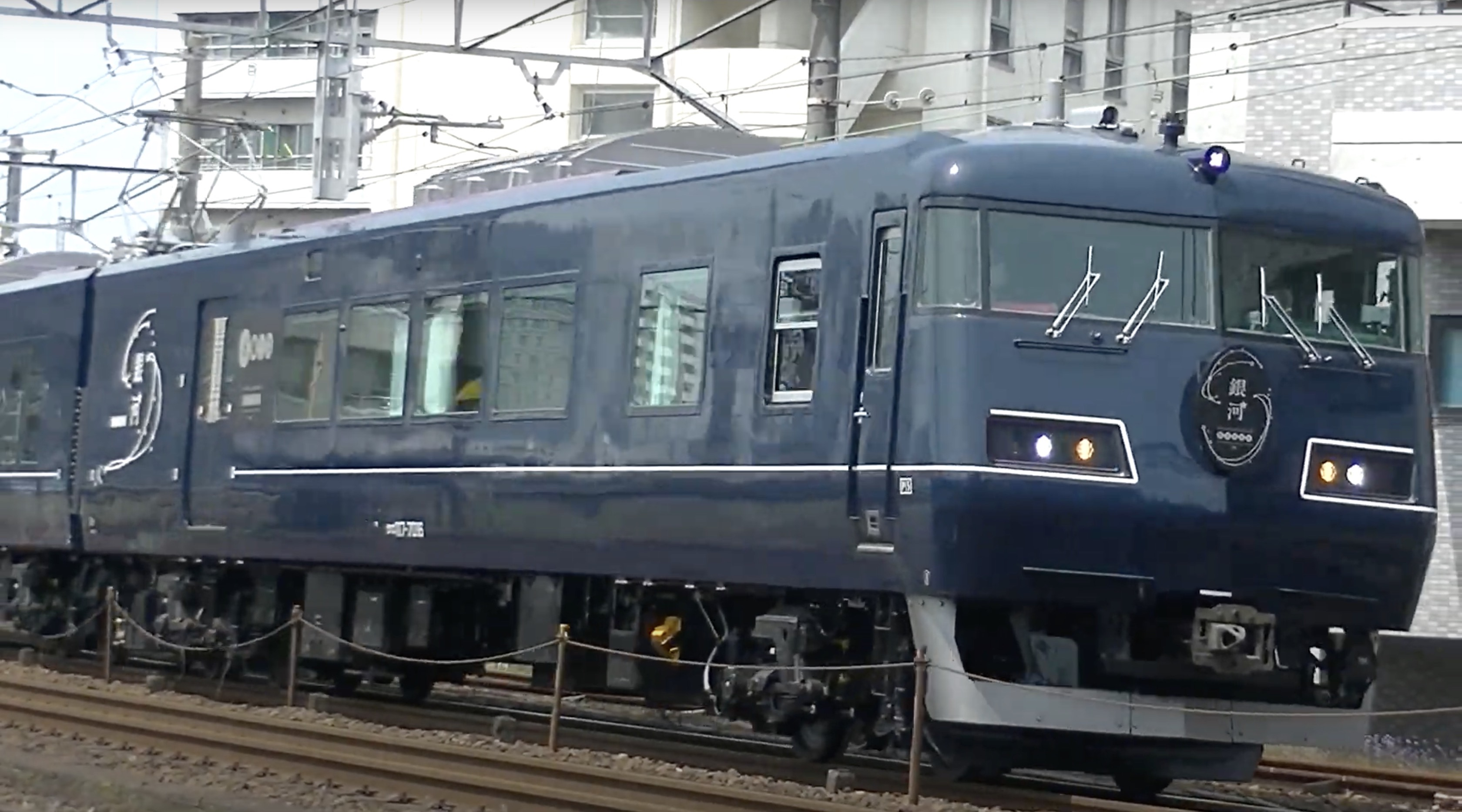
Car 6 (KuHa117-7016)

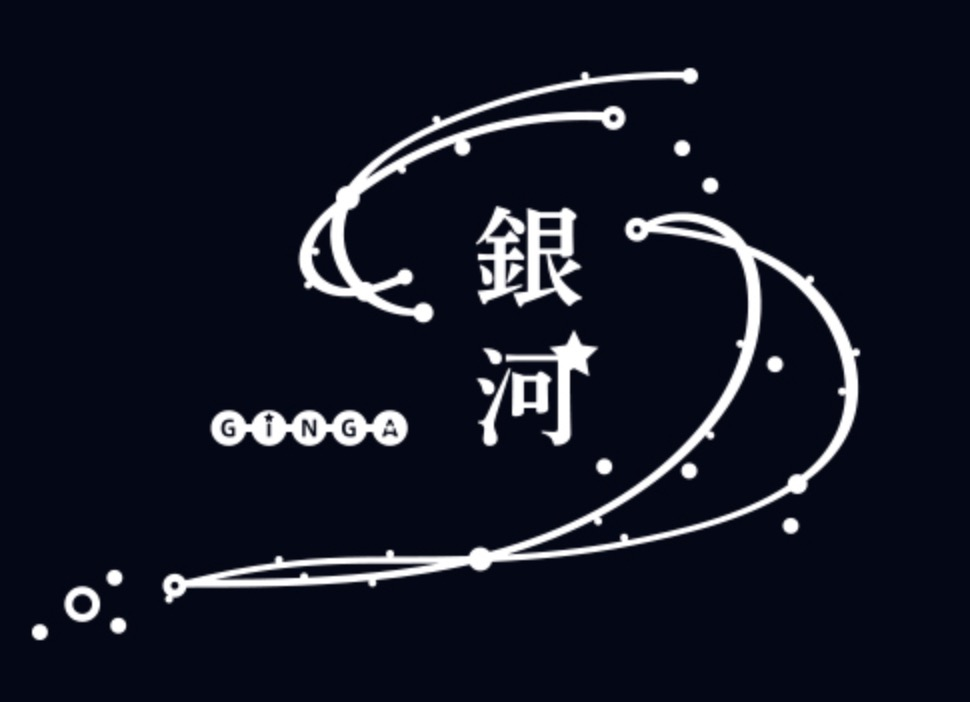
Logo of the WEST EXPRESS Ginga painted on the sides of Cars 1, 4, and 6

== See also ==
- JR West
- Sleeping car
- Blue Train (Japan)
