= Shimosato Station =

Railway station in Wakayama Prefecture, Japan

Shimosato Station 下里駅
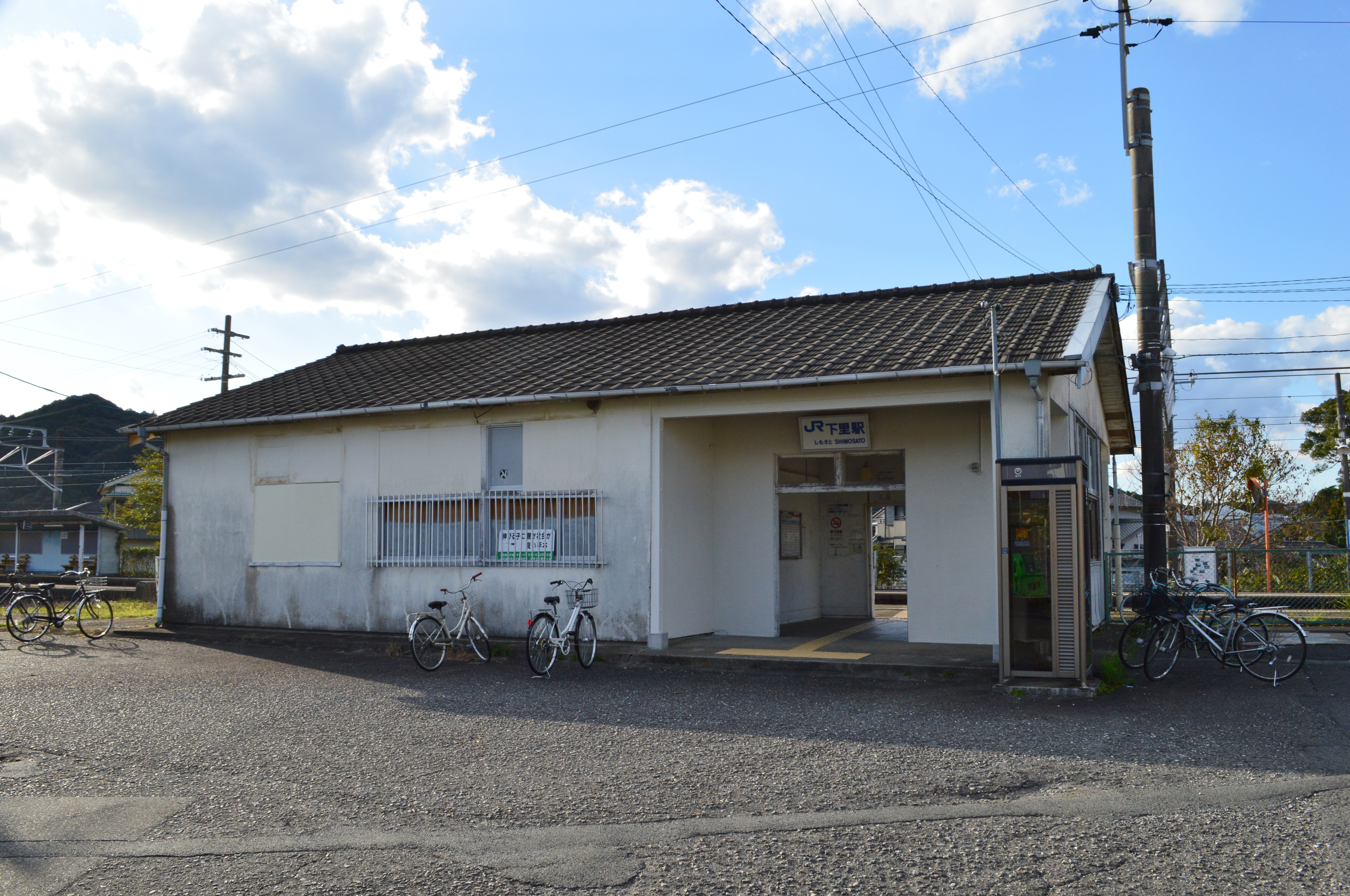
- Shimosato Station, November 2017

General information
- Location: 662, Shimosato, Nachikatsuura-machi, Higashimuro-gun, Wakayama-ken 649-5142; Japan
- Coordinates: 33°34′56.65″N 135°55′20.47″E
- System: JR-West commuter rail station
- Owner: West Japan Railway Company
- Operator: West Japan Railway Company
- Line: W Kisei Main Line (Kinokuni Line)
- Distance: 201.1 km (125.0 miles) from Kameyama; 20.9 km (13.0 miles) from Shingū
- Platforms: 2 side platform
- Tracks: 2
- Train operators: West Japan Railway Company

Construction
- Structure type: At grade
- Accessible: None

Other information
- Status: Unstaffed
- Website: Official website

History
- Opened: 18 July 1935
- Electrified: 1978

Passengers
- FY2019: 72 daily
Services
Preceding station	JR-West	Following station
W Kisei Main Line (Kinokuni Line)
Taiji; Toward Kii-Katsuura and Shingū	Local	Kii-Uragami; Toward Kushimoto, Kii-Tanabe and Wakayama
Location
- Location within Wakayama Prefecture Location within Japan

Shimosato Station (下里駅, Shimosato-eki) is a passenger railway station located in the town of Nachikatsuura, Higashimuro District, Wakayama Prefecture, Japan, operated by West Japan Railway Company (JR West).

== Lines ==
Shimosato Station is served by the Kisei Main Line (Kinokuni Line), and is located 201.1 kilometers from the terminus of the line at Kameyama Station and 20.9 kilometers from Shingū.

== Station layout ==
The station consists of a two opposed side platforms connected by a footbridge. The station is unattended.

=== Platforms ===
1	■ W Kisei Main Line (Kinokuni Line)	for Kushimoto, Kii-Tanabe, and Wakayama
2	■ W Kisei Main Line (Kinokuni Line)	for Kii-Katsuura and Shingū

== Adjacent stations ==
«	Service	»
West Japan Railway Company (JR West)
Kisei Main Line
Limited Express Kuroshio: Does not stop at this station
Taiji	Local	Kii-Uragami

== History ==
Shimosato Station opened on July 18, 1935. With the privatization of the Japan National Railways (JNR) on April 1, 1987, the station came under the aegis of the West Japan Railway Company.

== Passenger statistics ==
In fiscal 2019, the station was used by an average of 72 passengers daily (boarding passengers only).

== Surrounding Area ==
- Shimosato Kofun (National Historic Site)
- Tamanoura beach
- Nachikatsuura Town Hall Shimosato Branch Office
- Shimosato Waterway Observatory, Maritime Security Headquarters, 5th Division
- Nachikatsuura Municipal Shimosato Junior High School
- Nachikatsuura Municipal Shimosato Elementary School

== See also ==
- List of railway stations in Japan
