= Kii-Uragami Station =

Railway station in Nachikatsuura, Wakayama Prefecture, Japan

Kii-Uragami Station 紀伊浦神駅
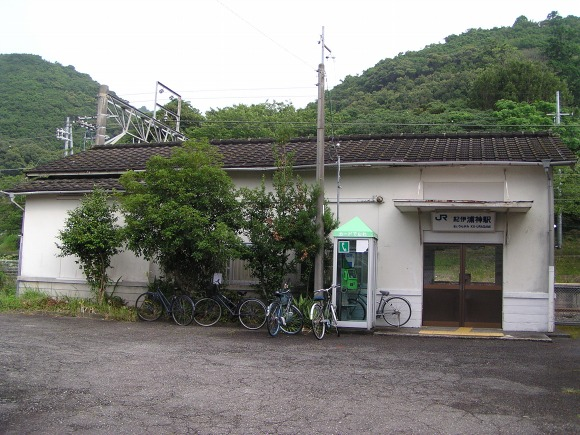
- Kii-Uragami Station, August 2005

General information
- Location: 375-6, Uragami, Nachikatsuura-machi, Higashimuro-gun, Wakayama-ken 649-5145; Japan
- Coordinates: 33°33′37.23″N 135°53′37.9″E
- System: JR-West commuter rail station
- Owner: West Japan Railway Company
- Operator: West Japan Railway Company
- Line: W Kisei Main Line (Kinokuni Line)
- Distance: 205.0 km (127.4 miles) from Kameyama; 24.8 km (15.4 miles) from Shingū
- Platforms: 1 side platform
- Tracks: 2
- Train operators: West Japan Railway Company

Construction
- Structure type: At grade
- Accessible: None

Other information
- Status: Unstaffed
- Website: Official website

History
- Opened: 11 December 1936
- Electrified: 1978

Passengers
- FY2019: 9 daily
Services
Preceding station	JR-West	Following station
W Kisei Main Line (Kinokuni Line)
Shimosato; Toward Kii-Katsuura and Shingū	Local	Kii-Tahara; Toward Kushimoto, Kii-Tanabe and Wakayama
Location
- Location within Wakayama Prefecture Location within Japan

Kii-Uragami Station (紀伊浦神駅, Kii-Uragami-eki) is a passenger railway station in located in the town of Nachikatsuura, Higashimuro District, Wakayama Prefecture, Japan, operated by West Japan Railway Company (JR West).

== Lines ==
Kii-Uragami Station is served by the Kisei Main Line (Kinokuni Line), and is located 205.5 kilometers from the terminus of the line at Kameyama Station and 24.8 kilometers from Shingū.

== Station layout ==
The station consists of one island platform connected go the station building by a level crossing. The station is unattended.

=== Platforms ===
1	■ W Kisei Main Line (Kinokuni Line)	for Kushimoto, Kii-Tanabe, and Wakayama
2	■ W Kisei Main Line (Kinokuni Line)	for Kii-Katsuura and Shingū

== Adjacent stations ==
«	Service	»
West Japan Railway Company (JR West)
Kisei Main Line
Limited Express Kuroshio: Does not stop at this station
Shimosato	Local	Kii-Tahara

== History ==
Kii-Uragami Station opened on December 11, 1936. With the privatization of the Japan National Railways (JNR) on April 1, 1987, the station came under the aegis of the West Japan Railway Company.

== Passenger statistics ==
In fiscal 2019, the station was used by an average of 9 passengers daily (boarding passengers only).

== Surrounding Area ==
- Tamanoura fishing village
- Japan National Route 42

== See also ==
- List of railway stations in Japan
