= Kii-Tahara Station =

Railway station in Kushimoto, Wakayama Prefecture, Japan

Kii-Tahara Station 紀伊田原駅
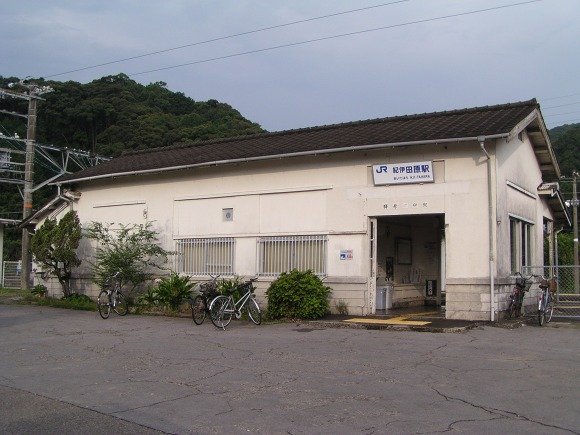
- Kii-Tahara Station

General information
- Location: 219, Tahara, Kushimoto-cho, Higashimuro-gun, Wakayama-ken 649-4112; Japan
- Coordinates: 33°32′11.55″N 135°52′5.59″E
- System: JR-West commuter rail station
- Owner: West Japan Railway Company
- Operator: West Japan Railway Company
- Line: W Kisei Main Line (Kinokuni Line)
- Distance: 209.0 km (129.9 miles) from Kameyama; 28.8 km (17.9 miles) from Shingū
- Platforms: 2 side platform
- Tracks: 3
- Train operators: West Japan Railway Company

Construction
- Structure type: At grade
- Accessible: None

Other information
- Status: Unstaffed
- Website: Official website

History
- Opened: 11 December 1936
- Electrified: 1978

Passengers
- FY2019: 14 daily
Services
Preceding station	JR-West	Following station
W Kisei Main Line (Kinokuni Line)
Kii-Uragami; Toward Kii-Katsuura and Shingū	Local	Koza; Toward Kushimoto, Kii-Tanabe and Wakayama
Location
- Location within Wakayama Prefecture Location within Japan

Kii-Tahara Station (紀伊田原駅, Kii-Tahara-eki) is a passenger railway station in located in the town of Kushimoto, Higashimuro District, Wakayama Prefecture, Japan, operated by West Japan Railway Company (JR West).

== Lines ==
Kii-Tahara Station is served by the Kisei Main Line (Kinokuni Line), and is located 209.0 kilometers from the terminus of the line at Kameyama Station and 28.8 kilometers from Shingū.

== Station layout ==
The station consists of one side platform and one island platform connected by a footbridge. The station is unattended.

=== Platforms ===
1	■ W Kisei Main Line (Kinokuni Line)	for Kushimoto, Kii-Tanabe, and Wakayama
2,3	■ W Kisei Main Line (Kinokuni Line)	for Kii-Katsuura and Shingū

== History ==
Kii-Tahara Station opened on December 11, 1936. With the privatization of the Japan National Railways (JNR) on April 1, 1987, the station came under the aegis of the West Japan Railway Company.

== Passenger statistics ==
In fiscal 2019, the station was used by an average of 14 passengers daily (boarding passengers only).

== Surrounding Area ==
- Kushimoto Town Tahara Elementary School
- Konoha Shrine
- Tawara beach

== See also ==
- List of railway stations in Japan
