= Yukawa Station =

Railway station in Nachikatsuura, Wakayama Prefecture, Japan

Coordinates: 33°36′34.26″N 135°55′29.66″E

Yukawa Station 湯川駅
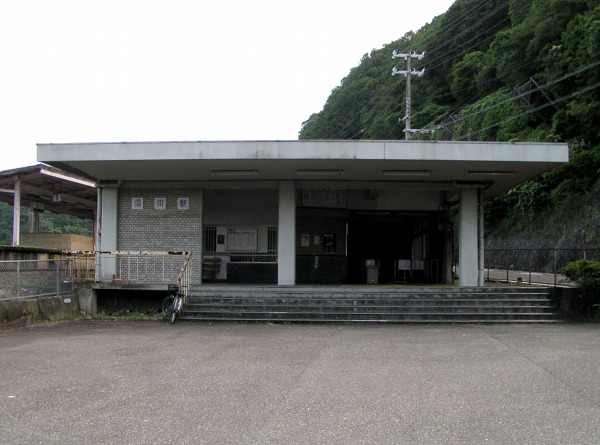
- Yukawa Station, August 2005

General information
- Location: 1596, Nikō, Nachikatsuura Town, Higashimuro District, Wakayama Prefecture 649-5338; Japan
- Operator: JR West
- Line: W Kinokuni Line (Kisei Line)
- Distance: 197.8 km (122.9 miles) from Kameyama; 17.6 km (10.9 miles) from Shingū
- Platforms: 1 island platform
- Tracks: 2

Construction
- Structure type: At grade
- Accessible: None

Other information
- Status: Unstaffed
- Website: Official website

History
- Opened: 18 July 1935; 91 years ago
- Electrified: 1978

Passengers
- FY2019: 6 daily

Services
Preceding station	JR West	Following station
Taiji towards Wakayama	Kinokuni Line Local	Kii-Katsuura towards Shingū
Location
- Location within Wakayama Prefecture Location within Kansai region Location within Japan

Yukawa Station (湯川駅, Yukawa-eki) is a passenger railway station in located in the town of Nachikatsuura, Higashimuro District, Wakayama Prefecture, Japan, operated by West Japan Railway Company (JR West).

== Lines ==
Yukawa Station is served by the Kisei Main Line (Kinokuni Line), and is located 197.8 kilometers from the terminus of the line at Kameyama Station and 17.6 kilometers from Shingū.

== Station layout ==
The station consists of a single island platform connected to the station building by a level crossing. The station is unattended.

=== Platforms ===
1	■ W Kisei Main Line (Kinokuni Line)	for Kii-Katsuura and Shingū
2	■ W Kisei Main Line (Kinokuni Line)	for Kushimoto, Kii-Tanabe, and Wakayama

== History ==
Yukawa Station was opened on July 18, 1935. With the privatization of the Japan National Railways (JNR) on April 1, 1987, the station came under the aegis of the West Japan Railway Company.

== Passenger statistics ==
In fiscal 2019, the station was used by an average of 6 passengers daily (boarding passengers only).

== Surrounding Area ==
- Yukawa Beach
- Yukawa Onsen
- Natsuyama Onsen
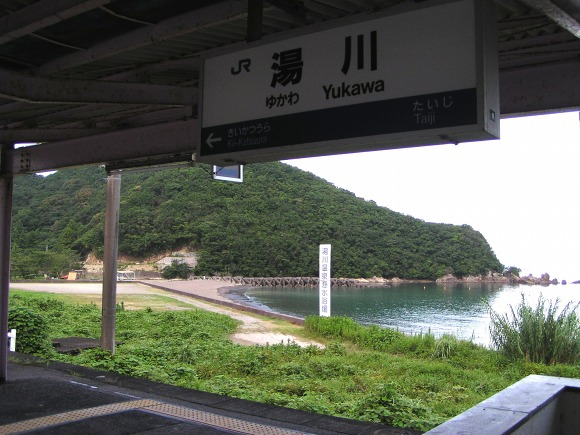
Yukawa Beach, August 2005

== See also ==
- List of railway stations in Japan
