= Tanami Station =

Railway station in Kushimoto, Wakayama Prefecture, Japan

Tanami Station 田並駅
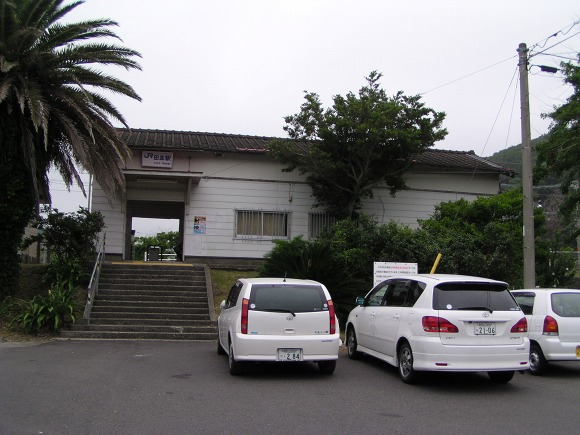
- Tanami Station, August 2005

General information
- Location: 1550, Tanami, Kushimoto-cho, Higashimuro-gun, Wakayama-ken 649-3515; Japan
- Coordinates: 33°29′16.66″N 135°43′7.89″E
- System: JR-West commuter rail station
- Owner: West Japan Railway Company
- Operator: West Japan Railway Company
- Line: W Kisei Main Line (Kinokuni Line)
- Distance: 229.4 km (142.5 miles) from Kameyama; 49.2 km (30.6 miles) from Shingū
- Platforms: 1 side platform
- Tracks: 2
- Train operators: West Japan Railway Company

Construction
- Structure type: At grade
- Accessible: None

Other information
- Status: Unstaffed
- Website: Official website

History
- Opened: 8 August 1940
- Electrified: 1978

Passengers
- FY2019: 8 daily
Services
Preceding station	JR-West	Following station
W Kisei Main Line (Kinokuni Line)
Kii-Arita; Toward Kushimoto and Shingū	Local	Tako; Toward Kii-Tanabe and Wakayama
Location
- Location within Wakayama Prefecture Location within Japan

Tanami Station (田並駅, Tanami-eki) is a passenger railway station in located in the town of Kushimoto, Higashimuro District, Wakayama Prefecture, Japan, operated by West Japan Railway Company (JR West).

== Lines ==
Tanami Station is served by the Kisei Main Line (Kinokuni Line), and is located 229.4 kilometers from the terminus of the line at Kameyama Station and 49.2 kilometers from Shingū.

== Station layout ==
The station consists of one island platform connected to the station building by a footbridge. The station is unattended.

=== Platforms ===
1	■ W Kisei Main Line (Kinokuni Line)	for Kii-Tanabe and Wakayama
2	■ W Kisei Main Line (Kinokuni Line)	for Kushimoto and Shingū

== Adjacent stations ==
«	Service	»
West Japan Railway Company (JR West)
Kisei Main Line
Limited Express Kuroshio: Does not stop at this station
Kii-Arita	Local	Tako

== History ==
Koza Station opened on August 8, 1940. With the privatization of the Japan National Railways (JNR) on April 1, 1987, the station came under the aegis of the West Japan Railway Company.

== Passenger statistics ==
In fiscal 2019, the station was used by an average of 7 passengers daily (boarding passengers only).

== Surrounding Area ==
- National Route 42
- Kushimoto Municipal Kushimoto Nishi Junior High School

== See also ==
- List of railway stations in Japan
