= Koza Station =

Railway station in Kushimoto, Wakayama Prefecture, Japan

Koza Station 古座駅
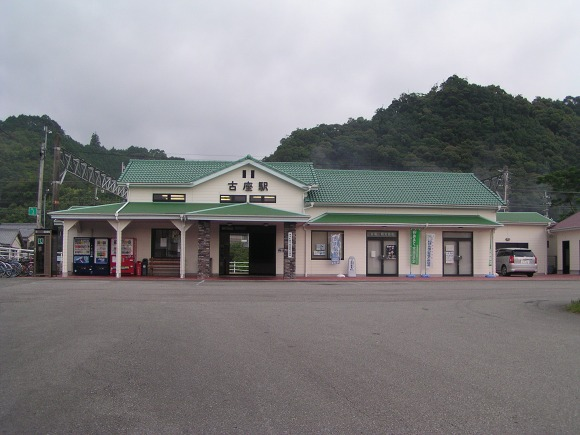
- Koza Station, August 2005

General information
- Location: 232, Nishimukai, Kushimoto-cho, Higashimuro-gun, Wakayama-ken 649-4122; Japan
- Coordinates: 33°31′9.36″N 135°49′15.3″E
- System: JR-West commuter rail station
- Owner: West Japan Railway Company
- Operator: West Japan Railway Company
- Line: W Kisei Main Line (Kinokuni Line)
- Distance: 215.0 km (133.6 miles) from Kameyama; 34.8 km (21.6 miles) from Shingū
- Platforms: 1 side platform
- Tracks: 2
- Train operators: West Japan Railway Company

Construction
- Structure type: At grade
- Accessible: None

Other information
- Status: Unstaffed
- Website: Official website

History
- Opened: 11 December 1936
- Electrified: 1978

Passengers
- FY2019: 124 daily
Services
Preceding station	JR-West	Following station
W Kisei Main Line (Kinokuni Line)
Kii-Tahara; Toward Kii-Katsuura and Shingū	Local	Kii-Hime; Toward Kushimoto and Wakayama
Location
- Location within Wakayama Prefecture Location within Japan

Koza Station (古座駅, Koza-eki) is a passenger railway station in located in the town of Kushimoto, Higashimuro District, Wakayama Prefecture, Japan, operated by West Japan Railway Company (JR West).

== Lines ==
Koza Station is served by the Kisei Main Line (Kinokuni Line), and is located 215.0 kilometers from the terminus of the line at Kameyama Station and 34.8 kilometers from Shingū.

== Station layout ==
The station consists of one island platform connected to the station building by a footbridge. The station is unattended.

=== Platforms ===
1	■ W Kisei Main Line (Kinokuni Line)	for Kushimoto and Wakayama
2	■ W Kisei Main Line (Kinokuni Line)	for Kii-Katsuura and Shingū

== Adjacent stations ==
«	Service	»
West Japan Railway Company (JR West)
Kisei Main Line
Taiji (One-way Operation)	West Express Ginga	Kushimoto
Taiji	Limited Express Kuroshio	Kushimoto
Kii-Tahara	Local	Kii-Hime

== History ==
Koza Station opened on December 11, 1936. With the privatization of the Japan National Railways (JNR) on April 1, 1987, the station came under the aegis of the West Japan Railway Company.

== Passenger statistics ==
In fiscal 2019, the station was used by an average of 124 passengers daily (boarding passengers only).

== Surrounding Area ==
- Kushimoto Town Hall Koza Branch Office (former Koza Town Hall)
- Kushimoto Municipal Nishimukai Elementary School
- Kushimoto Municipal Koza Elementary School
- Kushimoto Municipal Koza Junior High School

== See also ==
- List of railway stations in Japan
