= Kii-Arita Station =

Railway station in Kushimoto, Wakayama Prefecture, Japan

Kii-Arita Station 紀伊有田駅
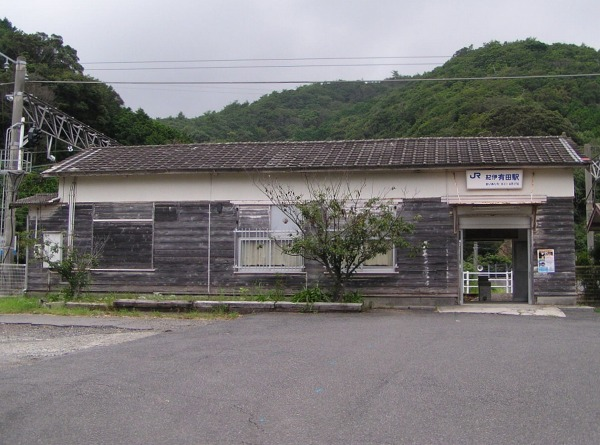
- Kii-Arita Station, August 2005

General information
- Location: 469, Arita, Kushimoto-cho, Higashimuro-gun, Wakayama-ken 649-3514; Japan
- Coordinates: 33°29′27.11″N 135°44′10.24″E
- System: JR-West commuter rail station
- Owner: West Japan Railway Company
- Operator: West Japan Railway Company
- Line: W Kisei Main Line (Kinokuni Line)
- Distance: 227.6 km (141.4 miles) from Kameyama; 47.4 km (29.5 miles) from Shingū
- Platforms: 1 side platform
- Tracks: 2
- Train operators: West Japan Railway Company

Construction
- Structure type: At grade
- Accessible: None

Other information
- Status: Unstaffed
- Website: Official website

History
- Opened: 8 August 1940
- Electrified: 1978

Passengers
- FY2019: 6 daily
Services
| Preceding station | JR-West | Following station |
W Kisei Main Line (Kinokuni Line)
| Kushimoto; Toward Kushimoto and Shingū | Local | Tanami; Toward Kii-Tanabe and Wakayama |
Location
- Location within Wakayama Prefecture Location within Japan

Kii-Arita Station (紀伊有田駅, Kii-Arita-eki) is a passenger railway station in located in the town of Kushimoto, Higashimuro District, Wakayama Prefecture, Japan, operated by West Japan Railway Company (JR West).

== Lines ==
Kii-Arita Station is served by the Kisei Main Line (Kinokuni Line), and is located 227.6 kilometers from the terminus of the line at Kameyama Station and 47.4 kilometers from Shingū.

== Station layout ==
The station consists of one island platform connected to the station building by a crosswalk. The station is unattended.

=== Platforms ===
| 1 | ■ W Kisei Main Line (Kinokuni Line) | for Kii-Tanabe and Wakayama |
| 2 | ■ W Kisei Main Line (Kinokuni Line) | for Kushimoto and Shingū |

== Adjacent stations ==
| « | Service | » |
West Japan Railway Company (JR West)
Kisei Main Line
Limited Express Kuroshio: Does not stop at this station
| Kushimoto | Local | Tanami |

== History ==
Kii-Arita Station opened on August 8, 1940. With the privatization of the Japan National Railways (JNR) on April 1, 1987, the station came under the aegis of the West Japan Railway Company.

== Passenger statistics ==
In fiscal 2019, the station was used by an average of 6 passengers daily (boarding passengers only).

== Surrounding Area ==
- National Route 42
- Kushimoto Municipal Kushimoto Nishi Elementary School
- Kushimoto Marine Park

== See also ==
- List of railway stations in Japan
