= Miwasaki Station =

Railway station in Shingū, Wakayama Prefecture, Japan

Miwasaki Station 三輪崎駅
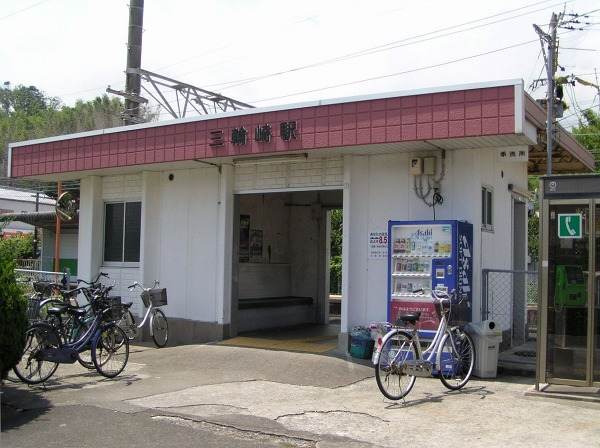
- Miwasaki Station

General information
- Location: 5-30, Miwasaki 1-chome, Shingū-shi, Wakayama-ken 647-0061; Japan
- Coordinates: 33°41′22″N 135°59′06″E
- System: JR-West commuter rail station
- Owner: West Japan Railway Company
- Operator: West Japan Railway Company
- Line: W Kisei Main Line (Kinokuni Line)
- Distance: 184.9 km (114.9 miles) from Kameyama; 4.7 km (2.9 miles) from Shingū
- Platforms: 2 side platform
- Tracks: 2
- Train operators: West Japan Railway Company

Construction
- Structure type: At grade
- Accessible: None

Other information
- Status: Unstaffed
- Website: Official website

History
- Opened: 4 December 1912
- Electrified: 1978

Passengers
- FY2019: 28 daily
Services
Preceding station	JR-West	Following station
W Kisei Main Line (Kinokuni Line)
Shingū; Terminus	Local	Kii-Sano; Toward Kii-Katsuura, Kii-Tanabe and Wakayama
Location
- Location within Wakayama Prefecture Location within Japan

Miwasaki Station (三輪崎駅, Miwasaki-eki) is a passenger railway station in located in the city of Shingū, Wakayama Prefecture, Japan, operated by West Japan Railway Company (JR West).

== Lines ==
Miwasaki Station is served by the Kisei Main Line (Kinokuni Line), and is located 184.9 kilometers from the terminus of the line at Kameyama Station and 4.7 kilometers from Shingū.

== Station layout ==
The station consists of two opposed side platforms connected to the station building by a footbridge. The station is unattended.

=== Platforms ===
1	■ Kisei Main Line	for Kii-Katsuura, Kii-Tanabe and Wakayama
2	■ Kisei Main Line	for Shingū

== Adjacent stations ==
«	Service	»
West Japan Railway Company (JR West)
Kisei Main Line
Limited Express Nanki: Does not stop at this station
Limited Express Kuroshio: Does not stop at this station
Shingū	Local	Kii-Sano

== History ==
Miwasaki Station opened as Miwazaki Station (三輪崎駅) on the Shingu Railway on December 4, 1912. The Shingu Railway was nationalized on July 1, 1934, and the station was renamed "Miwasaki" at that time. With the privatization of the Japan National Railways (JNR) on April 1, 1987, the station came under the aegis of the West Japan Railway Company (JR West).

== Passenger statistics ==
In fiscal 2019, the station was used by an average of 28 passengers daily (boarding passengers only).

== Surrounding Area ==
- National Route 42
- Shingu City Hall Miwasaki Branch
- Shingu City Miwasaki Elementary School
- Shingu City Koyo Junior High School

== See also ==
- List of railway stations in Japan
