= Kii-Temma Station =

Railway station in Nachikatsuura, Wakayama Prefecture, Japan

Coordinates: 33°38′12.13″N 135°56′4.5″E

Kii-Temma Station 紀伊天満駅
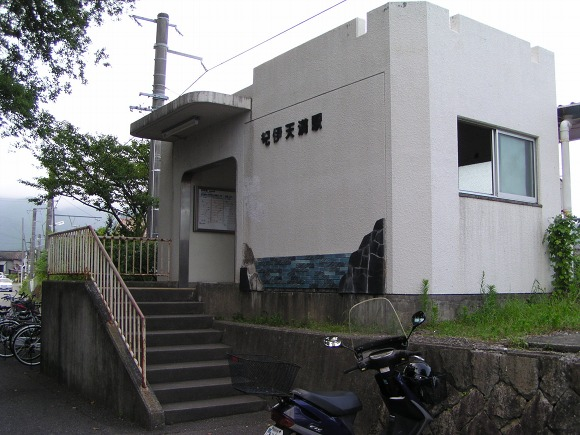
- Kii-Temma Station, August 2005

General information
- Location: 415-3, Temma, Nachikatsuura-machi, Higashimuro-gun, Wakayama-ken 649-5331; Japan
- System: JR-West commuter rail station
- Owner: West Japan Railway Company
- Operator: West Japan Railway Company
- Line: W Kisei Main Line (Kinokuni Line)
- Distance: 193.9 km (120.5 miles) from Kameyama; 13.78 km (8.56 miles) from Shingū
- Platforms: 1 side platform
- Tracks: 1
- Train operators: West Japan Railway Company

Construction
- Structure type: At grade
- Accessible: None

Other information
- Status: Unstaffed
- Website: Official website

History
- Opened: 4 December 1912
- Electrified: 1978
- Former names: Nachiguchi (1912 - 1917); Temma (1917 - 1934)

Passengers
- FY2019: 42 daily

Services
Preceding station	JR West	Following station
Kii-Katsuura towards Wakayama	Kinokuni Line Local	Nachi towards Shingū
Location
- Location within Wakayama Prefecture Location within Japan

Kii-Temma Station (紀伊天満駅, Kii-Temma-eki) is a passenger railway station in located in the town of Nachikatsuura, Higashimuro District, Wakayama Prefecture, Japan, operated by West Japan Railway Company (JR West).

== Lines ==
Kii-Temma Station is served by the Kisei Main Line (Kinokuni Line), and is located 193.9 kilometers from the terminus of the line at Kameyama Station and 13.7 kilometers from Shingū.

== Station layout ==
The station consists of a single side platform serving one bi-directional track. The station is unattended.

== Adjacent stations ==
«	Service	»
West Japan Railway Company (JR West)
Kisei Main Line
Limited Express Nanki: Does not stop at this station
Limited Express Kuroshio: Does not stop at this station
Nachi	Local	Kii-Katsuura

== History ==
Kii-Temma Station opened as Nachiguchi Station (那智口駅) on the Shingu Railway on December 4, 1912. On December 4, 1917, the name was changed to Tenma Station (天満駅) . The Shingu Railway was nationalized on July 1, 1934, at which time the name was changed to its present name. With the privatization of the Japan National Railways (JNR) on April 1, 1987, the station came under the aegis of the West Japan Railway Company.

== Passenger statistics ==
In fiscal 2019, the station was used by an average of 42 passengers daily (boarding passengers only).

== Surrounding Area ==
- Nachi beach
- Nachikatsuura Municipal Nachi Junior High School
- Nachi Tenma Post Office
- Nachikatsuura Town Gymnasium
- Nachikatsuura Town Hot Spring Hospital

== See also ==
- List of railway stations in Japan
