= Streptomyces sulfonofaciens =

Scientific classification
- Domain: Bacteria
- Kingdom: Bacillati
- Phylum: Actinomycetota
- Class: Actinomycetia
- Order: Streptomycetales
- Family: Streptomycetaceae
- Genus: Streptomyces
- Species: S. sulfonofaciens

Binomial name
- Streptomyces sulfonofaciens Miyadoh et al. 1983

Type strain
- ATCC 31892, DSM 41679, IFO 14260, JCM 5069, Kaisha SF-2103, KCC S-1069, LMG 20325, NBRC 14260, NRRL B-16438, SF-2103

Synonyms
- Streptomyces sulfonicifaciens

Species of bacterium

Streptomyces sulfonofaciens is a bacterium species from the genus of Streptomyces which has been isolated from soil in Nachikatsuura from the Wakayama Prefecture in Japan. Streptomyces sulfonofaciens produces the antibiotic pluracidomycin.

== See also ==
- List of Streptomyces species
