= Miyamae Station =

Railway station in Wakayama, Wakayama Prefecture, Japan

Miyamae Station 宮前駅
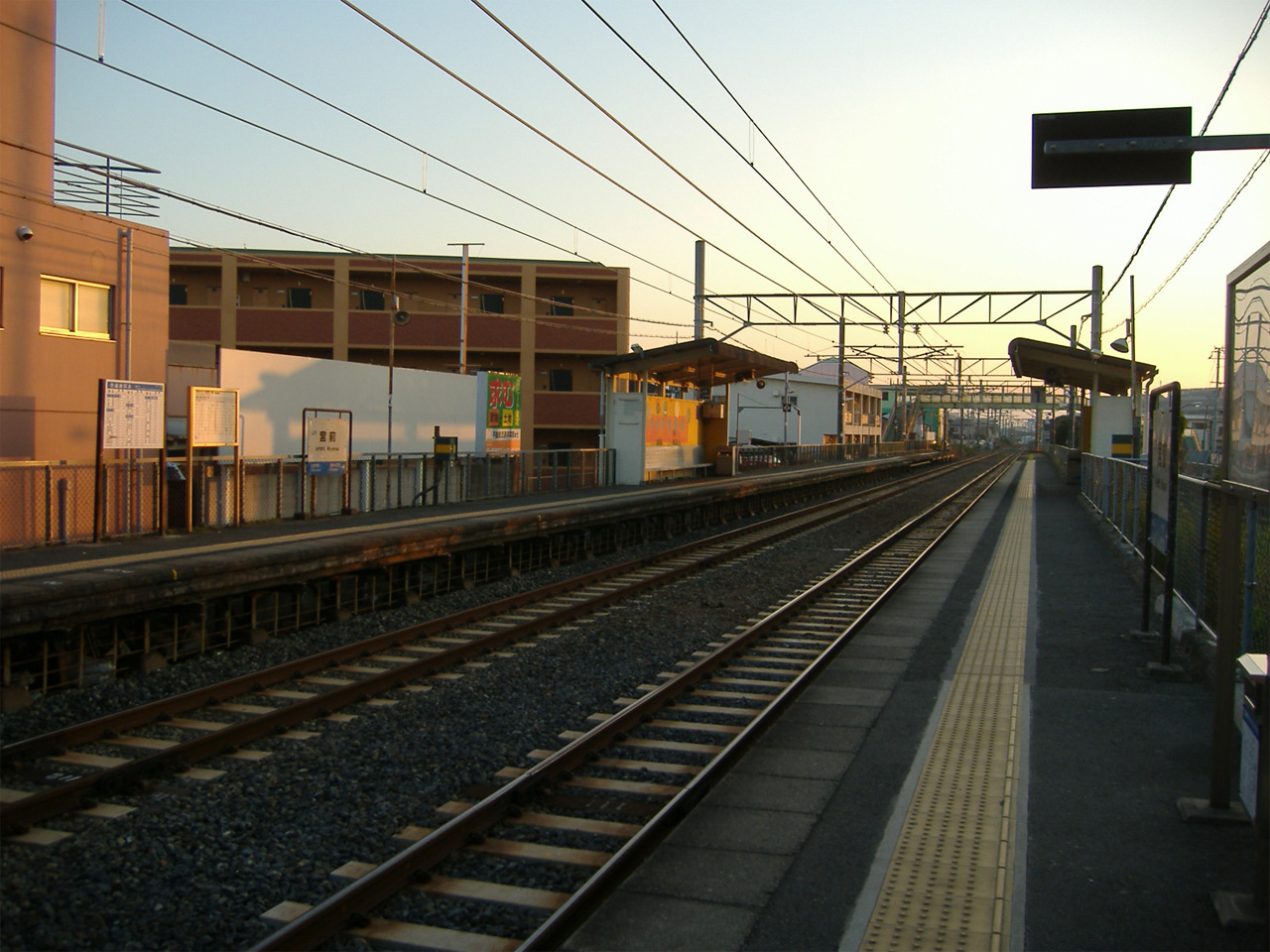
- Miyamae Station, November 2007

General information
- Location: 1-4 Kitanakajima, Wakayama-shi, Wakayama-ken 641-0008; Japan
- Coordinates: 34.2132°N 135.1888°E
- Owner: West Japan Railway Company
- Operator: West Japan Railway Company
- Line: W Kisei Main Line (Kinokuni Line)
- Distance: 378.8 km (235.4 miles) from Kameyama; 198.6 km (123.4 miles) from Shingū
- Platforms: 2 side platforms
- Tracks: 2
- Train operators: West Japan Railway Company

Other information
- Status: Unstaffed
- Website: Official website

History
- Opened: 1 April 1955
- Electrified: 1978

Passengers
- FY2019: 1667 daily
Services
| Preceding station | JR-West | Following station |
W Kisei Main Line (Kinokuni Line)
Limited Express Kuroshio: Does not stop at this station
Rapid: Does not stop at this station
| Kimiidera | Local | Wakayama |
Location
- Location within Wakayama Prefecture Location within Japan

Miyamae Station (宮前駅, Miyamae-eki) is a passenger railway station in located in the city of Wakayama, Wakayama Prefecture, Japan, operated by West Japan Railway Company (JR West).

== Lines ==
Miyamae Station is served by the Kisei Main Line (Kinokuni Line), and is located 378.8 kilometers from the terminus of the line at Kameyama Station and 198.6 kilometers from Shingū.

== Station layout ==
The station consists of two opposed side platforms. There is no station building and no connection between the platforms within the station. The station is unattended.

=== Platforms ===
| 1 | ■ W Kisei Main Line (Kinokuni Line) | for Wakayama and Tennōji |
| 2 | ■ W Kisei Main Line (Kinokuni Line) | for Gobō and Shingū |

== Adjacent stations ==
| « | Service | » |
West Japan Railway Company (JR West)
Kisei Main Line
Limited Express Kuroshio: Does not stop at this station
Rapid: Does not stop at this station
| Kimiidera | Local | Wakayama |

== History ==
Miyamae Station opened on February 15, 1945 as the Miyamae Signal Box (宮前信号場, Miyamae shingō-ba). It was elevated to a full station on April 1, 1955. With the privatization of the Japan National Railways (JNR) on April 1, 1987, the station came under the aegis of the West Japan Railway Company. The current station building was completed in September 2004.

== Passenger statistics ==
In fiscal 2019, the station was used by an average of 1667 passengers daily (boarding passengers only).

== Surrounding Area ==
- Wakayama City Towa Junior High School
- Wakayama City Miyamae Elementary School
- Wakayama Korean Elementary and Intermediate School

== See also ==
- List of railway stations in Japan
