= Kiwa Station (Wakayama) =

Railway station in Wakayama, Wakayama Prefecture, Japan

Kiwa Station 紀和駅
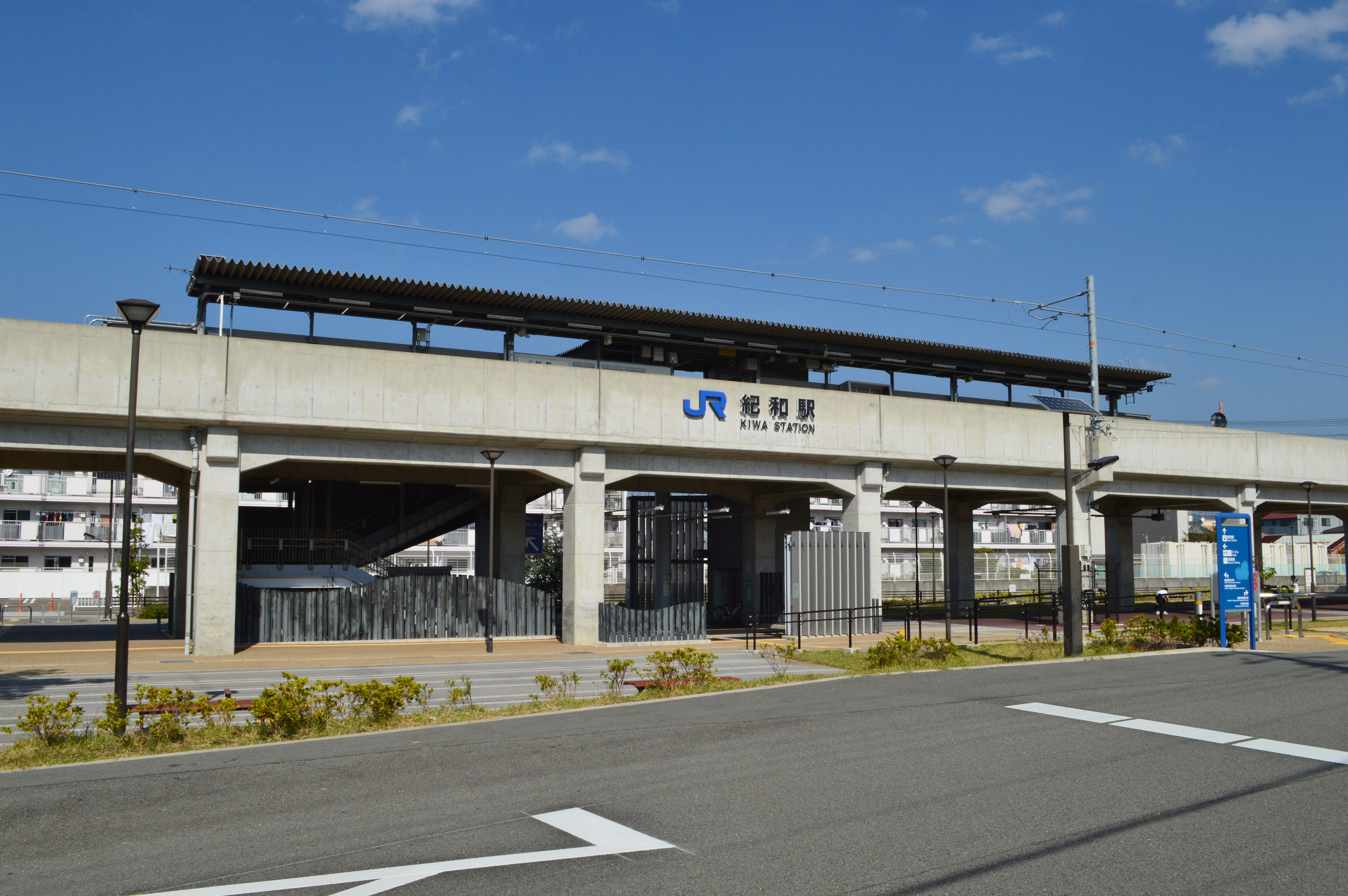
- Kiwa Station in October 2018

General information
- Location: 803-1, Nakanoshima, Wakayama; Wakayama: Japan; （和歌山県和歌山市中之島803-1）
- Coordinates: 34°14′31.2″N 135°10′50.3″E
- System: JR-West commuter rail station
- Owner: JR West
- Operator: JR West
- Line: Kisei Main Line
- Distance: 382.7 km (237.8 miles) from Kameyama; 1.8 km (1.1 miles) from Wakayama
- Platforms: 1 side platform
- Tracks: 1
- Train operators: JR West

Construction
- Structure type: At grade
- Accessible: None

Other information
- Website: http://www.jr-odekake.net/eki/top.php?id=0622098

History
- Opened: 4 May 1898
- Electrified: 1984
- Former names: Wakayama (1898–1968)

Passengers
- 2016: 108 daily

Services
Preceding station	JR West	Following station
Wakayama Terminus	Kinokuni Line	Wakayamashi Terminus
Location

Kiwa Station (紀和駅, Kiwa-eki) is a railway station in Wakayama, Wakayama Prefecture, Japan.

== History ==
The station was opened in 1898 and was the original Wakayama station before Wakayamashi and the modern Wakayama stations were built.

== Lines ==
- West Japan Railway Company (JR West)
  - Kisei Main Line

== Around the station ==
- National Route 42
