= Nachikatsuura =

Nachikatsuura 那智勝浦町
- Town
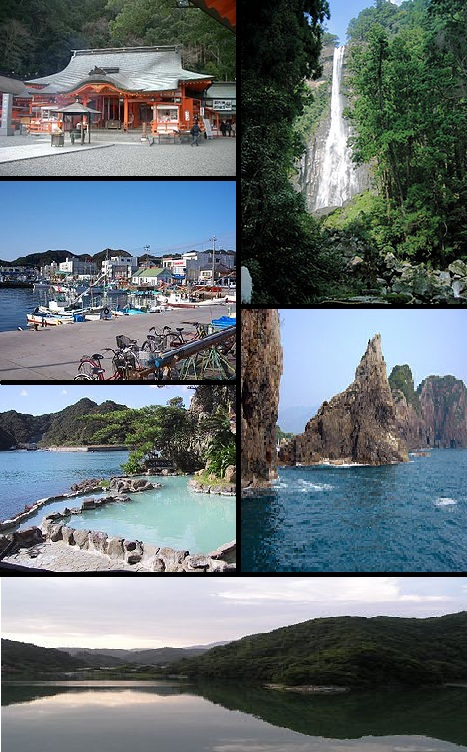
| Kumano Nachi Taisha | Nachi Falls |
Katsuura fishing port
| Nanki-Katsuura Onsen | Kii Matsushima |
Yukashi hot spring
- Flag Seal
- Location of Nachikatsuura in Wakayama Prefecture

- Location in Japan
- Coordinates: 33°38′N 135°56′E
- Country: Japan
- Region: Kansai
- Prefecture: Wakayama
- District: Higashimuro

Government
  - Mayor: Shinichi Teramoto

Area
  - Total: 183.31 km^{2} (70.78 sq mi)

Population (October 31, 2021)
  - Total: 14,420
  - Density: 78.66/km^{2} (203.7/sq mi)
- Time zone: UTC+09:00 (JST)
- City hall address: Oji Tsukiji 7-1-1, Nachikatsuura-cho, Nishimuro-gun, Wakayama-ken 649-53921
- Website: Official website
- Symbols
- Flower: Azalea
- Tree: Live oak

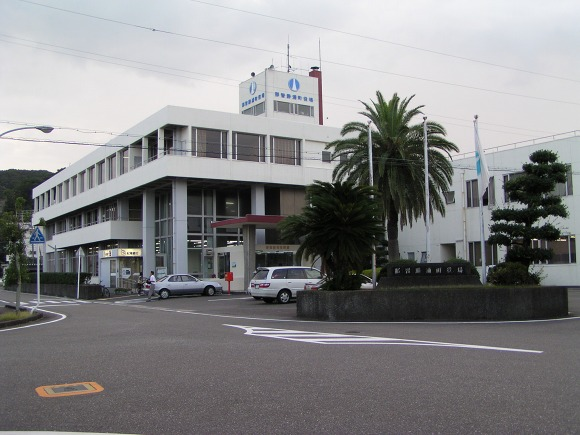
Nachikatsuura town hall

Nachikatsuura (那智勝浦町, Nachikatsuura-chō) is a town located in Higashimuro District, Wakayama Prefecture, Japan. As of 1 November 2021, the town had an estimated population of 14,420 in 7,622 households and a population density of 79 persons per km^{2}. The total area of the town is 183.31 square kilometres (70.78 sq mi).

== Geography ==
Nachikatsuura is located near the southern tip of the Kii Peninsula, in the southeastern tip of Wakayama Prefecture. It faces the Pacific Ocean to the east and its coastline is a typical ria coast with several good natural harbors. In particular, the port of Katsuura is located in a cove protected by the island of Nakanoshima at its entrance, so it is not affected by rough waves from the sea. The landscape is mountainous, with numerous hot springs. Parts of the city are within the limits of the Yoshino-Kumano National Park and are also within the Kumano area of the UNESCO World Heritage Site "Sacred Sites and Pilgrimage Routes in the Kii Mountain Range."

The Irokawafujimi Pass located in the town is the farthest place where you can see Mount Fuji which is around 322 kilometres (200 mi) from the summit.

== Climate ==
Nachikatsuura has a humid subtropical climate (Köppen Cfa) characterized by warm summers and cool winters with light to no snowfall. The average annual temperature in Nachikatsuura is 16.5 °C. The average annual rainfall is 2,596 mm with September as the wettest month. The temperatures are highest on average in August, at around 26.1 °C, and lowest in January, at around 6.8 °C. The area is subject to typhoons in summer.

== Demographics ==
The population of Nachikatsuura has decreased steadily over the past 60 years.

Historical population
| Year | Pop. | ±% |
|---|---|---|
| 1920 | 19,075 | — |
| 1930 | 19,939 | +4.5% |
| 1940 | 21,626 | +8.5% |
| 1950 | 25,151 | +16.3% |
| 1960 | 25,775 | +2.5% |
| 1970 | 23,871 | −7.4% |
| 1980 | 23,006 | −3.6% |
| 1990 | 20,610 | −10.4% |
| 2000 | 19,417 | −5.8% |
| 2010 | 17,082 | −12.0% |

== History ==
The area of the modern town of Nachikatsuura was within the ancient Kii Province. Kumano Nachi Taisha, one of the Kumano Sanzan shrines, has been a destination for pilgrims since the Heian period. The villages of Nachi and Katsuura were established with the creation of the modern municipalities system on April 1, 1889. Katsuura was raised to town status on May 1, 1908, and Nachi on August 1, 1934. On April 1, 1955, Nachi and Katsura merged with the neighboring villages of Ukuimura and Wakamura to form the town of Nachikatsuura. On January 11, 1960, the municipality annexed the villages of Shimosato farther south and Otamura inland up the Ota River.

== Government ==
Nachikatsuura has a mayor-council form of government with a directly elected mayor and a unicameral city council of 10 members. Nachikatsuura contributes – collectively with the other municipalities of Higashimuro District – two members to the Wakayama Prefectural Assembly. In terms of national politics, the town is part of Wakayama 3rd district of the lower house of the Diet of Japan.

== Economy ==
The economy of Nachikatsuura centers on commercial fishing, agriculture, and tourism.

== Education ==
Nachikatsuura has seven public elementary schools and four public middle schools operated by the town government. The town does not have a high school. Kinki University's Fisheries Research Institute, Uragami Experiment Station and its Aquatic Culture Seedling Center are located in Nachikatsuura.

== Transportation ==
=== Railway ===
JR West – Kisei Main Line

- Ukui - Nachi - Kii-Temma - Kii-Katsuura - Yukawa - <Taiji> - Shimosato - Kii-Uragami

=== Highways ===
- Nachikatsuura-Shingū Road
- National Route 42

== Local attractions ==
- Fudarakusan-ji
- Kumano Kodō
- Kumano Nachi Taisha
- Nachi Falls
- Nanki-Katsuura Onsen
- Seiganto-ji
- Shimosato Kofun
