= Taiji Station =

Railway station in Taiji, Wakayama Prefecture, Japan

Taiji Station 太地駅
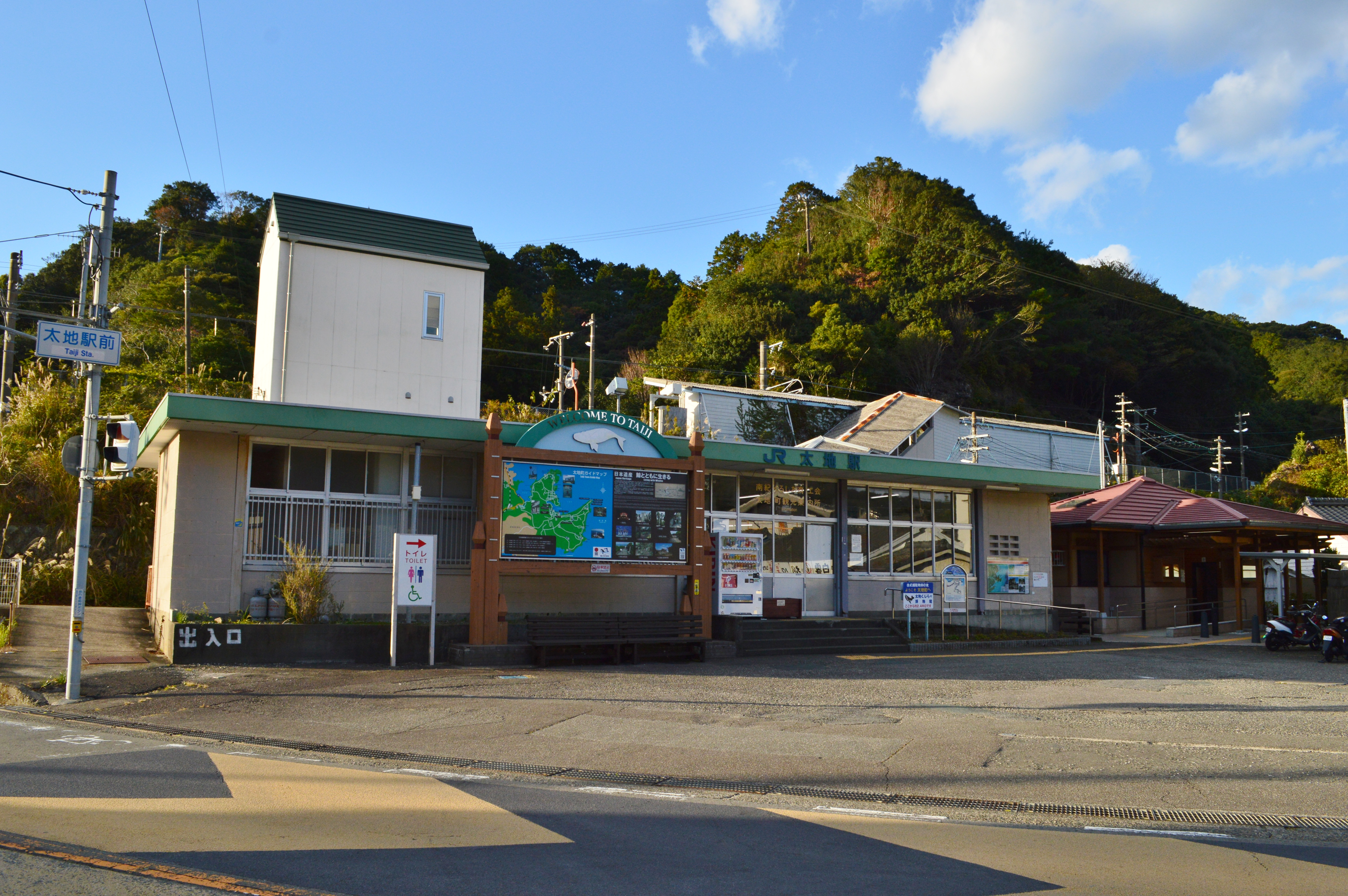
- Taiji Station

General information
- Location: 248-1, Moriura, Taiji Town, Higashimuro District, Wakayama Prefecture 649-5172; Japan
- Coordinates: 33°35′28.27″N 135°55′38.77″E
- Operator: JR West
- Line: W Kinokuni Line (Kinokuni Line)
- Distance: 199.9 km (124.2 miles) from Kameyama; 19.7 km (12.2 miles) from Shingū
- Platforms: 1 side platform
- Tracks: 1
- Bus stands: yes

Construction
- Structure type: At grade
- Accessible: None

Other information
- Status: Unstaffed
- Website: Official website

History
- Opened: 18 July 1935; 91 years ago
- Electrified: 1978

Passengers
- FY2019: 99 daily

Services
Preceding station	JR West	Following station
Shimosato towards Wakayama	Kinokuni Line Local	Yukawa towards Shingū
Koza towards Kyoto	Kinokuni Line Kuroshio	Kii-Katsuura towards Shingū
Koza towards Kyoto	Kinokuni Line Kyōto bound trains only West Express Ginga	Kii-Katsuura towards Shingū
Location
- Location within Wakayama Prefecture Location within Kansai region Location within Japan

Taiji Station (太地駅, Taiji-eki) is a passenger railway station located in the town of Taiji, Higashimuro District, Wakayama Prefecture, Japan, operated by West Japan Railway Company (JR West).

== Lines ==
Taiji Station is served by the Kisei Main Line (Kinokuni Line), and is located 199.9 kilometers from the terminus of the line at Kameyama Station and 19.7 kilometers from Shingū.

== Station layout ==
The station consists of one side platform serving a single bi-directional track. The platform is located high on an embankment and is connected by stairs to the station building. The station is unattended.

== History ==
Taiji Station opened on July 18, 1935. With the privatization of the Japan National Railways (JNR) on April 1, 1987, the station came under the aegis of the West Japan Railway Company.

== Passenger statistics ==
In fiscal 2019, the station was used by an average of 99 passengers daily (boarding passengers only).

== Surrounding Area ==
- Roadside station Taiji
- Taiji Municipal Parking Lot
- Taiji Town Hall
- Taiji Elementary School

== See also ==
- List of railway stations in Japan
