= Kisei Main Line =

Railway line in Japan

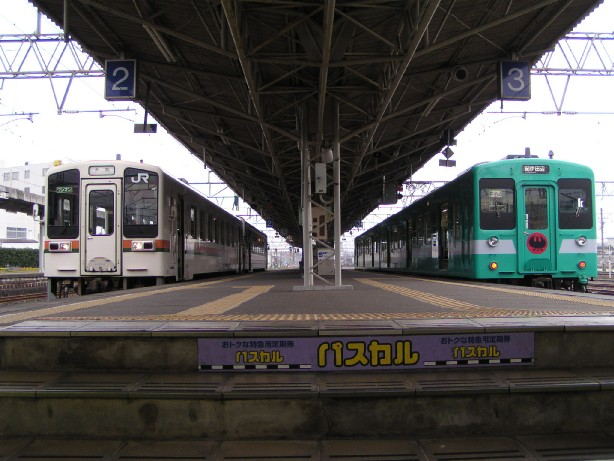
- JR Central (left) and JR West (right) trains meet at the boundary, Shingū Station

Overview
- Other name: Kinokuni Line (JR West: Shingū–Wakayama)
- Native name: 紀勢本線
- Status: In operation
- Owner: JR Central, JR West, Nankai Electric Railway
- Locale: Mie Prefecture, Wakayama Prefecture
- Termini: Kameyama; Wakayamashi
- Stations: 96

Service
- Type: Heavy rail
- System: Urban Network (Wakayama–Wakayamashi)
- Operator(s): JR Central, JR West, JR Freight
- Rolling stock: JR Central: KiHa 25 series, KiHa 75 series DMU, HC85 series DEMU; JR West: 283 series, 287 series, 289 series, 223 series, 225 series, 227 series EMU

History
- Opened: 21 August 1891; 135 years ago

Technical
- Line length: 384.2 km (238.7 mi)
- Number of tracks: Single track and double track sections
- Character: Both urban and rural
- Track gauge: 1,067 mm (3 ft 6 in)
- Electrification: None (Kameyama-Shingū); 1,500 V DC (Shingū–Wakayamashi)
- Operating speed: 110 km/h (68 mph)
Route map
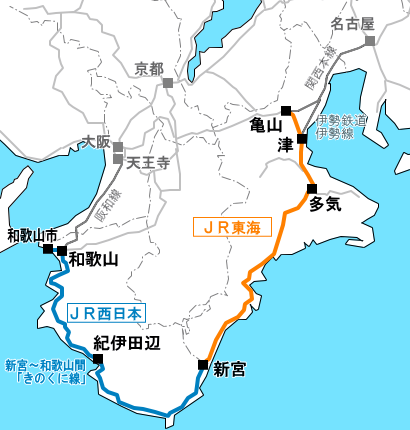

The Kisei Main Line (紀勢本線, Kisei-honsen) is a railway line that parallels the coastline of the Kii Peninsula in Japan between Mie Prefecture and Wakayama Prefecture. The name takes the kanji characters from the names of the old provinces of Kii (紀伊) and Ise (伊勢).

The line is operated by Central Japan Railway Company (JR Central) from Kameyama, the eastern terminus, to Shingū, and by West Japan Railway Company (JR West) from Shingū to Wakayamashi, the western terminus. The segment between Shingū and Wakayama is nicknamed as the Kinokuni Line (きのくに線), after the alternate name of the Kii Province.

The line has connections with through service, to the Kansai Main Line for Nagoya via the Ise Railway, and to the Hanwa Line at Wakayama for Osaka.

== Services ==
The Nanki limited express runs between Nagoya and Shingū or Kii-Katsuura with 4 return workings a day via the Ise Railway. The Kuroshio limited express runs between Kyoto/Shin-Ōsaka/Tennōji and Shingū with 15 return workings a day.

The line is generally divided to four parts for local services, by Shingū, Kii-Tanabe, Gobō, and Wakayama.

== Stations ==
=== Kameyama to Shingū (JR Central) ===
Station	Japanese	Distance (km)	Transfers	Location	
Kameyama	亀山	0.0	Kansai Main Line	Kameyama	Mie
Shimonoshō	下庄	5.5		Kameyama	Mie
Ishinden	一身田	12.1		Tsu	Mie
Tsu	津	15.5	■ Ise Railway Ise Line (12, some through service from Nagoya); E Kintetsu Nagoya Line (E39)	Tsu	Mie
Akogi	阿漕	19.3		Tsu	Mie
Takachaya	高茶屋	23.4		Tsu	Mie
Rokken	六軒	29.1		Matsusaka	Mie
Matsusaka	松阪	34.6	Meishō Line (some through service from Ise-Okitsu); M Kintetsu Yamada Line (M64)	Matsusaka	Mie
Tokuwa	徳和	37.6		Matsusaka	Mie
Taki	多気	42.5	Sangū Line (some through service to Iseshi and Toba)	Taki, Taki	Mie
Ōka	相可	46.4		Taki, Taki	Mie
Sana	佐奈	49.6		Taki, Taki	Mie
Tochihara	栃原	55.1		Ōdai, Taki	Mie
Kawazoe	川添	60.8		Ōdai, Taki	Mie
Misedani	三瀬谷	67.9		Ōdai, Taki	Mie
Takihara	滝原	73.0		Ōdai, Taki	Mie
Aso	阿曽	77.1		Taiki, Watarai	Mie
Ise-Kashiwazaki	伊勢柏崎	82.2		Taiki, Watarai	Mie
Ōuchiyama	大内山	86.9		Taiki, Watarai	Mie
Umegadani	梅ヶ谷	89.5		Taiki, Watarai	Mie
Kii-Nagashima	紀伊長島	98.4		Kihoku, Kitamuro	Mie
Minose	三野瀬	105.9		Kihoku, Kitamuro	Mie
Funatsu	船津	112.2		Kihoku, Kitamuro	Mie
Aiga	相賀	116.6		Kihoku, Kitamuro	Mie
Owase	尾鷲	123.3		Owase	Mie
Ōsoneura	大曽根浦	127.4		Owase	Mie
Kuki	九鬼	134.4		Owase	Mie
Mikisato	三木里	138.5		Owase	Mie
Kata	賀田	142.6		Owase	Mie
Nigishima	二木島	146.8		Kumano	Mie
Atashika	新鹿	150.8		Kumano	Mie
Hadasu	波田須	153.2		Kumano	Mie
Ōdomari	大泊	155.2		Kumano	Mie
Kumanoshi	熊野市	157.6		Kumano	Mie
Arii	有井	159.6		Kumano	Mie
Kōshiyama	神志山	164.1		Mihama, Minamimuro	Mie
Kii-Ichigi	紀伊市木	165.6		Mihama, Minamimuro	Mie
Atawa	阿田和	168.4		Mihama, Minamimuro	Mie
Kii-Ida	紀伊井田	173.8		Kihō, Minamimuro	Mie
Udono	鵜殿	176.6		Kihō, Minamimuro	Mie
Shingū	新宮	180.2		Shingū	Wakayama

=== Shingū to Wakayama (JR West) ===
Station	Japanese	Distance (km)	Transfers	Location	
Shingū	新宮	180.2		Shingū	Wakayama
Miwasaki	三輪崎	184.9		Shingū	Wakayama
Kii-Sano	紀伊佐野	186.6		Shingū	Wakayama
Ukui	宇久井	188.7		Nachikatsuura, Higashimuro	Wakayama
Nachi	那智	193.0		Nachikatsuura, Higashimuro	Wakayama
Kii-Temma	紀伊天満	193.9		Nachikatsuura, Higashimuro	Wakayama
Kii-Katsuura	紀伊勝浦	195.1		Nachikatsuura, Higashimuro	Wakayama
Yukawa	湯川	197.8		Nachikatsuura, Higashimuro	Wakayama
Taiji	太地	199.9		Taiji, Higashimuro	Wakayama
Shimosato	下里	201.1		Nachikatsuura, Higashimuro	Wakayama
Kii-Uragami	紀伊浦神	205.0		Nachikatsuura, Higashimuro	Wakayama
Kii-Tahara	紀伊田原	209.9		Kushimoto, Higashimuro	Wakayama
Koza	古座	215.0		Kushimoto, Higashimuro	Wakayama
Kii-Hime	紀伊姫	218.9		Kushimoto, Higashimuro	Wakayama
Kushimoto	串本	221.8		Kushimoto, Higashimuro	Wakayama
Kii-Arita	紀伊有田	227.6		Kushimoto, Higashimuro	Wakayama
Tanami	田並	229.4		Kushimoto, Higashimuro	Wakayama
Tako	田子	233.7		Kushimoto, Higashimuro	Wakayama
Wabuka	和深	236.4		Kushimoto, Higashimuro	Wakayama
Esumi	江住	242.0		Susami, Nishimuro	Wakayama
Mirozu	見老津	245.0		Susami, Nishimuro	Wakayama
Susami	周参見	254.0		Susami, Nishimuro	Wakayama
Kii-Hiki	紀伊日置	261.2		Shirahama, Nishimuro	Wakayama
Tsubaki	椿	267.3		Shirahama, Nishimuro	Wakayama
Kii-Tonda	紀伊富田	272.5		Shirahama, Nishimuro	Wakayama
Shirahama	白浜	275.4		Shirahama, Nishimuro	Wakayama
Asso	朝来	279.7		Kamitonda, Nishimuro	Wakayama
Kii-Shinjō	紀伊新庄	283.2		Tanabe	Wakayama
Kii-Tanabe	紀伊田辺	285.4		Tanabe	Wakayama
Haya	芳養	289.5		Tanabe	Wakayama
Minabe	南部	294.5		Minabe, Hidaka	Wakayama
Iwashiro	岩代	299.6		Minabe, Hidaka	Wakayama
Kirime	切目	305.5		Inami, Hidaka	Wakayama
Inami	印南	309.3		Inami, Hidaka	Wakayama
Inahara	稲原	313.6		Inami, Hidaka	Wakayama
Wasa	和佐	320.4		Hidakagawa, Hidaka	Wakayama
Dōjōji	道成寺	324.7		Gobō	Wakayama
Gobō	御坊	326.3	Kishū Railway Line	Gobō	Wakayama
Kii-Uchihara	紀伊内原	329.2		Hidaka, Hidaka	Wakayama
Kii-Yura	紀伊由良	334.5		Yura, Hidaka	Wakayama
Hirokawa Beach	広川ビーチ	341.3		Hirogawa, Arida	Wakayama
Yuasa	湯浅	343.9		Yuasa, Arida	Wakayama
Fujinami	藤並	347.3		Aridagawa, Arida	Wakayama
Kii-Miyahara	紀伊宮原	351.2		Arida	Wakayama
Minoshima	箕島	355.6		Arida	Wakayama
Hatsushima	初島	358.1		Arida	Wakayama
Shimotsu	下津	361.1		Kainan	Wakayama
Kamogō	加茂郷	363.8		Kainan	Wakayama
Shimizuura	冷水浦	367.7		Kainan	Wakayama
Kainan	海南	370.5		Kainan	Wakayama
Kuroe	黒江	372.3		Kainan	Wakayama
Kimiidera	紀三井寺	375.9		Wakayama	Wakayama
Miyamae	宮前	378.8		Wakayama	Wakayama
Wakayama	和歌山	380.9	Hanwa Line (R54, through service to Tennōji), Wakayama Line; Kishigawa Line (01), Kisei Main Line	Wakayama	Wakayama

=== Wakayama to Wakayamashi (JR West) ===
Station	Japanese	Distance (km)	Transfers	Location	
Wakayama	和歌山	380.9	Hanwa Line (R54, through service to Tennōji), Wakayama Line; Kishigawa Line (01), Kinokuni Line	Wakayama	Wakayama
Kiwa	紀和	382.7		Wakayama	Wakayama
Wakayamashi	和歌山市	384.2	Nankai Kada Line (Kada Sakana Line), Nankai Main Line, Nankai Wakayamako Line (NK45)	Wakayama	Wakayama

== Rolling stock ==
=== JR Central ===
- KiHa 25 (since 1 August 2015)
- KiHa 75 (Mie rapid service)
- HC85 (Nanki limited express)

=== JR West ===
- 103 series
- 105 series
- 113 series
- 117 series
- 223 series (0 and 2500 subseries)
- 225-5000 series
- 227 series (from Spring 2019)
- 283 series (Kuroshio limited express)
- 287 series (Kuroshio limited express)
- 289 series (Kuroshio limited express)

=== Former ===
==== Passenger ====
- 165 series
- 221 series (until March 2011)
- 381 series (until 30 October 2015)
- 485 series
- KiHa 10 series
- KiHa 11 (until July 2015)
- KiHa 20 series
- KiHa 30 series
- KiHa 40 series
- KiHa 45 series
- KiHa 55 series
- KiHa 58 series
- KiHa 65
- KiHa 81 series
- KiHa 82 series
- KiHa 85 series
- Nankai Electric Railway KiHa 5501, KiHa 5505

==== Freight ====
- EF15
- DF50
- C58
- D60

== History ==
The line is composed of sections opened by four different railway companies, which were then nationalised and linked by the JGR/JNR.

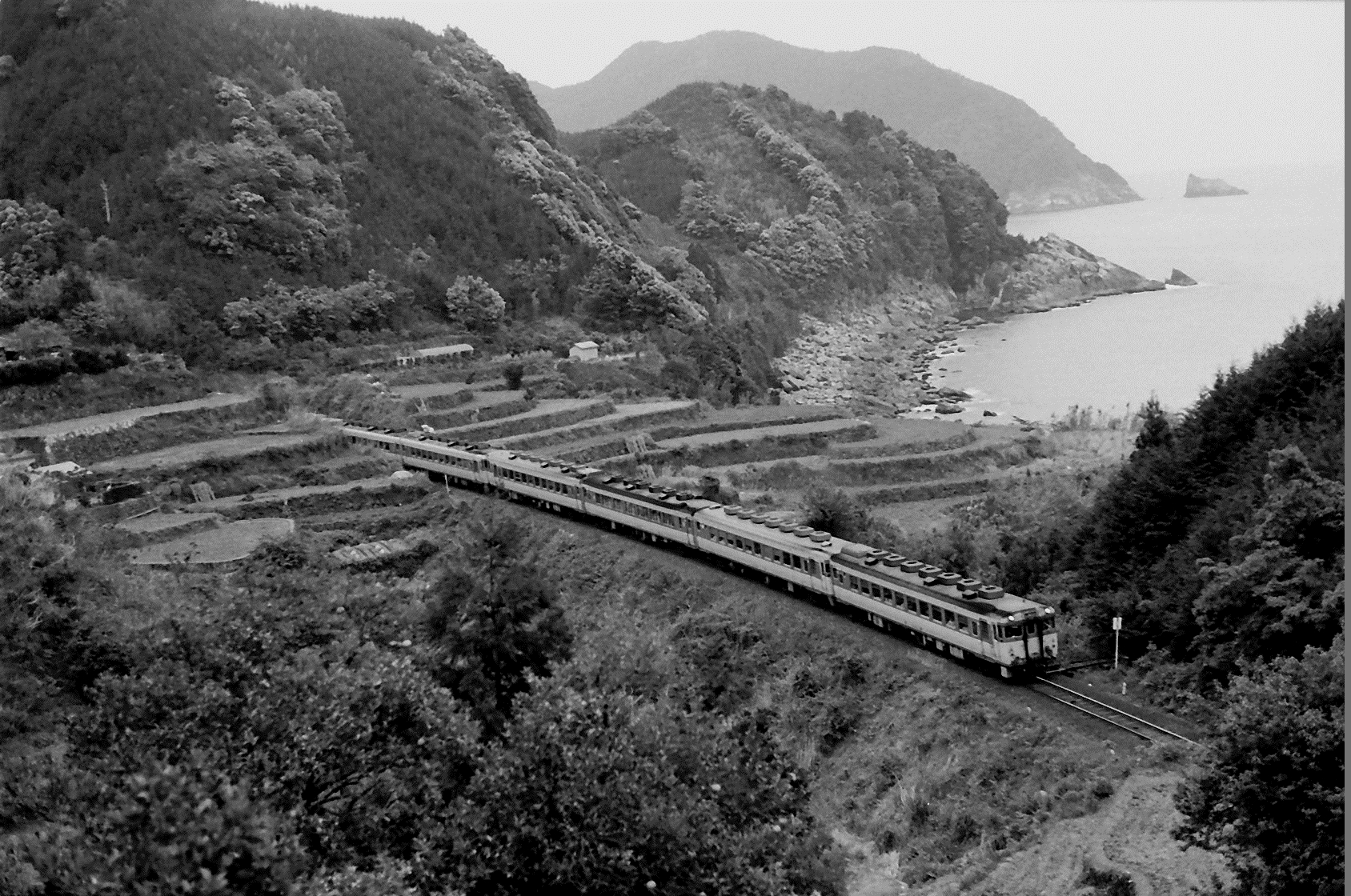
DMU train on Kisei main line in 1979

In 1891, the Kansai Railway opened the Kameyama to Tsu section, with the Sangu Railway opening the Tsu to Shoka section in 1893. At the western end, the Kiwa Railway opened the Wakayamashi to Wakayama section in 1903, and was acquired by the Kansai Railway the following year. The Kansai Railway and the Sangu Railway were nationalised in 1907. In 1912, the Shingu Railway opened the Kii-Katsuura to Miwasaki section, extending the line to Shingu the following year. The company was nationalised in 1934. On the eastern side of the Kii Peninsula, the Japanese Government Railway (JGR) extended the line from Shoka to Owase in sections between 1923 and 1934, whilst on the western side, it extended the line from Wakayama to Esumi in sections between 1924 and 1938. In 1935, the Kii-Katsuura to Taiji section was opened by JGR, extended to Kushimoto the following year, and to Esumi in 1940, providing a link to Wakayama and Osaka. The successor to JGR, the Japanese National Railways (JNR), opened the Owase to Shingu section in stages between 1956 and 1959, completing the line.

=== Double-tracking ===
The Akogi to Takajaya section was double-tracked in 1909, with the Matsusaka to Tokuwa section double-tracked two years later. In 1944, both sections were returned to single track and the recovered materials recycled for the Japanese war effort. The Wakayama to Kii-Tanabe section was double-tracked in stages between 1964 and 1978.

=== Electrification ===
The line was electrified between Wakayama and Shingu in 1978, with the Wakayama to Wakayamashi section being commissioned in 1984.

=== Other notable dates ===
CTC signalling was commissioned between Wakayama and Shingu in 1978, and extended to Kameyama in 1983.

Freight services ceased in 1986.

=== Former connecting lines ===
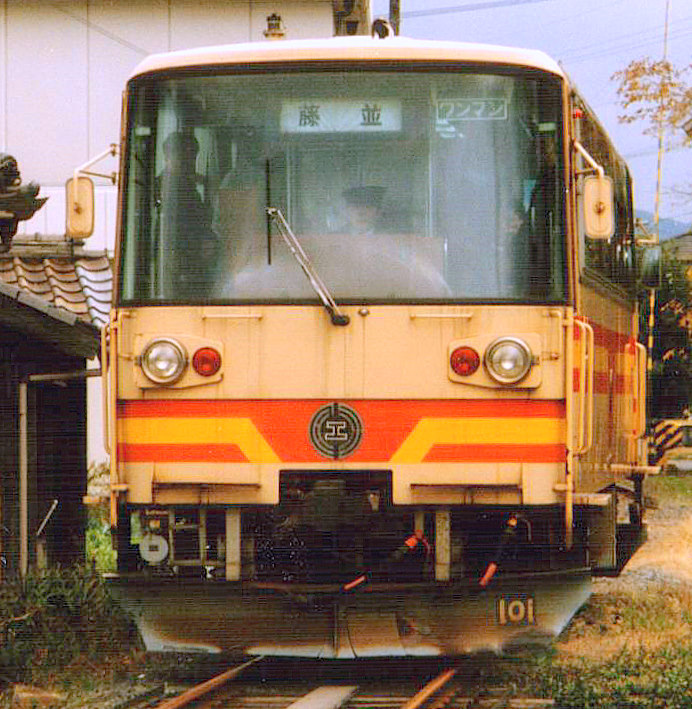
Arita Railway train, 2002

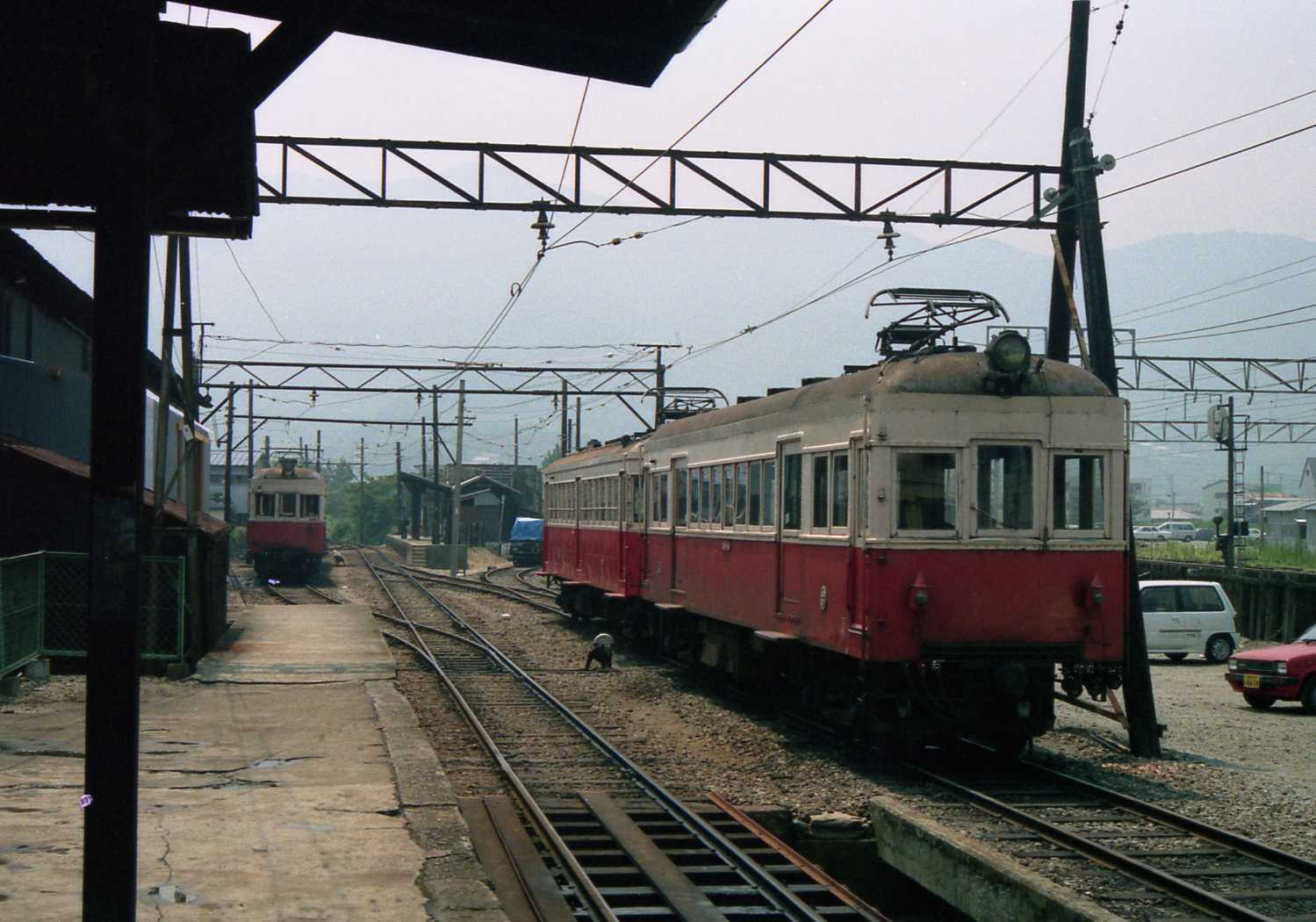
Nogami Electric Railway at Kainan

- Akogi Station: The Chusei Railway operated a 6 km 762 mm (2 ft 6 in) gauge line between Iwatahashi and Hisai between 1909 and 1942. At Hisai, it connected to the Dainippon Railway 15 km 762 mm gauge line to Ise-Kawaguchi on the Meisho Line between 1925 and 1942.
- Matsusaka Station: Mie Kotsu operated 20 km 762 mm line to Oishi between 1912 and 1964. The line was electrified at 600 V DC in 1927, although steam locomotives continued to be used until 1938.
- Tokuwa Station: The Ise Electric Railway "main line" connected here between 1930 and 1941.
- Funatsu Station: The Osugidani forest railway connected here to haul cedar. It was opened between 1929 and 1952 utilising 762 mm gauge, and featured a 17 km "main line" and nine branches of between 1 km and 11 km in length, as well as two cable-hauled inclines. The last line closed in 1974.
- Fujinami Station: The 9 km Arita Railway line between Yuasa and Kanaya which operated between 1915 and 2003 connected at this station.
- Kainan Station: The Nogami Electric Railway operated an 11 km line, electrified at 600 V DC, to Noburu-Yamaguchi between 1916 and 1994. Freight services operated between 1951 and 1971.
- Wakayama station - A 3 km line to Higashi-Matsue on the Nankai Kada Line opened in 1912. The line was electrified at 600 VDC in 1930, and closed in 1955.
- Kiwa Station: The Kishigawa Line commenced from this station from 1917 until the terminus was truncated 3 km to Wakayama in 1924.

== See also ==
- List of railway lines in Japan
