= Kushimoto Station =

Railway station in Kushimoto, Wakayama Prefecture, Japan

Kushimoto Station 串本駅
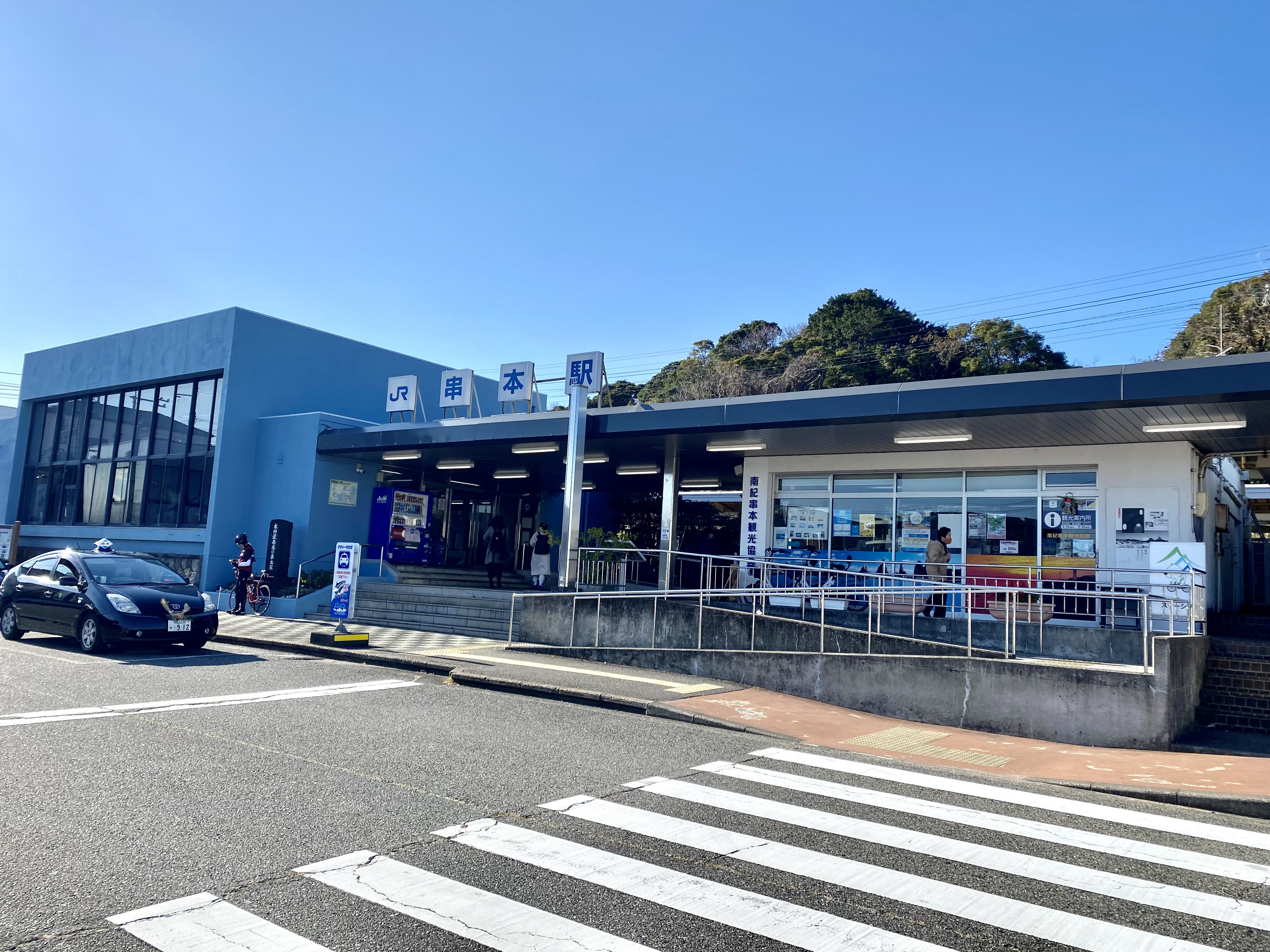
- Kushimoto Station Building (January 2022)

General information
- Location: 33-2, Kushimoto, Kushimoto-cho, Higashimuro-gun, Wakayama-ken 649-3503; Japan
- Coordinates: 33°28′31.74″N 135°46′54.88″E
- System: JR-West commuter rail station
- Owner: West Japan Railway Company
- Operator: West Japan Railway Company
- Line: W Kisei Main Line (Kinokuni Line)
- Distance: 221.8 km (137.8 miles) from Kameyama; 41.6 km (25.8 miles) from Shingū
- Platforms: 1 side + 1 island platform
- Tracks: 3
- Train operators: West Japan Railway Company
- Bus stands: yes

Construction
- Structure type: At grade

Other information
- Status: Staffed
- Website: Official website

History
- Opened: 11 December 1936
- Electrified: 1978

Passengers
- FY2019: 328 daily
Services
Preceding station	JR-West	Following station
W Kisei Main Line (Kinokuni Line)
Kii-Hime; Toward Kii-Katsuura and Shingū	Local	Kii-Arita; Toward Shirahama, Kii-Tanabe and Wakayama
Location
- Location within Wakayama Prefecture Location within Japan

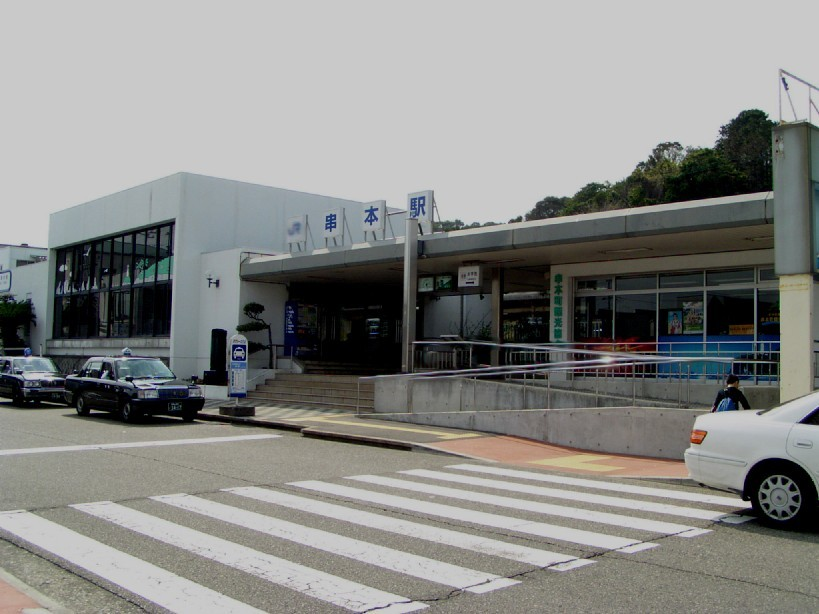
Kushimoto Station, 2005

Kushimoto Station (串本駅, Kushimoto-eki) is a passenger railway station in located in the town of Kushimoto, Higashimuro District, Wakayama Prefecture, Japan, operated by West Japan Railway Company (JR West). It is the southernmost railway station on Honshū.

== Lines ==
Kushimoto Station is served by the Kisei Main Line (Kinokuni Line), and is located 221.8 kilometers from the terminus of the line at Kameyama Station and 41.6 kilometers from Shingū.

== Station layout ==
The station consists of one island platform and one side platform connected to the station building by a footbridge. The station is staffed.

=== Platforms ===
1	■ W Kisei Main Line (Kinokuni Line)	for Shirahama, Kii-Tanabe, Wakayama, Shin-Ōsaka and Kyōto
2	■ W Kisei Main Line (Kinokuni Line)	forShirahama, Kii-Tanabe and Wakayama
2	■ W Kisei Main Line (Kinokuni Line)	for Kii-Katsuura and Shingū
3	■ W Kisei Main Line (Kinokuni Line)	for Kii-Katsuura and Shingū

== Adjacent stations ==
«	Service	»
West Japan Railway Company (JR West)
Kisei Main Line
Kii-Katsuura (Shingū bound trains); Koza (Kyōto bound trains)	West Express Ginga	Wakayama (Shingū bound trains); Susami (Kyōto bound trains)
Koza	Limited Express Kuroshio	Susami
Kii-Hime	Local	Kii-Arita

== History ==
Kushimoto Station opened on December 11, 1936. The current station building was completed in December 1979. With the privatization of the Japan National Railways (JNR) on April 1, 1987, the station came under the aegis of the West Japan Railway Company.

== Passenger statistics ==
In fiscal 2019, the station was used by an average of 328 passengers daily (boarding passengers only).

== Surrounding Area ==
- Kushimoto Town Hall
- Kushimoto Municipal Kushimoto Elementary School
- Kushimoto Municipal Kushimoto Junior High School
- Kushimoto Municipal Hospital
- Wakayama Prefectural Kushimoto High School
- Kushimoto Town Cultural Center

== See also ==
- List of railway stations in Japan
