= Kii-Katsuura Station =

Railway station in Nachikatsuura, Wakayama Prefecture, Japan

Coordinates: 33°37′41.28″N 135°56′30.52″E

Kii-Katsuura Station 紀伊勝浦駅
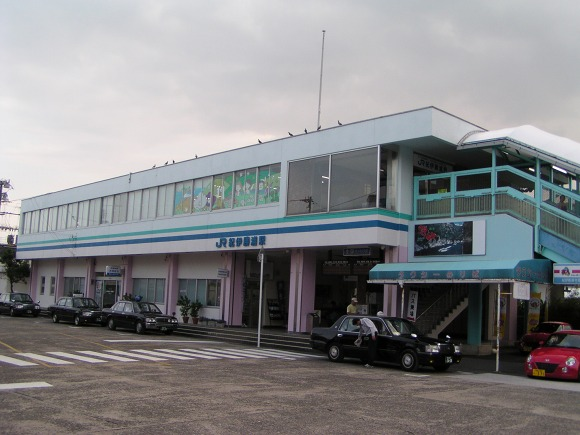
- Kii-Katsuura Station, August 2005

General information
- Location: 1-1, Tsukiji 6-chōme, Nachikatsuura Town, Higashimuro District; Wakayama Prefecture 649-5335; Japan
- Operator: JR West
- Line: W Kinokuni Line (Kinokuni Line)
- Distance: 195.1 km (121.2 miles) from Kameyama; 14.9 km (9.3 miles) from Shingū
- Platforms: 1 side platform + 1 island platform
- Tracks: 3
- Connections: Bus stop

Construction
- Structure type: At grade

Other information
- Status: Staffed (Midori no Madoguchi )
- Website: Official website Official Website 2

History
- Opened: 4 December 1912; 113 years ago
- Electrified: 1978
- Former names: Katsuura (1912 - 1934)

Passengers
- FY2019: 342 daily

Services
Preceding station	JR West	Following station
Yukawa towards Wakayama	Kinokuni Line Local	Kii-Temma towards Shingū
Kushimoto towards Kyoto	Kinokuni Line Shingū bound trains West Express Ginga	Shingū Terminus
Taiji towards Kyoto	Kinokuni Line Kyōto bound trains West Express Ginga	Shingū Terminus
Taiji towards Kyoto	Kinokuni Line Kuroshio	Shingū Terminus
Terminus	Kinokuni Line Nanki	Shingū towards Nagoya
Location
- Location within Wakayama Prefecture Location within Kansai region Location within Japan

Kii-Katsuura Station (紀伊勝浦駅, Kii-Katsuura-eki) is a passenger railway station in located in the town of Nachikatsuura, Higashimuro District, Wakayama Prefecture, Japan, operated by West Japan Railway Company (JR West).

== Lines ==
Kii-Katsuura Station is served by the Kisei Main Line (Kinokuni Line), and is located 195.1 kilometers from the terminus of the line at Kameyama Station and 14.9 kilometers from Shingū. As well as being served by JR West trains heading towards Wakayama, Osaka and Kyoto such as the Kuroshio Limited Express, it is also the southern terminus of JR Central's Nanki Limited Express service to and from Nagoya.

== Station layout ==
The station consists of one side platform and one island platform connected to the station building by a footbridge. The station has a Midori no Madoguchi staffed ticket office.

=== Platforms ===
1	W Kisei Main Line (Kinokuni Line)	for Shingū, Kumanoshi, Matsusaka, Tsu, and Nagoya
2	W Kisei Main Line (Kinokuni Line)	for Kushimoto, Shirahama, Wakayama, Tennōji, Shin-Ōsaka, and Kyōto
3	W Kisei Main Line (Kinokuni Line)	for Shingū

== History ==
Kii-Katsuura Station opened as Katsuura Station (勝浦駅) on the Shingu Railway on December 4, 1912. The Shingu Railway was nationalized on July 1, 1934, at which time the name was changed to its present name. With the privatization of the Japan National Railways (JNR) on April 1, 1987, the station came under the aegis of the West Japan Railway Company.

== Passenger statistics ==
In fiscal 2019, the station was used by an average of 342 passengers daily (boarding passengers only).

== Surrounding Area ==
- Katsuura Port
- Katsuura Fish Market
- Katsuura Onsen
- Nachi Falls
- Kumano Nachi Taisha
- Daimonzaka (Kumano Kodo pilgrimage trail)
- Nachikatsuura Town Hall
- Katsuura Elementary School

== See also ==
- List of railway stations in Japan
