= Shingū Station =

Railway station in Shingū, Wakayama Prefecture, Japan

Shingū Station 新宮駅
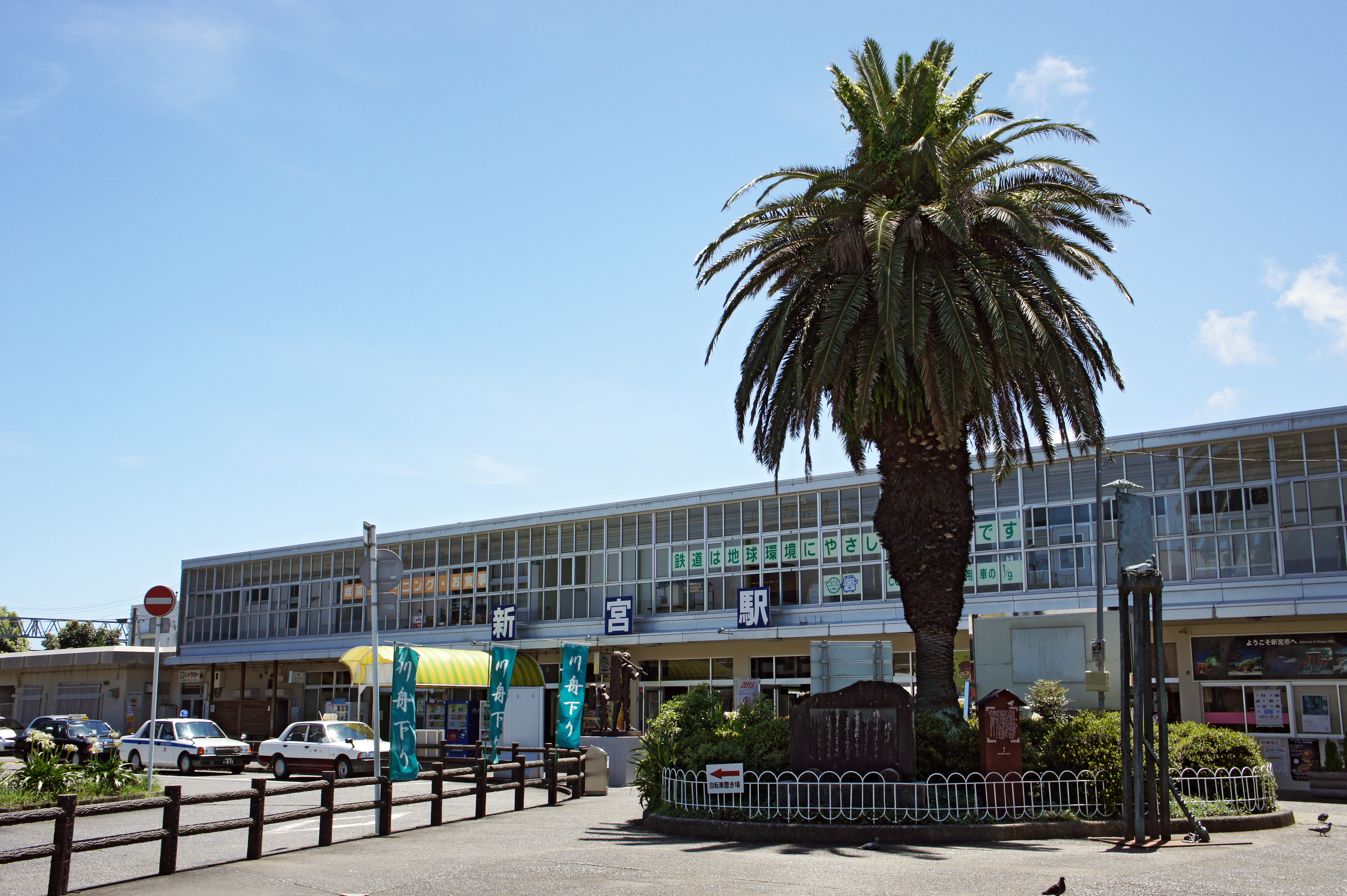
- Shingū Station

General information
- Location: 1-1, Jofuku 2-chōme, Shingū City, Wakayama Prefecture 647-0020; Japan
- Coordinates: 33°43′30.76″N 135°59′38.97″E
- Operator: JR Central; JR West
- Lines: Kisei Main Line; W Kinokuni Line (Kinokuni Line)
- Distance: 180.2 km (112.0 miles) from Kameyama
- Platforms: 2 side platform
- Tracks: 3
- Bus stands: yes

Construction
- Structure type: At grade
- Accessible: None

Other information
- Status: Staffed (Midori no Madoguchi)
- Website: Official website

History
- Opened: 11 March 1913; 113 years ago
- Electrified: 1978

Passengers
- FY2019: 920 daily
Services
Preceding station	JR West	Following station
Miwasaki towards Wakayama	Kinokuni Line Local	Terminus
Kii-Katsuura towards Kyoto	Kinokuni Line Kuroshio	Terminus
Kii-Katsuura towards Kyoto	Kinokuni Line West Express Ginga	Terminus
Kii-Katsuura Terminus	Kinokuni Line Nanki	through to JR Central Kisei Main Line
Preceding station	JR Central	Following station
through to JR West Kisei Line	Kisei Main Line Local	Udono towards Nagoya
through to JR West Kisei Main Line	Kisei Main Line Nanki	Kumanoshi towards Nagoya
Location
- Location within Wakayama Prefecture Location within Kansai region Location within Japan

Shingū Station (新宮駅, Shingū-eki) is an interchange passenger railway station located in the city of Shingū, Wakayama Prefecture, Japan, jointly operated by JR West and JR Central.

== Overview ==
Shingū Station is the main railway station in Shingū, and plays an important role in the operation of the Kisei Main Line. The jurisdiction of the Kisei Main Line is divided at Shingū Station. The section of the line southwest of Shingū Station falls under JR West's jurisdiction and the section northeast of Shingū Station falls under JR Tōkai's jurisdiction. In addition, the station serves as the border for electrification, as the JR Tōkai portion of the line running is not electrified. There is a sign stating the boundary between the two companies at the North entrance of the Tankaku tunnel.

== Lines ==
Shingū Station is served by the Kisei Main Line (Kinokuni Line), and is located 180.2 kilometers from the terminus of the line at Kameyama Station.

== Station layout ==
The station consists of one island platform and one side platform connected to the station building by an underground passage. The station has a Midori no Madoguchi staffed ticket office. There are 31 coin operated luggage lockers at this station, which may be rented for up to three days.

=== Platforms ===
1	■ W Kisei Main Line (Kinokuni Line)	for Kii-Katsuura, Wakayama, Shin-Ōsaka and Kyōto
2, 3	■ W Kisei Main Line (Kinokuni Line)	for Kii-Katsuura, Wakayama, Shin-Ōsaka and Kyōto
2, 3	■ ■ Kisei Main Line	for Kumanoshi, Matsusaka, Yokkaichi and Nagoya

== History ==
Shingū Station opened on the Shingu Railway on 1 March 1913. The Shingu Railway was nationalized on 1 July 1934, and the station was relocated 40 meters to the south of its original location on 30 May 1928. The station building burned down due to a fire which began in the checked luggage storage room on 21 January 1951. With the privatization of the Japan National Railways (JNR) on 1 April 1987, the station came under the aegis of the West Japan Railway Company (JR West) and the Japan Freight Railway Company (JR Freight). Freight operations were terminated from 16 March 1996.

== Passenger statistics ==
In fiscal 2019, the station was used by an average of 920 passengers daily (boarding passengers only).

== Surrounding area ==
- Shingū Castle
- Shingu City Museum of History and Folklore
- Ukijima no Mori
- Kumano River
- Shingu City Hall
- Shingu City Library

== See also ==
- List of railway stations in Japan
