= Wakayama Station =

Railway station in Wakayama, Wakayama Prefecture, Japan

Coordinates: 34.232126°N 135.191145°E

Wakayama Station 和歌山駅
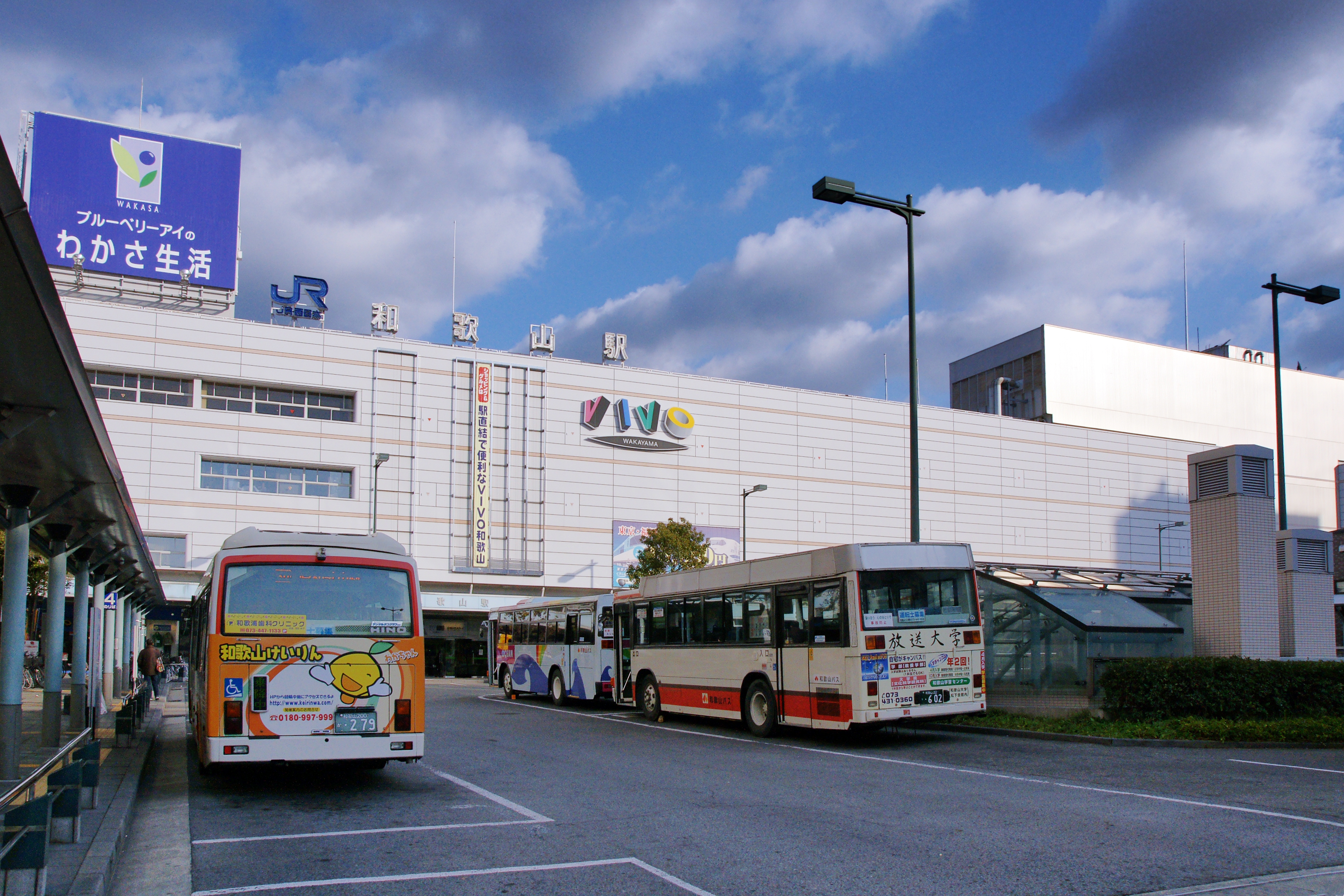
- Wakayama Station, December 2008

General information
- Location: 61, Misonocho 5-chome, Wakayama-shi, Wakayama-ken; Japan
- Operator: West Japan Railway Company; Wakayama Electric Railway
- Lines: T Wakayama Line; W Kisei Main Line (Kinokuni Line); R Hanwa Line; ■ Kishigawa Line
- Platforms: 2 side + 3 island platforms
- Connections: Bus terminal

Other information
- Status: Staffed

History
- Opened: 28 February 1924

Passengers
- FY2019: 18,258 daily (JR); 4346 daily (Wakayama)
Location
- Location within Wakayama Prefecture Location within Japan

Wakayama Station (和歌山駅, Wakayama-eki) is an interchange passenger railway station located in the city of Wakayama, Wakayama Prefecture, Japan, jointly operated by the West Japan Railway Company (JR West) and the private railway company Wakayama Electric Railway.

== Lines ==
Wakayama Station is the western terminus of the 87.5 kilometer Wakayama Line for Ōji and the 380.9 kilometer Kisei Main Line (Kinokuni Line) for Kameyama and the southern terminus of the 61.3 kilometer Hanwa Line for Tennoji. It is also the western terminal of the Wakayama Electric Railway Kishigawa Line, and is located 14.3 kilometers from the opposing terminal of the line at Kishi Station.

== Station layout ==
The station has two side platforms and three island platforms, serving a total of eight ground-level tracks. The platforms are connected by means of a footbridge and an underground passage.

=== Platforms ===
1	■ W Limited Express from the Kinokuni Line	"Kuroshio" for Tennōji, Shin-Ōsaka, Kyōto
1	■ R Hanwa Line	for Hineno, Otori and Tennōji; Change trains at Hineno for Kansai Airport
2, 3	■ R Hanwa Line	for Hineno, Otori and Tennōji (local trains, rapid service); Change trains at Hineno for Kansai Airport
4	■ W Limited Express to the Kinokuni Line	"Kuroshio" for Shirahama and Shingū
4, 5	■ W Kisei Main Line (Kinokuni Line)	for Gobō and Kii-Tanabe
4, 5	■ R Hanwa Line	for Hineno, Otori and Tennōji (rapid service (partly)); Change trains at Hineno for Kansai Airport
7	■ T Wakayama Line	for Kokawa, Hashimoto and Gojō
8	■ W Kisei Main Line (Kinokuni Line)	for Kiwa and Wakayamashi
9	■ Wakayama Railway Kishigawa Line	for Kōtsū Center Mae and Kishi

== Adjacent stations ==
«	Service	»
JR West Kisei Line for Miyamae and Gobo (Kinokuni Line)
Miyamae	Local (including rapid and direct rapid on Hanwa Line)	Kii-Nakanoshima or Musota (Hanwa Line) or Kiwa(Wakayamashi-bound)
Kimiidera	Rapid	Musota (Hanwa Line)
Kainan	Limited Express Kuroshio	Hanwa Line
Tennoji (JR-R20)	West Express Ginga	Kushimoto; Kainan (One-way Operation)
JR West Kisei Line for Wakayamashi
Terminus	Local	Kiwa
JR West Hanwa Line
Kii-Nakanoshima	Local	Terminus
Kii-Nakanoshima	Regional Rapid (terminating only)	Terminus
Kii-Nakanoshima	Kishuji Rapid	Terminus
Musota	Kishuji Rapid (some morning trains)	Terminus
Musota	Rapid	Terminus
Musota	Direct Rapid	Terminus
Izumi-Sunagawa	Limited Express Kuroshio	Kisei Line
JR West Wakayama Line
Tainose	Local	Terminus
Iwade	Rapid	Terminus
Wakayama Railway Kishigawa Line
Terminus	Local	Tanakaguchi

== History ==
Wakayama Station opened on 28 February 1924.

== Passenger statistics ==
In fiscal 2019, the JR West station was used by an average of 18,258 passengers daily (boarding passengers only) and the Wakayama Electric Railway portion by 4,346 passengers daily (boarding passengers only).

== Surrounding area ==
- Wakayama Terminal Building
- Kintetsu Department Store Wakayama Store
- Wakayama MIO North Building

== See also ==
- List of railway stations in Japan
