= List of cities in Wakayama Prefecture by population =

The following list sorts all cities (including towns) in the Japanese prefecture of Wakayama with a population of more than 5,000 according to the 2020 Census. As of October 1, 2020, 24 places fulfill this criterion and are listed here. This list refers only to the population of individual cities, towns and villages within their defined limits, which does not include other municipalities or suburban areas within urban agglomerations.

== List ==
The following table lists the 24 cities and towns in Wakayama with a population of at least 5,000 on October 1, 2020, according to the 2020 Census. The table also gives an overview of the evolution of the population since the 1995 census.

Rank (2020)	Name	Status	2020	2015	2010	2005	2000	1995
1	Wakayama	City	356,858	364,154	370,364	375,591	386,551	393,885
2	Tanabe	City	69,906	74,770	79,119	82,499	85,646	86,159
3	Hashimoto	City	60,863	63,621	66,361	68,529	70,469	69,329
4	Kinokawa	City	58,856	62,616	65,840	67,862	70,067	68,802
5	Iwade	City	53,993	53,452	52,882	50,834	48,156	41,550
6	Kainan	City	48,400	51,860	54,783	57,744	60,373	62,634
7	Shingū	City	27,187	29,331	31,498	33,790	35,176	36,278
8	Arida	City	26,553	28,470	30,592	32,143	33,661	34,283
9	Aridagawa	Town	25,274	26,361	27,162	28,640	29,563	29,703
10	Gobō	City	23,488	24,801	26,111	27,053	28,034	28,510
11	Shirahama	Town	20,270	21,533	22,696	23,642	24,563	24,916
12	Katsuragi	Town	15,990	16,992	18,230	19,670	20,945	22,052
13	Kamitonda	Town	15,240	14,989	14,807	14,775	14,501	13,752
14	Kushimoto	Town	14,969	16,558	18,249	19,931	21,429	22,521
15	Nachikatsuura	Town	14,144	15,682	17,080	18,185	19,417	19,943
16	Minabe	Town	11,823	12,742	13,470	14,200	14,734	14,907
17	Yuasa	Town	11,117	12,200	13,210	14,742	15,410	16,067
18	Hidakagawa	Town	9,223	9,776	10,509	11,305	11,607	11,556
19	Kimino	Town	8,264	9,206	10,391	11,643	12,387	13,378
20	Inami	Town	7,722	8,068	8,606	9,192	9,769	10,077
21	Hidaka	Town	7,673	7,641	7,432	7,344	7,148	6,926
22	Mihama	Town	6,866	7,480	8,077	8,462	8,802	8,919
23	Hirogawa	Town	6,785	7,224	7,714	8,071	8,361	8,735
24	Yura	Town	5,373	5,837	6,508	7,179	7,625	8,056
