= Mihama =

Mihama may refer to:

- Mihama, Aichi, a town in Aichi Prefecture
- Mihama, Fukui, a town in Fukui Prefecture
- Mihama, Mie, a town in Mie Prefecture
- Mihama, Wakayama, a town in Wakayama Prefecture
- Mihama-ku, a ward in Chiba, Chiba
- Mihama, a district in Chatan, Okinawa
