= Hirokawa Beach Station =

Railway station in Hirogawa, Wakayama Prefecture, Japan

Hirokawa Beach Station 広川ビーチ駅
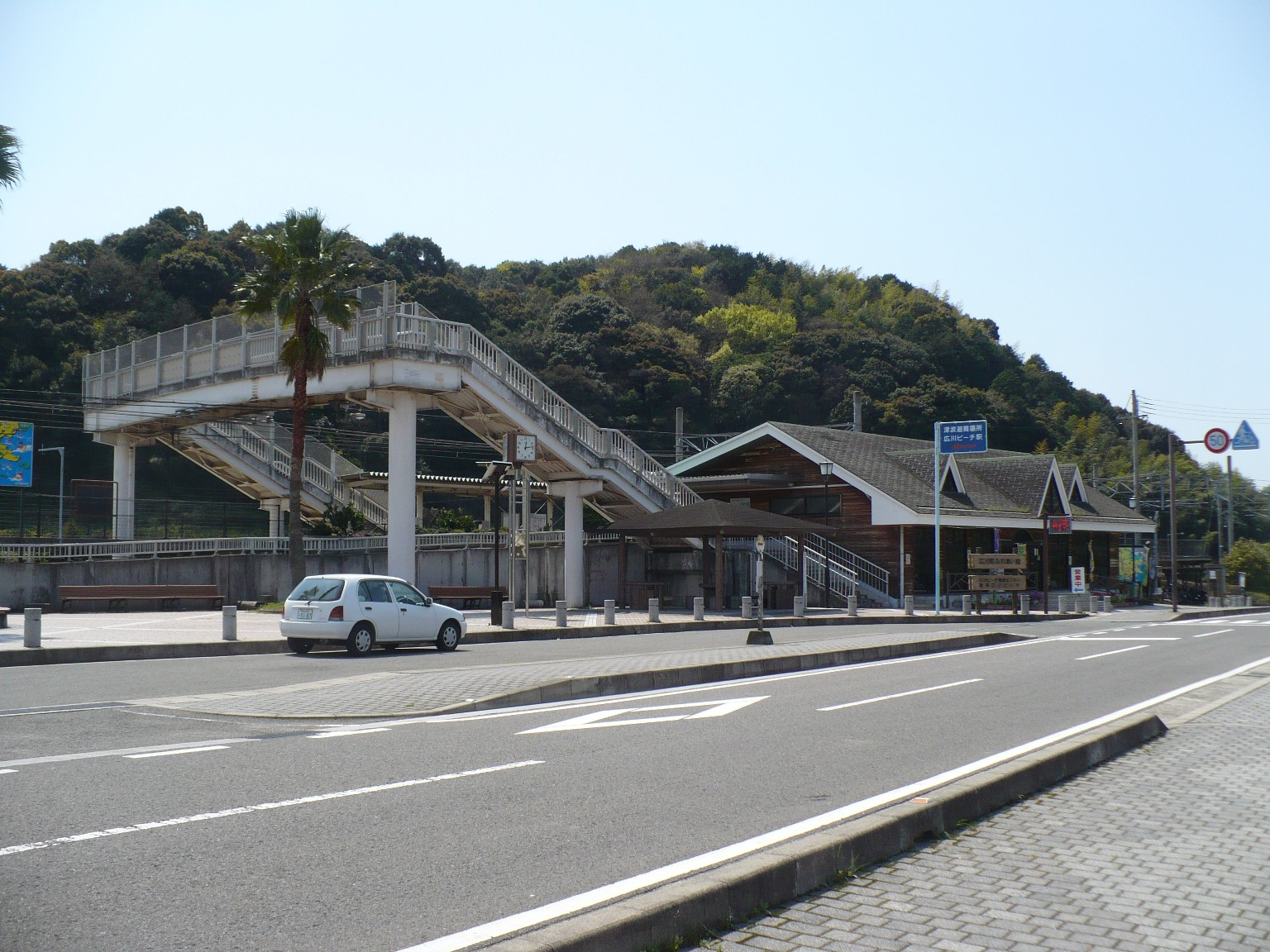
- Hirokawa Beach Station in April 2010

General information
- Location: 971-1 Yamamoto, Hirogawa-cho, Arida-gun, Wakayama-ken 643-0072; Japan
- Coordinates: 34.0132°N 135.1629°E
- System: JR-West commuter rail station
- Owner: West Japan Railway Company
- Operator: West Japan Railway Company
- Line: W Kisei Main Line (Kinokuni Line)
- Distance: 341.3 km (212.1 miles) from Kameyama; 161.1 km (100.1 miles) from Shingū
- Platforms: 2 side platforms
- Tracks: 2
- Train operators: West Japan Railway Company

Construction
- Structure type: At grade
- Accessible: None

Other information
- Status: Unstaffed
- Website: Official website

History
- Opened: 14 March 1993
- Electrified: 1978

Passengers
- FY2019: 197 daily
Services
| Preceding station | JR-West | Following station |
W Kisei Main Line (Kinokuni Line)
Limited Express Kuroshio: Does not stop at this station
Rapid: Does not stop at this station
| Kii-Yura | Local | Yuasa |
Location
- Location within Wakayama Prefecture Location within Japan

Hirokawa Beach Station (広川ビーチ駅, Hirokawa Biichi-eki) is a passenger railway station in located in the town of Hirogawa, Arida District, Wakayama Prefecture, Japan, operated by West Japan Railway Company (JR West).

== Lines ==
Hirokawa Beach Station is served by the Kisei Main Line (Kinokuni Line), and is located 341.3 kilometers from the terminus of the line at Kameyama Station and 161.1 kilometers from Shingū.

== Station layout ==
The station consists of two opposed side platforms connected to the station building by a footbridge. The station is unattended.

=== Platforms ===
| 1 | ■ W Kisei Main Line (Kinokuni Line) | for Wakayama and Tennōji |
| 2 | ■ W Kisei Main Line (Kinokuni Line) | for Gobō and Shingū |

== Adjacent stations ==
| « | Service | » |
West Japan Railway Company (JR West)
Kisei Main Line
Limited Express Kuroshio: Does not stop at this station
Rapid: Does not stop at this station
| Kii-Yura | Local | Yuasa |

== History ==
Hirokawa Beach Station opened on 14 March 1993.

== Passenger statistics ==
In fiscal 2019, the station was used by an average of 197 passengers daily (boarding passengers only).

== Surrounding Area ==
- Hirogawa Municipal Minamihiro Elementary School
- Nishihiro Beach
- Kashinaga Beach
- Kumano Kodo

== See also ==
- List of railway stations in Japan
