= Gobo Festival =

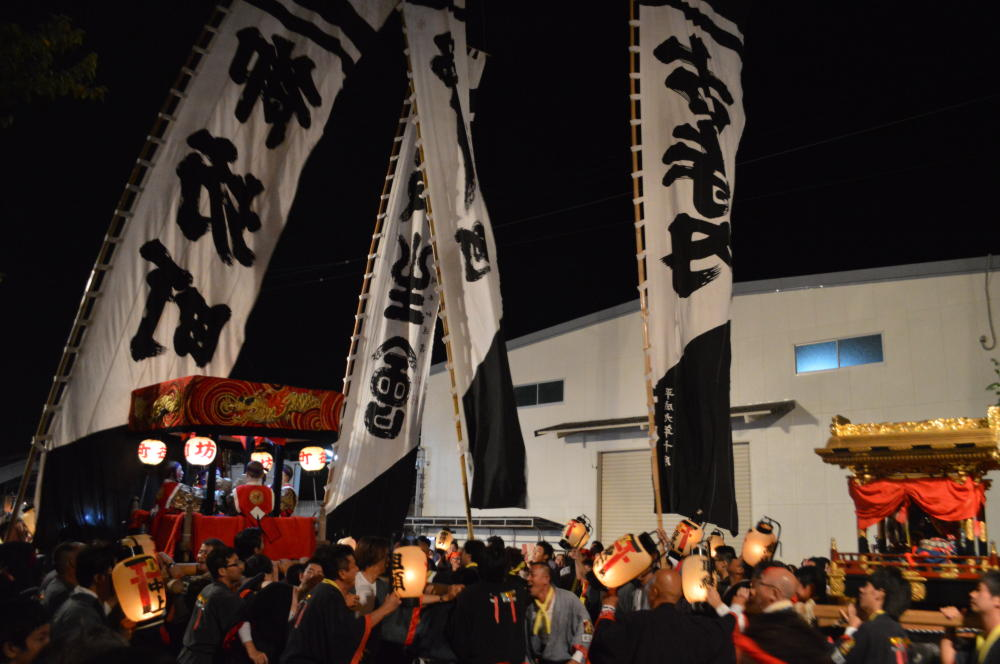
Scene of entering Gobo Matsurimiya

Gobo Festival (御坊祭) is held annually on the 4th and 5 October at Shinohachiman Shrine (小竹八幡神社) in Gobo City, Wakayama, Japan. It is at least 430 years old. It is the biggest festival in the Gobo and Hidaka Districts of Wakayama Prefecture. There is an old saying that if you want to see crowds, go to Gobo Festival. One source says that around 30,000 people attend the festival.

== The Festival ==
Nine districts from Gobo City and the neighboring Miahama Town take part in the festival: Nakagumi, Hamanosegumi, Shimogumi, Kishinogumi, Gobocho, Nayagumi, Higashisonogumi, Kasugagumi, and Kamigumi. The number of districts has varied over time, and at one point there were 10 districts, but the district called Kasugagumi no longer participates.

Each neighborhood partakes in different activities, including carrying omikoshi (お神輿), or portable shrines, carrying yotsudaiko (四つ太鼓) - wooden structures which hold 4 boys playing taiko drums, playing traditional flute songs, banner raising, and performing lion dances (獅子舞). Girls carry lanterns and play the flute, while boys and men carry lanterns, play taiko, and carry the omikoshi and yotsudaiko.

The ceremony on the 4th is a preliminary celebration on the eve of the festival day, known as Yoimatsuri (宵祭). In Gobo, it is referred to as the "Kasazoroe Ceremony" (傘揃え式). For this ceremony, each district's banners are brought together in the shrine grounds. (Banners are an important symbol of status at the festival.) After 12pm, the banners, yotsudaiko, and portable shrines enter the shrine grounds in order, and pass under the tori gate. Lion dances and "servant dances" are performed as an offering, and then everyone departs.

On the morning of the 5th, each district's banners and portable shrines make a procession with a Shinto priest in the lead, and a Shinto ceremony is performed. After this, the procession makes a lap around town, and returns to the shrine. On years when the yotsudaiko have been built anew, the yotsudaiko also accompany this procession. When this is the case, the procession goes to the beach and the new yotsudaiko are purified in the waves. After the procession has returned to the shrine, dances such as the sparrow dance and the "Kehon Dance" are performed. (The Kehon Dance has been designated as the prefecture's number one abstract cultural asset.) Next, the banners, portable shrines, and yotsudaiko begin a procession outside the shrine as lion dances and the "Yatsu Dance" are performed inside. At the end of the night, each district's portable shrines once again enter the shrine grounds in order, although they struggle against one another to keep from entering for as long as possible. The yotsudaiko chant "rainenno, rainenno nagonagori shanai," which means "can't help that next year we'll be reluctant to part too." Once they have all returned to the shrine hall, the lanterns are extinguished and it is said that the ancestors' spirits return as well to the shrine as the festival ends.

== Districts ==
1. Nakagumi - 中組 Nickname: Shinmachi (新町); Nakagumi's banner is meant to tell the gods that the festival has begun, and are raised right as the festival begins. Because of its special meaning, the banner is large and made to withstand strong winds.
2. Hamanosegumi - 濱之瀬組 Nickname: Hama (濱); this district joined Gobo Festival in 1660 from Mihama Town after many members of the Shinohachiman Shrine migrated to Mihama from Gobo. Their famous yotsudaiko chant is "saitekuryo."
3. Shimogumi - 下組 Nickname: Chamen, Shimo (下); The Shimo district has the smallest number of participants.
4. Kishinogumi - 紀小竹組 Nickname: Kishino (紀小竹); The Kishino district has participated in Gobo Festival since the Edo era.
5. Gobocho - 御坊町 Nickname: Gobo (御坊);
6. Nayagumi - 名屋組 Nickname: Naya (名屋); Naya district used to be a part of a different shrine called Susa Shrine, and only began participating in Gobo Matsuri in the Meiji era when Susa Shrine was combined with Shinohachiman Shrine.
7. Higashisonogumi - 東園組 Nickname: Sono (園); Higashisono is a relatively recent addition to Gobo Festival, but they have a large turnout in participants and a reputation for being tough.
8. Kasugagumi - 春日組 Nickname: Kasuga (春日); Kasuga stopped participating in the festival in 1955 and but rejoined in 2003.
9. Kamigumi - 上組 Nickname: Tsubaki (椿); because Kamigumi is the last in the festival lineup, they are the last to enter the shrine grounds, and the festival won't end until they do.
