= Kirime Station =

Railway station in Inami, Wakayama Prefecture, Japan

Kirime Station 切目駅
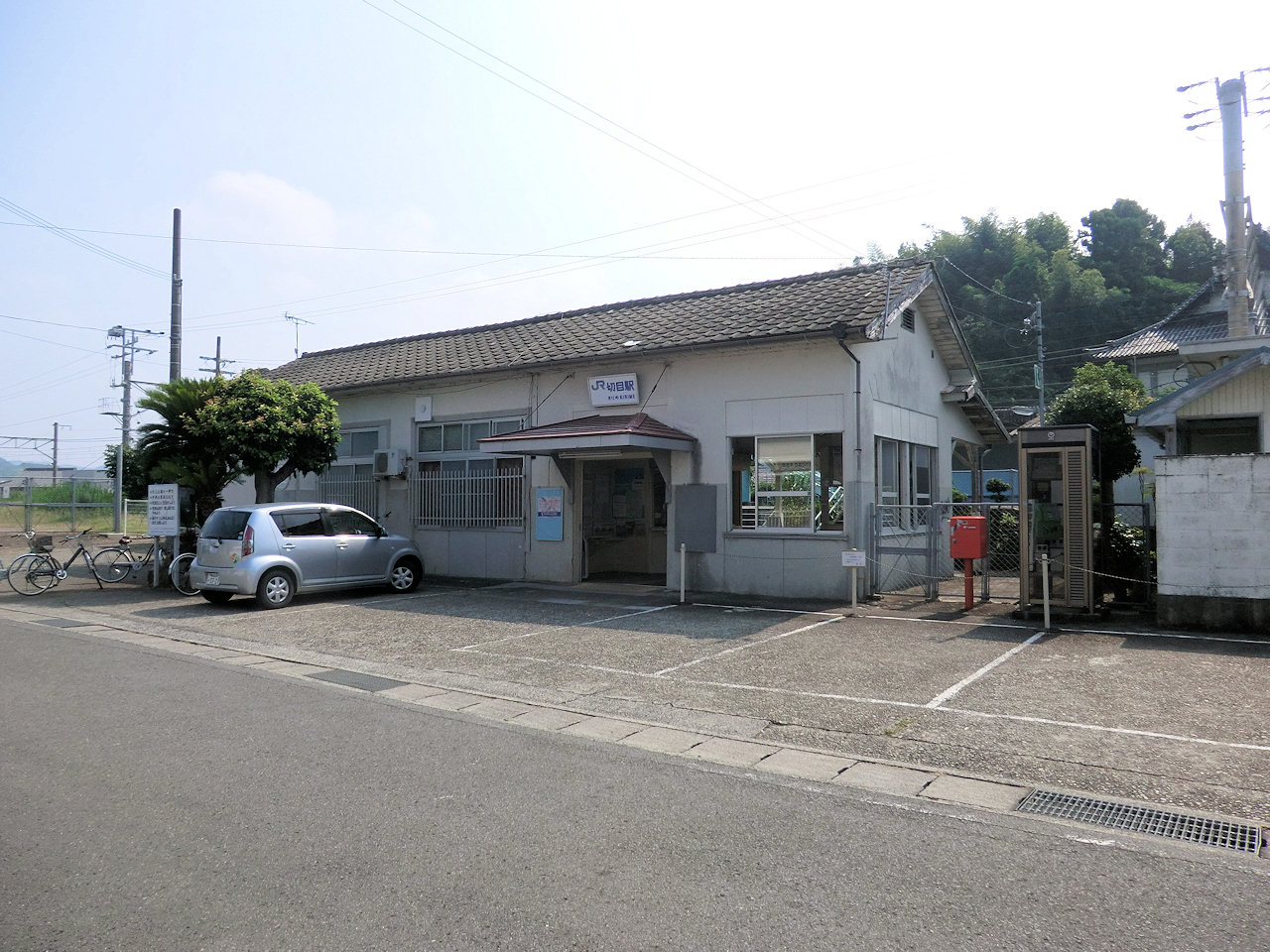
- Kirime Station in July 2012

General information
- Location: 1039-2 Shimada, Inami-cho, Hidaka-gun, Wakayama-ken 649-1527; Japan
- Coordinates: 33.7969°N 135.2412°E
- System: JR-West commuter rail station
- Owner: West Japan Railway Company
- Operator: West Japan Railway Company
- Line: W Kisei Main Line (Kinokuni Line)
- Distance: 305.5 km (189.8 miles) from Kameyama; 125.3 km (77.9 miles) from Shingū
- Platforms: 2 side platforms
- Tracks: 2
- Train operators: West Japan Railway Company

Construction
- Structure type: At grade
- Accessible: None

Other information
- Status: Unstaffed
- Website: Official website

History
- Opened: 21 September 1931
- Electrified: 1978

Passengers
- FY2019: 60 daily
Services
Preceding station	JR-West	Following station
W Kisei Main Line (Kinokuni Line)
Limited Express Kuroshio: Does not stop at this station
Iwashiro	Rapid	Inami
Iwashiro	Local	Inami
Location
- Location within Wakayama Prefecture Location within Japan

Kirime Station (切目駅, Kirime-eki) is a passenger railway station in located in the town of Inami, Hidaka District, Wakayama Prefecture, Japan, operated by West Japan Railway Company (JR West).

== Lines ==
Kirime Station is served by the Kisei Main Line (Kinokuni Line), and is located 305.5 kilometers from the terminus of the line at Kameyama Station and 125.3 kilometers from Shingū.

== Station layout ==
The station consists of two opposed side platform s connected to the station building by a footbridge. The station is unattended.

=== Platforms ===
1	■ W Kisei Main Line (Kinokuni Line)	for Wakayama and Tennōji
2	■ W Kisei Main Line (Kinokuni Line)	for Kii-Tanabe and Shingū

== Adjacent stations ==
«	Service	»
West Japan Railway Company (JR West)
Kisei Main Line
Limited Express Kuroshio: Does not stop at this station
Iwashiro	Rapid	Inami
Iwashiro	Local	Inami

== History ==
Kirime Station opened on September 21, 1931. With the privatization of the Japan National Railways (JNR) on April 1, 1987, the station came under the aegis of the West Japan Railway Company.

== Passenger statistics ==
In fiscal 2019, the station was used by an average of 60 passengers daily (boarding passengers only).

== Surrounding Area ==
- National Route 42
- Kirime Elementary School
- Inami Municipal Kirime Junior High School
- Kirime Post Office

== See also ==
- List of railway stations in Japan
