= Dōjōji Station =

Railway station in Gobō, Wakayama Prefecture, Japan

Dōjōji Station 道成寺駅
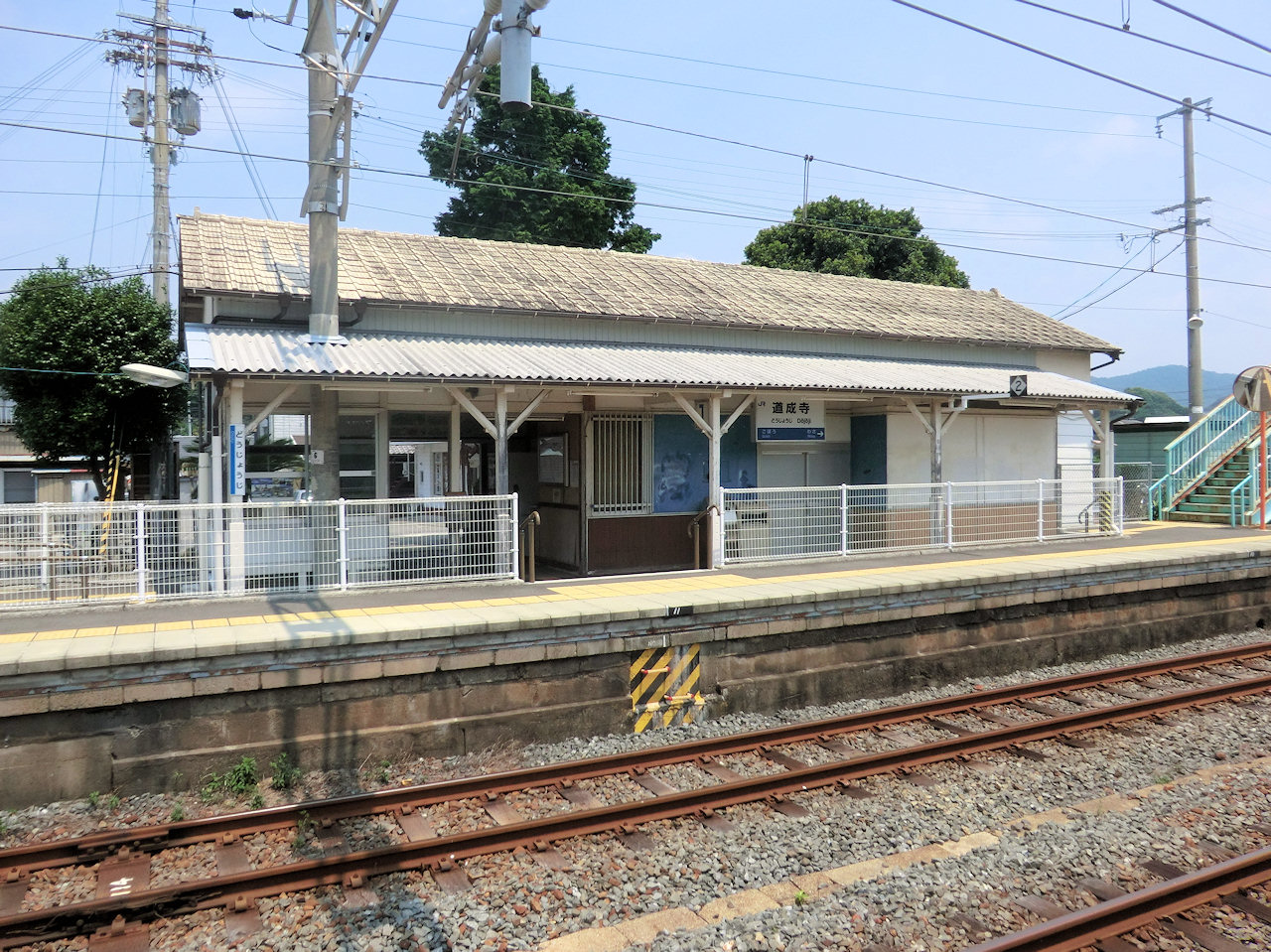
- Dōjōji Station in July 2012

General information
- Location: 1865-4 Fujii Fujitachō, Gobō-shi, Wakayama-ken 649-1341; Japan
- Coordinates: 33.9112°N 135.1762°E
- System: JR-West commuter rail station
- Owner: West Japan Railway Company
- Operator: West Japan Railway Company
- Line: W Kisei Main Line (Kinokuni Line)
- Distance: 324.7 km (201.8 miles) from Kameyama; 144.5 km (89.8 miles) from Shingū
- Platforms: 2 side platforms
- Tracks: 2
- Train operators: West Japan Railway Company

Construction
- Structure type: At grade
- Accessible: None

Other information
- Status: Unstaffed
- Website: Official website

History
- Opened: 14 December 1930
- Electrified: 1978

Passengers
- FY2019: 80 daily
Services
Preceding station	JR-West	Following station
W Kisei Main Line (Kinokuni Line)
Limited Express Kuroshio: Does not stop at this station
Wasa	Rapid	Gobō
Wasa	Local	Gobō
Location
- Location within Wakayama Prefecture Location within Japan

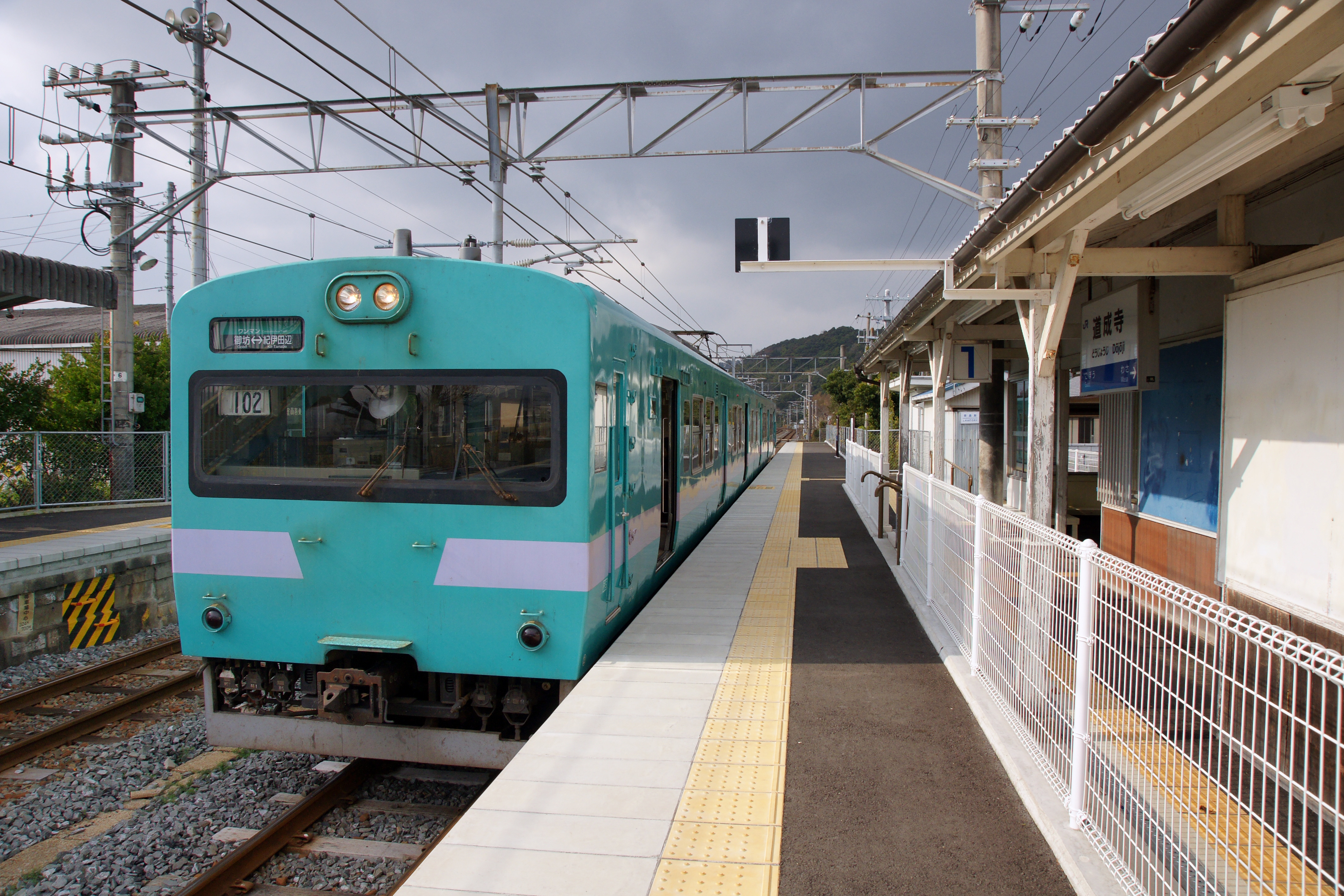
Platform

Dōjōji Station (道成寺駅, Dōjōji-eki) is a passenger railway station in located in the city of Gobō, Wakayama Prefecture, Japan, operated by West Japan Railway Company (JR West).

== Lines ==
Dōjōji Station is served by the Kisei Main Line (Kinokuni Line), and is located 324.7 kilometers from the terminus of the line at Kameyama Station and 144.5 kilometers from Shingū.

== Station layout ==
The station consists of two opposed side platforms connected to the station building by a footbridge. The station is unattended.

=== Platforms ===
1	■ W Kisei Main Line (Kinokuni Line)	for Kii-Tanabe and Shingū
2	■ W Kisei Main Line (Kinokuni Line)	for Wakayama and Tennōji

== Adjacent stations ==
«	Service	»
West Japan Railway Company (JR West)
Kisei Main Line
Limited Express Kuroshio: Does not stop at this station
Wasa	Rapid	Gobō
Wasa	Local	Gobō

== History ==
Dōjōji Station opened on December 14, 1930. With the privatization of the Japan National Railways (JNR) on April 1, 1987, the station came under the aegis of the West Japan Railway Company.

== Passenger statistics ==
In fiscal 2019, the station was used by an average of 80 passengers daily (boarding passengers only).

== Surrounding Area ==
- Dōjō-ji Temple
- Hidaka River
- Gobo City Fujita Elementary School
- Taisei Junior High School

== See also ==
- List of railway stations in Japan
