= Kii-Uchihara Station =

Railway station in Hidaka, Wakayama Prefecture, Japan

Kii-Uchihara Station 紀伊内原駅
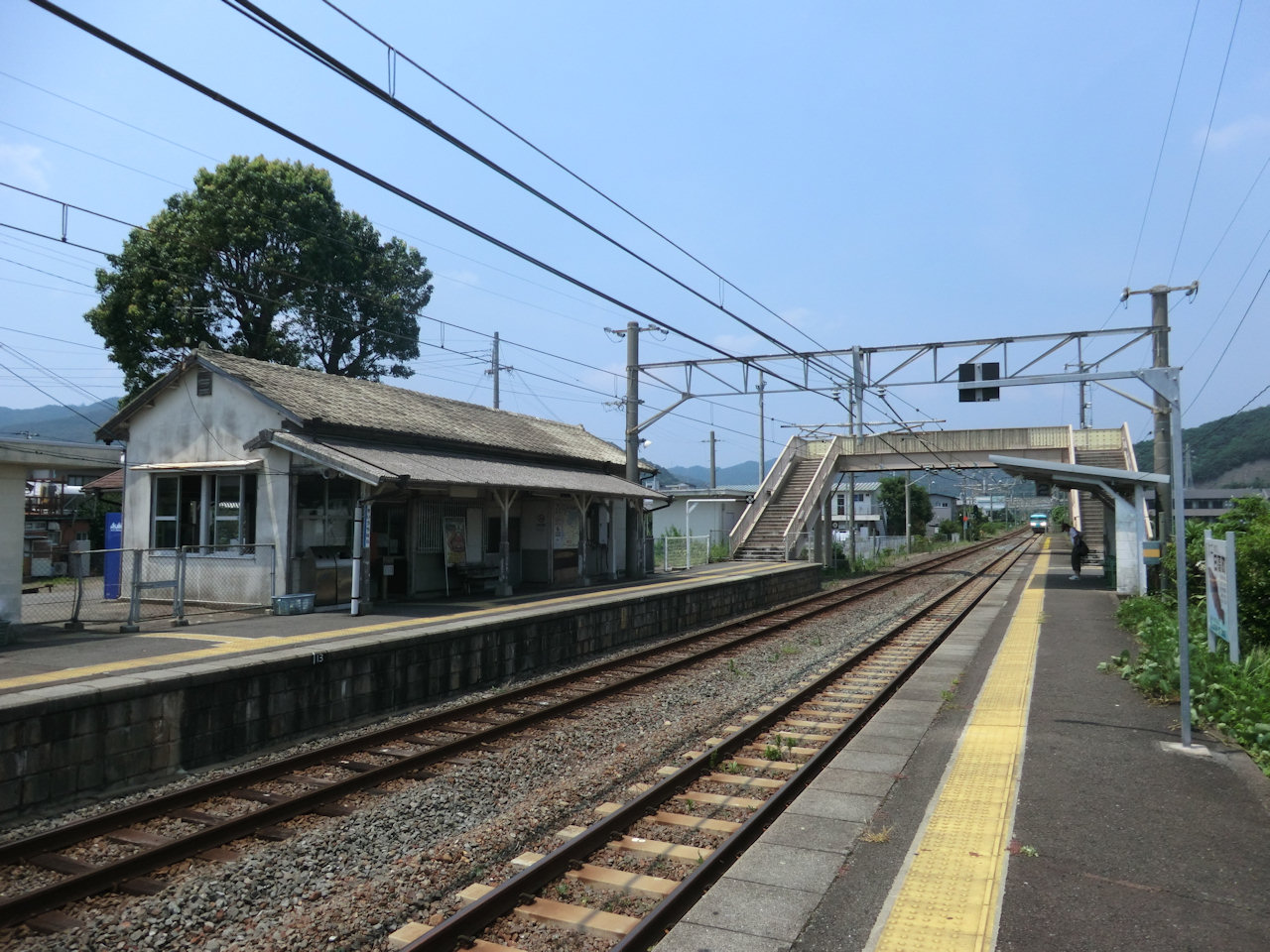
- Kii-Uchihara Station in July 2012

General information
- Location: 1426-2 Hagiwara, Hidaka-cho, Hidaka-gun, Wakayama-ken 649-1202; Japan
- Coordinates: 33.9259°N 135.1452°E
- System: JR-West commuter rail station
- Owner: West Japan Railway Company
- Operator: West Japan Railway Company
- Line: W Kisei Main Line (Kinokuni Line)
- Distance: 329.2 km (204.6 miles) from Kameyama; 149.0 km (92.6 miles) from Shingū
- Platforms: 2 side platforms
- Tracks: 2
- Train operators: West Japan Railway Company

Construction
- Structure type: At grade
- Accessible: None

Other information
- Status: Unstaffed
- Website: Official website

History
- Opened: 21 April 1929
- Electrified: 1978

Passengers
- FY2019: 198 daily
Services
Preceding station	JR-West	Following station
W Kisei Main Line (Kinokuni Line)
Limited Express Kuroshio: Does not stop at this station
Gobō	Rapid	Kii-Yura
Gobō	Local	Kii-Yura
Location
- Location within Wakayama Prefecture Location within Japan

Kii-Uchihara Station (紀伊内原駅, Kii-Uchihara-eki) is a passenger railway station in located in the town of Hidaka, Hidaka District, Wakayama Prefecture, Japan, operated by West Japan Railway Company (JR West).

== Lines ==
Kii-Uchihara Station is served by the Kisei Main Line (Kinokuni Line), and is located 329.2 kilometers from the terminus of the line at Kameyama Station and 149.0 kilometers from Shingū.

== Station layout ==
The station consists of two opposed side platforms connected to the station building by a footbridge. The station is unattended.

=== Platforms ===
1	■ W Kisei Main Line (Kinokuni Line)	for Wakayama and Tennōji
2	■ W Kisei Main Line (Kinokuni Line)	for Gobō and Shingū

== Adjacent stations ==
«	Service	»
West Japan Railway Company (JR West)
Kisei Main Line
Limited Express Kuroshio: Does not stop at this station
Rapid: Does not stop at this station
Gobō	Local	Kii-Yura

== History ==
Kii-Uchihara Station opened on April 21, 1929. With the privatization of the Japan National Railways (JNR) on April 1, 1987, the station came under the aegis of the West Japan Railway Company.

== Passenger statistics ==
In fiscal 2019, the station was used by an average of 198 passengers daily (boarding passengers only).

== Surrounding Area ==
- National Route 42
- Hidaka Town Hall
- Uchihara Elementary School

== See also ==
- List of railway stations in Japan
