= Inahara Station =

Railway station in Inami, Wakayama Prefecture, Japan

Inahara Station 稲原駅
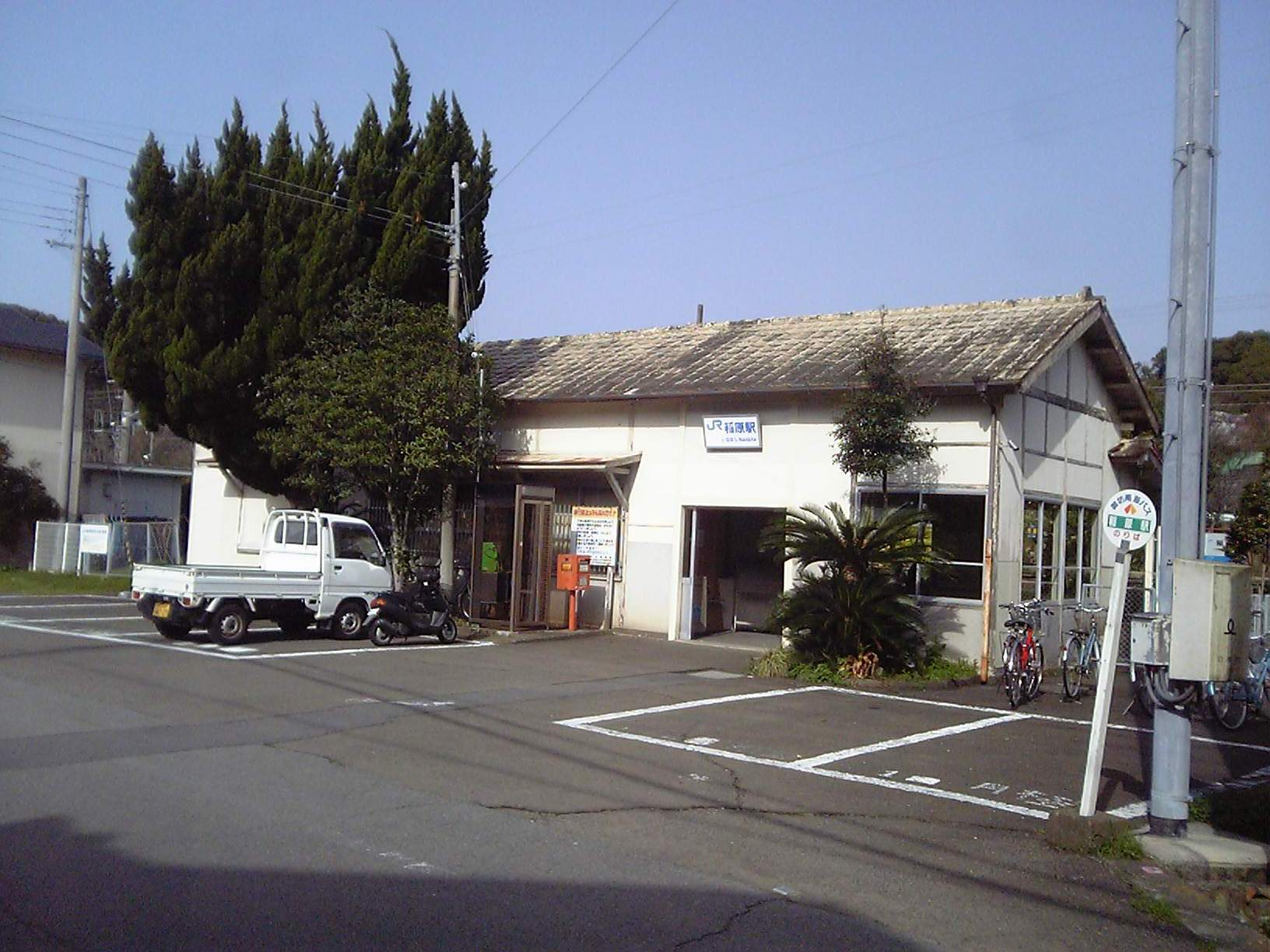
- Inahara Station in March 2010

General information
- Location: 1047-2 Inahara, Inami-cho, Hidaka-gun, Wakayama-ken 649-1532; Japan
- Coordinates: 33.8528°N 135.2288°E
- System: JR-West commuter rail station
- Owner: West Japan Railway Company
- Operator: West Japan Railway Company
- Line: W Kisei Main Line (Kinokuni Line)
- Distance: 305.5 km (189.8 miles) from Kameyama; 125.3 km (77.9 miles) from Shingū
- Platforms: 2 side platforms
- Tracks: 2
- Train operators: West Japan Railway Company

Construction
- Structure type: At grade
- Accessible: None

Other information
- Status: Unstaffed
- Website: Official website

History
- Opened: 14 December 1930
- Electrified: 1978

Passengers
- FY2019: 68 daily
Services
Preceding station	JR-West	Following station
W Kisei Main Line (Kinokuni Line)
Limited Express Kuroshio: Does not stop at this station
Inami	Rapid	Wasa
Inami	Local	Wasa
Location
- Location within Wakayama Prefecture Location within Japan

Inahara Station (稲原駅, Inahara-eki) is a passenger railway station in located in the town of Inami, Hidaka District, Wakayama Prefecture, Japan, operated by West Japan Railway Company (JR West).

== Lines ==
Inahara Station is served by the Kisei Main Line (Kinokuni Line), and is located 313.6 kilometers from the terminus of the line at Kameyama Station and 133.4 kilometers from Shingū.

== Station layout ==
The station consists of two opposed side platform s connected to the station building by a footbridge. The station is unattended.

=== Platforms ===
1	■ W Kisei Main Line (Kinokuni Line)	for Kii-Tanabe and Shingū
2	■ W Kisei Main Line (Kinokuni Line)	for Wakayama and Tennōji

== Adjacent stations ==
«	Service	»
West Japan Railway Company (JR West)
Kisei Main Line
Limited Express Kuroshio: Does not stop at this station
Inami	Rapid	Wasa
Inami	Local	Wasa

== History ==
Inahara Station opened on December 14, 1930. With the privatization of the Japan National Railways (JNR) on April 1, 1987, the station came under the aegis of the West Japan Railway Company.

== Passenger statistics ==
In fiscal 2019, the station was used by an average of 68 passengers daily (boarding passengers only).

== Surrounding Area ==
- Inami Municipal Inahara Elementary School
- Inami Municipal Inahara Junior High School
- Inahara Post Office

== See also ==
- List of railway stations in Japan
