= Kii-Yura Station =

Railway station in Yura, Wakayama Prefecture, Japan

Kii-Yura Station 紀伊由良駅
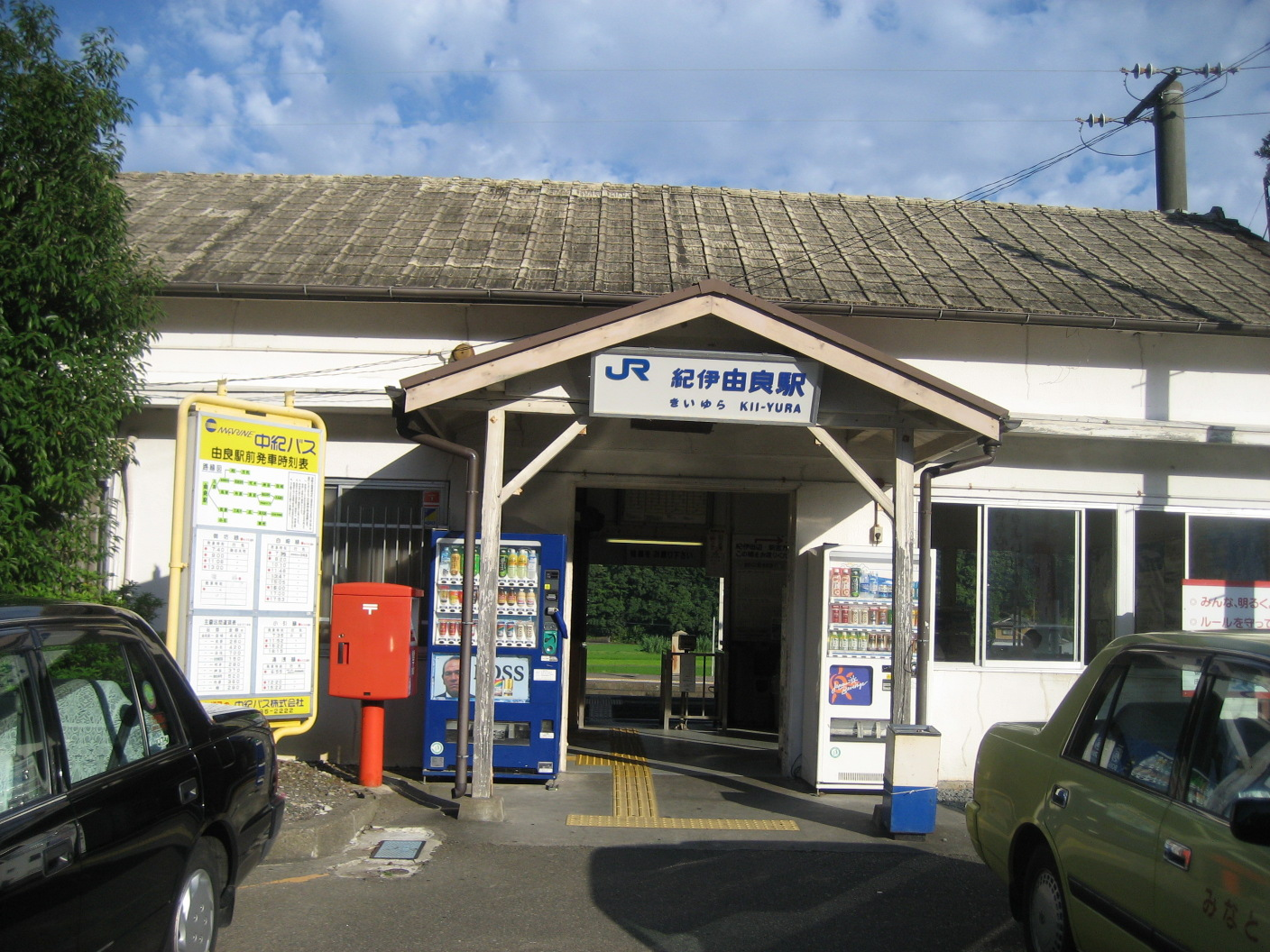
- Kii-Yura Station in July 2009

General information
- Location: 466-2 Sato, Yura-cho, Hidaka-gun, Wakayama-ken 649-1111; Japan
- Coordinates: 33.9689°N 135.1285°E
- System: JR-West commuter rail station
- Owner: West Japan Railway Company
- Operator: West Japan Railway Company
- Line: W Kisei Main Line (Kinokuni Line)
- Distance: 334.5 km (207.8 miles) from Kameyama; 154.3 km (95.9 miles) from Shingū
- Platforms: 1 side + 1 island platforms
- Tracks: 3
- Train operators: West Japan Railway Company

Construction
- Structure type: At grade
- Accessible: None

Other information
- Status: Unstaffed
- Website: Official website

History
- Opened: 28 October 1928
- Electrified: 1978

Passengers
- FY2019: 308 daily
Services
Preceding station	JR-West	Following station
W Kisei Main Line (Kinokuni Line)
Limited Express Kuroshio: Does not stop at this station
Gobō	Rapid	Yuasa
Kii-Uchihara	Local	Hirokawa Beach
Location
- Location within Wakayama Prefecture Location within Japan

Kii-Yura Station (紀伊由良駅, Kii-Yura-eki) is a passenger railway station in located in the town of Yura, Hidaka District, Wakayama Prefecture, Japan, operated by West Japan Railway Company (JR West).

== Lines ==
Kii-Yura Station is served by the Kisei Main Line (Kinokuni Line), and is located 334.5 kilometers from the terminus of the line at Kameyama Station and 154.3 kilometers from Shingū.

== Station layout ==
The station consists of two opposed side platforms connected to the station building by a footbridge. The station is unattended.

=== Platforms ===
1	■ W Kisei Main Line (Kinokuni Line)	for Wakayama and Tennōji
2, 3	■ W Kisei Main Line (Kinokuni Line)	for Gobō and Shingū

== Adjacent stations ==
«	Service	»
West Japan Railway Company (JR West)
Kisei Main Line
Limited Express Kuroshio: Does not stop at this station
Gobō	Rapid	Yuasa
Kii-Uchihara	Local	Hirokawa Beach

== History ==
Kii-Yura Station opened on October 28, 1928. With the privatization of the Japan National Railways (JNR) on April 1, 1987, the station came under the aegis of the West Japan Railway Company.

== Passenger statistics ==
In fiscal 2019, the station was used by an average of 308 passengers daily (boarding passengers only).

== Surrounding Area ==
- National Route 42
- Kokokuji Temple
- Yura Town Hall
- Shirasaki Marine Park

== See also ==
- List of railway stations in Japan
