= Yuasa Station =

Railway station in Yuasa, Wakayama Prefecture, Japan

Yuasa Station 湯浅駅
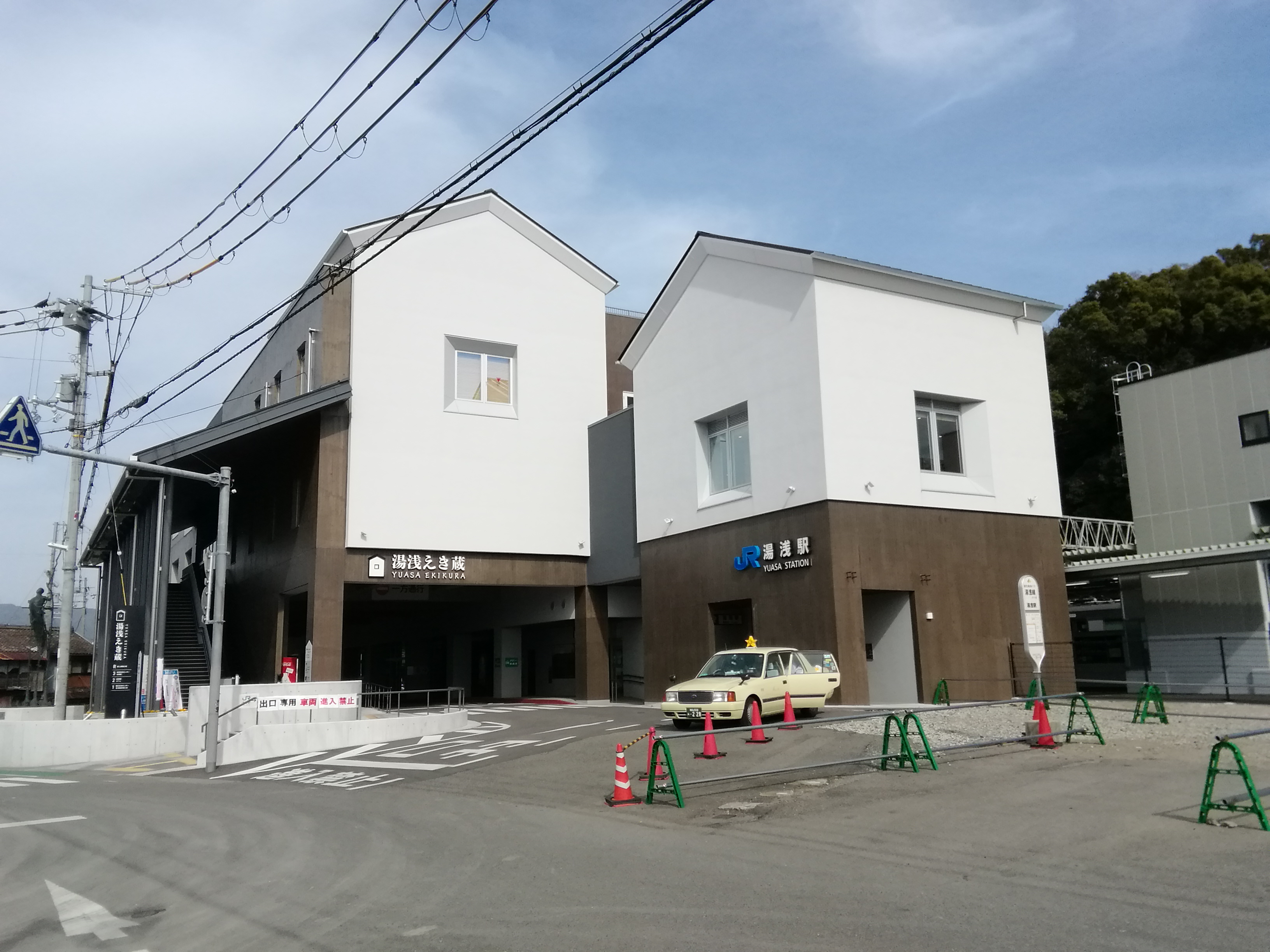
- Yuasa Station in 2020

General information
- Location: 1100 Yuasa, Yuasa-cho, Arida-gun, Wakayama-ken 643-0004; Japan
- Coordinates: 34.0321°N 135.1802°E
- System: JR-West commuter rail station
- Owner: West Japan Railway Company
- Operator: West Japan Railway Company
- Line: W Kisei Main Line (Kinokuni Line)
- Distance: 343.9 km (213.7 miles) from Kameyama; 163.7 km (101.7 miles) from Shingū
- Platforms: 1 side + 1 island platforms
- Tracks: 2
- Train operators: West Japan Railway Company

Construction
- Structure type: At grade

Other information
- Status: Unstaffed
- Website: Official website

History
- Opened: 14 August 1927
- Electrified: 1978

Passengers
- FY2019: 1006 daily
Services
Preceding station	JR-West	Following station
W Kisei Main Line (Kinokuni Line)
Gobo	Limited Express Kuroshio	Fujinami
Kii-Yura	Rapid	Fujinami
Hirokawa Beach	Local	Fujinami
Location
- Location within Wakayama Prefecture Location within Japan

Yuasa Station (湯浅駅, Yuasa-eki) is a passenger railway station in located in the town of Yuasa, Arida District, Wakayama Prefecture, Japan, operated by West Japan Railway Company (JR West).

== Lines ==
Yuasa Station is served by the Kisei Main Line (Kinokuni Line), and is located 343.9 kilometers from the terminus of the line at Kameyama Station and 163.7 kilometers from Shingū.

== Station layout ==
The station consists of one side platform and one island platform connected to the station building by a footbridge. The station is unattended.

=== Platforms ===
1	■ W Kisei Main Line (Kinokuni Line)	for Wakayama and Tennōji
2	■ W Kisei Main Line (Kinokuni Line)	for Wakayama and Tennōji (starting trains) for Gobō and Shingū
3	■ W Kisei Main Line (Kinokuni Line)	for Gobō and Shingū

== Adjacent stations ==
«	Service	»
West Japan Railway Company (JR West)
Kisei Main Line
Gobo	Limited Express Kuroshio	Fujinami
Kii-Yura	Rapid	Fujinami
Hirokawa Beach	Local	Fujinami

== History ==
Yuasa Station opened on August 14, 1927 as Kii-Yuasa Station (紀伊湯浅駅). It was renamed to its present name on March 1, 1965. With the privatization of the Japan National Railways (JNR) on April 1, 1987, the station came under the aegis of the West Japan Railway Company.

== Passenger statistics ==
In fiscal 2019, the station was used by an average of 1006 passengers daily (boarding passengers only).

== Surrounding Area ==
- Yuasa old town (National Important Preservation District for Traditional Buildings)
- Yuasa Town Hall
- Yuasa Castle Ruins
- Yuasa Municipal Yuasa Elementary School

== See also ==
- List of railway stations in Japan
