= Wasa Station =

Railway station in Hidakagawa, Wakayama Prefecture, Japan

Wasa Station 和佐駅
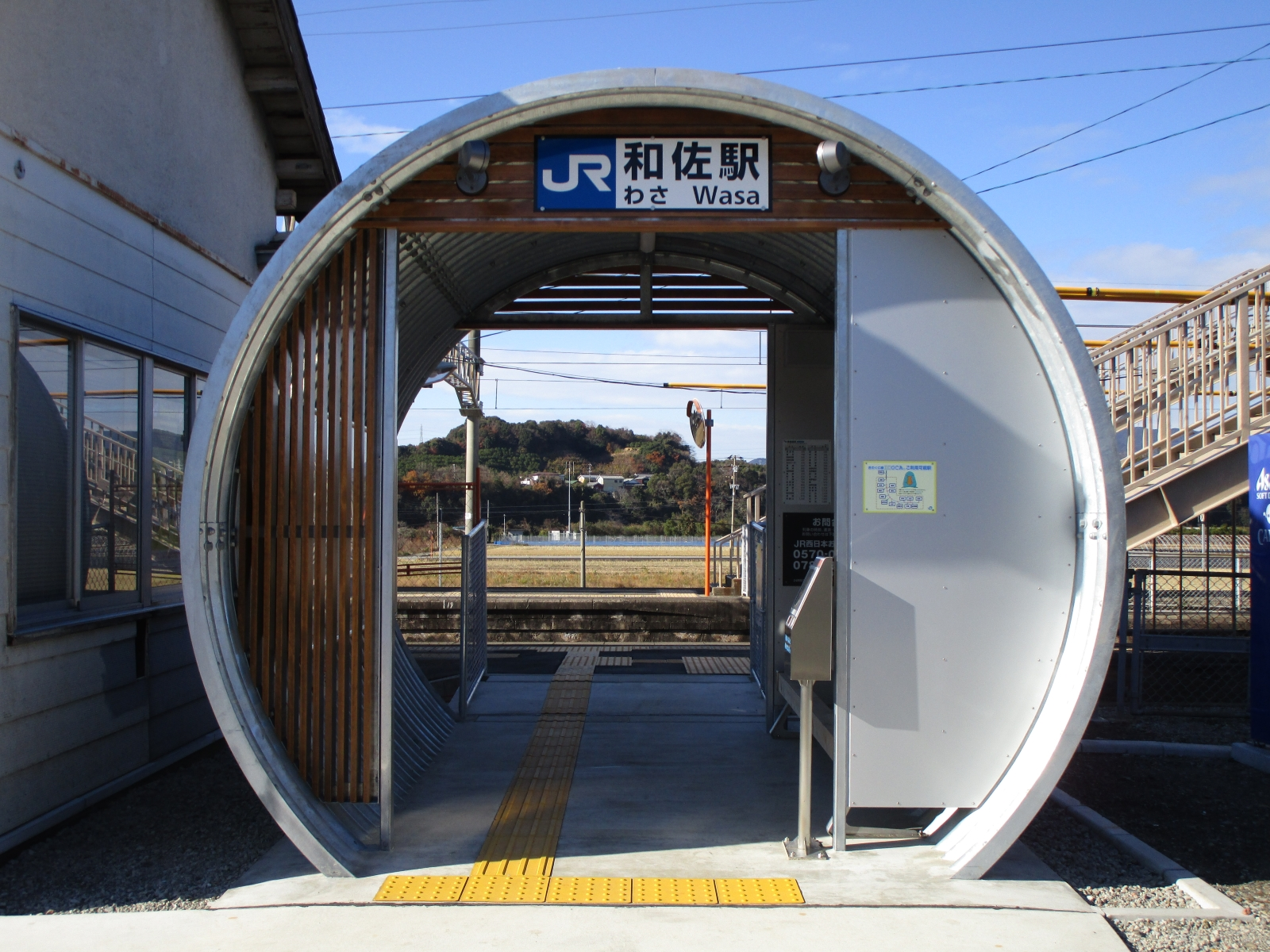
- Wasa Station in February 2016

General information
- Location: 1426-2 Wasa, Hidakagawa-cho, Hidaka-gun, Wakayam-kena 649-1443; Japan
- Coordinates: 33.8974°N 135.2069°E
- System: JR-West commuter rail station
- Owner: West Japan Railway Company
- Operator: West Japan Railway Company
- Line: W Kisei Main Line (Kinokuni Line)
- Distance: 320.4 km (199.1 miles) from Kameyama; 140.2 km (87.1 miles) from Shingū
- Platforms: 1 side + 1 island platform
- Tracks: 3
- Train operators: West Japan Railway Company

Construction
- Structure type: At grade
- Accessible: None

Other information
- Status: Unstaffed
- Website: Official website

History
- Opened: 14 December 1930
- Electrified: 1978

Passengers
- FY2019: 72 daily
Services
Preceding station	JR-West	Following station
W Kisei Main Line (Kinokuni Line)
Limited Express Kuroshio: Does not stop at this station
Inahara	Rapid	Dōjōji
Inahara	Local	Dōjōji
Location
- Location within Wakayama Prefecture Location within Japan

Wasa Station (和佐駅, Wasa-eki) is a passenger railway station in located in the town of Hidakagawa, Hidaka District, Wakayama Prefecture, Japan, operated by West Japan Railway Company (JR West).

== Lines ==
Wasa Station is served by the Kisei Main Line (Kinokuni Line), and is located 320.4 kilometers from the terminus of the line at Kameyama Station and 140.2 kilometers from Shingū.

== Station layout ==
The station consists of one side platform and one island platform connected to the station building by a footbridge. The station is unattended.

=== Platforms ===
1	■ W Kisei Main Line (Kinokuni Line)	for Kii-Tanabe and Shingū
2	■ W Kisei Main Line (Kinokuni Line)	for Wakayama and Tennōji

== Adjacent stations ==
«	Service	»
West Japan Railway Company (JR West)
Kisei Main Line
Limited Express Kuroshio: Does not stop at this station
Inahara	Rapid	Dōjōji
Inahara	Local	Dōjōji

== History ==
Wasa Station opened on December 14, 1930. With the privatization of the Japan National Railways (JNR) on April 1, 1987, the station came under the aegis of the West Japan Railway Company.

== Passenger statistics ==
In fiscal 2019, the station was used by an average of 72 passengers daily (boarding passengers only).

== Surrounding area ==
- Wakayama Nanryo High School
- Hidakagawa Town Tanyu Junior High School
- Wasa Elementary School, Hidakagawa Town
- Hidakagawa Municipal Ekawa Elementary School

== See also ==
- List of railway stations in Japan
