= Inami Station =

Railway station in Inami, Wakayama Prefecture, Japan

Inami Station 印南駅
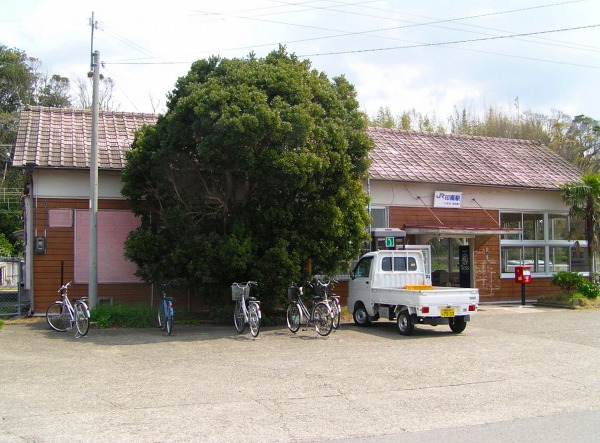
- Inami Station in April 2004

General information
- Location: 2645-2 Inami, Inami-cho, Hidaka-gun, Wakayama-ken 649-1534; Japan
- Coordinates: 33.8189°N 135.2201°E
- System: JR-West commuter rail station
- Owner: West Japan Railway Company
- Operator: West Japan Railway Company
- Line: W Kisei Main Line (Kinokuni Line)
- Distance: 309.3 km (192.2 miles) from Kameyama; 129.1 km (80.2 miles) from Shingū
- Platforms: 1 side + 1 island platform
- Tracks: 3
- Train operators: West Japan Railway Company

Construction
- Structure type: At grade

Other information
- Status: Unstaffed
- Website: Official website

History
- Opened: 14 December 1930
- Electrified: 1978

Passengers
- FY2019: 155 daily
Location
- Location within Wakayama Prefecture Location within Japan

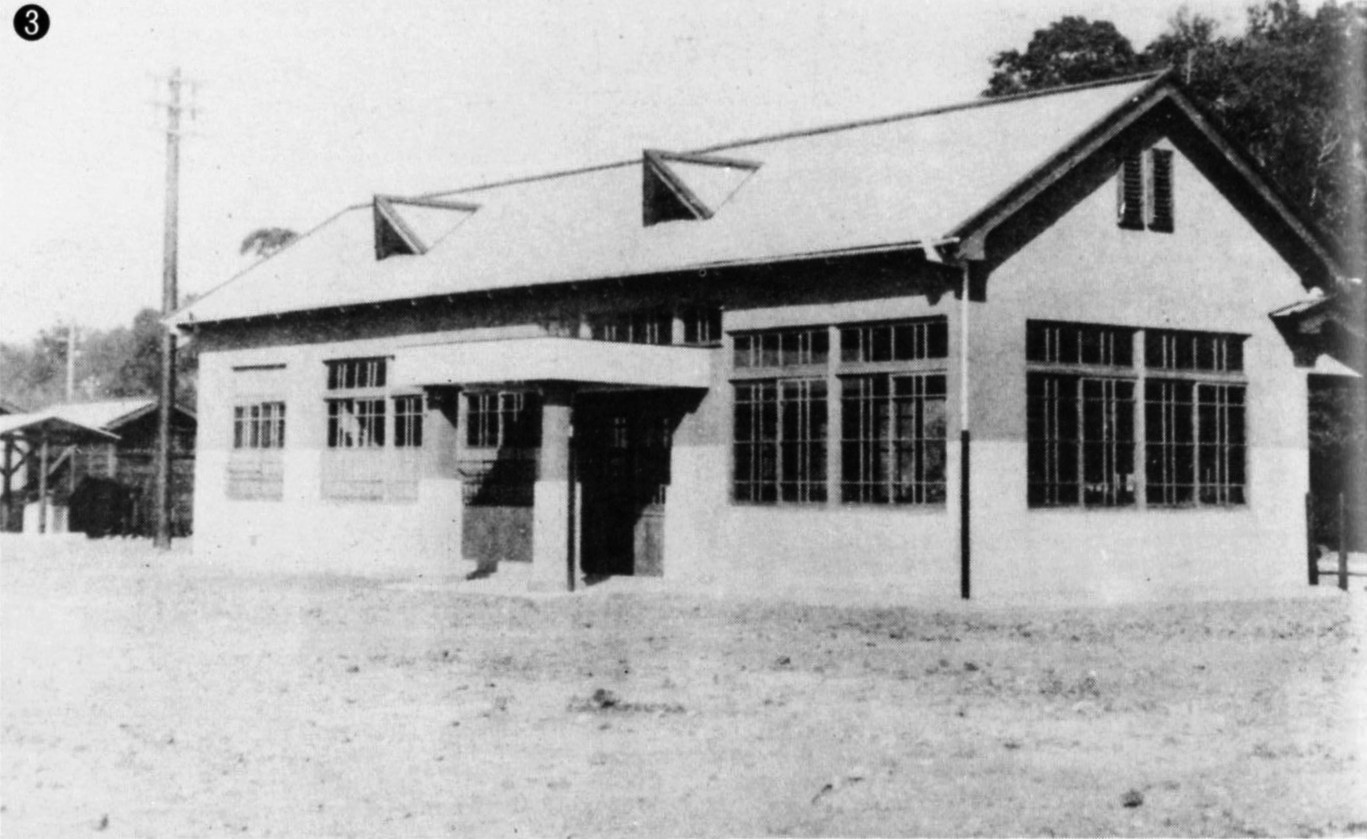
Inami Station in 1935

Inami Station (印南駅, Inami-eki) is a passenger railway station in located in the town of Inami, Hidaka District, Wakayama Prefecture, Japan, operated by West Japan Railway Company (JR West).

== Lines ==
Inami Station is served by the Kisei Main Line (Kinokuni Line), and is located 309.3 kilometers from the terminus of the line at Kameyama Station and 129.1 kilometers from Shingū.

== Station layout ==
The station consists of one side platform and one island platform connected to the station building by a footbridge. The station is staffed.

=== Platforms ===
1	■ W Kisei Main Line (Kinokuni Line)	for Wakayama and Tennōji
2	■ W Kisei Main Line (Kinokuni Line)	for express services only
3	■ W Kisei Main Line (Kinokuni Line)	for Kii-Tanabe and Shingū

== Adjacent stations ==
«	Service	»
West Japan Railway Company (JR West)
Kisei Main Line
Limited Express Kuroshio: Does not stop at this station
Kirime	Rapid	Inahara
Kirime	Local	Inahara

== History ==
Inami Station opened on December 14, 1930. With the privatization of the Japan National Railways (JNR) on April 1, 1987, the station came under the aegis of the West Japan Railway Company.

== Passenger statistics ==
In fiscal 2019, the station was used by an average of 155 passengers daily (boarding passengers only).

== Surrounding area ==
- National Route 42
- Inami Town Hall
- Inami Elementary School
- Inami Municipal Inami Junior High School
- Inami Post Office

== See also ==
- List of railway stations in Japan
