= Kishū Railway Line =

Railway line in Wakayama Prefecture, Japan

Kishu Railway Line
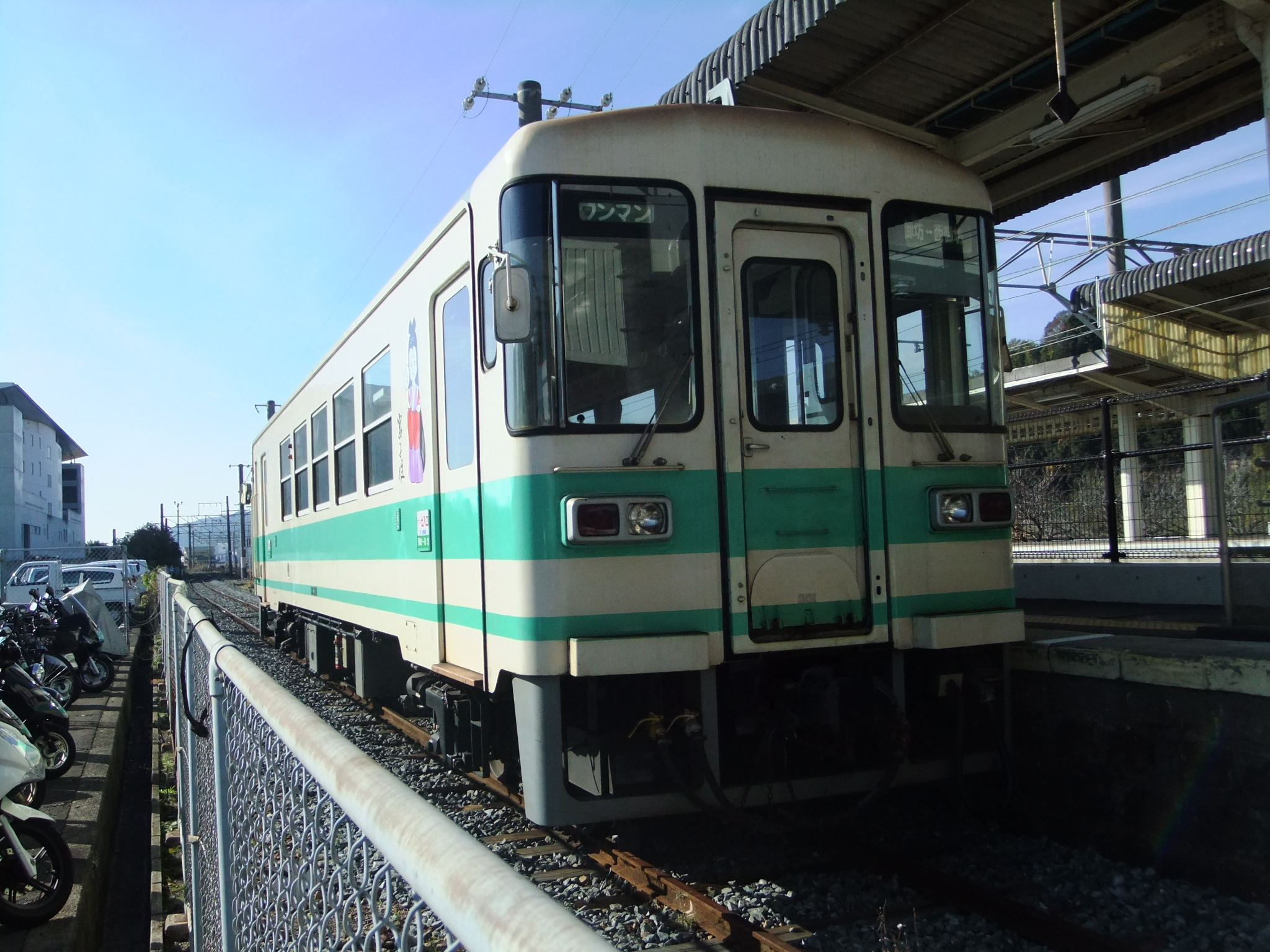
- KR301 train at Gobō Station in 2016

Overview
- Native name: 紀州鉄道線
- Owner: Kishu Railway
- Locale: Wakayama Prefecture, Japan
- Termini: Gobō Station; Nishi-Gobō Station
- Stations: 5

Service
- Rolling stock: KR205, KR301

History
- Opened: 15 June 1931

Technical
- Line length: 2.7 km (1.7 mi)
- Number of tracks: 1
- Track gauge: 1,067 mm (3 ft 6 in)

The Kishu Railway Line (紀州鉄道線, Kishū Tetsudō-sen) is a railway line in Japan, running from Gobō Station to Nishi-Gobō Station. The railway line is operated by Kishu Railway (紀州鉄道, Kishū Tetsudō), and is also referred to by locals as Kitetsu (紀鉄), which is an abbreviation of the company's name. The railway line is located entirely within Gobō, Wakayama. It is the only remaining private railway line in Wakayama Prefecture that is entirely non-electrified, and is the second-shortest railway line in Japan.

== History ==
The Gobō Rinkō Railway (御坊臨港鉄道, Gobō Rinkō Tetsudō; "Gobō Portside Railway") opened the 1.8 km section from Gobō to Kii-Gobō section on 15 June 1931, extended 0.9 km to Nishi-Gobō on 10 April 1932, and to Hidakagawa on 10 August 1934.

The Gobō Rinkō Railway became the Kishu Railway from 1 January 1973. Shiyakusho-mae and Gakumon were opened on 1 October 1966 and 10 August 1979. The 0.7 km section from Nishi-Gobō to Hidakagawa closed on 1 April 1989. Work began to replace crossties in the line to concrete ones in 2017 following a derail, which was attributed to the old wooden crossties.

In December 2022, a Chinese real estate company bought Kishu Railway, which attempted to close the railway due to its deficit. The railway was unable to raise their fares as nobody in the company were able to write an application to the Ministry of Land, Infrastructure, Transport and Tourism. As a result, the railway was to be closed by 2026, which did not occur as the company instead opted to transfer the line to a different entity in June 2026.

== Operation ==
Trains stop at all stations along the line. The entire line is single-track, unelectrified, and none of its railway stations have passing loops. The railway depot for the line is located adjacent to Kii-Gobō Station. Most trains are timetabled to allow for onward connections to the Kisei Main Line trains at Gobō.

The railway line is the only line operated by the company, as the company mostly focuses in the real estate and hotel sectors. A Tokyo-based company, which was previously not a railway operator, took over the line in 1973 in order to gain the prestige and trust associated with operating a railway line. The railway is the second shortest railway line in service in Japan, the shortest being the Shibayama Railway.

=== Station list ===
Station name	Japanese name	Distance between stations (km)	Total distance (km)	Transfers
Gobō	御坊駅	-	0.0	JR West: Kisei Main Line
Gakumon	学門駅	1.5	1.5	
Kii-Gobō	紀伊御坊駅	0.3	1.8	
Shiyakusho-mae	市役所前駅	0.6	2.4	
Nishi-Gobō	西御坊駅	0.3	2.7	

=== Rolling stock ===
Diesel railcar KR301, formerly SKR301 used on the Shigaraki Kohgen Railway in Shiga Prefecture until October 2015 was introduced on the line from 30 January 2016. KR205, formerly SKR205 entered service on 15 April 2017. As of 2025, these two cars are the only trains operated by the company.

== See also ==
- List of railway companies in Japan
- List of railway lines in Japan
