= Gobō, Wakayama =

City in Wakayama Prefecture, Japan

Gobō 御坊市
- City
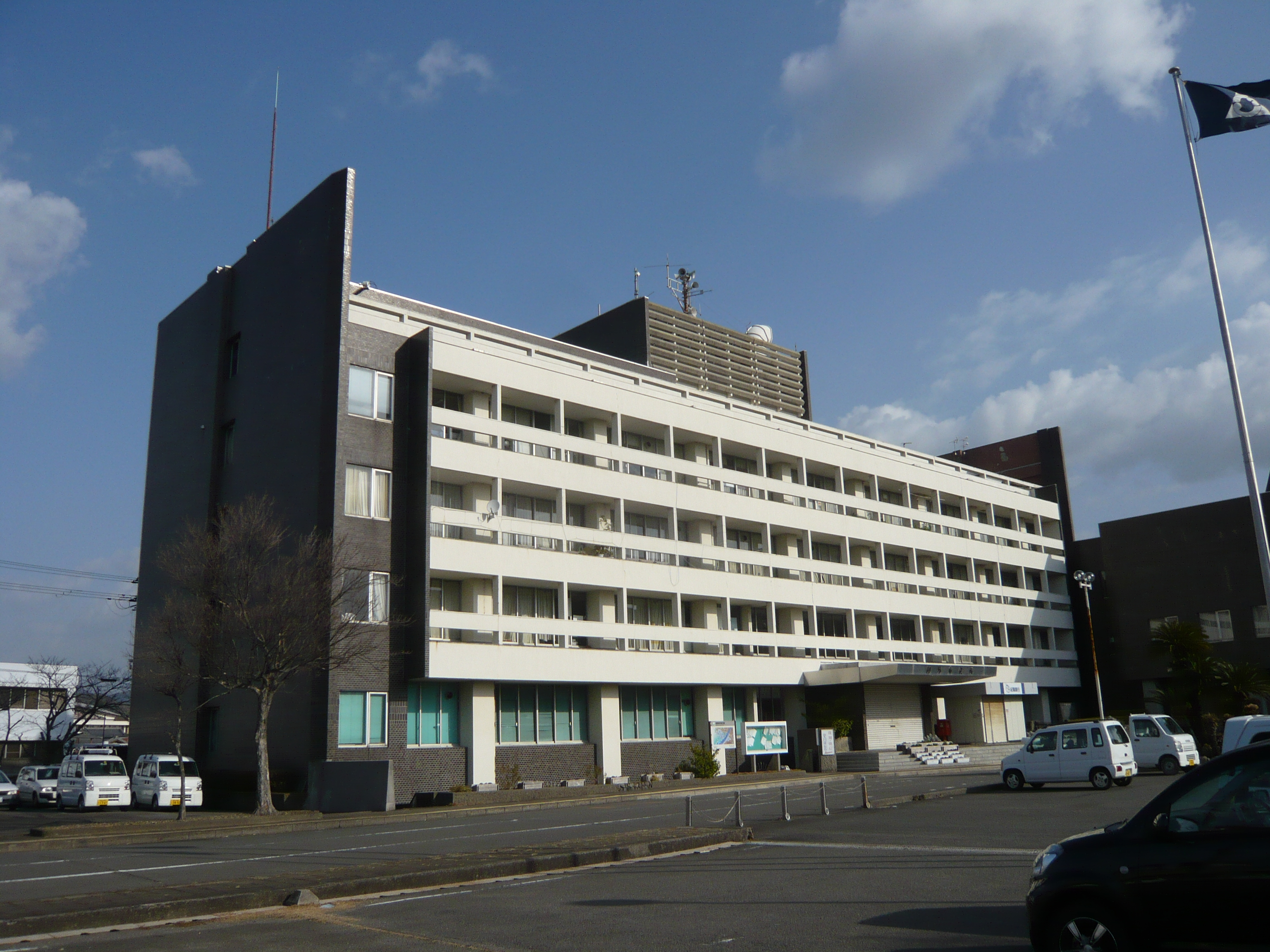
- Gobō City Hall

- Flag

- Location of Gobō in Wakayama Prefecture

- Location in Japan
- Coordinates: 33°53′N 135°9′E
- Country: Japan
- Region: Kansai
- Prefecture: Wakayama

Area
  - Total: 43.91 km^{2} (16.95 sq mi)

Population (May 2024)
  - Total: 21,260
  - Density: 484.2/km^{2} (1,254/sq mi)
- Time zone: UTC+09:00 (JST)
- City hall address: 350 Sono, Gobo-shi, Wakayama-ken 644-0002
- Website: Official website
- Symbols
- Flower: Hibiscus hamabo
- Tree: Kurogane Holly

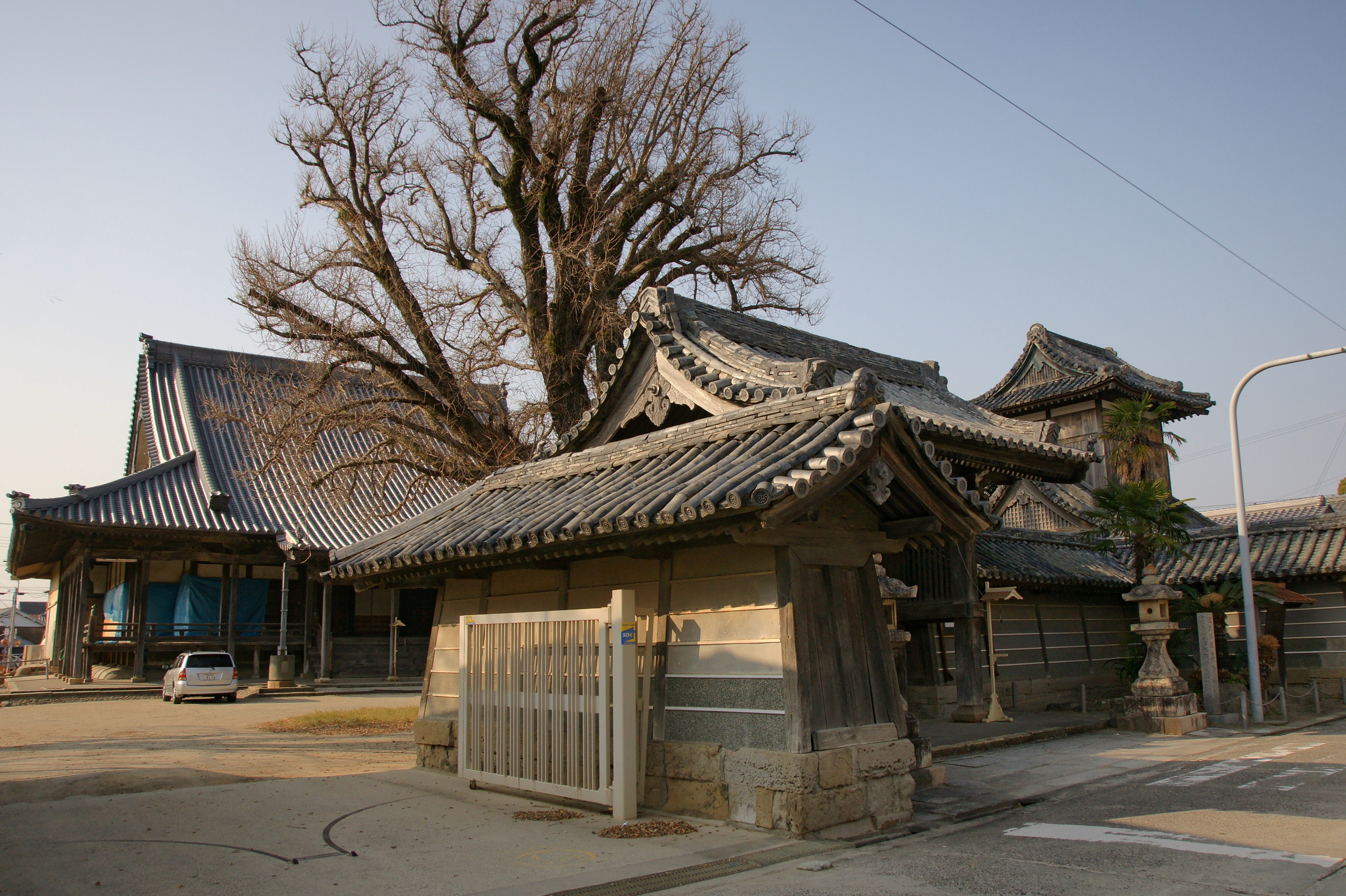
Hongan-ji Hidaka-betsuin

Gobō (御坊市, Gobō-shi) is a city located in Wakayama Prefecture, Japan. As of May 2024, the city had an estimated population of 21,260 in 10,801 households and a population density of 480 persons per km^{2}. The total area of the city is 43.91 square kilometres (16.95 sq mi).

== Geography ==
Gobō is located at the mouth of the Hidakagawa River, almost in the center of the coastline of Wakayama Prefecture. The terrain is long from north to south, and the part facing the Kii Channel is almost flat, but the east side of the city is mountainous. Due to the influence of the Kuroshio Current, the city enjoys a mild climate.

=== Neighboring municipalities ===
Wakayama Prefecture

- Inami
- Hidaka
- Hidakagawa
- Mihama

== Climate ==
Gobō has a Humid subtropical climate (Köppen Cfa) characterized by warm summers and cool winters with light to no snowfall. The average annual temperature in Gobō is 15.9 °C. The average annual rainfall is 1878 mm with September as the wettest month. The temperatures are highest on average in August, at around 26.1 °C, and lowest in January, at around 6.1 °C. The area is subject to typhoons in summer.

== Demographics ==
Per Japanese census data, the population of Gobō has been declining steadily over the past 40 years.

Historical population
Year	Pop.	±%
1960	30,700	—
1970	30,573	−0.4%
1980	30,393	−0.6%
1990	29,133	−4.1%
2000	28,034	−3.8%
2010	26,106	−6.9%
2020	23,481	−10.1%

== History ==
The area of the modern city of Gobō was within ancient Kii Province. The village of Gobō was established with the creation of the modern municipalities system on April 1, 1889. It took its name from a branch temple of Nishi Hongan-ji, the Hidaka-Gobō, which had been built at this location in 1528, and which was known locally as "Gobō-sama". The village was raised to town status on February 1, 1897. Gobō merged with the villages of Fujita, Noguchi, Nada and Shioya to form the city of Gobō on April 1, 1954.

Gobo Festival (御坊祭) is held annually on the 4th and 5 October at Shinohachiman Shrine.

== Government ==
Gobō has a mayor-council form of government with a directly elected mayor and a unicameral city council of 14 members. Gobō contributes one member to the Wakayama Prefectural Assembly. In terms of national politics, the city is part of Wakayama 3rd district of the lower house of the Diet of Japan.

== Economy ==
In ancient times, Gobō developed as a distribution center for timber transported by the Hidaka River and as a fishing port. Commercial fishing, especially for horse mackerel, abalone and spiny lobster remains important, as does agriculture, especially the production of cut flowers. Gobō's slogan is "Hanamaru Gobō", linking the city with flowers. The city's greenhouses produce a wide range of blooms, supplying the Japanese market, and its official flower is the Hibiscus hamabo, a kind of hollyhock growing up to 3 to 5 metres (9.8 to 16.4 ft) in height, and bearing yellow flowers in the summer. The hibiscus are found at the mouth of the Hidaka River with its warmer microclimate. In terms of industry, Hidaka Port corporate site and Gobo Industrial Park in the Shioya district in the southern part of the city, forming the industrial area. This includes the production of mahjong tiles by Taiyo Kagaku, which has a near monopoly on the Japanese domestic market. The Kansai Electric Gobō Thermal Power Plant is located in Gobō.

== Education ==
Gobō has six public elementary schools and four public middle schools operated by the city government and four public high schools operated by the Wakayama Prefectural Department of Education. The city also has one private/middle school. The prefecture also operates one vocational education school.

== Transportation ==
=== Railway ===
JR West – Kisei Main Line

- Dōjōji - Gobō

Kishū Railway - Kishū Railway Line

- Gobō - Gakumon - Kii-Gobō - Shiyakusho-mae - Nishi-Gobō

=== Highway ===
- Hanwa Expressway
- National Route 42
- National Route 425

== Local attractions ==
Gobō has "Gobō Synthesis Sport Park". This park has a baseball ground and multipurpose ground, training place and more. It is a popular relaxation spot among the locals.

== Notable people ==
- Kimurayama Mamoru (1981–2024), sumo wrestler
