= Hidaka, Wakayama =

Hidaka 日高町
- Town
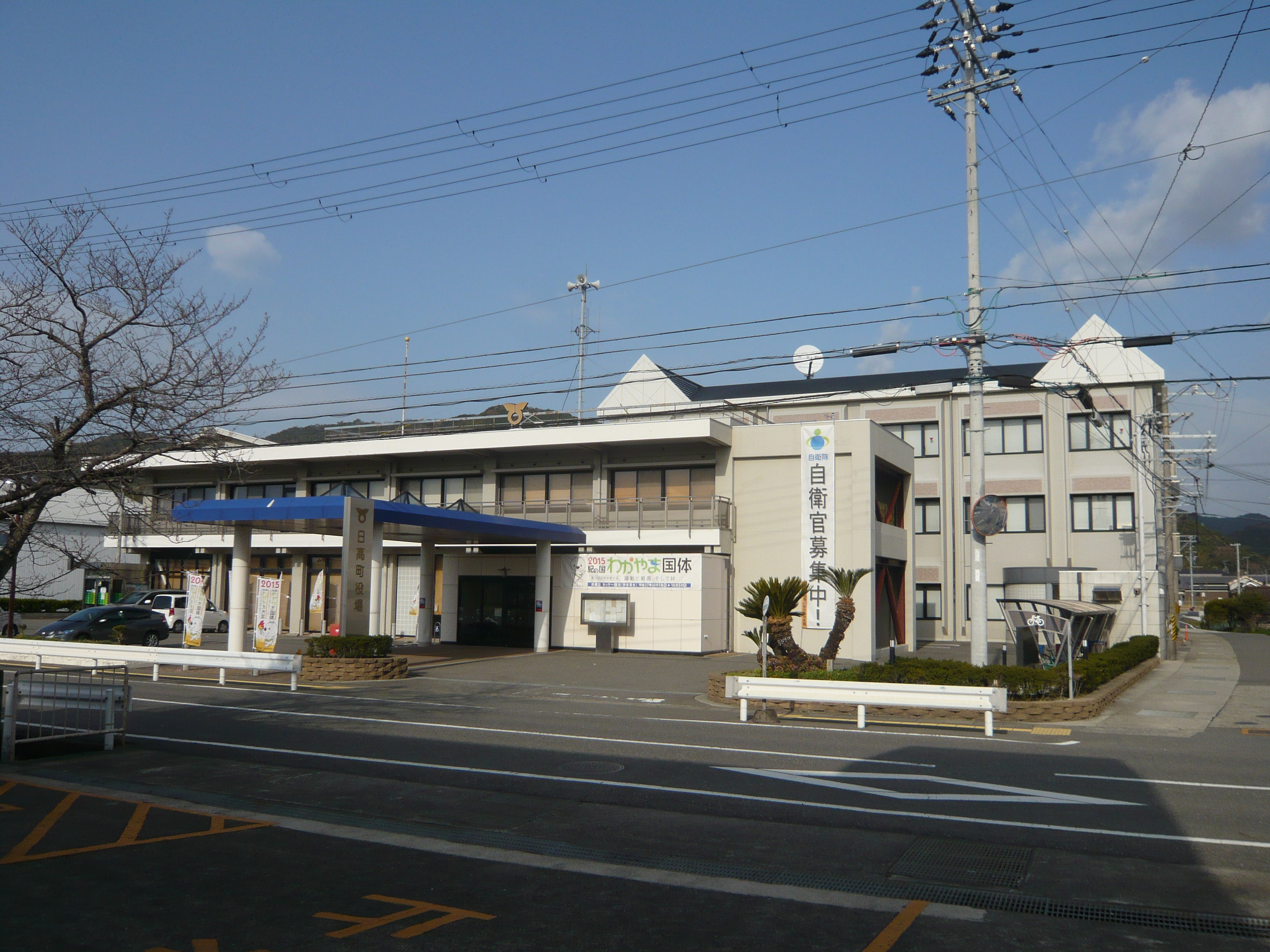
- Hidaka Town Hall

- Flag Emblem

- Location of Hidaka in Wakayama Prefecture

- Location in Japan
- Coordinates: 33°56′N 135°08′E
- Country: Japan
- Region: Kansai
- Prefecture: Wakayama
- District: Hidaka

Area
  - Total: 46.19 km^{2} (17.83 sq mi)

Population (November 30, 2021)
  - Total: 7,970
  - Density: 173/km^{2} (447/sq mi)
- Time zone: UTC+09:00 (JST)
- City hall address: 626 Takaya, Hidaka-cho, Hidaka-gun, Wakayama-ken 649-1213
- Website: Official website
- Symbols
- Flower: Lespedeza
- Tree: Ficus superba

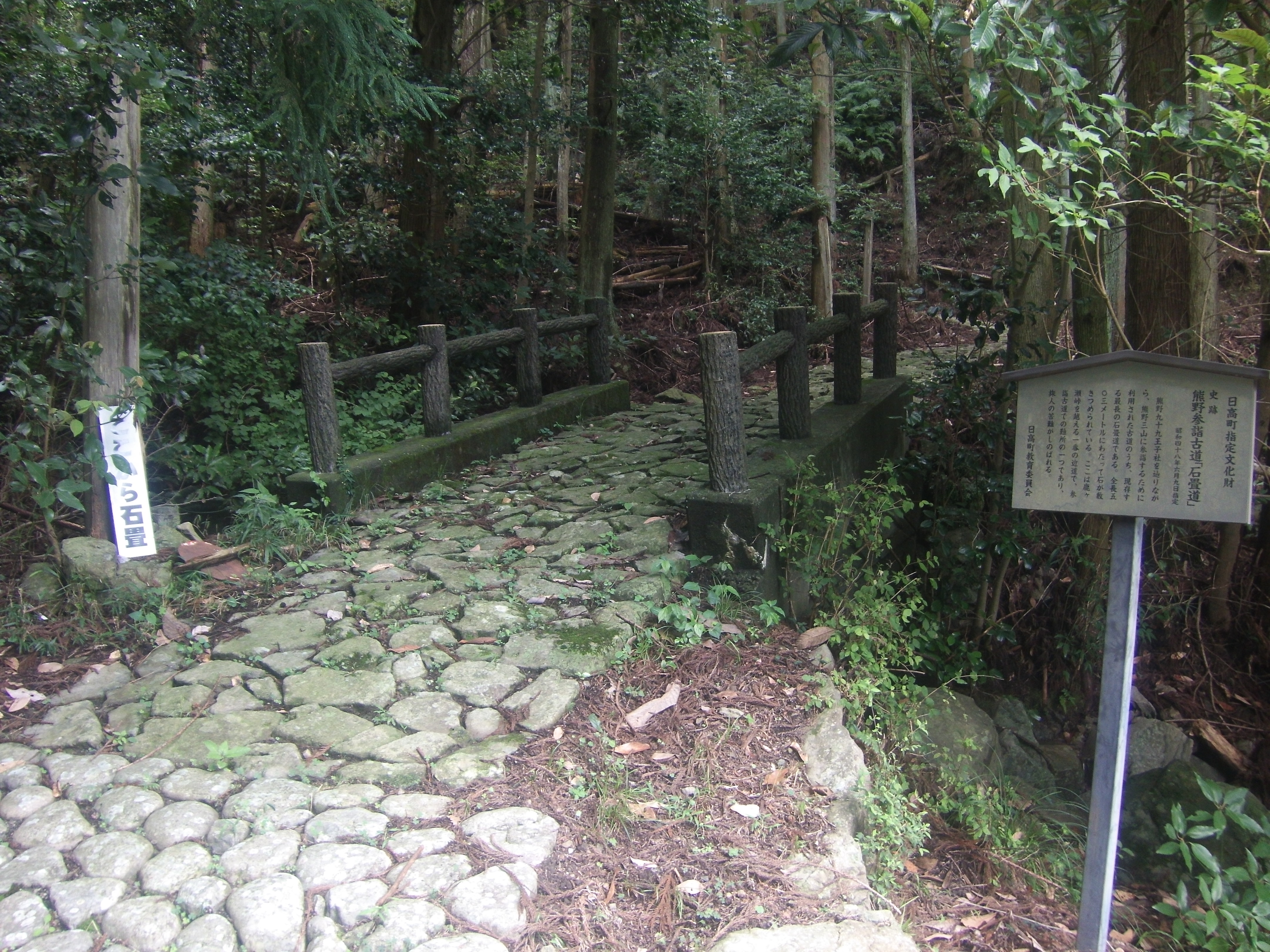
Kumano Kodo at Hidaka

Hidaka (日高町, Hidaka-chō) is a town located in Hidaka District, Wakayama Prefecture, Japan. As of 30 November 2021, the town had an estimated population of 7,970 in 3266 households and a population density of 170 persons per km^{2}. The total area of the town is 46.19 square kilometres (17.83 sq mi).

== Geography ==
Hidaka is located on the coast in central Wakayama Prefecture, facing the Kii Channel. The coastline is a ria coast and the climate is mild.

=== Neighboring municipalities ===
Wakayama Prefecture

- Gobō
- Hidakagawa
- Hirogawa
- Mihama
- Yura

== Climate ==
Hidaka has a humid subtropical climate (Köppen Cfa) characterized by warm summers and cool winters with light to no snowfall. The average annual temperature in Hidaka is 16.8 °C. The average annual rainfall is 1878 mm with September as the wettest month. The temperatures are highest on average in August, at around 26.7 °C, and lowest in January, at around 7.3 °C. The area is subject to typhoons in summer.

== Demographics ==
Per Japanese census data, the population of Hidaka has remained fairly steady over the past century.

Historical population
Year	Pop.	±%
1920	6,927	—
1930	7,322	+5.7%
1940	7,474	+2.1%
1950	9,243	+23.7%
1960	8,177	−11.5%
1970	7,119	−12.9%
1980	6,973	−2.1%
1990	6,862	−1.6%
2000	7,148	+4.2%
2010	7,433	+4.0%

== History ==
The area of the modern town of Hidaka was within ancient Kii Province. The villages of Shiga, Hizaki, Higashi-Uchihara and Nishi-Uchihara were established with the creation of the modern municipalities system on April 1, 1889. Higachi-Uchihara and Nishi-Uchihara merged on August 1, 1941, to form Uchihara Village. Uchihara merged with Shiga and Hizaki on October 1, 1954, to form the town of Hidaka.

== Government ==
Hidaka has a mayor-council form of government with a directly elected mayor and a unicameral city council of 12 members. Hidaka collectively with the other municipalities of Hidaka District, contributes three members to the Wakayama Prefectural Assembly. In terms of national politics, the town is part of Wakayama 3rd district of the lower house of the Diet of Japan.

== Economy ==
The economy of Hidaka is centered on commercial fishing and agriculture. The main crops are rice and vegetables in the flatlands and horticulture in the mountains. Plans by Kansai Electric to construct a nuclear power plant in Hidaka were cancelled due to vehement local opposition.

== Education ==
Hidaka has three public elementary schools and one public middle schools operated by the town government. The town does not have a high school.

== Transportation ==
=== Railway ===
JR West – Kisei Main Line

- Kii-Uchihara

=== Highways ===
- National Route 42

== Local attractions ==
- Shishigase Pass on the Kumano Kodo, National Historic Site and World Heritage Site
