= Mihama, Wakayama =

Mihama 美浜町
- Town
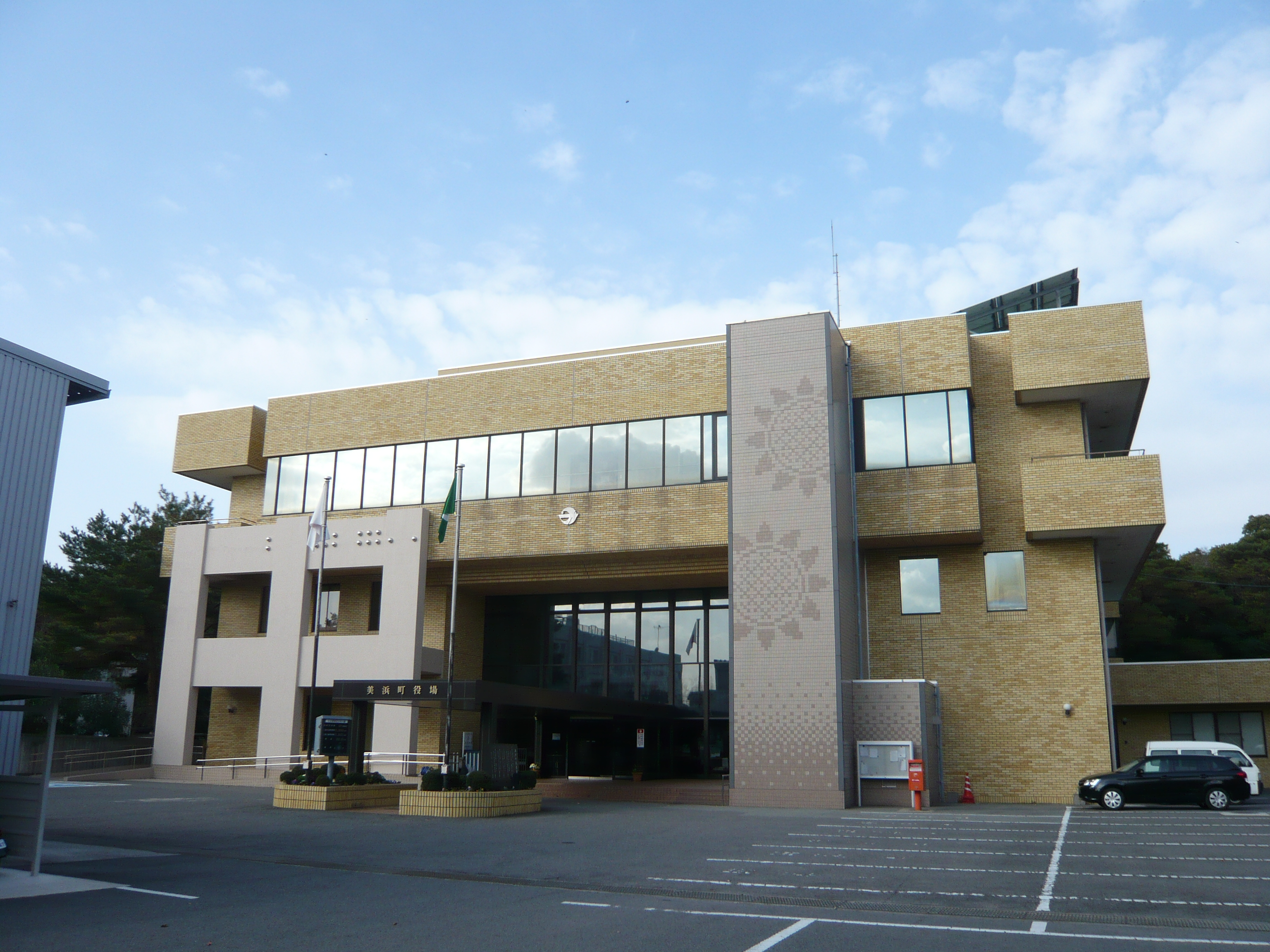
- Mihama town hall

- Flag Emblem

- Location of Mihama in Wakayama Prefecture

- Location in Japan
- Coordinates: 33°49′N 136°3′E
- Country: Japan
- Region: Kansai
- Prefecture: Wakayama
- District: Hidaka

Area
  - Total: 12.77 km^{2} (4.93 sq mi)

Population (December 1, 2021)
  - Total: 6,761
  - Density: 529.4/km^{2} (1,371/sq mi)
- Time zone: UTC+09:00 (JST)
- City hall address: 1138-278 Wada, Mihama-cho, Hidaka-gun, Wakayama-ken 644-0044
- Website: Official website
- Symbols
- Flower: Sunflower
- Tree: Pine

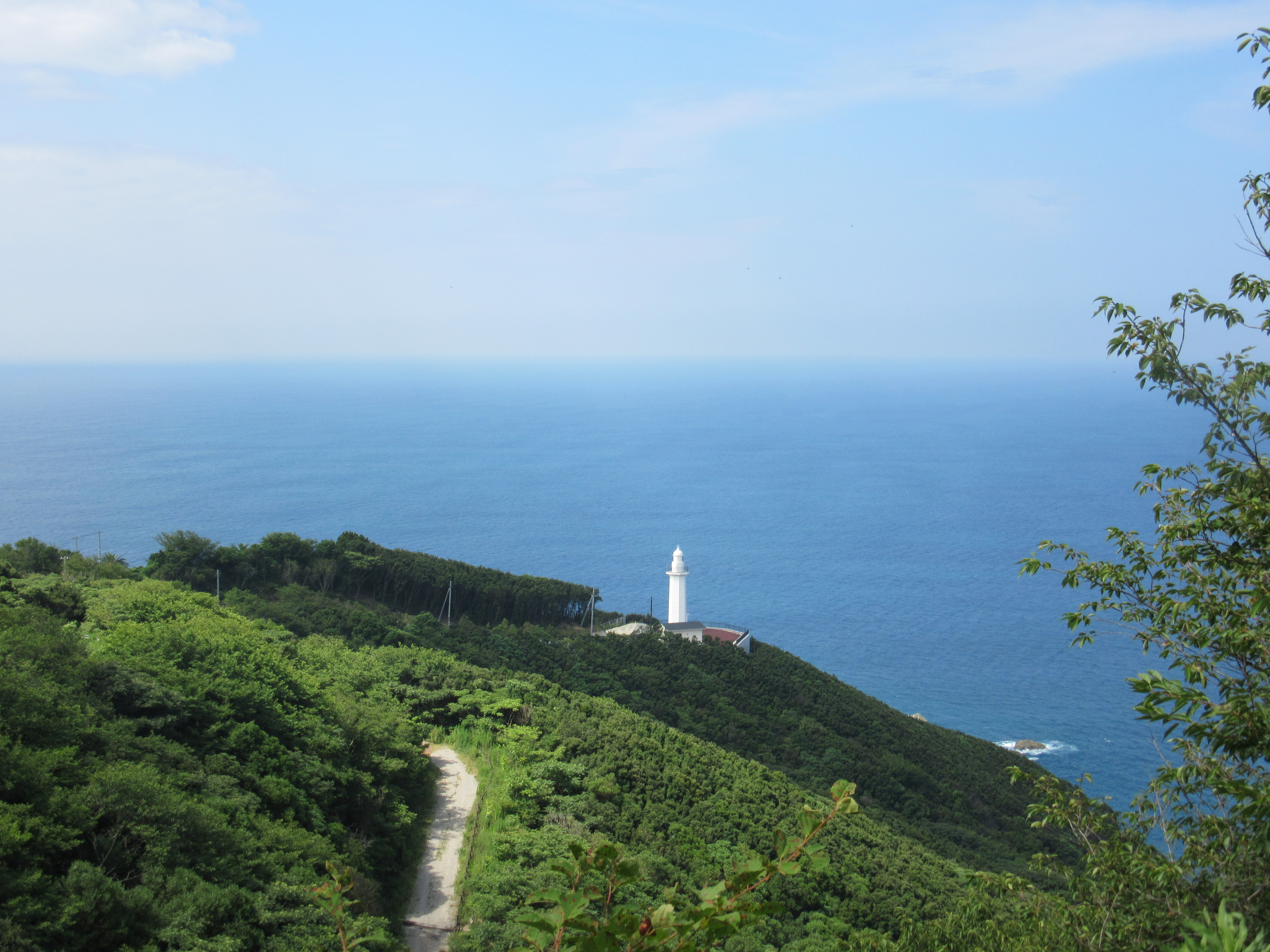
Cape Hinomisaki with Hinomisaki Lighthouse

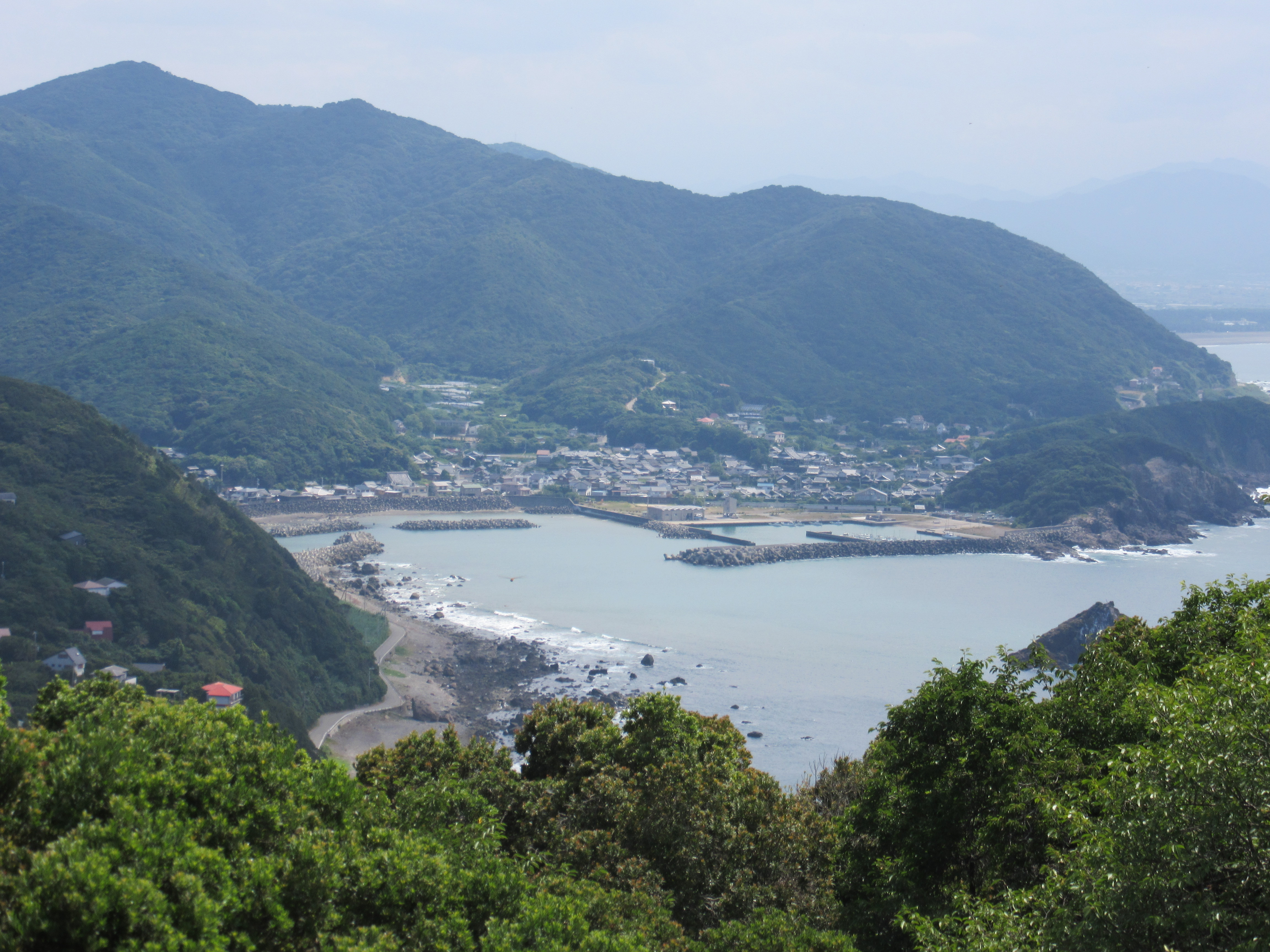
Mio neighborhood of Mihama

Mihama (美浜町, Mihama-chō) is a town located in Hidaka District, Wakayama Prefecture, Japan. As of 30 November 2021, the town had an estimated population of 6,761 in 3083 households and a population density of 530 persons per km^{2}. The total area of the town is 12.77 square kilometres (4.93 sq mi).

== Geography ==
Mihama is located on the coast in central Wakayama Prefecture, facing the Kii Channel to the southwest. The eastern part of the town is part of the Hidaka Plain and is the center of the city. The western part is designated as Enjukaigan Prefectural Natural Park. The highest point is Mount Nishiyama, with an elevation of 329 meters.

=== Neighboring municipalities ===
Wakayama Prefecture

- Gobō
- Hidaka

== Climate ==
Mihama has a humid subtropical climate (Köppen Cfa) characterized by warm summers and cool winters with light to no snowfall. The average annual temperature in Mihama is 16.8 °C. The average annual rainfall is 1878 mm with September as the wettest month. The temperatures are highest on average in August, at around 26.7 °C, and lowest in January, at around 7.3 °C. The area is subject to typhoons in summer.

== Demographics ==
Per Japanese census data, the population of Mihama has remained fairly steady over the past 70 years.

Historical population
Year	Pop.	±%
1920	5,799	—
1930	6,863	+18.3%
1940	6,960	+1.4%
1950	8,667	+24.5%
1960	8,550	−1.3%
1970	8,741	+2.2%
1980	8,832	+1.0%
1990	8,920	+1.0%
2000	8,802	−1.3%
2010	8,077	−8.2%
2020	6,867	−15.0%

== History ==
The area of the modern town of Inami was within ancient Kii Province. The villages of Matsubara, Mio and Wada were established with the creation of the modern municipalities system on April 1, 1889. These three villages merged on October 1, 1954, to form the town of Mihama.

== Government ==
Mihama has a mayor-council form of government with a directly elected mayor and a unicameral city council of 10 members. Inami collectively with the other municipalities of Hidaka District, contributes three members to the Wakayama Prefectural Assembly. In terms of national politics, the town is part of Wakayama 3rd district of the lower house of the Diet of Japan.

== Economy ==
The economy of Mihama is centered on commercial fishing and agriculture. The main catch is (Shirasu, spiny lobster, and abalone). The main crops are rice and cucumbers.

== Education ==
Mihama has two public elementary schools and one public middle schools operated by the town government. The town does not have a high school.

== Transportation ==
=== Railway ===
Mihama has no passenger rail service. The nearest train station is Gobō Station on the JR West Kisei Main Line in the neighboring city of Gobō

=== Highways ===
Mihama is not on any national highway or expressway.

== Local attractions ==
- Hinomisaki Lighthouse
