= Yura, Wakayama =

Yura 由良町
- Town
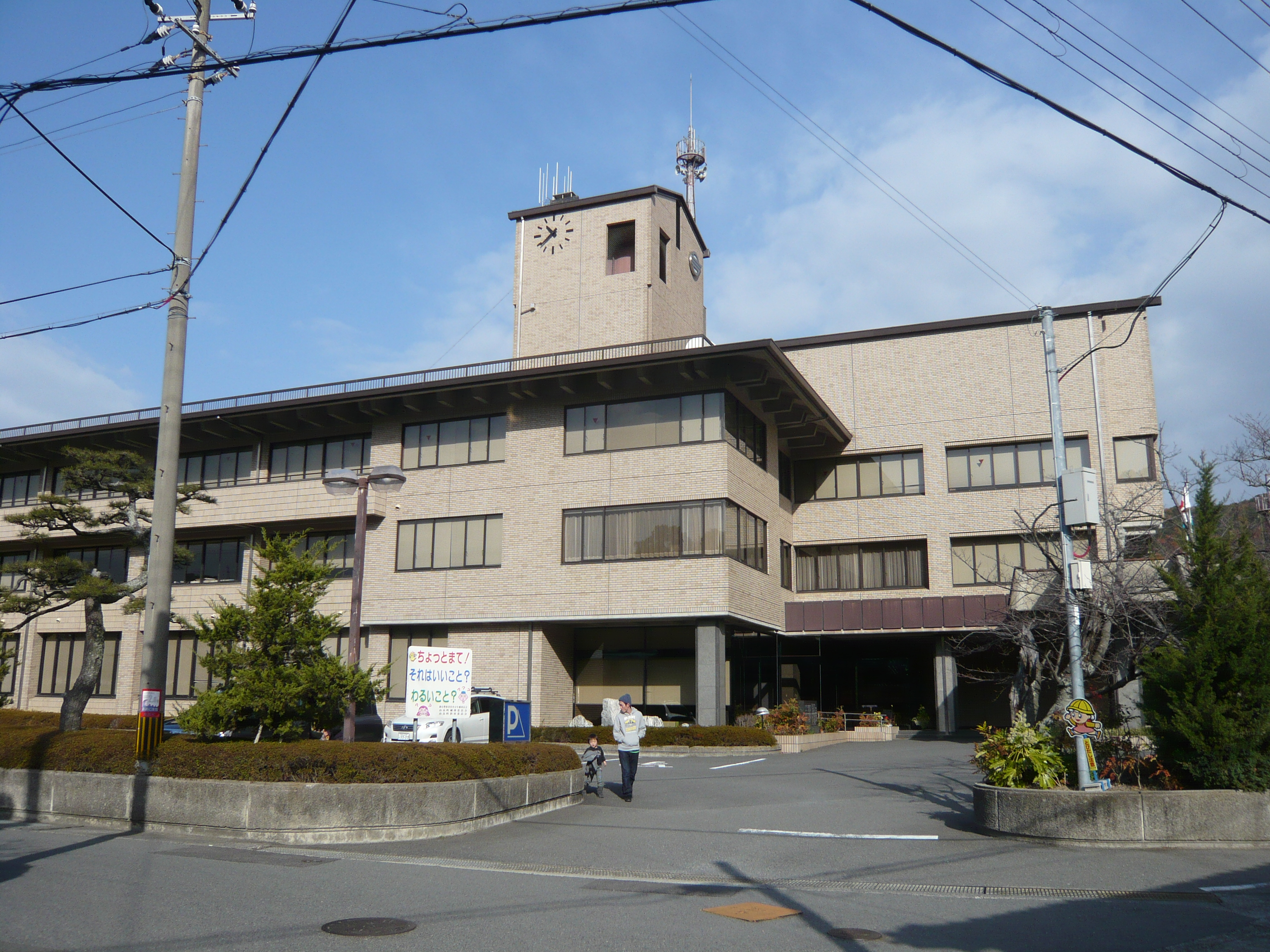
- Yura Town Hall

- Flag Seal

- Location of Yura in Wakayama Prefecture

- Location in Japan
- Coordinates: 33°58′N 135°7′E
- Country: Japan
- Region: Kansai
- Prefecture: Wakayama
- District: Hidaka

Area
  - Total: 30.94 km^{2} (11.95 sq mi)

Population (November 30, 2021)
  - Total: 5,442
  - Density: 175.9/km^{2} (455.5/sq mi)
- Time zone: UTC+09:00 (JST)
- City hall address: 1220-Oazari, Yura-cho, Hidaka-gun, Wakayama-ken 649-1111
- Website: Official website
- Symbols
- Flower: Narcissus
- Tree: Juniperus chinensis

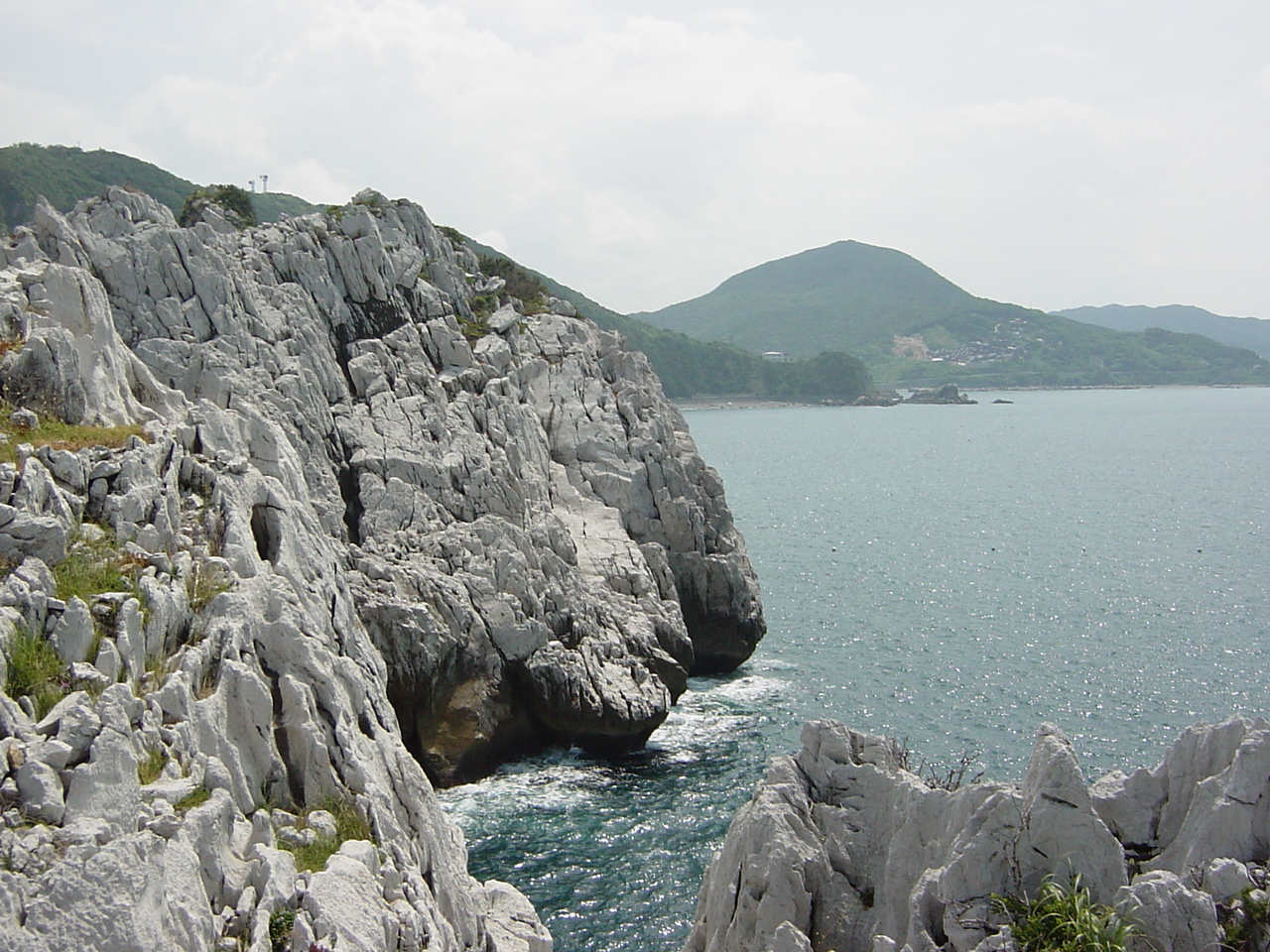
Shirasaki coast

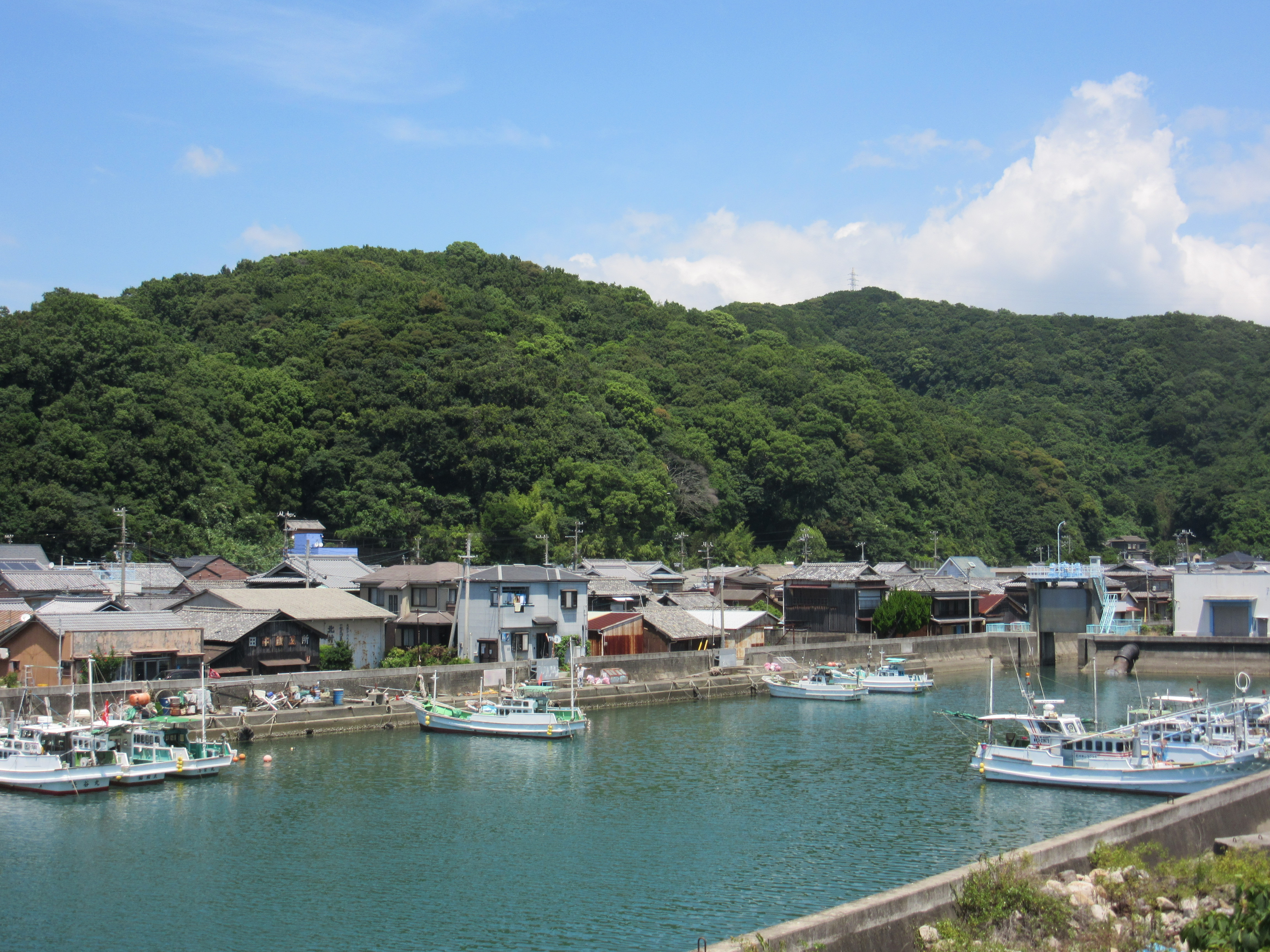
Yura port and old town

Yura (由良町, Yura-chō) is a town located in Hidaka District, Wakayama Prefecture, Japan. As of 30 November 2021, the town had an estimated population of 5,442 in 2678 households and a population density of 180 persons per km². The total area of the town is 30.94 square kilometres (11.95 sq mi).

== Geography ==
Yura is located on the coast in central Wakayama Prefecture, facing the Kii Channel to the north and west. The western part of the town contains the Shirasaki Prefectural Park, with a landscape made of limestone formations.

=== Neighboring municipalities ===
Wakayama Prefecture

- Hidaka
- Hirogawa

== Climate ==
Yura has a humid subtropical climate (Köppen Cfa) characterized by warm summers and cool winters with light to no snowfall. The average annual temperature in Yura is 16.8 °C. The average annual rainfall is 1839 mm with September as the wettest month. The temperatures are highest on average in August, at around 26.7 °C, and lowest in January, at around 7.3 °C. The area is subject to typhoons in summer.

== Demographics ==
Per Japanese census data, the population of Yura has been declining rapidly over the past 40 years.

Historical population
Year	Pop.	±%
1920	7,809	—
1930	9,289	+19.0%
1940	10,070	+8.4%
1950	11,070	+9.9%
1960	9,521	−14.0%
1970	8,258	−13.3%
1980	9,468	+14.7%
1990	8,529	−9.9%
2000	7,625	−10.6%
2010	6,505	−14.7%

== History ==
The area of the modern town of Yura was within ancient Kii Province, and its landscape is mentioned in several verses in the Nara period Man'yōshū. Yura claims to be the location where soy sauce was first produced in Japan. The village of Yura established with the creation of the modern municipalities system on April 1, 1889 and was raised to town status on October 15, 1947. Yura annexed the neighboring villages of Shirasaki and Ena on January 1, 1955.

== Government ==
Yura has a mayor-council form of government with a directly elected mayor and a unicameral city council of 10 members. Yura collectively with the other municipalities of Hidaka District, contributes three members to the Wakayama Prefectural Assembly. In terms of national politics, the town is part of Wakayama 3rd district of the lower house of the Diet of Japan.

== Economy ==
The economy of Yura is centered on tourism. The industry is the MES-KHI Yura Dock Co., Ltd., a joint venture between Mitsui E & S Holdings and Kawasaki Heavy Industries, which repairs ships.

== Education ==
Yura has three public elementary schools and one public middle schools operated by the town government. The town does not have a high school.

== Transportation ==
=== Railway ===
JR West – Kisei Main Line

- Kii-Yura

=== Highways ===
- National Route 42

== Local attractions ==
- Kokoku-ji
- Shirasaki Kaigan Park
