= Inami, Wakayama =

Inami 印南町
- Town
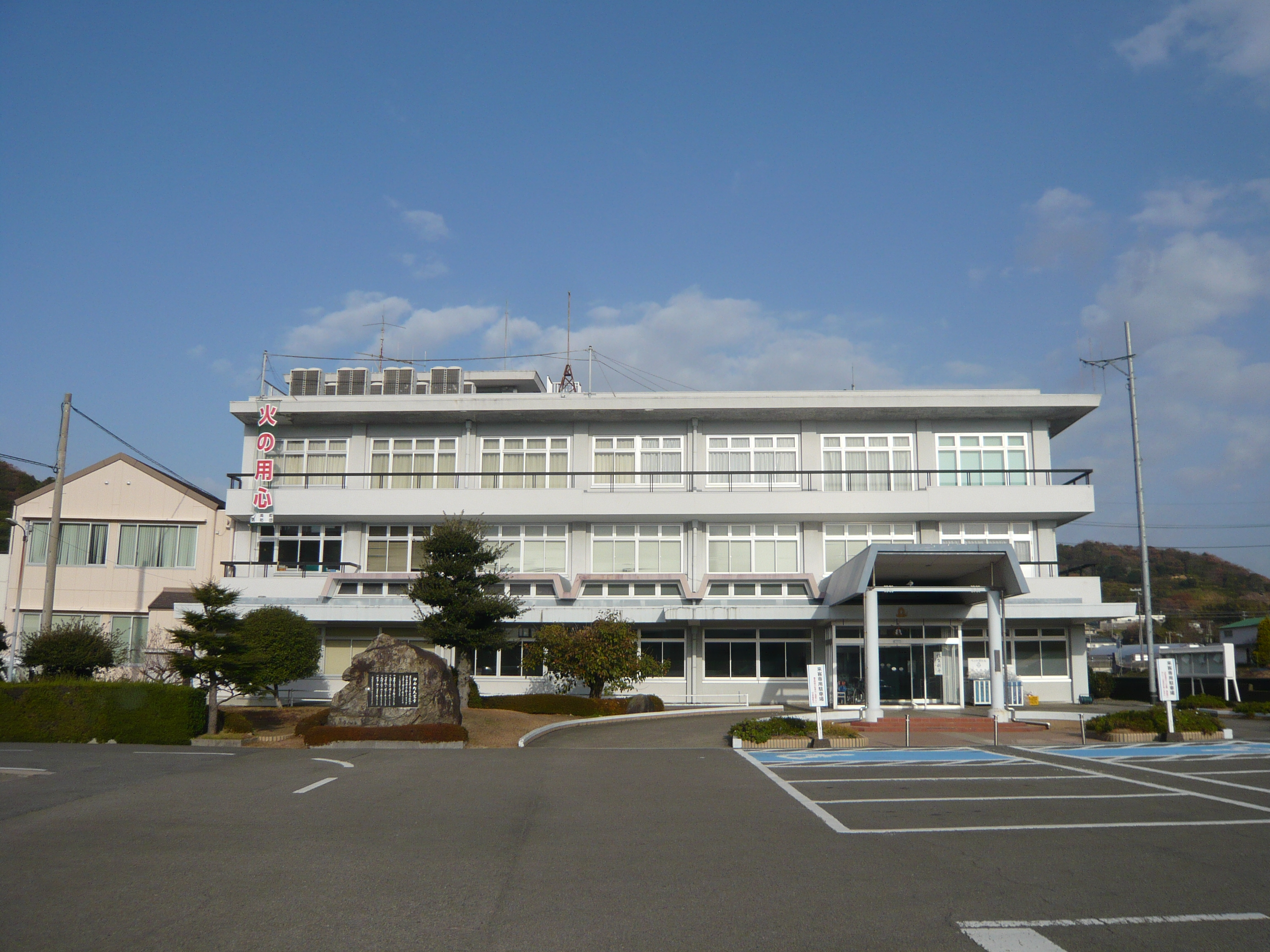
- Inami townhall

- Flag Emblem

- Location of Inami in Wakayama Prefecture

- Location in Japan
- Coordinates: 33°49′N 135°13′E
- Country: Japan
- Region: Kansai
- Prefecture: Wakayama
- District: Hidaka

Area
  - Total: 113.62 km^{2} (43.87 sq mi)

Population (November 30, 2021)
  - Total: 8,026
  - Density: 70.64/km^{2} (183.0/sq mi)
- Time zone: UTC+09:00 (JST)
- City hall address: 2252-1, Inami, Inami-cho, Hidaka-gun, Wakayama-ken 649-1534
- Website: Official website
- Symbols
- Fish: isaki
- Flower: Sarcandra glabra
- Tree: Cryptomeria,

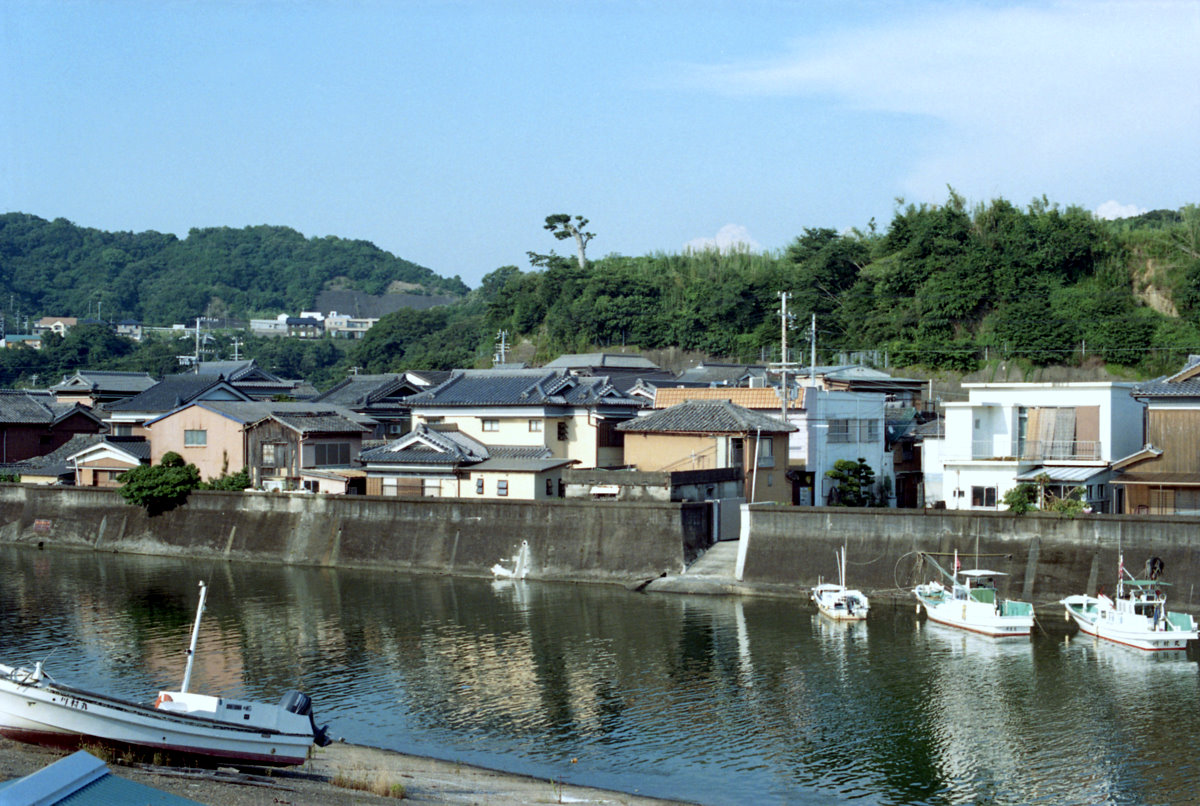
Inami port and old town

Inami (印南町, Inami-chō) is a town located in Hidaka District, Wakayama Prefecture, Japan. As of 30 November 2021, the town had an estimated population of 8,026 in 3333 households and a population density of 71 persons per km^{2}. The total area of the town is 113.62 square kilometres (43.87 sq mi).

== Geography ==
Inami is located in central Wakayama Prefecture, bordered by the Kii Channel to the southwest. The area is mostly forest at the western end of the Kii Mountains. The coastal areas are warm due to the influence of the Kuroshio Current, and are cultivated. The mountain area has a high elevation and snowfall can be seen in winter. The Kirime River, Innami River, and Oji River flow through the town.

=== Neighboring municipalities ===
Wakayama Prefecture

- Gobō
- Hidakagawa
- Minabe
- Tanabe

== Climate ==
Inami has a humid subtropical climate (Köppen Cfa) characterized by warm summers and cool winters with light to no snowfall. The average annual temperature in Inami is 15.9 °C. The average annual rainfall is 2077 mm with September as the wettest month. The temperatures are highest on average in August, at around 26.1 °C, and lowest in January, at around 6.1 °C. The area is subject to typhoons in summer.

== Demographics ==
Per Japanese census data, the population of Inami has been decreasing rapidly over the past 40 years.

Historical population
Year	Pop.	±%
1960	12,655	—
1970	10,853	−14.2%
1980	10,767	−0.8%
1990	10,315	−4.2%
2000	9,769	−5.3%
2010	8,606	−11.9%
2020	7,720	−10.3%

== History ==
The area of the modern town of Inami was within ancient Kii Province, and was noted as a fishing port in the Edo period. The village of Inami was established with the creation of the modern municipalities system on April 1, 1889. It was elevated to town status on April 14, 1900. The neighboring village of Inahara was annexed on September 30, 1956, followed by the village of Kirimegawa and Azumi on August 1, 1957.

== Government ==
Inami has a mayor-council form of government with a directly elected mayor and a unicameral city council of 12 members. Inami collectively with the other municipalities of Hidaka District, contributes three members to the Wakayama Prefectural Assembly. In terms of national politics, the town is part of Wakayama 3rd district of the lower house of the Diet of Japan.

== Economy ==
The economy of Inami is centered on forestry and agriculture. The town is famous for its snow peas, umeboshi and watermelons.

== Education ==
Inami has four public elementary schools and four public middle schools operated by the town government. The town does not have a high school.

== Transportation ==
=== Railway ===
JR West – Kisei Main Line

- Kirime - Inami - Inahara

=== Highways ===
- Hanwa Expressway
- National Route 42
- National Route 425
