= Gobō Station =

Railway station in Gobō, Wakayama Prefecture, Japan

Gobō Station 御坊駅
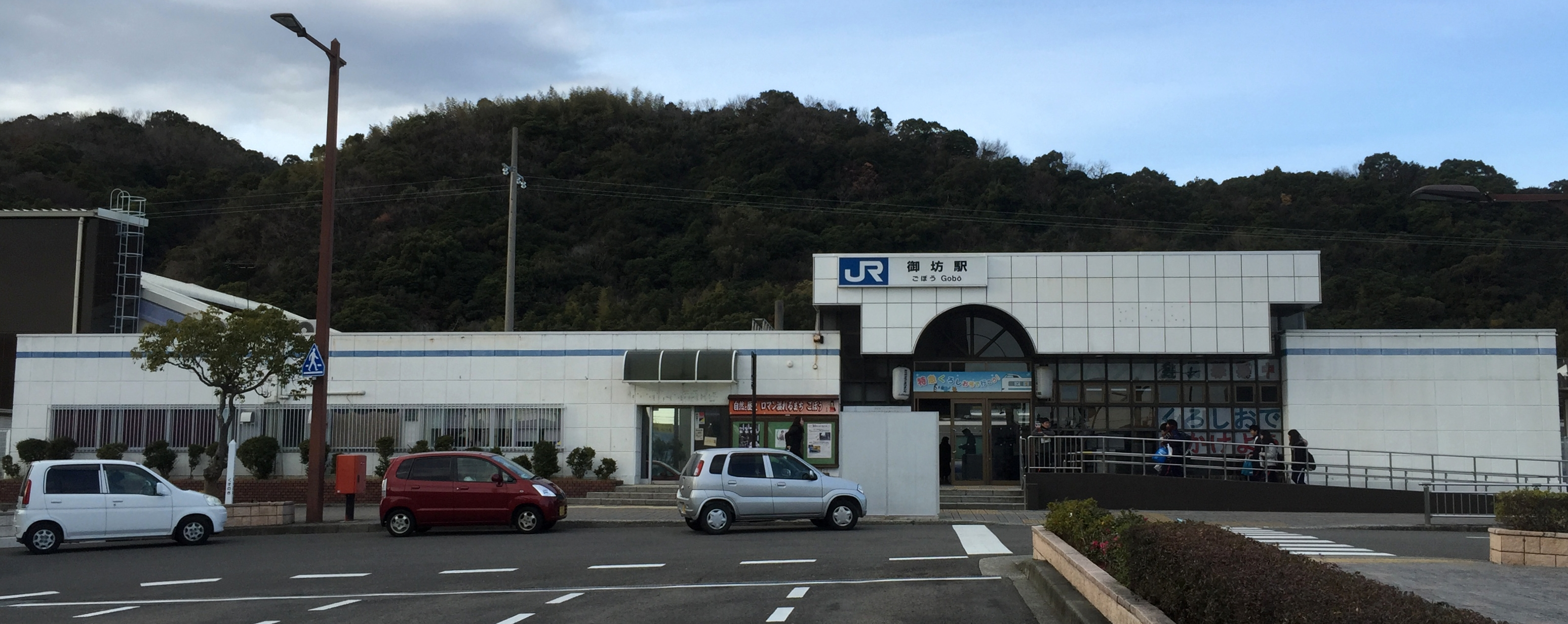
- Gobō Station in January 2016

General information
- Location: 414-2 Komatsubara Yukawachō, Gobō-shi, Wakayama-ken 644-0012; Japan
- Coordinates: 33.9077147°N 135.1591837°E
- Owner: West Japan Railway Company
- Operator: West Japan Railway Company; Kishū Railway
- Lines: W Kisei Main Line (Kinokuni Line); ■ Kishū Railway
- Distance: 326.3 km (202.8 miles) from Kameyama; 146.1 km (90.8 miles) from Shingū
- Platforms: 1 side+ 1 bay + 1 island platform
- Tracks: 3
- Train operators: W Kisei Main Line (Kinokuni Line); Kishū Railway

Construction
- Structure type: At grade

Other information
- Status: Staffed ( Midori no Madoguchi )
- Website: Official website

History
- Opened: 21 April 1929
- Electrified: 1978

Passengers
- FY2019: 1575 daily (JR); 141 daily (Kishū)
Location
- Location within Wakayama Prefecture Location within Japan

Gobō Station (御坊駅, Gobō-eki) is an interchange passenger railway station in located in the city of Gobō, Wakayama Prefecture, Japan, operated by West Japan Railway Company (JR West) and the private railway company Kishū Railway.

== Lines ==
Gobō Station is served by the Kisei Main Line (Kinokuni Line), and is located 326.3 kilometers from the terminus of the line at Kameyama Station and 146.1 kilometers from Shingū. It is also the terminus of the Kishū Railway Line and is 2.7 kilometers from the opposing terminus at Nishi-Gobō

== Station layout ==
The station consists of one side platform and one island platform serving three tracks. The side platform ahas a cutout to form a partial bay platform for the dead headed operations of the Kishū Railway Line. The station as a Midori no Madoguchi staffed ticket office.

=== Platforms ===
0	■ Kishu Railway Line	for Kii-Gobo and Nishi-Gobo
1	■ W Kisei Main Line	Wakayama, Tennōji, Shin-Ōsaka and Kyōto
2	■ W Kisei Main Line	for Wakayama (siding, returning) for Kii-Tanabe, Shirahama and Shingū (siding)
3	■ W Kisei Main Line	for Kii-Tanabe, Shirahama and Shingū (including trains starting this station)

== Adjacent stations ==
«	Service	»
West Japan Railway Company (JR West)
Kisei Main Line (Kinokuni Line)
Minabe or Kii-Tanabe	Limited Express Kuroshio	Yuasa
Dōjōji	Rapid	Kii-Yura
Dōjōji	Local	Kii-Uchihara
Kishū Railway
Kishū Railway Line
Terminus	Local	Gakumon

== History ==
Gobō Station opened on April 21, 1929. The Kishū Railway began operations on June 15, 1931. The current station building was completed in March 1984. With the privatization of the Japan National Railways (JNR) on April 1, 1987, the station came under the aegis of the West Japan Railway Company.

== Passenger statistics ==
In fiscal 2019, the JR portion of the station was used by an average of 1575 passengers daily and the Kishū Railway portion was used by 141 passengers daily (boarding passengers only).

== Surrounding Area ==
- Gobō Public Employment Security Office
- Wakayama Labor Bureau Gobō Labor Standards Inspection Office
- Wakayama District Court Gobō Branch
- Wakayama Family Court Gobō Branch

== See also ==
- List of railway stations in Japan
