= Arii Station =

Railway station in Kumano, Mie Prefecture, Japan

Arii Station 有井駅
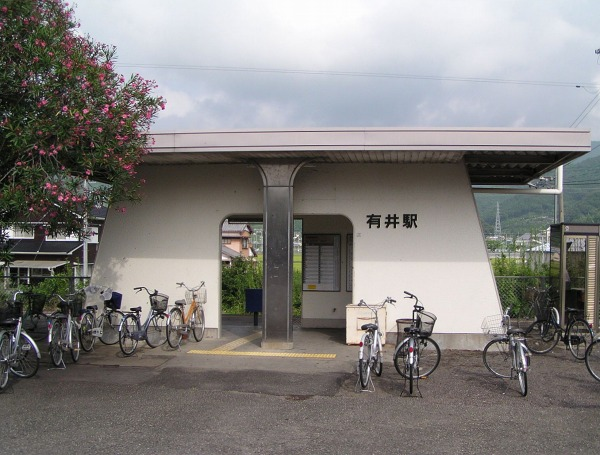
- Arii Station

General information
- Location: 1003 Arima, Kumano-shi, Mie-ken 519-4325; Japan
- Coordinates: 33.8757°N 136.0859°E
- Operator: JR Tōkai
- Line: ■ Kisei Main Line
- Distance: 159.6 km from Kameyama
- Platforms: 1 side platform
- Connections: Bus terminal

Construction
- Structure type: Ground level

Other information
- Status: Unstaffed

History
- Opened: August 8, 1940

Passengers
- FY2019: 52 daily

Services
Preceding station	JR Central	Following station
Koshiyama towards Shingū	Kisei Main Line Local	Kumanoshi towards Nagoya
Location
- Location within Mie Prefecture Location within Japan

Arii Station (有井駅, Arii-eki) is a passenger railway station in located in the city of Kumano, Mie Prefecture, Japan, operated by Central Japan Railway Company (JR Tōkai).

== Lines ==
Arii Station is served by the Kisei Main Line, and is located 159.6 km (99.2 mi) from the terminus of the line at Kameyama Station.

== Station layout ==
The station consists of a single side platform serving bi-directional traffic. The small wooden station building dates from the original construction of the line. The station is unattended.

=== Platforms ===
1	■ Kisei Main Line	For Shingū; For Owase, Nagoya

== History ==
Arii Station opened on 8 August 1940 as a station on the Japanese Government Railways (JGR) Kisei-Nishi Line. The JGR became the Japan National Railways (JNR) after World War II, and the line was renamed the Kisei Main Line on 15 July 1959. The station has been unattended since 21 December 1983. The station was absorbed into the JR Central network upon the privatization of the JNR on 1 April 1987.

== Passenger statistics ==
In fiscal 2019, the station was used by an average of 52 passengers daily (boarding passengers only).

== Surrounding area ==
- Kumano City Arima Elementary School
- Kumano City Arima Junior High School

== See also ==
- List of railway stations in Japan
