= Udono Station =

Railway station in Kihō, Mie Prefecture, Japan

Udono Station 鵜殿駅
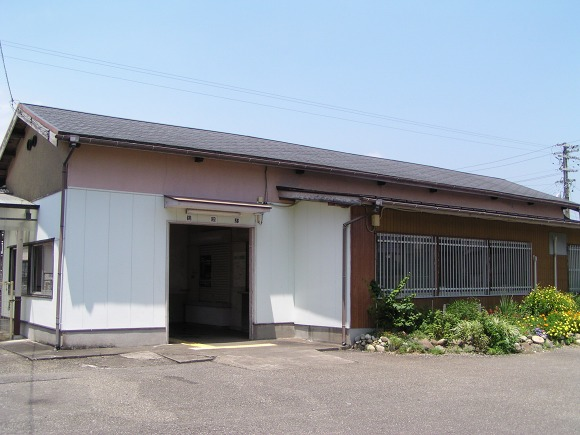
- Udono Station, August 2005

General information
- Location: 1551 Udono, Kihō-machi, Minamimuro-gun, Mie-ken 519-5701; Japan
- Coordinates: 33.7366°N 136.0157°E
- Operator: JR Tōkai
- Line: Kisei Main Line
- Distance: 176.6 km from Kameyama
- Platforms: 1 island platform
- Connections: Bus terminal

Other information
- Status: Unstaffed

History
- Opened: 8 August 1940

Passengers
- FY2019: 111 daily

Services
Preceding station	JR Central	Following station
Shingū Terminus	Kisei Main Line Local	Kii-Ida towards Nagoya
Location
- Location within Mie Prefecture Location within Japan

Udono Station (鵜殿駅, Udono-eki) is a passenger railway station in located in the town of Kihō, Minamimuro District, Mie, Japan, operated by Central Japan Railway Company (JR Tōkai).

== Lines ==
Udono Station is served by the Kisei Main Line, and is located 176.6 km (109.7 mi) from the terminus of the line at Kameyama Station.

== Station layout ==
The station consists of a single island platform connected to the station building by a level crossing. The station is unattended.

The station was also connected by a three-kilometer private line which runs from the freight yard next to the station to the Hokuetsu Kishu Paper Co. factory nearby. The line was abolished in 2016 when the freight services were discontinued.

=== Platforms ===
1	■ Kisei Main Line	for Shingū
2	■ Kisei Main Line	for Owase and Nagoya

== History ==
Udono Station opened as a station on the Kisei West Line on 8 August 1940. The passenger station was absorbed into the JR Central network upon the privatization of JNR on 1 April 1987, with the sidings and freight depot portion of the station falling under the aegis of the Japan Freight Railway Company. The freight depot was abolished in 2016.

== Passenger statistics ==
In fiscal 2019, the station was used by an average of 111 passengers daily (boarding passengers only).

== Surrounding area ==
- Kiho Town Hall (former Udono Village Hall)
- Kiho Town Udono Elementary School
- Hokuetsu Paper Mills Kishu Factory
- Udono Port

== See also ==
- List of railway stations in Japan
