= Udono, Mie =

Udono 鵜殿村
- Former municipality
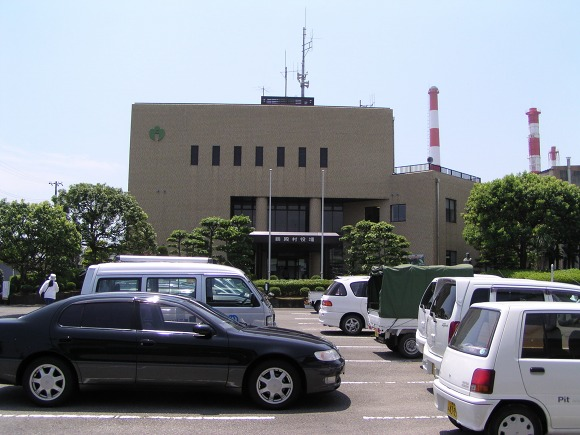
- former Udono village hall

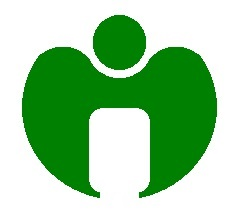
- Flag Seal

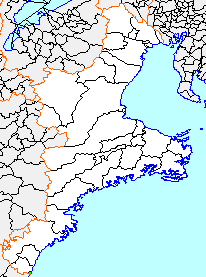
- Location of Udono in Mie Prefecture

- Location in Japan
- Coordinates: 33°43′7″N 136°1′1″E
- Country: Japan
- Region: Kansai (Kinki region)
- Prefecture: Mie Prefecture
- District: Minamimuro
- Merged: January 10, 2008 (now part of Kihō)

Area
  - Total: 2.88 km^{2} (1.11 sq mi)

Population (2004)
  - Total: 4,852
  - Density: 1,684.7/km^{2} (4,363/sq mi)
- Time zone: UTC+09:00 (JST)
- Symbols
- Flower: Narcissus
- Tree: Cinnamomum camphora

Udono (鵜殿村, Udono-mura) was a village located in Minamimuro District, Mie Prefecture, Japan.

As of 2004 (the last official figures before its dissolution), the village had an estimated population of 4,852 and a population density of 1684.7 persons per km^{2}. The total area was 2.88 km^{2}.

On January 10, 2006, Udono was merged into the expanded town of Kihō and thus no longer exists as an independent municipality. As a result, this merger, all villages in Mie Prefecture have ceased to exist.

The village of Udono was founded on February 13, 1894, with the early Meiji period establishment of municipalities. The basis of the village's economy was a paper mill operated by Hokuetsu Paper Mills.
