= Kii-Ida Station =

Railway station in Kihō, Mie Prefecture, Japan

Kii-Ida Station 紀伊井田駅
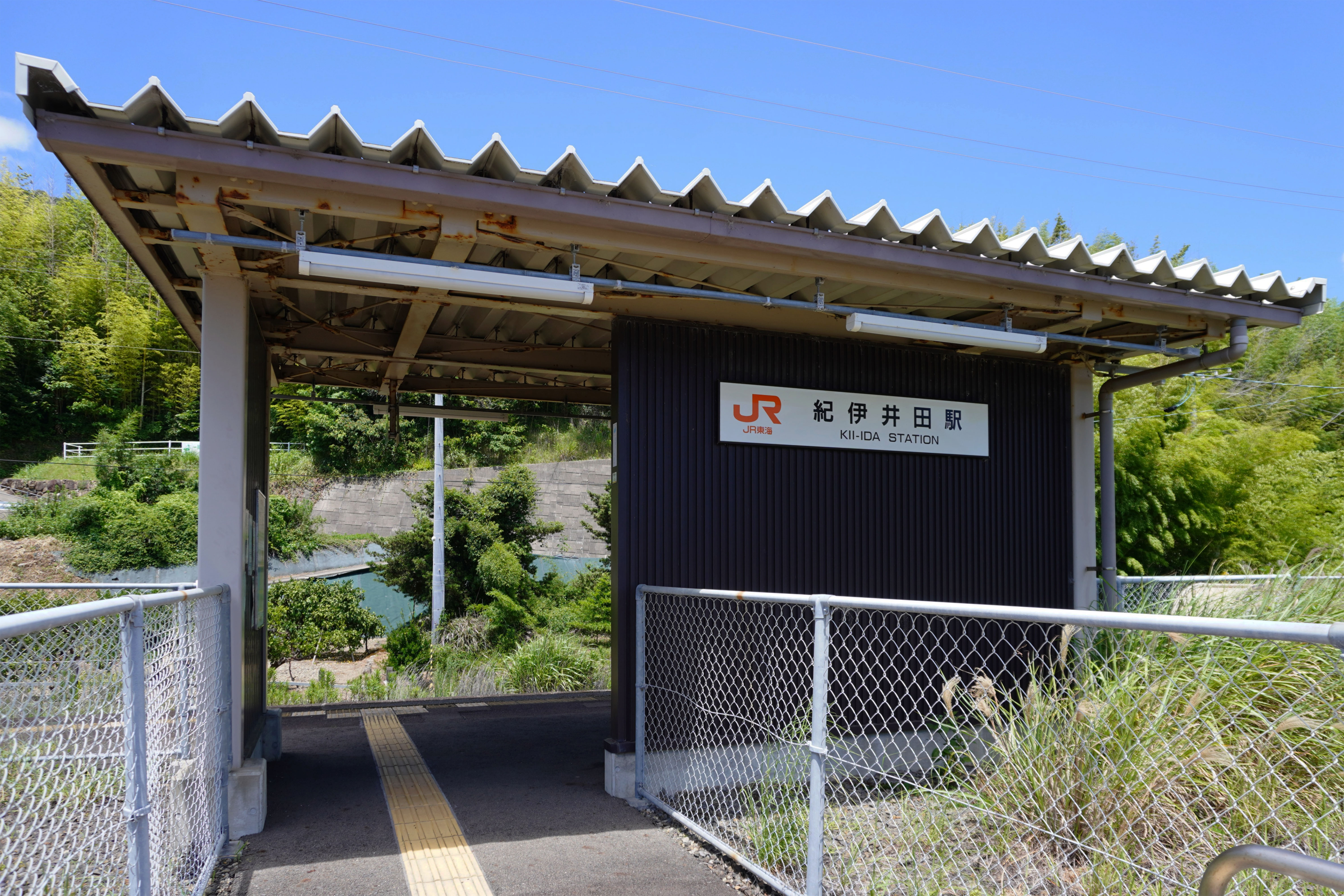
- Kii-Ida Station at July 2023

General information
- Location: 1444 Ida, Kihō-machi, Minamimuro-gun, Mie-ken 519-5711; Japan
- Coordinates: 33.7596°N 136.0239°E
- Operator: JR Tōkai
- Line: Kisei Main Line
- Distance: 173.8 km from Kameyama
- Platforms: 1 side platform
- Tracks: 1
- Connections: Bus terminal

Construction
- Structure type: At-grade

Other information
- Status: Unstaffed

History
- Opened: 8 August 1940

Passengers
- FY2019: 34 daily

Services
Preceding station	JR Central	Following station
Udono towards Shingū	Kisei Main Line Local	Atawa towards Nagoya
Location
- Location within Mie Prefecture Location within Japan

Kii-Ida Station (紀伊井田駅, Kii-Ida-eki) is a passenger railway station in located in the town of Kihō, Minamimuro District, Mie, Japan, operated by Central Japan Railway Company (JR Tōkai).

== Lines ==
Kii-Ida Station is served by the Kisei Main Line, and is located 173.8 km (108.0 mi) from the terminus of the line at Kameyama Station.

== Station layout ==
The station consists of one side platform serving bi-directional traffic. The original station building, dating from the opening of the line, was demolished and replaced by a smaller, simpler waiting-room structure in 2012. The station is unattended.

=== Platforms ===
1	■ Kisei Main Line	For Shingū; For Owase, Nagoya

== History ==
Kii-Ida Station opened on 8 August 1940, as a station on the Japanese Government Railways (JGR) Kisei-Nishi Line. The JGR became the Japan National Railways (JNR) after World War II, and the line was renamed the Kisei Main Line on 15 July 1959. The station has been unattended since 21 December 1983. The station was absorbed into the JR Central network upon the privatization of the JNR on 1 April 1987.

== Passenger statistics ==
In fiscal 2019, the station was used by an average of 34 passengers daily (boarding passengers only).

== Surrounding area ==
- Kiho Town Ida Elementary School
- Kiho Town Hall Ida Branch
- Ida Kannon

== See also ==
- List of railway stations in Japan
