= Atawa Station =

Railway station in Mihama, Mie Prefecture, Japan

Atawa Station 阿田和駅
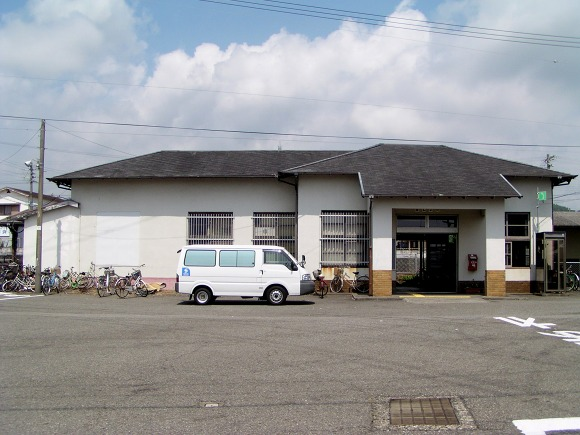
- Atawa Station

General information
- Location: 5114 Atawa, Mihama-machi, Minamimuro-gun, Mie-ken 519-5204; Japan
- Coordinates: 33.8049°N 136.0427°E
- Operator: JR Tōkai
- Line: Kisei Main Line
- Distance: 168.4 km from Kameyama
- Platforms: 1 island platform
- Tracks: 2
- Connections: Bus terminal

Construction
- Structure type: Ground level

Other information
- Status: Unstaffed

History
- Opened: 8 August 1940

Passengers
- FY2019: 148 daily

Services
Preceding station	JR Central	Following station
Kii-Ida towards Shingū	Kisei Main Line Local	Kii-Ichigi towards Nagoya
Location
- Location within Mie Prefecture Location within Japan

Atawa Station (阿田和駅, Atawa-eki) is a passenger railway station in located in the town of Mihama, Minamimuro District, Mie, Japan, operated by Central Japan Railway Company (JR Tōkai).

== Lines ==
Atawa Station is served by the Kisei Main Line, and is located 168.4 km (104.6 mi) from the terminus of the line at Kameyama Station.

== Station layout ==
Atawa Station consists of one island platform connected to the station building by a level crossing. The small station building dates from the original construction of the line. The station is unattended.

=== Platforms ===
1	■ Kisei Main Line	for Shingū
2	■ Kisei Main Line	for Owase, and Nagoya

== History ==
Atawa Station opened on 8 August 1940, as a station on the Japanese Government Railways (JGR) Kisei-Nishi Line. The JGR became the Japan National Railways (JNR) after World War II, and the line was renamed the Kisei Main Line on 15 July 1959. The station has been unattended since 21 December 1983. The station was absorbed into the JR Central network upon the privatization of the JNR on 1 April 1987.

== Passenger statistics ==
In fiscal 2019, the station was used by an average of 148 passengers daily (boarding passengers only).

== Surrounding area ==
- Mihama Town Office
- Hikitsukuri Shrine
- Mihama Municipal Atawa Elementary School
- Mihama Municipal Atawa Junior High School

== See also ==
- List of railway stations in Japan
