= Mihama, Mie =

Mihama 御浜町
- Town
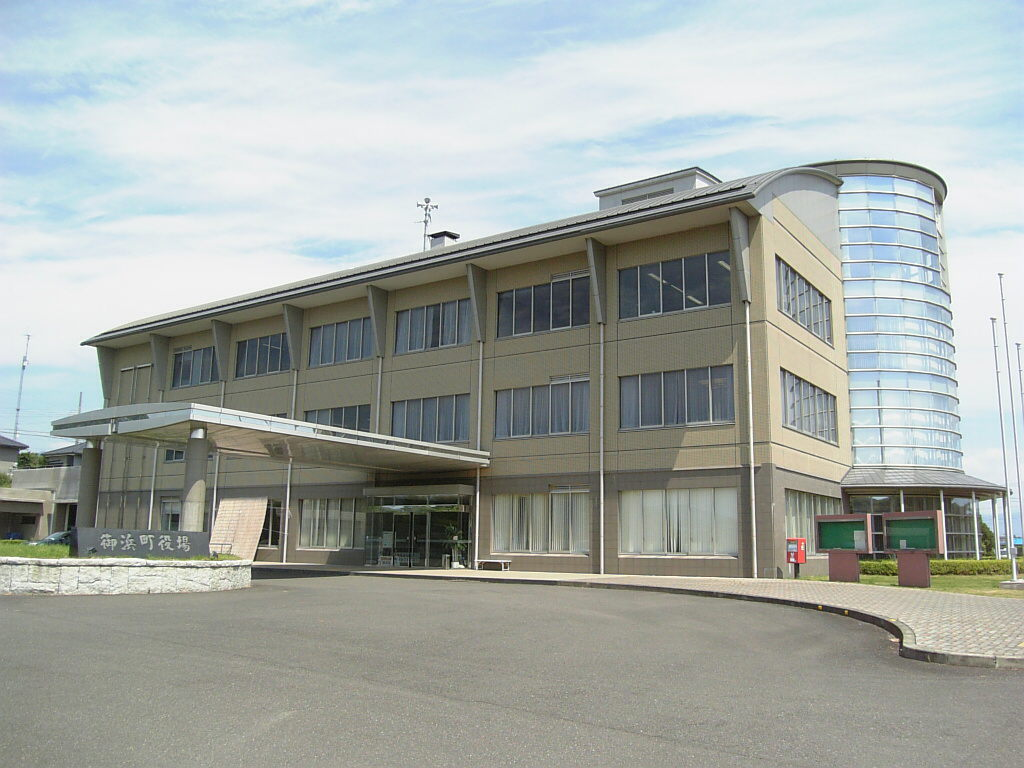
- Mihama Town Office

- Flag Seal
- Interactive map of Mihama
- Coordinates: 33°49′N 136°3′E
- Country: Japan
- Region: Kansai
- Prefecture: Mie
- District: Minamimuro

Area
  - Total: 88.28 km^{2} (34.09 sq mi)

Population (April 2021)
  - Total: 8,256
  - Density: 93.52/km^{2} (242.2/sq mi)
- Time zone: UTC+9 (Japan Standard Time)
- City symbols
  - Tree: Pinus thunbergii
  - Flower: Citrus unshiu
  - Bird: Meadow bunting
- Phone number: 05979－3－0505
- Address: 6120-1 Atawa, Mihama-chō, Minamimuro-gun, Mie-ken 519-5204
- Website: Official website

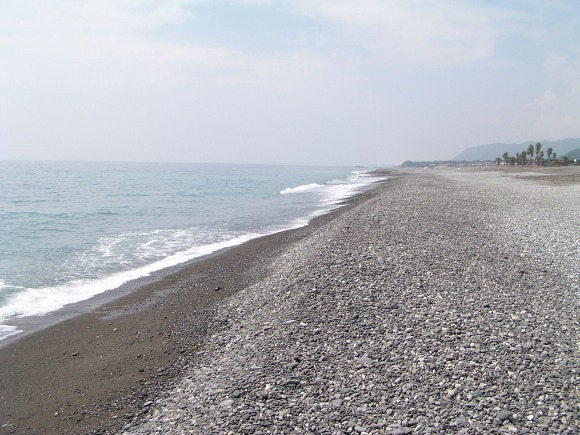
Shichirimihama Beach

Mihama (御浜町, Mihama-chō) is a town located in Mie Prefecture, Japan. As of 1 April 2021, the town had an estimated population of 8,256 in 4,155 households and a population density of 94 persons per km^{2}. The total area of the town is 88.28 square kilometres (34.09 sq mi).

== Geography ==
Mihama is located near the southern tip of the Kii Peninsula, facing the Pacific Ocean, in southern Mie Prefecture. Parts of the town are within the borders of the Yoshino-Kumano National Park.

== Climate ==
Mihama has a humid subtropical climate (Köppen Cfa) characterized by warm summers and cool winters with light to no snowfall. The average annual temperature in Mihama is 15.7 °C. The average annual rainfall is 2596 mm with September as the wettest month. The temperatures are highest on average in August, at around 25.6 °C, and lowest in January, at around 5.8 °C.

Climate data for Mihama（1985 - 2010）
| Month | Jan | Feb | Mar | Apr | May | Jun | Jul | Aug | Sep | Oct | Nov | Dec | Year |
|---|---|---|---|---|---|---|---|---|---|---|---|---|---|
| Average precipitation mm (inches) | 103.3 (4.07) | 114.4 (4.50) | 214.0 (8.43) | 232.2 (9.14) | 327.0 (12.87) | 382.5 (15.06) | 353.2 (13.91) | 343.8 (13.54) | 525.3 (20.68) | 295.8 (11.65) | 178.5 (7.03) | 92.9 (3.66) | 3,162.9 (124.54) |
Source: Japan Meteorological Agency

== Demographics ==
The population of Mihama has remained relatively steady over the past 40 years.

Historical population
| Year | Pop. | ±% |
|---|---|---|
| 1960 | 12,965 | — |
| 1970 | 11,081 | −14.5% |
| 1980 | 10,544 | −4.8% |
| 1990 | 9,893 | −6.2% |
| 2000 | 10,033 | +1.4% |
| 2010 | 9,380 | −6.5% |

== History ==
The area of Mihama was part of the holdings of the Kii Tokugawa clan, administered as part of the Kii-Shingū Domain in the Edo period. After the Meiji restoration, the village of Atawa was established within Minamimuro District with the early Meiji period creation of the modern municipalities system on April 1, 1889. It was elevated to town status on October 1, 1933. Atawa Town was merged with two neighboring villages of Ichigioroshi and Kōshiyama to form the town of Mihama on September 1, 1958.

In 2009 the ferry Ariake (ferry) was shipwrecked in Mihama. There were some injuries but all 28 passengers and crew were rescued.

== Government ==
Mihama has a mayor-council form of government with a directly elected mayor and a unicameral town council of 10 members. Mihama, collectively with the city of Kumano and town of Kihō, contributes two members to the Mie Prefectural Assembly. In terms of national politics, the town is part of Mie 4th district of the lower house of the Diet of Japan.

== Economy ==
Mihama serves as a commercial center for the surrounding region. The area is noted for horticulture, and Mihama is known as "The town where you can pick mikan (mandarin oranges) all year long" (Nenju mikan no toreru machi). This phrase is even written on the manhole covers, accompanied by a picture of a smiling orange.

== Education ==
Mihama has four public elementary schools and three public middle schools operated by the city government, and one public high school operated by the Mie Prefectural Board of Education.

== Transportation ==
=== Railway ===
JR Tōkai – Kisei Main Line

- Kōshiyama - Kii-Ichigi - Atawa

=== Highway ===
- National Route 42
- National Route 311

== Notable people from Mihama ==
- Keiichi Yabu – professional baseball player
