= Kii-Ichigi Station =

Railway station in Mihama, Mie Prefecture, Japan

Kii-Ichigi Station 紀伊市木駅
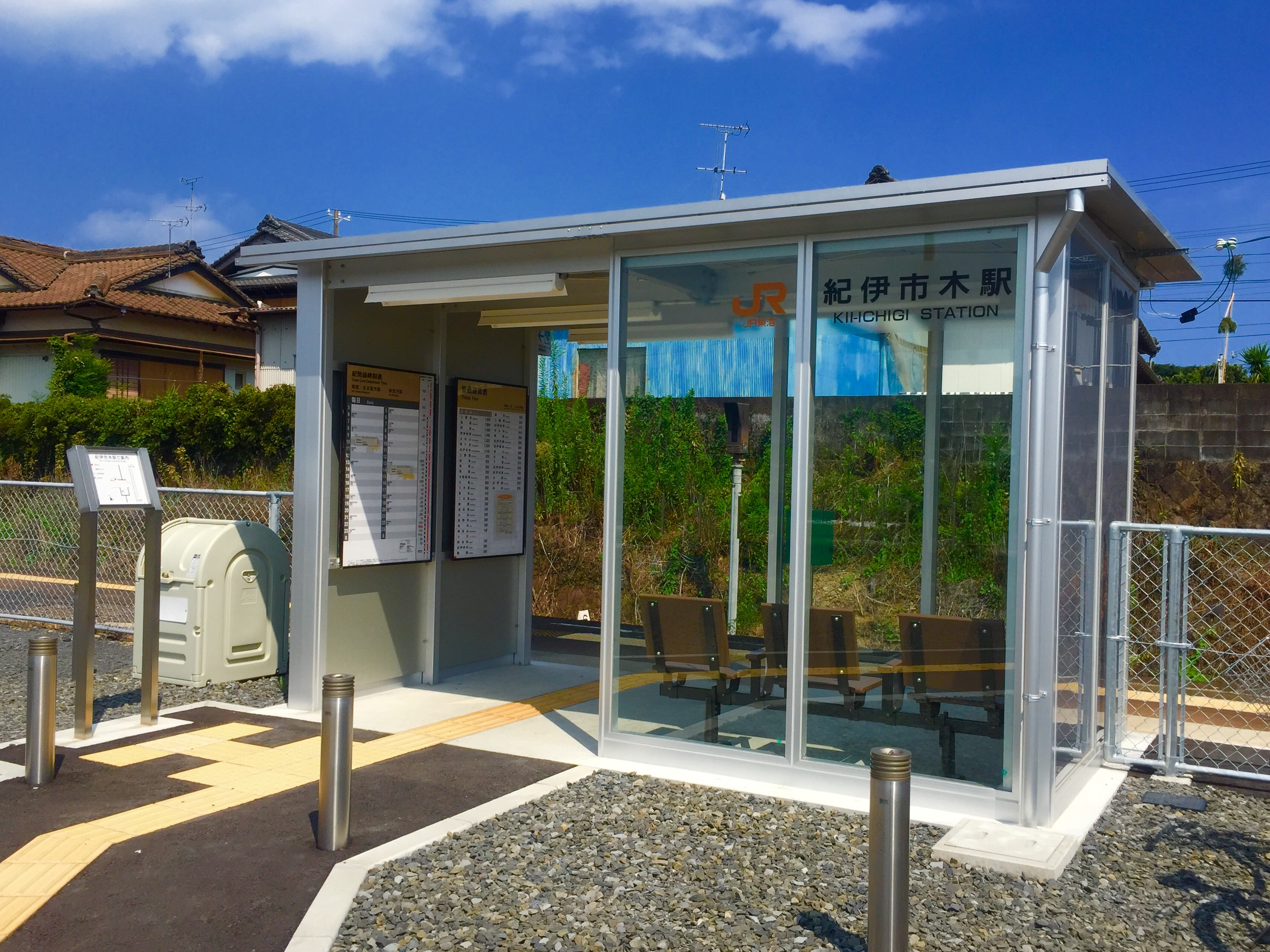
- Kii-Ichigi Station

General information
- Location: 4489 Ichigi, Mihama-machi, Minamimuro-gun, Mie-ken 519-5203; Japan
- Coordinates: 33.8278°N 136.0556°E
- Operator: JR Tōkai
- Line: Kisei Main Line
- Distance: 165.6 km from Kameyama
- Platforms: 1 side platform
- Tracks: 1
- Connections: Bus terminal

Other information
- Status: Unstaffed

History
- Opened: August 8, 1940

Passengers
- FY2019: 43 daily

Services
Preceding station	JR Central	Following station
Atawa towards Shingū	Kisei Main Line Local	Koshiyama towards Nagoya
Location
- Location within Mie Prefecture Location within Japan

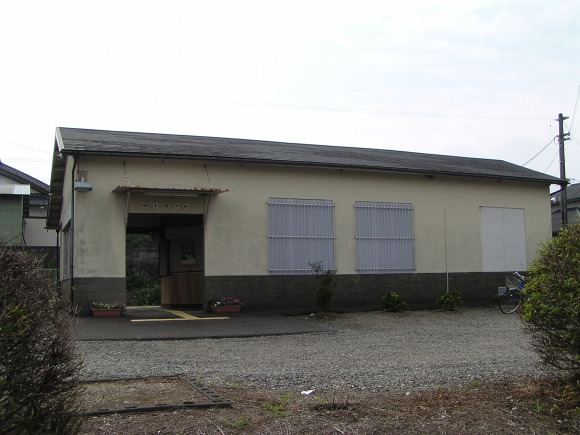
The former station building

Kii-Ichigi Station (紀伊市木駅, Kii-Ichigi-eki) is a passenger railway station in located in the town of Kihō, Minamimuro District, Mie, Japan, operated by Central Japan Railway Company (JR Tōkai).

== Lines ==
Kii-Ichigi Station is served by the Kisei Main Line, and is located 165.6 km (102.9 mi) from the terminus of the line at Kameyama Station.

== Station layout ==
The station consists of a single side platform serving bidirectional traffic. The original station building, dating from the opening of the line, was demolished and replaced by a smaller, simpler waiting-room structure in 2015–16. The station is unattended.

=== Platforms ===
1	■ Kisei Main Line	For Shingū; For Owase, Nagoya

== History ==
Kii-Ichigi Station opened on 8 August 1940 as a station on the Japanese Government Railways (JGR) Kisei-Nishi Line. The JGR became the Japan National Railways (JNR) after World War II, and the line was renamed the Kisei Main Line on 15 July 1959. The station has been unattended since 21 December 1983. The station was absorbed into the JR Central network upon the privatization of the JNR on 1 April 1987.

== Passenger statistics ==
In fiscal 2019, the station was used by an average of 43 passengers daily (boarding passengers only).

== Surrounding area ==
- Mihama Municipal Mihama Elementary School

== See also ==
- List of railway stations in Japan
