= Ariake =

Ariake (有明: "daybreak") may refer to:

== Places in Japan ==
- Ariake, Kagoshima, a former town in Kagoshima Prefecture
- Ariake, Kumamoto, a former town in Kumamoto Prefecture
- Ariake, Saga, a former town in Saga Prefecture
- Ariake, Tokyo, a district within Kōtō, Tokyo
- Ariake Sea, a body of water surrounded by Fukuoka, Saga, Nagasaki, and Kumamoto Prefectures

== People with the surname ==
- Kambara Ariake (1876–1952), Japanese poet and novelist

== Other ==
- Ariake (train), a train service of Kyushu Railway Company
- Japanese destroyer Ariake, four destroyers of the Imperial Japanese Navy and the Japanese Maritime Self-Defense Force
- Ariake (ferry), a ferry shipwrecked in 2009
- SS Ariake Maru, a Japanese World War II ship torpedoed and sunk in February 1944
