= Kuki Station =

Kuki Station is the name of two train stations in Japan.

- Kuki Station (Mie) - (九鬼駅) in Owase, Mie Prefecture
- Kuki Station (Saitama) - (久喜駅) in Kuki, Saitama Prefecture
