= Hadasu Station =

Railway station in Kumano, Mie Prefecture, Japan

Hadasu Station 波田須駅
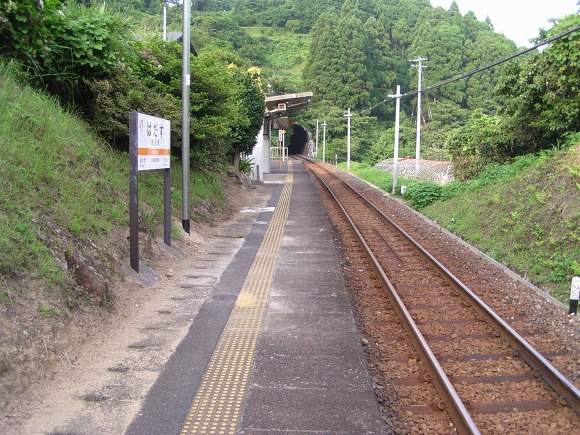
- Hadasu Station

General information
- Location: 713 Hadasu-cho, Kumano-shi, Mie-ken 519-4207; Japan
- Coordinates: 33.9102°N 136.1381°E
- Operator: JR Tōkai
- Line: ■ Kisei Main Line
- Distance: 153.2 km from Kameyama
- Platforms: 1 side platform
- Tracks: 1
- Connections: Bus terminal

Construction
- Structure type: Ground level

Other information
- Status: Unstaffed

History
- Opened: 12 December 1961

Passengers
- FY2019: 14 daily

Services
Preceding station	JR Central	Following station
Odomari towards Shingū	Kisei Main Line Local	Atashika towards Nagoya
Location
- Location within Mie Prefecture Location within Japan

Hadasu Station (波田須駅, Hadasu-eki) is a passenger railway station in located in the city of Kumano, Mie Prefecture, Japan, operated by Central Japan Railway Company (JR Tōkai).

== Lines ==
Hadasu Station is served by the Kisei Main Line, and is located 153.2 km (95.2 mi) from the terminus of the line at Kameyama Station.

== Station layout ==
The station consists of a single side platform serving bi-directional traffic. There is no station building, and there is only a small shelter on the platform. The station is unattended.

=== Platforms ===
1	■ Kisei Main Line	For Kumanoshi and Shingū; For Misedani, Taki, Matsusaka and Kameyama

== History ==
Hadasu Station opened on 12 December 1961 as a station on the Japan National Railways (JNR) Kisei Main Line. The station was absorbed into the JR Central network upon the privatization of the JNR on 1 April 1987.

== Passenger statistics ==
In fiscal 2019, the station was used by an average of 14 passengers daily (boarding passengers only).

== Surrounding area ==
- Hadasu Children's Center
- Hadasu Shrine

== See also ==
- List of railway stations in Japan
