= Mikisato Station =

Railway station in Owase, Mie Prefecture, Japan

Mikisato Station 三木里駅
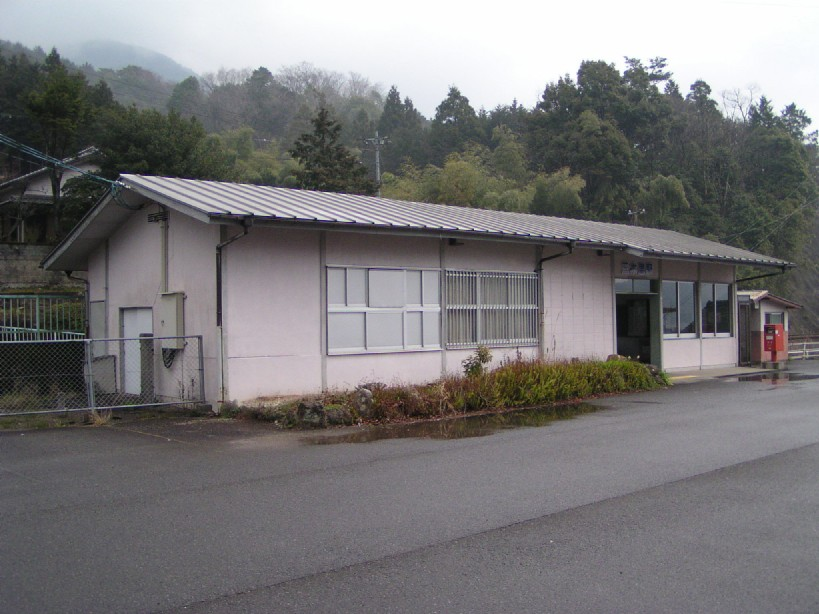
- Mikisato Station

General information
- Location: 1074 Mikisato-cho, Owase-shi, Mie-ken 519-3811; Japan
- Coordinates: 34.0014°N 136.2022°E
- Operator: JR Tōkai
- Line: ■ Kisei Main Line
- Distance: 138.5 km from Kameyama
- Platforms: 2 side platforms
- Tracks: 2 (1 closed)
- Connections: Bus terminal

Construction
- Structure type: Ground level

Other information
- Status: Unstaffed

History
- Opened: 23 April 1958

Passengers
- FY2019: 48 daily

Services
Preceding station	JR Central	Following station
Kata towards Shingū	Kisei Main Line Local	Kuki towards Nagoya
Location
- Location within Mie Prefecture Location within Japan

Mikisato Station (三木里駅, Mikisato-eki) is a passenger railway station in located in the city of Owase, Mie Prefecture, Japan, operated by Central Japan Railway Company (JR Tōkai).

== Lines ==
Mikisato Station is served by the Kisei Main Line, and is located 138.5 km (86.1 mi) from the terminus of the line at Kameyama Station.

== Station layout ==
The station consists of two opposed side platforms connected to the station building by a footbridge. The small station building dates from the original construction of the line. The station is unattended. At present, the station operates as a single side platform for bidirectional traffic, with the overpass closed off and Platform 2 out of service.

=== Platforms ===
1	■ Kisei Main Line	For Shingū; For Owase, Nagoya

== History ==
Mikisato Station opened on 23 April 1958 as a station on the Japan National Railways (JNR) Kisei Main Line. The station has been unattended since 21 December 1983. The station was absorbed into the JR Central network upon the privatization of the JNR on 1 April 1987. On 10 April 2005 use of Platform 2 was discontinued.

== Passenger statistics ==
In fiscal 2019, the station was used by an average of 48 passengers daily (boarding passengers only).

== Surrounding area ==
- Honen-ji Buddhist temple

== See also ==
- List of railway stations in Japan
