= Ōdomari Station =

Railway station in Kumano, Mie Prefecture, Japan

Ōdomari Station 大泊駅
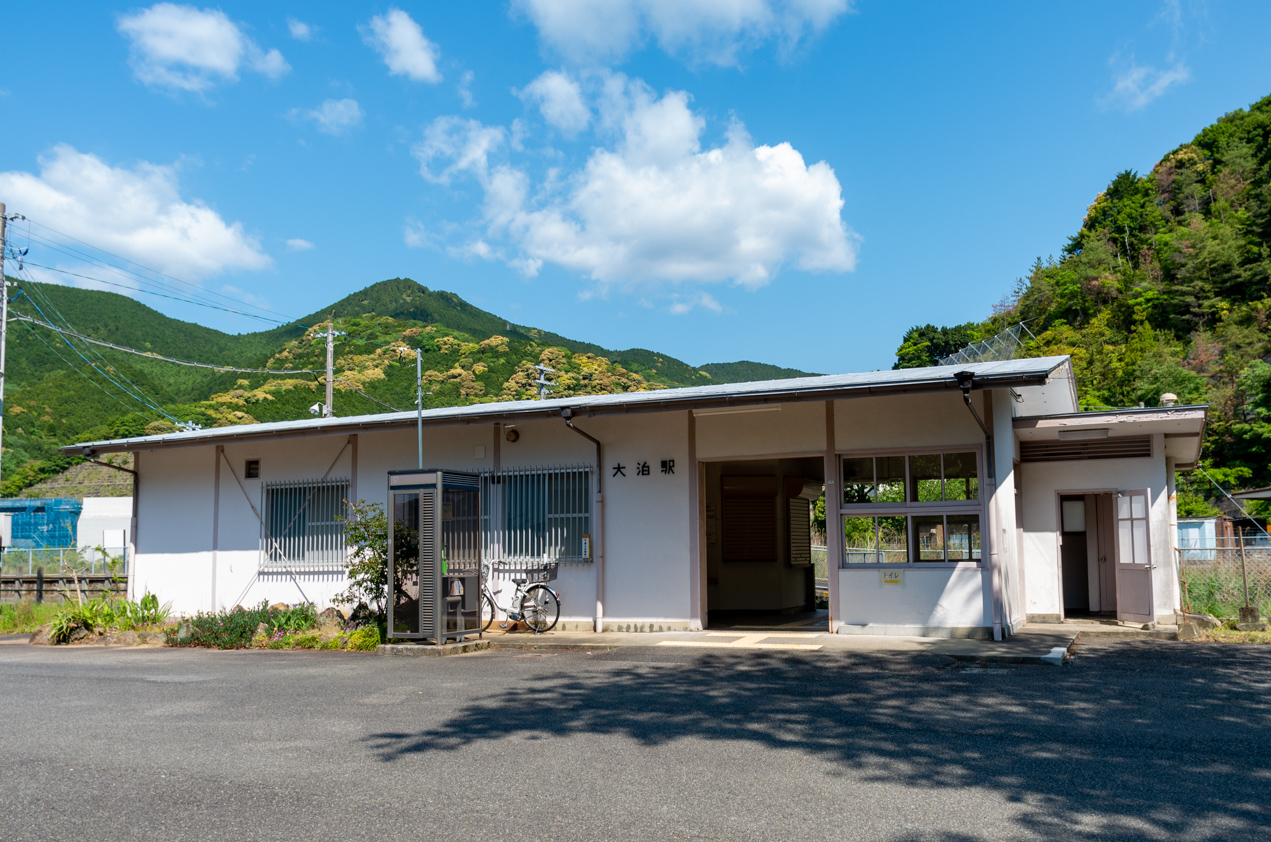
- Ōdomari Station

General information
- Location: 153 Ōdomari-cho, Kumano-shi, Mie-ken 519-4322; Japan
- Coordinates: 33.9023°N 136.1180°E
- Operator: JR Tōkai
- Line: ■ Kisei Main Line
- Distance: 155.2 km from Kameyama
- Platforms: 1 side platform
- Connections: Bus terminal

Other information
- Status: Unstaffed

History
- Opened: April 1, 1956

Passengers
- FY2019: 4 daily
Location
- Location within Mie Prefecture Location within Japan

Ōdomari Station (大泊駅, Ōdomari-eki) is a passenger railway station in located in the city of Kumano, Mie Prefecture, Japan, operated by Central Japan Railway Company (JR Tōkai).

== Lines ==
Ōdomari Station is served by the Kisei Main Line, and is located 155.2 rail kilometers from the terminus of the line at Kameyama Station.

== Station layout ==
The station consists of a single side platform serving bi-directional traffic. The small wooden station building dates from the original construction of the line. The station is unattended.

=== Platforms ===
1	■ Kisei Main Line	For Shingū; For Owase, Nagoya

== Adjacent stations ==
«	Service	»
Central Japan Railway Company (JR Central)
Kisei Main Line
Limited Express "Nanki": Does not stop at this station
Hadasu	Local	Kumanoshi

== History ==
Ōdomari Station opened on April 1, 1956 as a station on the Japan National Railways (JNR) Kisei-Nishi Line. The line was renamed the Kisei Main Line on July 15, 1959. The station has been unattended since November 1, 1986. The station was absorbed into the JR Central network upon the privatization of the JNR on April 1, 1987.

== Passenger statistics ==
In fiscal 2019, the station was used by an average of 4 passengers daily (boarding passengers only).

== Surrounding area ==
- Odomari Beach
- Japan National Route 311

== See also ==
- List of railway stations in Japan
