= Kata Station =

Railway station in Owase, Mie Prefecture, Japan

Kata Station 賀田駅
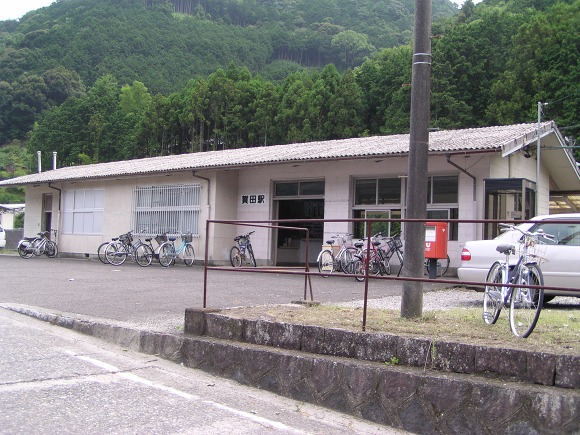
- Kata Station

General information
- Location: 840 Sone-cho, Owase-shi, Mie-ken 519-3924; Japan
- Coordinates: 33.9717°N 136.1897°E
- Operator: JR Tōkai
- Line: ■ Kisei Main Line
- Distance: 142.6 km from Kameyama
- Platforms: 1 island platform
- Tracks: 2
- Connections: Bus terminal

Construction
- Structure type: Ground level

Other information
- Status: Unstaffed

History
- Opened: 15 July 1959

Passengers
- FY2019: 36 daily

Services
Preceding station	JR Central	Following station
Nigishima towards Shingū	Kisei Main Line Local	Mikisato towards Nagoya
Location
- Location within Mie Prefecture Location within Japan

Kata Station (賀田駅, Kata-eki) is a passenger railway station in located in the city of Owase, Mie Prefecture, Japan, operated by Central Japan Railway Company (JR Tōkai).

== Lines ==
Kata Station is served by the Kisei Main Line, and is located 142.6 km (88.6 mi) from the terminus of the line at Kameyama Station.

== Station layout ==
The station consists of a single island platform connected to the station building by a level crossing. The small station building dates from the original construction of the line. The station is unattended.

=== Platforms ===
1	■ Kisei Main Line	for Shingū
2	■ Kisei Main Line	for Owase, and Nagoya

== History ==
Kata Station opened on 15 July 1959 as a station on the Japan National Railways (JNR) Kisei Main Line. The station has been unattended since 21 December 1983. The station was absorbed into the JR Central network upon the privatization of the JNR on 1 April 1987.

== Passenger statistics ==
In fiscal 2019, the station was used by an average of 36 passengers daily (boarding passengers only).

== Surrounding area ==
This station is located approximately halfway between the two villages of Kata, which is located in the north of the station, and Sone, which is located in the south.

== See also ==
- List of railway stations in Japan
