= Nigishima Station =

Railway station in Kumano, Mie Prefecture, Japan

Nigishima Station 二木島駅
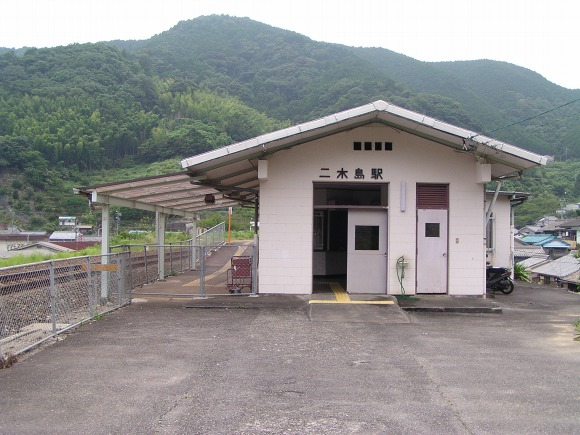
- Nigishima Station

General information
- Location: 540 Nigishima-cho, Kumano-shi, Mie-ken 519-4204; Japan
- Coordinates: 33.9391°N 136.1805°E
- Operator: JR Tōkai
- Line: ■ Kisei Main Line
- Distance: 146.8 km from Kameyama
- Platforms: 1 side platform
- Tracks: 1
- Connections: Bus terminal

Construction
- Structure type: Ground level

Other information
- Status: Unstaffed

History
- Opened: 15 July 1959

Passengers
- FY2019: 19 daily

Services
Preceding station	JR Central	Following station
Atashika towards Shingū	Kisei Main Line Local	Kata towards Nagoya
Location
- Location within Mie Prefecture Location within Japan

Nigishima Station (二木島駅, Nigishima-eki) is a passenger railway station in located in the city of Kumano, Mie Prefecture, Japan, operated by Central Japan Railway Company (JR Tōkai).

== Lines ==
Nigishima Station is served by the Kisei Main Line, and is located 146.8 km (91.2 mi) from the terminus of the line at Kameyama Station.

== Station layout ==
The station consists of a single side platform serving bi-directional traffic. The small wooden station building dates from the original construction of the line. The station is unattended.

=== Platforms ===
1	■ Kisei Main Line	For Shingū; For Owase, Nagoya

== History ==
Nigishima Station opened on 15 July 1959 as a station on the Japan National Railways (JNR) Kisei Main Line. The station has been unattended since 21 December 1983. The station was absorbed into the JR Central network upon the privatization of the JNR on 1 April 1987.

== Passenger statistics ==
In fiscal 2019, the station was used by an average of 19 passengers daily (boarding passengers only).

== Surrounding area ==
- Kumano City Hall Arasaka Branch Office
- Nigishimacho Public Hall
- Nigishima Fishing Village Center
- Kumano City Arasaka Elementary School
- Kumano City Arasaka Junior High School

== See also ==
- List of railway stations in Japan
