= Atashika Station =

Railway station in Kumano, Mie Prefecture, Japan

Atashika Station 新鹿駅
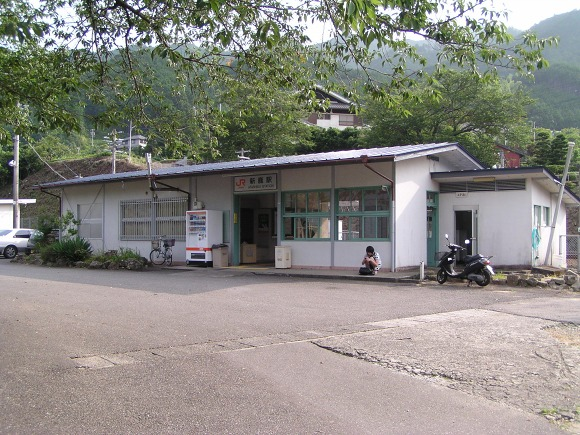
- Atashika Station

General information
- Location: 364 Atashika-cho, Kumano-shi, Mie-ken 519-4206; Japan
- Coordinates: 33.9280°N 136.1441°E
- Operator: JR Tōkai
- Line: ■ Kisei Main Line
- Distance: 150.6 km from Kameyama
- Platforms: 1 island platform
- Tracks: 2
- Connections: Bus terminal

Construction
- Structure type: Ground level

Other information
- Status: Unstaffed

History
- Opened: 1 April 1956

Passengers
- FY2019: 47 daily

Services
Preceding station	JR Central	Following station
Hadasu towards Shingū	Kisei Main Line Local	Nigishima towards Nagoya
Location
- Location within Mie Prefecture Location within Japan

Atashika Station (新鹿駅, Atashika-eki) is a passenger railway station in located in the city of Kumano, Mie Prefecture, Japan, operated by Central Japan Railway Company (JR Tōkai).

== Lines ==
Atashika Station is served by the Kisei Main Line, and is located 150.6 km (93.6 mi) from the terminus of the line at Kameyama Station.

== Station layout ==
The station consists of a single island platform connected to the small station building, which dates from the opening of the line, by a barrier-protected pedestrian level crossing. The station is unattended.

=== Platforms ===
1	■ Kisei Main Line	For Shingū
2	■ Kisei Main Line	For Owase, Nagoya

== History ==
Atashika Station opened on 1 April 1956, as a station on the Japan National Railways (JNR) Kisei-Nishi Line. The line was renamed the Kisei Main Line on 15 July 1959. The station has been unattended since 1 November 1986. The station was absorbed into the JR Central network upon the privatization of the JNR on 1 April 1987.

== Passenger statistics ==
In fiscal 2019, the station was used by an average of 47 passengers daily (boarding passengers only).

== Surrounding area ==
- Atashika beach
- Kumano City Hall Atashika Branch Office
- Kumano City Atashika Elementary School
- Kumano City Shinka Junior High School

== See also ==
- List of railway stations in Japan
