= Kihō =

Kihō 紀宝町
- Town
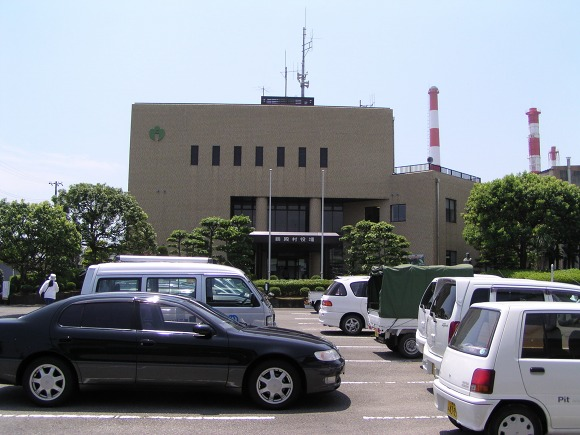
- Kihō Town Office

- Flag Seal
- Interactive map of Kihō
- Coordinates: 33°44′N 136°0′E
- Country: Japan
- Region: Kansai
- Prefecture: Mie
- District: Minamimuro

Government
  - Mayor: Ken Nishida

Area
  - Total: 79.62 km^{2} (30.74 sq mi)

Population (April 2021)
  - Total: 10,818
  - Density: 135.9/km^{2} (351.9/sq mi)
- Time zone: UTC+9 (Japan Standard Time)
- Tree: Quercus
- Flower: Cymbidium kanran, Narcissus
- Phone number: 0735-33-0333
- Address: 324 Minami-Udono, Kihō-chō, Minamimuro-gun, Mie-ken 519-5701
- Website: Official website

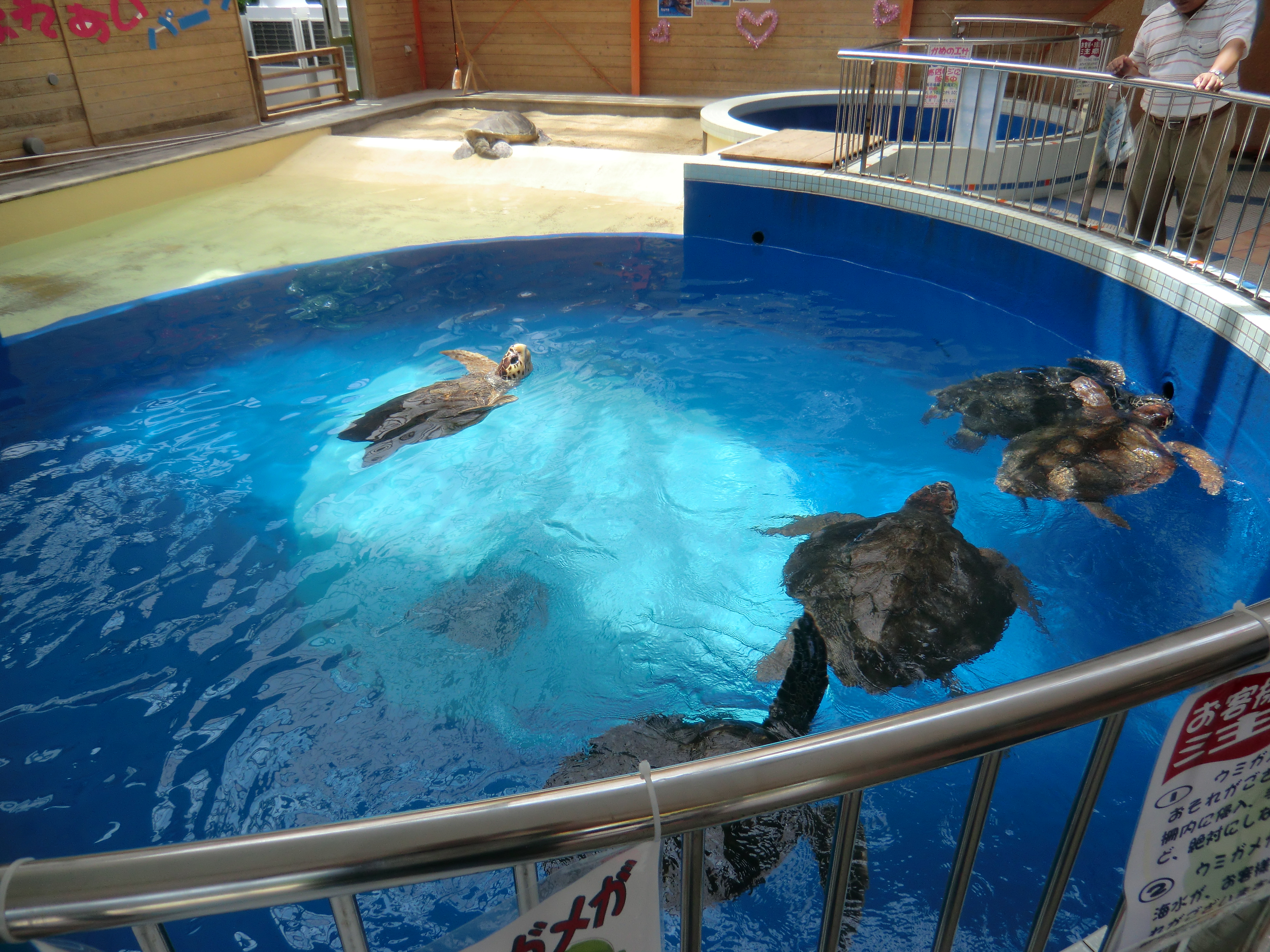
Kihō Sea Turtle Park

Kihō (紀宝町, Kihō-chō) is a town located in Mie Prefecture, Japan. As of 1 April 2021, the town had an estimated population of 10,818 in 5,247 households and a population density of 140 persons per km^{2}. The total area of the town is 79.62 square kilometres (30.74 sq mi).

== Geography ==
Kihō is located near the southern tip of the Kii Peninsula, facing the Pacific Ocean, and is at the extreme southern point of Mie Prefecture, separated from Wakayama Prefecture by the Kumano River. Parts of the town are within the limits of the Yoshino-Kumano National Park. A portion of the Sacred Sites and Pilgrimage Routes in the Kii Mountain Range, a UNESCO World Heritage Site is located within Kihō.

== Climate ==
Kihō has a humid subtropical climate (Köppen Cfa) characterized by warm summers and cool winters with light to no snowfall. The average annual temperature in Kihō is 16.0 °C. The average annual rainfall is 2,596 mm with September as the wettest month. The temperatures are highest on average in August, at around 25.8 °C, and lowest in January, at around 6.1 °C.

== Demographics ==
The population of Kihō increased significantly after World War II and has remained broadly stable since then.

Historical population
Year	Pop.	±%
1920	9,453	—
1930	8,577	−9.3%
1940	8,825	+2.9%
1950	11,546	+30.8%
1960	11,685	+1.2%
1970	10,899	−6.7%
1980	12,177	+11.7%
1990	12,919	+6.1%
2000	12,824	−0.7%
2010	11,897	−7.2%

== History ==
The area of Kihō was part of the holdings of the Kii Tokugawa clan, administered as part of the Kii-Shingū Domain in the Edo period. After the Meiji restoration, the area was organized into the villages of Ida, Mifune, and Onodani within Minamimuro District of Mie Prefecture. The town of Kihō was established on October 31, 1951, by the merger of these three villages. On January 10, 2006, the village of Udono – which was part of the Minamimuro District until then – was merged into Kihō.

== Government ==
Kihō has a mayor-council form of government with a directly elected mayor and a unicameral town council of 14 members. Kihō, collectively with the city of Kumano and town of Mihama, contributes two members to the Mie Prefectural Assembly. In terms of national politics, the town is part of Mie 4th district of the lower house of the Diet of Japan.

== Economy ==
Kihō serves as a commercial center for the surrounding region. Hokuetsu Paper Mills is a major industrial employer.

== Education ==
Kihō has seven public elementary schools and two public middle schools operated by the city government. The town does not have a high school.

== Transportation ==
=== Railway ===
JR Tōkai – Kisei Main Line

- Kii-Ida – Udono

=== Highway ===
- Shingū-Kihō Expressway
- National Route 42
