= Japanese destroyer Ariake =

Four Japanese destroyers have been named Ariake (有明 / ありあけ, ”dawn” or "daybreak"):

- Japanese destroyer Ariake (1904), a Harusame-class destroyer of the Imperial Japanese Navy (IJN) during the Russo-Japanese War
- Japanese destroyer Ariake (1934), a Hatsuharu-class destroyer of the IJN during World War II
- JDS Ariake (DD-183), a destroyer of the Japanese Maritime Self-Defense Force (JMSDF), formerly USS Heywood L. Edwards (DD-663)
- JS Ariake (DD-109), a Murasame-class destroyer (1994) of the JMSDF launched in 2000

== See also ==
- Ariake (disambiguation)
