= Nakamurayama Castle =

Coordinates: 34°04′20″N 136°11′34″E

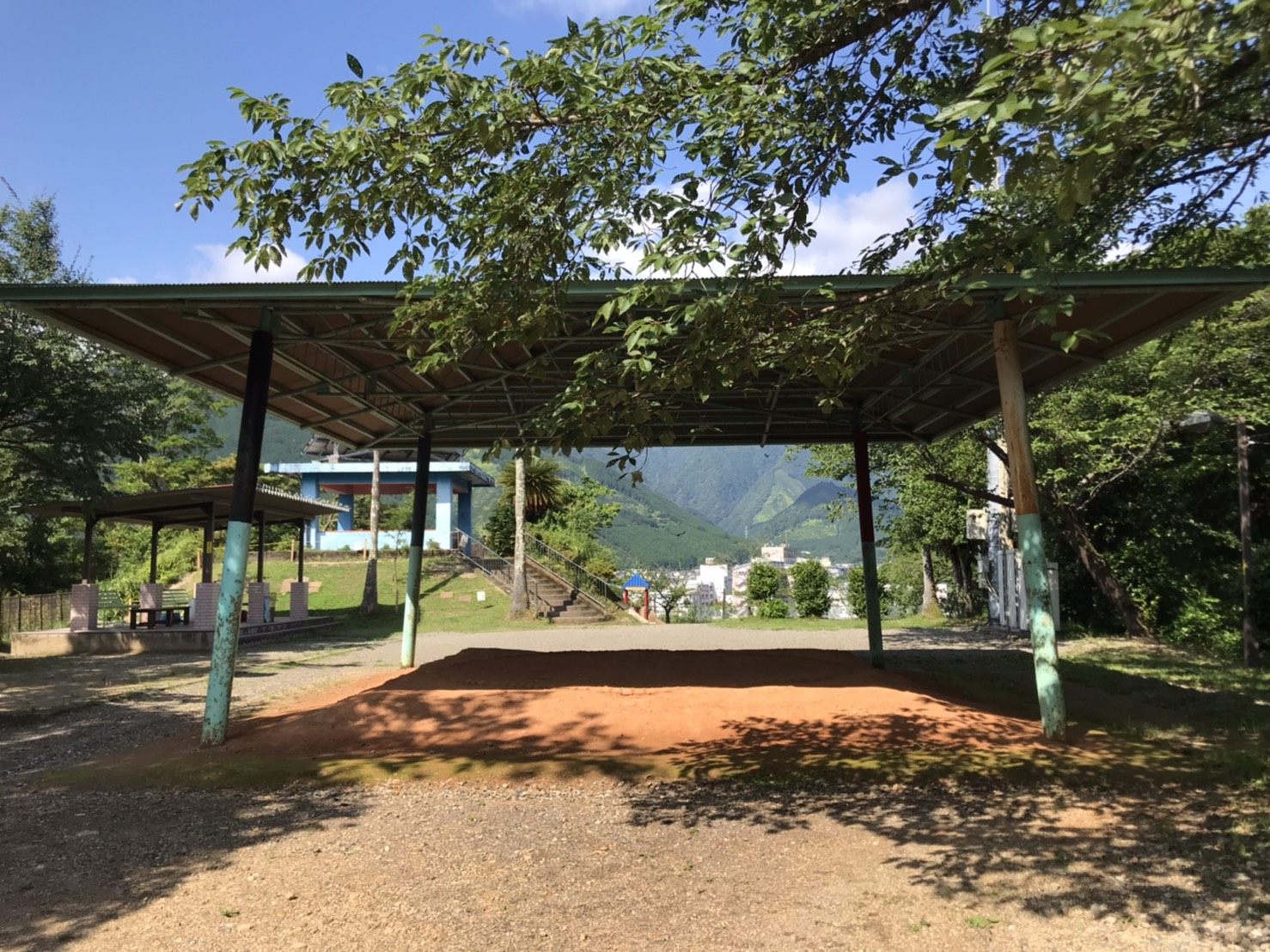
Honmaru in Nakamurayama Castle

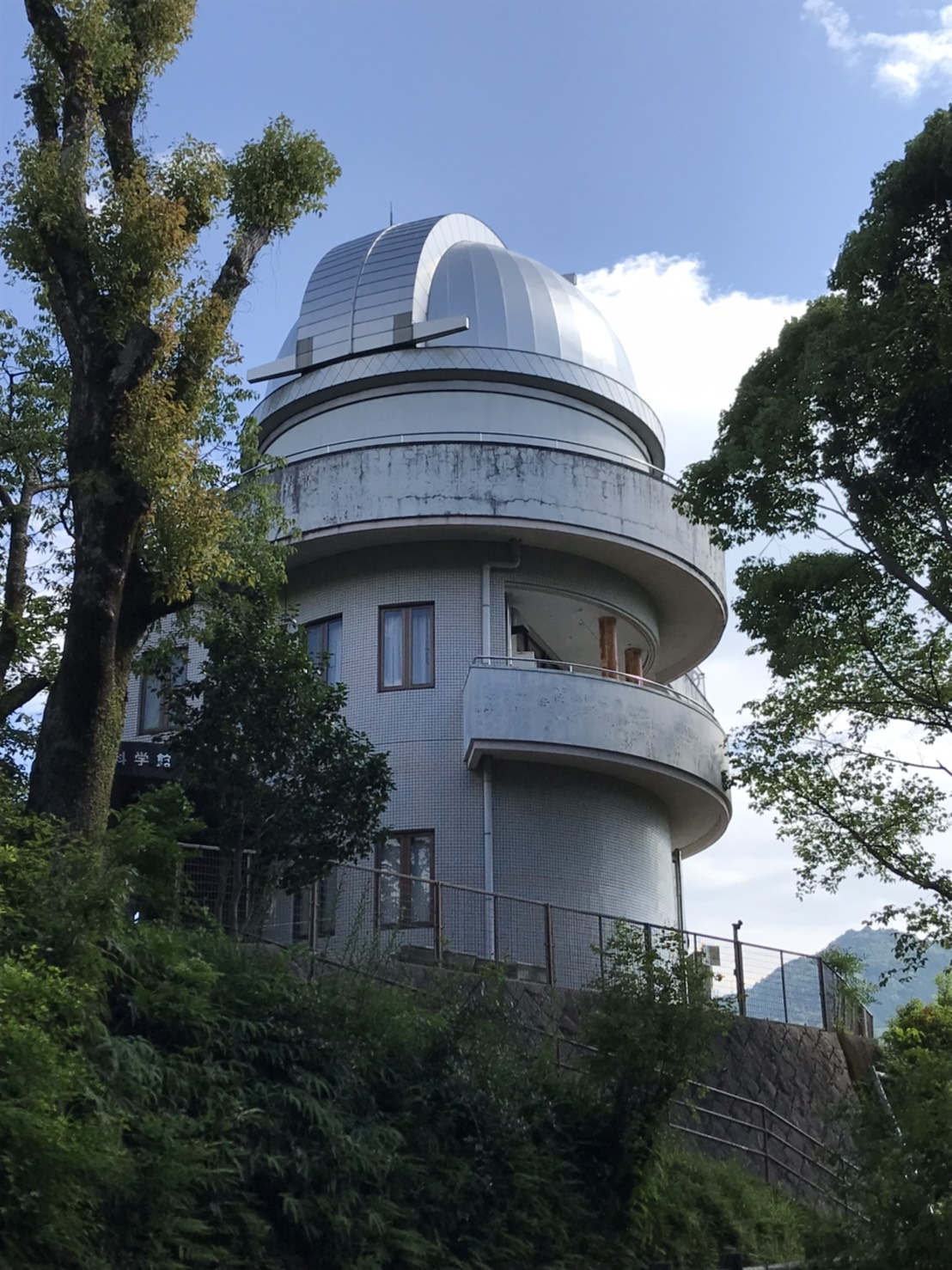
Ninomaru & sannomaru in Nakamurayama Castle

Nakamurayama Castle (中村山城, Nakamurayama-jō) was a hirayamashiro (平山城, castle constructed on a hill) located in Owase, Mie Prefecture, Japan. It was built by Naka Sinhachirō.

== History ==
The castle was built around the Sengoku period, but was attacked by Horinouchi Ujiyoshi and it fell in 1582. The few remains that survive from that era are maintained in the present day as a park.

== See also ==
- Japanese castle
