= Kumano, Mie =

Kumano 熊野市
- City
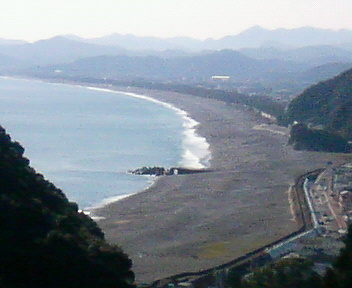
- Shichirimihama Beach, Kumano

- Flag Emblem
- Interactive map of Kumano
- Coordinates: 33°53′19.1″N 136°6′0.8″E
- Country: Japan
- Region: Kansai
- Prefecture: Mie

Government
  - Mayor: Kanji Kawakami

Area
  - Total: 373.35 km^{2} (144.15 sq mi)

Population (July 2021)
  - Total: 16,232
  - Density: 43.477/km^{2} (112.60/sq mi)
- Time zone: UTC+9 (Japan Standard Time)
- Phone number: 0597-89-4111
- Address: 796 Idochō, Kumano-shi, Mie-ken 519-4392
- Climate: Cfa
- Website: Official website
- Symbols
- Bird: Japanese bush-warbler
- Flower: Sasayuri (Lilium japonicum)
- Tree: Cryptomeria

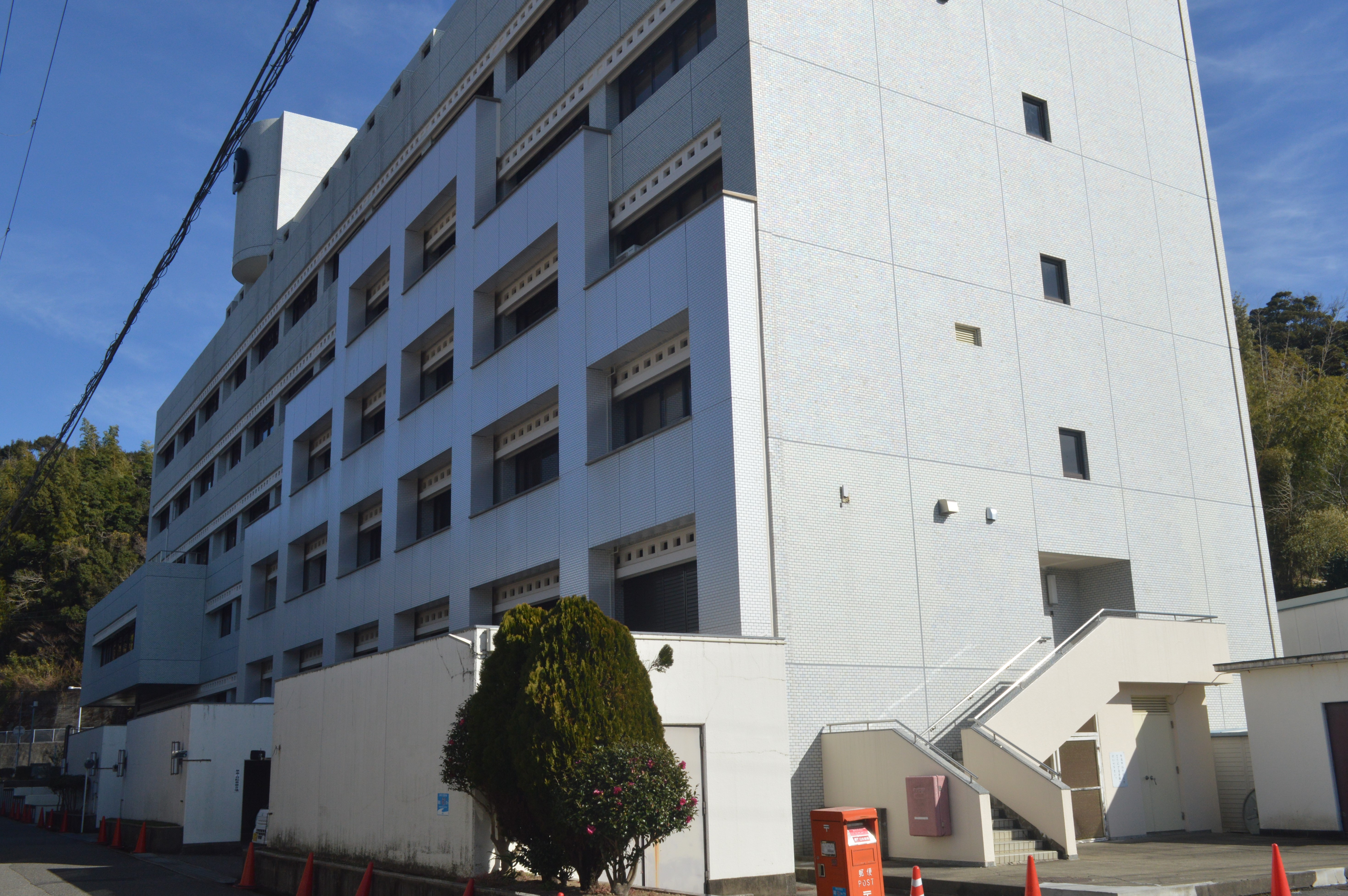
Kumano City Hall

Kumano (熊野市, Kumano-shi) is a city located in Mie Prefecture, Japan. As of 1 July 2021, the city had an estimated population of 16,232 in 8,746 households and a population density of 43 persons per km^{2}. The total area of the city is 373.35 square kilometres (144.15 sq mi).

== Geography ==
Kumano is located near the southern tip of the Kii Peninsula, in southern Mie Prefecture, facing the Pacific Ocean. Parts of the city are within the limits of the Yoshino-Kumano National Park.

=== Climate ===
Kumano has a humid subtropical climate (Köppen Cfa) characterized by warm summers and cool winters with light to no snowfall. The average annual temperature in Kumano is 16.8 °C (62.2 °F). The average annual rainfall is 3,111.2 mm (122.49 in) with September as the wettest month. The temperatures are highest on average in August, at around 27.0 °C (80.6 °F), and lowest in January, at around 6.8 °C (44.2 °F).

Climate data for Kumano-Shingu (2002−2020 normals, extremes 2002−present)
Month	Jan	Feb	Mar	Apr	May	Jun	Jul	Aug	Sep	Oct	Nov	Dec	Year
Record high °C (°F)	21.4 (70.5)	24.7 (76.5)	26.8 (80.2)	32.2 (90.0)	31.3 (88.3)	35.8 (96.4)	37.7 (99.9)	38.6 (101.5)	36.4 (97.5)	31.0 (87.8)	25.2 (77.4)	24.4 (75.9)	38.6 (101.5)
Mean daily maximum °C (°F)	11.3 (52.3)	12.5 (54.5)	15.3 (59.5)	19.6 (67.3)	23.3 (73.9)	25.9 (78.6)	29.6 (85.3)	31.1 (88.0)	28.3 (82.9)	23.6 (74.5)	18.8 (65.8)	13.8 (56.8)	21.1 (70.0)
Daily mean °C (°F)	6.8 (44.2)	8.0 (46.4)	10.7 (51.3)	15.1 (59.2)	19.0 (66.2)	22.1 (71.8)	25.7 (78.3)	27.0 (80.6)	24.2 (75.6)	19.5 (67.1)	14.4 (57.9)	9.2 (48.6)	16.8 (62.3)
Mean daily minimum °C (°F)	2.8 (37.0)	3.8 (38.8)	6.2 (43.2)	10.8 (51.4)	15.1 (59.2)	18.9 (66.0)	22.7 (72.9)	23.8 (74.8)	21.2 (70.2)	16.3 (61.3)	10.7 (51.3)	5.4 (41.7)	13.1 (55.7)
Record low °C (°F)	−3.4 (25.9)	−2.9 (26.8)	−1.9 (28.6)	2.5 (36.5)	8.2 (46.8)	13.2 (55.8)	18.3 (64.9)	16.6 (61.9)	14.4 (57.9)	7.4 (45.3)	1.3 (34.3)	−1.7 (28.9)	−3.4 (25.9)
Average precipitation mm (inches)	92.6 (3.65)	121.6 (4.79)	208.4 (8.20)	270.1 (10.63)	273.6 (10.77)	388.9 (15.31)	356.9 (14.05)	265.4 (10.45)	476.1 (18.74)	383.7 (15.11)	164.1 (6.46)	109.8 (4.32)	3,111.2 (122.49)
Average precipitation days (≥ 1.0 mm)	5.6	7.0	9.5	9.8	11.1	14.2	12.5	11.5	13.6	11.8	8.0	6.0	120.6
Mean monthly sunshine hours	194.6	176.0	204.2	199.3	196.5	134.1	168.0	205.7	147.6	143.5	167.7	187.1	2,124.3
Source: Japan Meteorological Agency

=== Demographics ===
The population of Kumano has decreased steadily over the past 60 years.

Historical population
Year	Pop.	±%
1960	39,150	—
1970	32,909	−15.9%
1980	28,720	−12.7%
1990	25,783	−10.2%
2000	22,640	−12.2%
2010	19,675	−13.1%

== History ==
The area of the modern city of Kumano was within ancient Kii Province and was part of the holdings of the Kii Tokugawa clan, and administered as part of the Kii-Shingū Domain in the Edo period. After the Meiji restoration, the town of Kinomoto was established within Minamimuro District with the early Meiji period creation of the modern municipalities system on April 1, 1889. The city of Kumano was established on November 3, 1954, by the merger of Kinomoto with the surrounding villages of Isato, Kamikawa, Arii, Atashika, Arasaki and Tomari (all from Minamimuro District).

On November 15, 2005, the town of Kiwa (also from Minamimuro District) was also merged into Kumano.

== Government ==
Kumano has a mayor-council form of government with a directly elected mayor and a unicameral city council of 14 members. Kumano, collectively with the towns of Mihama of Kihō, contributes two members to the Mie Prefectural Assembly. In terms of national politics, the city is part of Mie 4th district of the lower house of the Diet of Japan.

== Economy ==
The economy of Kumano is centered on commercial fishing, forestry and horticulture (oranges). Kumano is also known for its Nachiguro-ishi which can be used to make inkstone and black Go stones.

== Education ==
Kumano has nine public elementary schools and seven public middle schools operated by the city government and one public high school operated by the Mie Prefectural Department of Education. The prefecture also operates one special education school for the handicapped.

== Transportation ==
=== Railway ===
JR Tōkai – Kisei Main Line

- Nigishima - Atashika - Hadasu - Ōdomari - Kumanoshi - Arii

=== Highway ===
- National Route 42
- National Route 169
- National Route 309
- National Route 311

== Local attractions ==
A portion of the Sacred Sites and Pilgrimage Routes in the Kii Mountain Range, a UNESCO World Heritage Site is located within Kumano.

== Sister cities ==
- Bastos, Brazil, since December 1972
- Sakurai, Nara, Japan, since October 1986
- Sorrento, Italy, since November 2001

== Notable people ==
- Hikoroku Arimoto – Olympic gymnast
- Shigeru Kasamatsu – Olympic gymnast
