= Kōshiyama Station =

Railway station in Mihama, Mie Prefecture, Japan

Kōshiyama Station 神志山駅
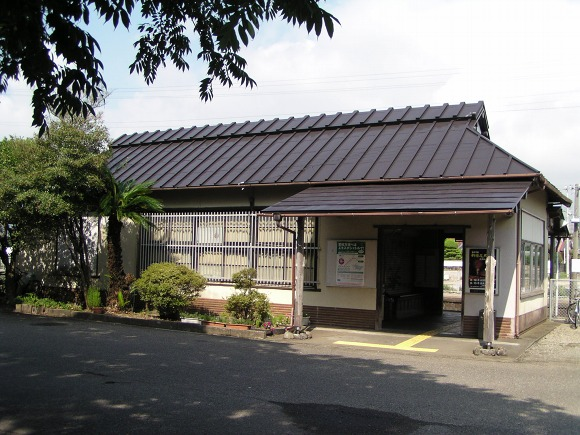
- Kōshiyama Station

General information
- Location: 4649 Ichigi, Mihama-machi, Minamimuro-gun, Mie-ken 519-5203; Japan
- Coordinates: 33.8398°N 136.0622°E
- Operator: JR Tōkai
- Line: Kisei Main Line
- Distance: 164.1 km from Kameyama
- Platforms: 2 side platforms
- Tracks: 2
- Connections: Bus terminal

Other information
- Status: Unstaffed

History
- Opened: 8 August 1940

Passengers
- FY2019: 84 daily

Services
Preceding station	JR Central	Following station
Kii-Ichigi towards Shingū	Kisei Main Line Local	Arii towards Nagoya
Location
- Location within Mie Prefecture Location within Japan

Kōshiyama Station (神志山駅, Kōshiyama-eki) is a passenger railway station in located in the town of Mihama, Minamimuro District, Mie, Japan, operated by Central Japan Railway Company (JR Tōkai).

== Lines ==
Kōshiyama Station is served by the Kisei Main Line, and is located 164.1 km (102.0 mi) from the terminus of the line at Kameyama Station.

== Station layout ==
The station consists of two opposed side platforms connected by a footbridge. The small wooden station building dates from the original construction of the line. The station is unattended.

=== Platforms ===
1	■ Kisei Main Line	for Shingū
2	■ Kisei Main Line	for Owase, and Nagoya

== History ==
Kōshiyama Station opened on 8 August 1940 as a station on the Japanese Government Railways (JGR) Kisei-Nishi Line. The JGR became the Japan National Railways (JNR) after World War II, and the line was renamed the Kisei Main Line on 15 July 1959. The station has been unattended since 1983. The station was absorbed into the JR Central network upon the privatization of the JNR on 1 April 1987.

== Passenger statistics ==
In fiscal 2019, the station was used by an average of 84 passengers daily (boarding passengers only).

== Surrounding area ==
- Mihama Municipal Mihama Junior High School
- Mihama Municipal Koshiyama Elementary School
- Fudo Falls

== See also ==
- List of railway stations in Japan
