= Ōsoneura Station =

Railway station in Owase, Mie Prefecture, Japan

Ōsoneura Station 大曽根浦駅
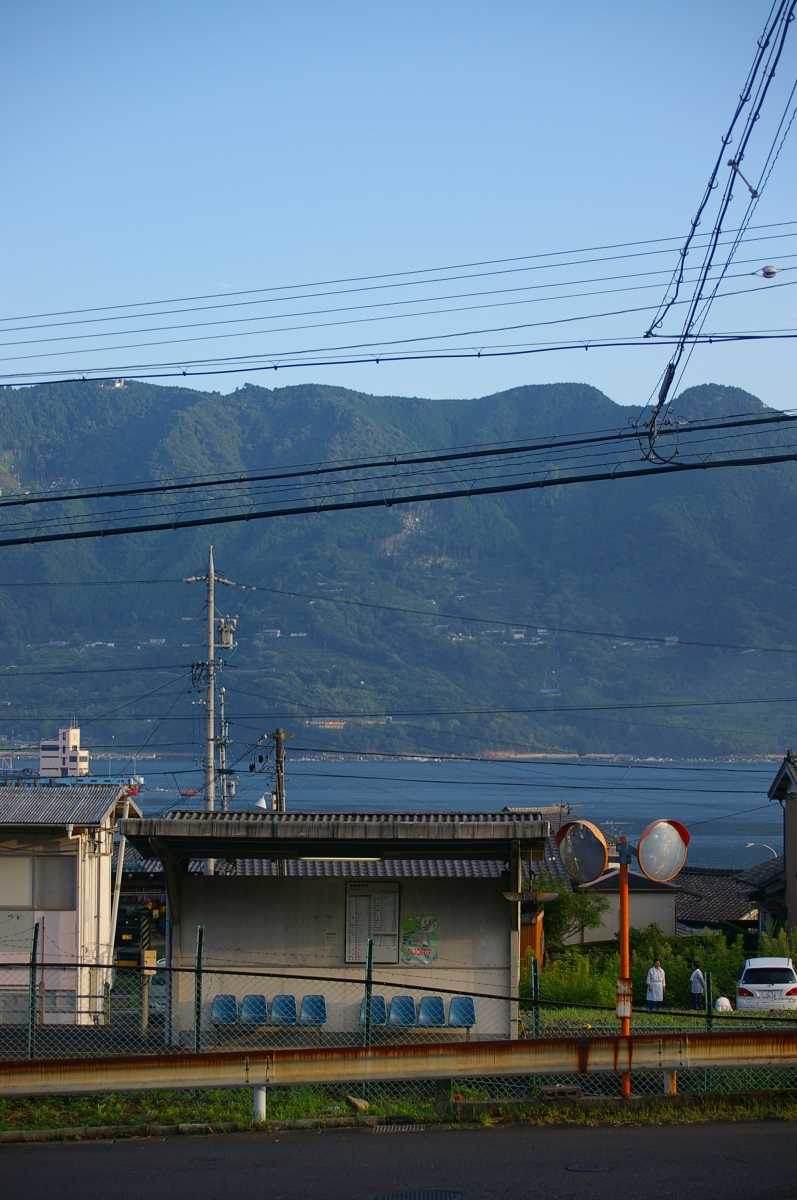
- Ōsoneura Station

General information
- Location: 127 Ōsoneura-cho, Owase-shi, Mie-ken 519-3623; Japan
- Coordinates: 34.0617°N 136.2227°E
- Operator: JR Tōkai
- Line: ■ Kisei Main Line
- Distance: 134.4 km from Kameyama
- Platforms: 1 island platform
- Tracks: 2
- Connections: Bus terminal

Construction
- Structure type: Ground level

Other information
- Status: Unstaffed

History
- Opened: 12 January 1957

Passengers
- FY2019: 6 daily

Services
Preceding station	JR Central	Following station
Kuki towards Shingū	Kisei Main Line Local	Owase towards Nagoya
Location
- Location within Mie Prefecture Location within Japan

Ōsoneura Station (大曽根浦駅, Ōsoneura-eki) is a passenger railway station in located in the city of Owase, Mie Prefecture, Japan, operated by Central Japan Railway Company (JR Tōkai).

== Lines ==
Ōsoneura Station is served by the Kisei Main Line, and is located 134.4 km (83.5 mi) from the terminus of the line at Kameyama Station.

== Station layout ==
The station consists of a single island platform connected to the station building by a level crossing. The small station building dates from the original construction of the line. The station is unattended.

=== Platforms ===
1	■ Kisei Main Line	for Shingū
2	■ Kisei Main Line	for Owase, and Nagoya

== History ==
Ōsoneura Station opened on 12 January 1957 as a station on the Japan National Railways (JNR) Kisei East Line, which was renamed the Kisei Main Line on 15 July 1959. The station has been unattended since 21 December 1983. The station was absorbed into the JR Central network upon the privatization of the JNR on 1 April 1987.

== Passenger statistics ==
In fiscal 2019, the station was used by an average of 6 passengers daily (boarding passengers only).

== Surrounding area ==
- Mie Prefecture Kumano Kodo Visitor Center

== See also ==
- List of railway stations in Japan
