= Owase =

Owase 尾鷲市
- City
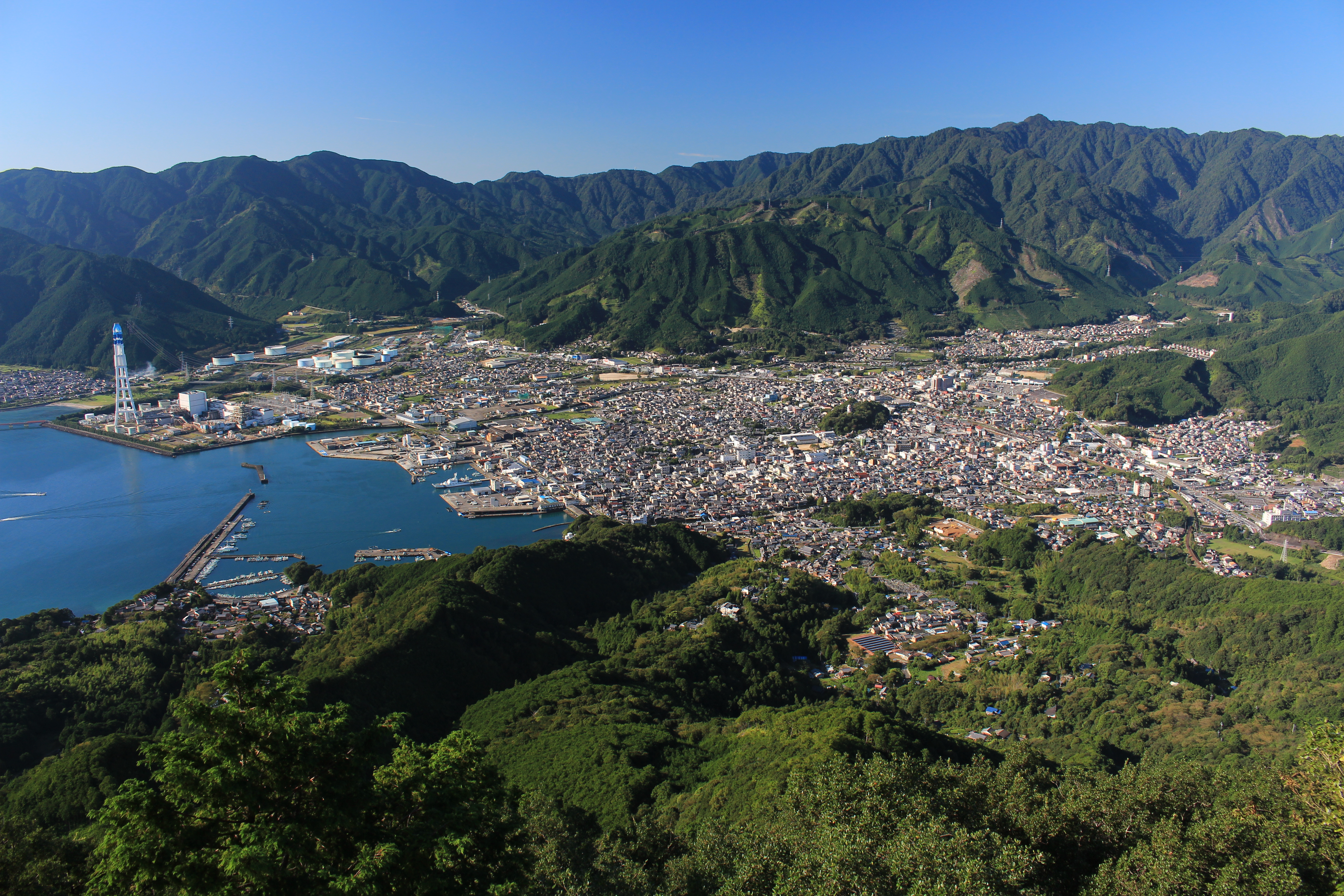
- Owase City

- Flag Seal

- Location of Owase in Mie Prefecture

- Coordinates: 34°4′14.8″N 136°11′27.5″E
- Country: Japan
- Region: Kansai
- Prefecture: Mie

Area
  - Total: 192.71 km^{2} (74.41 sq mi)

Population (August 2021)
  - Total: 16,910
  - Density: 87.75/km^{2} (227.3/sq mi)
- Time zone: UTC+9 (Japan Standard Time)
- Phone number: 0597-23-8132
- Address: 10-43 Chūōchō, Owase-shi, Mie-ken 519-3696
- Climate: Cfa
- Website: Official website
- Symbols
- Bird: Grey heron
- Fish: Japanese amberjack
- Flower: Japanese camellia
- Tree: Hinoki

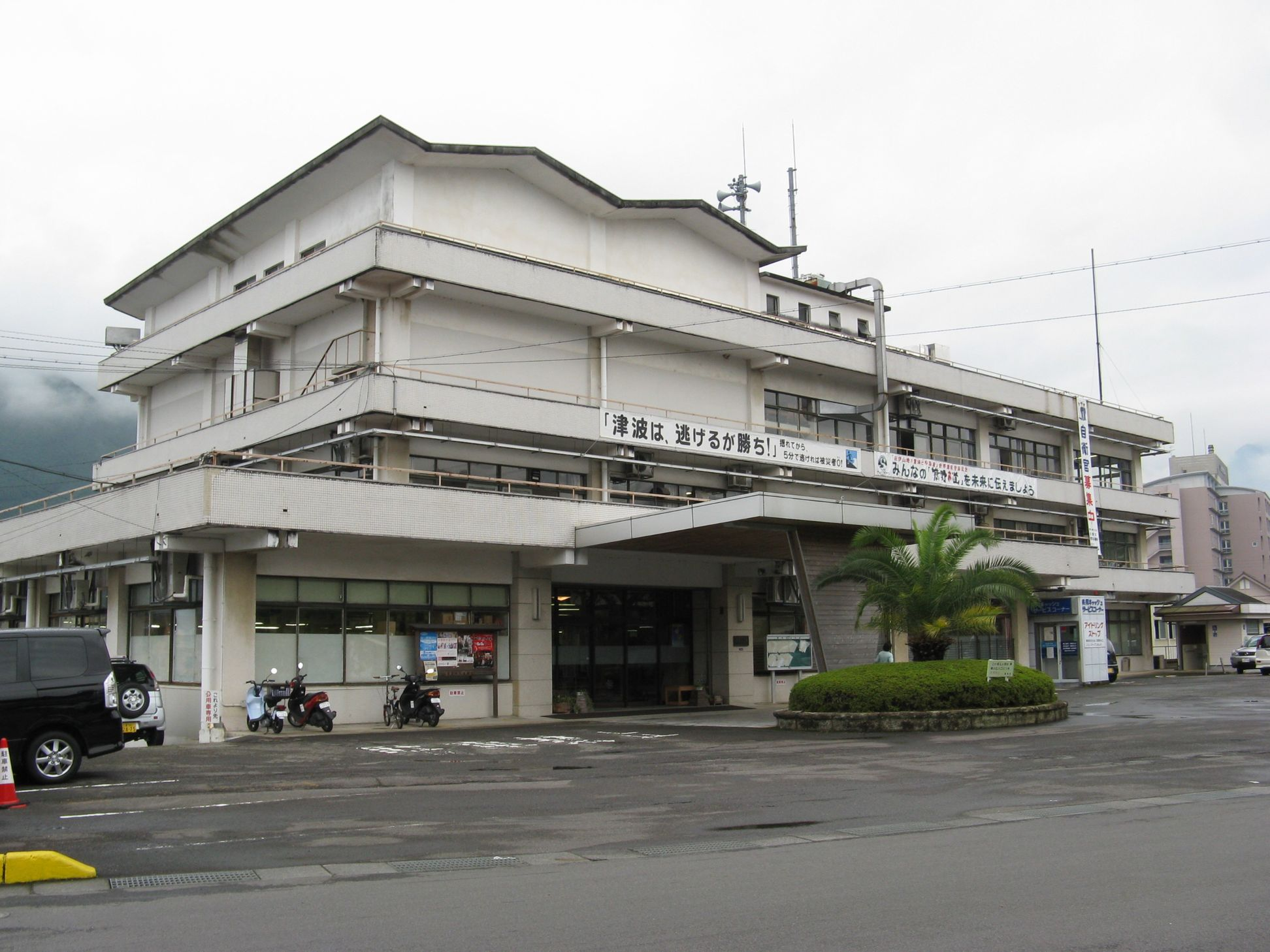
Owase City Hall

Owase (尾鷲市, Owase-shi; Japanese pronunciation: [ó̞.β̞ä̀.sè̞, ò̞.β̞ä́.sé̞.ɕì]) is a city located in Mie Prefecture, Japan. As of 1 August 2021, the city had an estimated population of 16,910, in 9,177 households. The population density was 88 persons per km^{2}. The total area of the city was 192.71 square kilometres (74.41 sq mi).

== Geography ==
Owase is located in southeastern Kii Peninsula, in southern Mie Prefecture, facing the Gulf of Kumano the Pacific Ocean. Ninety percent of the city area is forested or coastal rias. Sandwiched between mountains and the offshore Kuroshio Current, the area has very heavy rainfall from spring through autumn. More than 80% of the population is concentrated in former Owase town, on the coast.

=== Climate ===
Owase has a humid subtropical climate (Köppen climate classification Cfa). It has comfortable spring and autumn seasons, and warm winters with practically no snow. The warm Kuroshio Current makes its closest contact with the Japanese coast at Owase. Combined with the high mountains falling almost to the sea, this gives Owase an extremely heavy annual rainfall of 3,850 millimetres (150 in), which is the highest in the world at low altitudes in subtropical and warm temperate latitudes. Only certain parts of southern Chile, coastal British Columbia and the Adriatic Sea coast have as much rain at low elevations outside the tropics. Typhoons often pass Owase in summer.

Despite the excessive wetness of the climate, summers are no more uncomfortable or humid than in the rest of southern Japan. Humidity is marginally lower than in the cities close to the Seto Inland Sea or on the southern Sea of Japan.

Climate data for Owase (1991−2020 normals, extremes 1938−present)
| Month | Jan | Feb | Mar | Apr | May | Jun | Jul | Aug | Sep | Oct | Nov | Dec | Year |
|---|---|---|---|---|---|---|---|---|---|---|---|---|---|
| Record high °C (°F) | 22.4 (72.3) | 27.1 (80.8) | 26.5 (79.7) | 30.3 (86.5) | 33.1 (91.6) | 37.3 (99.1) | 38.6 (101.5) | 38.8 (101.8) | 36.6 (97.9) | 33.0 (91.4) | 29.8 (85.6) | 25.6 (78.1) | 38.8 (101.8) |
| Mean maximum °C (°F) | 16.9 (62.4) | 19.1 (66.4) | 22.2 (72.0) | 26.0 (78.8) | 29.2 (84.6) | 32.1 (89.8) | 35.3 (95.5) | 35.9 (96.6) | 33.3 (91.9) | 28.6 (83.5) | 23.9 (75.0) | 19.8 (67.6) | 36.6 (97.9) |
| Mean daily maximum °C (°F) | 11.5 (52.7) | 12.4 (54.3) | 15.4 (59.7) | 19.7 (67.5) | 23.2 (73.8) | 25.7 (78.3) | 29.6 (85.3) | 30.9 (87.6) | 27.9 (82.2) | 23.4 (74.1) | 18.8 (65.8) | 14.0 (57.2) | 21.0 (69.9) |
| Daily mean °C (°F) | 6.5 (43.7) | 7.2 (45.0) | 10.3 (50.5) | 14.7 (58.5) | 18.7 (65.7) | 21.9 (71.4) | 25.8 (78.4) | 26.8 (80.2) | 23.8 (74.8) | 18.8 (65.8) | 13.7 (56.7) | 8.8 (47.8) | 16.4 (61.5) |
| Mean daily minimum °C (°F) | 2.0 (35.6) | 2.3 (36.1) | 5.3 (41.5) | 9.9 (49.8) | 14.4 (57.9) | 18.6 (65.5) | 22.7 (72.9) | 23.5 (74.3) | 20.4 (68.7) | 14.9 (58.8) | 9.1 (48.4) | 4.2 (39.6) | 12.3 (54.1) |
| Mean minimum °C (°F) | −1.7 (28.9) | −1.9 (28.6) | −0.2 (31.6) | 3.3 (37.9) | 9.6 (49.3) | 14.3 (57.7) | 19.5 (67.1) | 20.5 (68.9) | 15.1 (59.2) | 9.0 (48.2) | 3.4 (38.1) | −0.4 (31.3) | −2.3 (27.9) |
| Record low °C (°F) | −6.9 (19.6) | −6.2 (20.8) | −5.0 (23.0) | −1.9 (28.6) | 2.8 (37.0) | 8.6 (47.5) | 13.8 (56.8) | 12.6 (54.7) | 9.4 (48.9) | 3.7 (38.7) | −1.3 (29.7) | −4.6 (23.7) | −6.9 (19.6) |
| Average precipitation mm (inches) | 106.0 (4.17) | 118.8 (4.68) | 233.8 (9.20) | 295.4 (11.63) | 360.5 (14.19) | 436.6 (17.19) | 405.2 (15.95) | 427.3 (16.82) | 745.7 (29.36) | 507.6 (19.98) | 211.5 (8.33) | 121.3 (4.78) | 3,969.6 (156.28) |
| Average snowfall cm (inches) | trace | 1 (0.4) | 0 (0) | 0 (0) | 0 (0) | 0 (0) | 0 (0) | 0 (0) | 0 (0) | 0 (0) | 0 (0) | trace | 1 (0.4) |
| Average precipitation days (≥ 1.0 mm) | 5.6 | 6.6 | 9.5 | 9.8 | 11.0 | 14.6 | 13.0 | 11.7 | 13.9 | 12.0 | 7.3 | 5.9 | 120.9 |
| Average snowy days (≥ 1 cm) | 0.1 | 0.2 | 0 | 0 | 0 | 0 | 0 | 0 | 0 | 0 | 0 | 0.1 | 0.4 |
| Average relative humidity (%) | 60 | 61 | 63 | 68 | 74 | 81 | 82 | 80 | 80 | 76 | 71 | 64 | 72 |
| Mean monthly sunshine hours | 179.8 | 170.5 | 192.9 | 191.0 | 181.7 | 124.2 | 158.6 | 178.4 | 130.5 | 136.3 | 152.6 | 174.5 | 1,965.9 |
Source: Japan Meteorological Agency

=== Demographics ===
The population of Owase has decreased steadily over the past 50 years.

Historical population
| Year | Pop. | ±% |
|---|---|---|
| 1920 | 21,672 | — |
| 1930 | 25,522 | +17.8% |
| 1940 | 25,401 | −0.5% |
| 1950 | 31,744 | +25.0% |
| 1960 | 34,534 | +8.8% |
| 1970 | 31,546 | −8.7% |
| 1980 | 31,348 | −0.6% |
| 1990 | 27,114 | −13.5% |
| 2000 | 23,683 | −12.7% |
| 2010 | 20,013 | −15.5% |

== History ==
The area of present-day Owase was part of ancient Shima Province. It was transferred to Kii Province in 1582. During this time, large-scale forestry projects were begun. After the Meiji restoration, the area became part of Mie Prefecture. The town of Owase was established in April 1889, within Kitamuro District of Mie Prefecture, with the creation of the modern municipalities system.

The city of Owase was established in June 1954, by the merger of the town of Owase with the surrounding villages of Sugari and Kuki and the villages of Kitawauchi and Minamiwauchi, both from Minamimuro District.

== Government ==
Owase has a mayor-council form of government with a directly elected mayor and a unicameral city council of 10 members. Owase, collectively with the towns of Kihoku, contributes two members to the Mie Prefectural Assembly. In terms of national politics, the city is part of Mie 4th district of the lower house of the Diet of Japan.

== Economy ==
Owase is mainly supported by its commercial fishery and forestry industries. Yellowtail, amberjack, Japanese horse mackerel, sauries, sea bream and bonito are among the fish landed at Owase. Japanese cypress and cryptomeria trees are found in abundance here in the mountains.

== Education ==
Owase has five public elementary schools and two public middle schools operated by the city government. One public high school is operated by the Mie Prefectural Department of Education. The prefecture operates one special education school for the handicapped.

== Transportation ==
=== Railway ===
JR Tōkai – Kisei Main Line

- Owase - Ōsoneura - Kuki - Mikisato - Kata

=== Highway ===
- Kisei Expressway
- National Route 42
- National Route 311
- National Route 425

=== Port ===
- Owase Port

== Festivals and events ==
- Itadaki Ichi (イタダキ市) – farmers market held the first Saturday morning of every month, featuring stalls selling Owase's local produce such as fresh seafood, dried fish, sea salt, jam etc. along with special performances by the locals.
- Ya Ya Matsuri (ヤーヤ祭り) – the largest festival in Owase, held annually on 1–5 February. In the evenings of 2-4 February, men parade around the streets, jostling each other and chanting "Ya Ya" while drinking sake before the "chosen" ones dive into the sea to purify themselves. The festival ends off with a day-long street parade on the 5th featuring dance performances and an archery contest at Owase Jinja.
- Owase Minato Matsuri (おわせ港まつり) – a summer festival held on the first Saturday in August with a fireworks display.
- Hachiman Jinja Matsuri (八幡神社例祭) – held on 15 September annually, beginning with a day-long parade culminating at the local Hachiman Jinja

== Sister cities ==
- Prince Rupert, British Columbia, Canada, since September 26, 1968
- Jinzhou District, Dalian, Liaoning, China, since July 8, 2007

== Notable people ==
- Hideo Fukuyama, professional race car driver
