= Kumanoshi Station =

Railway station in Kumano, Mie Prefecture, Japan

Kumanoshi Station 熊野市駅
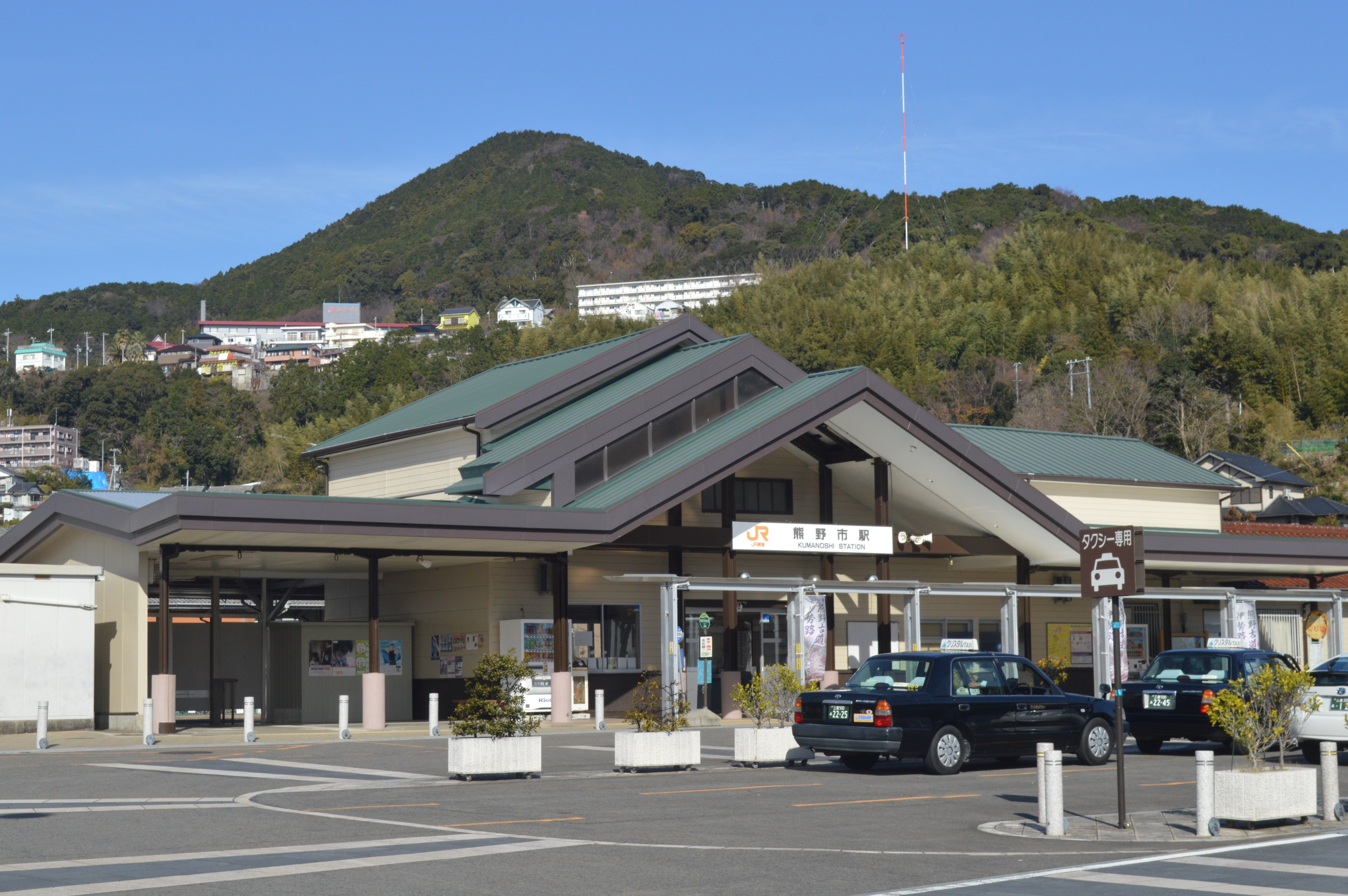
- Kumanoshi Station in January 2020

General information
- Location: 809-3 Idomachi, Kumano-shi, Mie-ken 519-4324; Japan
- Coordinates: 33.8895°N 136.0988°E
- Operator: JR Tōkai
- Line: ■ Kisei Main Line
- Distance: 157.4 km from Kameyama
- Platforms: 1 side + 1 island platform
- Tracks: 3
- Connections: Bus terminal

Construction
- Structure type: Ground level

Other information
- Status: Staffed (Midori no Madoguchi)

History
- Opened: 8 August 1940
- Former names: Kii-Kinomoto (until 15 July 1959)

Passengers
- FY2019: 465 daily

Services
Preceding station	JR Central	Following station
Koshiyama towards Shingū	Kisei Main Line Local	Odomari towards Nagoya
Shingū Terminus	Kisei Main Line Nanki	Owase towards Nagoya
Location
- Location within Mie Prefecture Location within Japan

Kumanoshi Station (熊野市駅, Kumanoshi-eki) is a passenger railway station in located in the city of Kumano, Mie Prefecture, Japan, operated by Central Japan Railway Company (JR Tōkai).

== Lines ==
Kumanoshi Station is served by the Kisei Main Line, and is located 157.4 km (97.8 mi) from the terminus of the line at Kameyama Station.

== Station layout ==
The station consists of a single-sided platform, adjacent to the main station building and serving track 1, and a two-sided island platform, reached by a pedestrian footbridge and serving tracks 2 and 3. The station has a Midori no Madoguchi staffed ticket office.

=== Platforms ===
1	■ Kisei Main Line	for Shingū and Kii-Katsuura
2	■ Kisei Main Line	for Owase and Nagoya
3	■ Kisei Main Line	for Shingū, Owase and Nagoya

== History ==
The station opened on 8 August 1940 as Kii-Kinomoto Station (紀伊木本駅) on the Japanese Government Railways (JGR) Kisei-Nishi Line. The JGR became the Japanese National Railways (JNR) after World War II, and the line was renamed the Kisei Main Line on 15 July 1959, at which time the station was renamed to Kumanoshi. The station was absorbed into the JR Central network upon the privatization of the JNR on 1 April 1987. A new station building was completed in March 1990.

== Passenger statistics ==
In fiscal 2019, the station was used by an average of 465 passengers daily (boarding passengers only).

== Surrounding area ==
- Kumano City Hall
- Kumano City Ido Elementary School
- Kumano City Kimoto Elementary School

== See also ==
- List of railway stations in Japan
