= Kuki Station (Mie) =

Railway station in Owase, Mie Prefecture, Japan

Kuki Station 九鬼駅
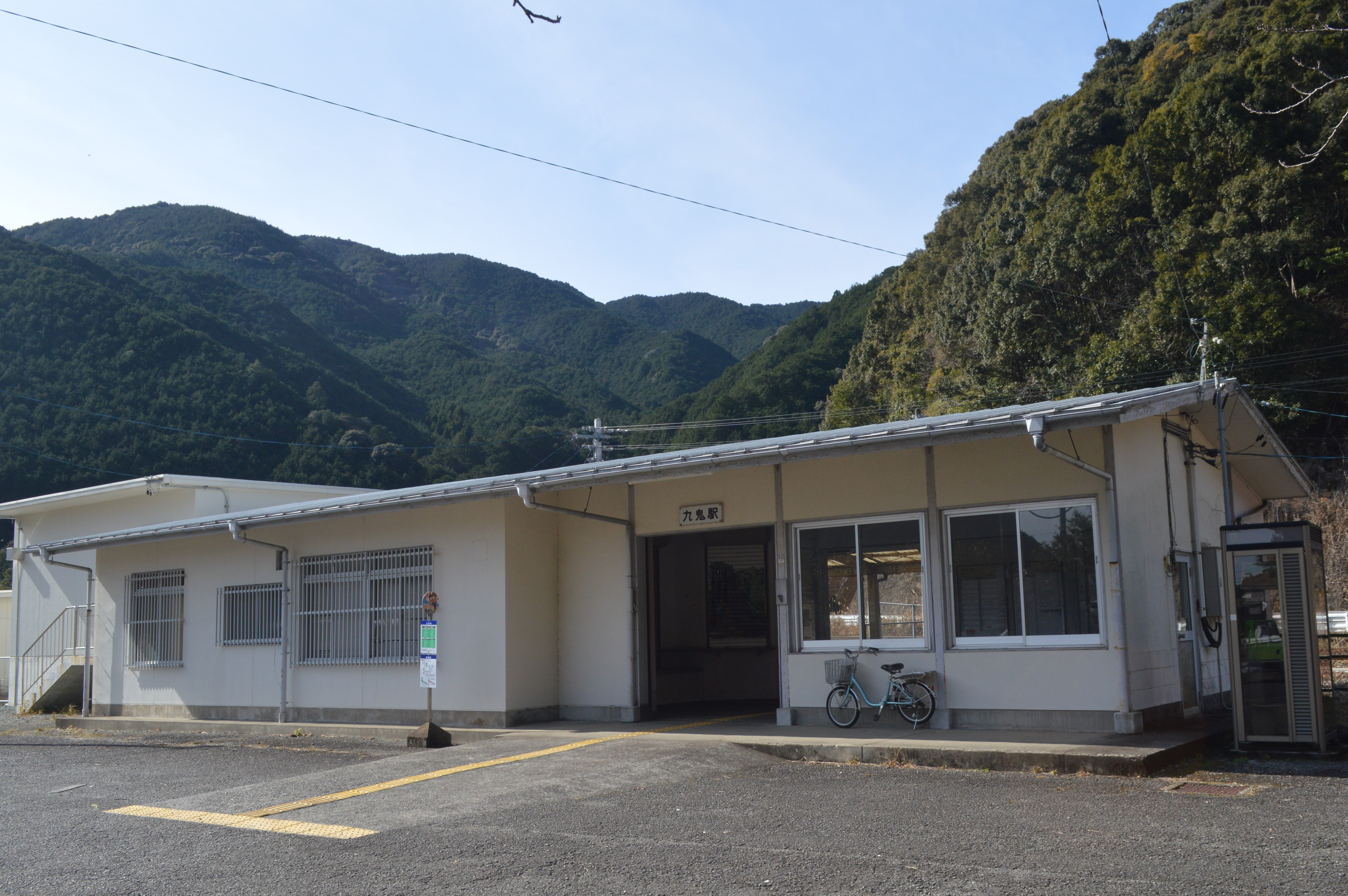
- Kuki Station

General information
- Location: 914 Kuki-cho, Owase-shi, Mie-ken 519-3701; Japan
- Coordinates: 34.0163°N 136.2428°E
- Operator: JR Tōkai
- Line: ■ Kisei Main Line
- Distance: 134.4 km from Kameyama
- Platforms: 1 island platform
- Tracks: 2
- Connections: Bus terminal

Construction
- Structure type: Ground level

Other information
- Status: Unstaffed

History
- Opened: 12 January 1957

Passengers
- FY2019: 17 daily

Services
Preceding station	JR Central	Following station
Mikisato towards Shingū	Kisei Main Line Local	Osoneura towards Nagoya
Location
- Location within Mie Prefecture Location within Japan

Kuki Station (九鬼駅, Kuki-eki) is a passenger railway station in located in the city of Owase, Mie Prefecture, Japan, operated by Central Japan Railway Company (JR Tōkai).

== Lines ==
Kuki Station is served by the Kisei Main Line, and is located 134.4 km (83.5 mi) from the terminus of the line at Kameyama Station.

== Station layout ==
The station consists of a single island platform connected to the station building by a level crossing. The small station building dates from the original construction of the line. The station is unattended.

=== Platforms ===
1	■ Kisei Main Line	for Shingū
2	■ Kisei Main Line	for Owase, and Nagoya

== History ==
Kuki Station opened on 12 January 1957 as a station on the Japan National Railways (JNR) Kisei East Line, which was renamed the Kisei Main Line on 15 July 1959. The station has been unattended since 21 December 1983. The station was absorbed into the JR Central network upon the privatization of the JNR on 1 April 1987.

== Passenger statistics ==
In fiscal 2019, the station was used by an average of 17 passengers daily (boarding passengers only).

== Surrounding area ==
- Owase City Hall Kuki Branch Office
- Kuki Post Office
- Sanshigaoka Park
- Kuki Shrine

== See also ==
- List of railway stations in Japan
