= Ariake (ferry) =

Japanese ship, launched 1995, wrecked 2009

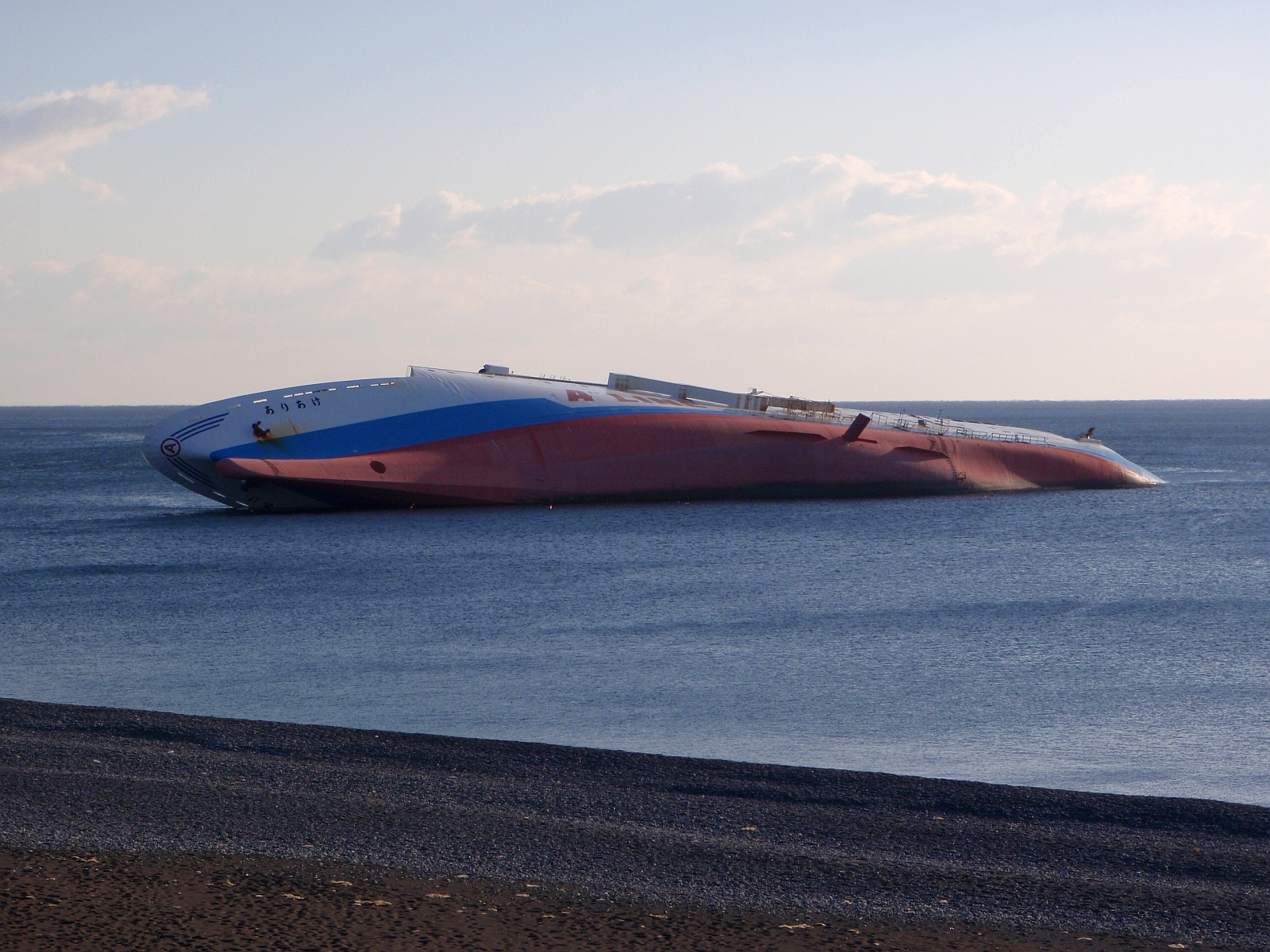

History
- Name: Ariake
- Launched: 1995
- Fate: Shipwrecked in 2009

Ariake was a ferry launched in 1995. In 2009 it was shipwrecked in Mihama, Mie Prefecture. There were some injuries but all 28 passengers and crew were rescued.
