= Hokuetsu Corporation =

Japanese paper milling company

- Native name: 北越コーポレーション株式会社
- Company type: Public KK
- Traded as: TYO: 3865
- ISIN: JP3841800000
- Industry: Pulp and paper
- Founded: April 27, 1907; 119 years ago
- Headquarters: Chuo-ku, Tokyo 103-0021, Japan
- Area served: Worldwide
- Key people: Sekio Kishimoto (President and CEO)
- Products: Paper and pulp products; Paper and liquid containers; Timber
- Revenue: ▲JPY 269 billion (FY 2017) (US$ 2.5 billion) (FY 2017)
- Net income: ▼JPY 10.3 billion (FY 2017) (US$ 97 million) (FY 2017)
- Number of employees: 4,270 (consolidated, as of March 31, 2022)
- Website: Official website

Hokuetsu Corporation (北越コーポレーション株式会社, Hokuetsu Kōporēshon Kabushiki-gaisha) is a Japanese paper milling company. It was established in 1907.
