= Owase Station =

Railway station in Owase, Mie Prefecture, Japan

Owase Station 尾鷲駅
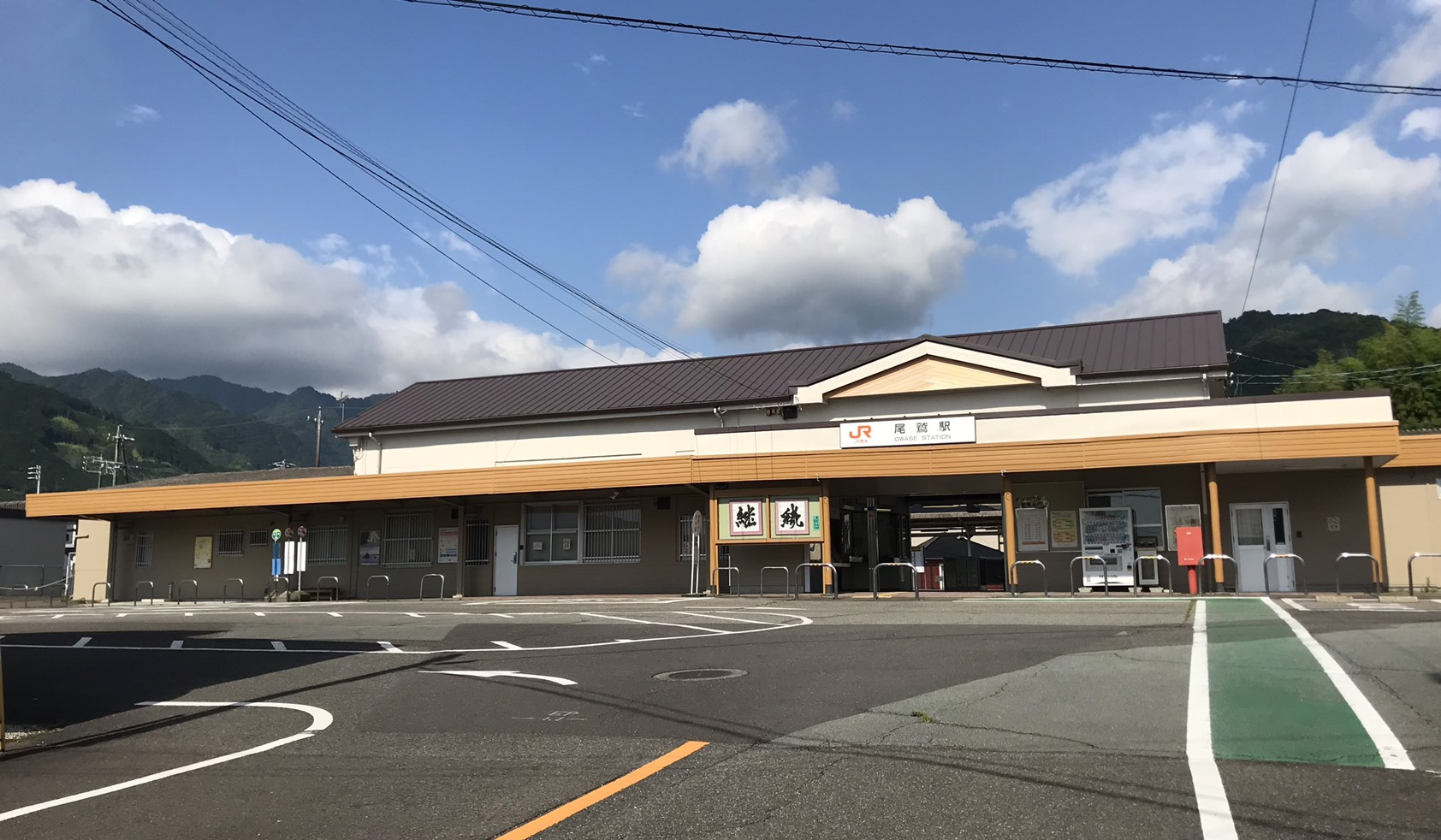
- Owase Station

General information
- Location: 760 Nakamura-cho, Owase-shi, Mie-ken 519-3616; Japan
- Coordinates: 34.0744°N 136.1903°E
- Operator: JR Tōkai
- Line: ■ Kisei Main Line
- Distance: 123.3 km from Kameyama
- Platforms: 2 side platforms
- Tracks: 2
- Connections: Bus terminal

Construction
- Structure type: Ground level

Other information
- Status: Staffed (Midori no Madoguchi)

History
- Opened: 19 December 1934
- Former names: Owashi (to 1959)

Passengers
- FY2019: 379 daily

Services
Preceding station	JR Central	Following station
Osoneura towards Shingū	Kisei Main Line Local	Aiga towards Nagoya
Kumanoshi towards Shingū	Kisei Main Line Nanki	Kii-Nagashima towards Nagoya
Location
- Location within Mie Prefecture Location within Japan

Owase Station (尾鷲駅, Owase-eki) is a passenger railway station in located in the city of Owase, Mie Prefecture, Japan, operated by Central Japan Railway Company (JR Tōkai).

== Lines ==
Owase Station is served by the Kisei Main Line, and is located 123.3 km (76.6 mi) from the terminus of the line at Kameyama Station.

== Station layout ==
Owase Station consists of two opposed side platforms connected to the station building by a footbridge. The station has a Midori no Madoguchi staffed ticket office.

=== Platforms ===
1	■ Kisei Main Line	for Shingū; For Matsusaka, and Nagoya
2	■ Kisei Main Line	for Matsusaka, and Nagoya

== History ==
Owase Station opened on 19 December 1934 as Owashi Station (尾鷲駅, Owashi eki) on the Japanese Government Railways (JGR) Kisei East Line. The JGR became the Japan National Railways (JNR) after World War II, and the line was extended to Kuki Station by 12 January 1957. The line was renamed the Kisei Main Line on 15 July 1959, at which time the name of the station assumed its present spelling. The station was absorbed into the JR Central network upon the privatization of the JNR on 1 April 1987.

== Passenger statistics ==
In fiscal 2019, the station was used by an average of 379 passengers daily (boarding passengers only).

== Surrounding area ==
- Nakamurayama Castle
- Owase City Hall

== See also ==
- List of railway stations in Japan
