= Typhoon Gilda (1974) =

Pacific typhoon in 1974

Typhoon Gilda (Deling)
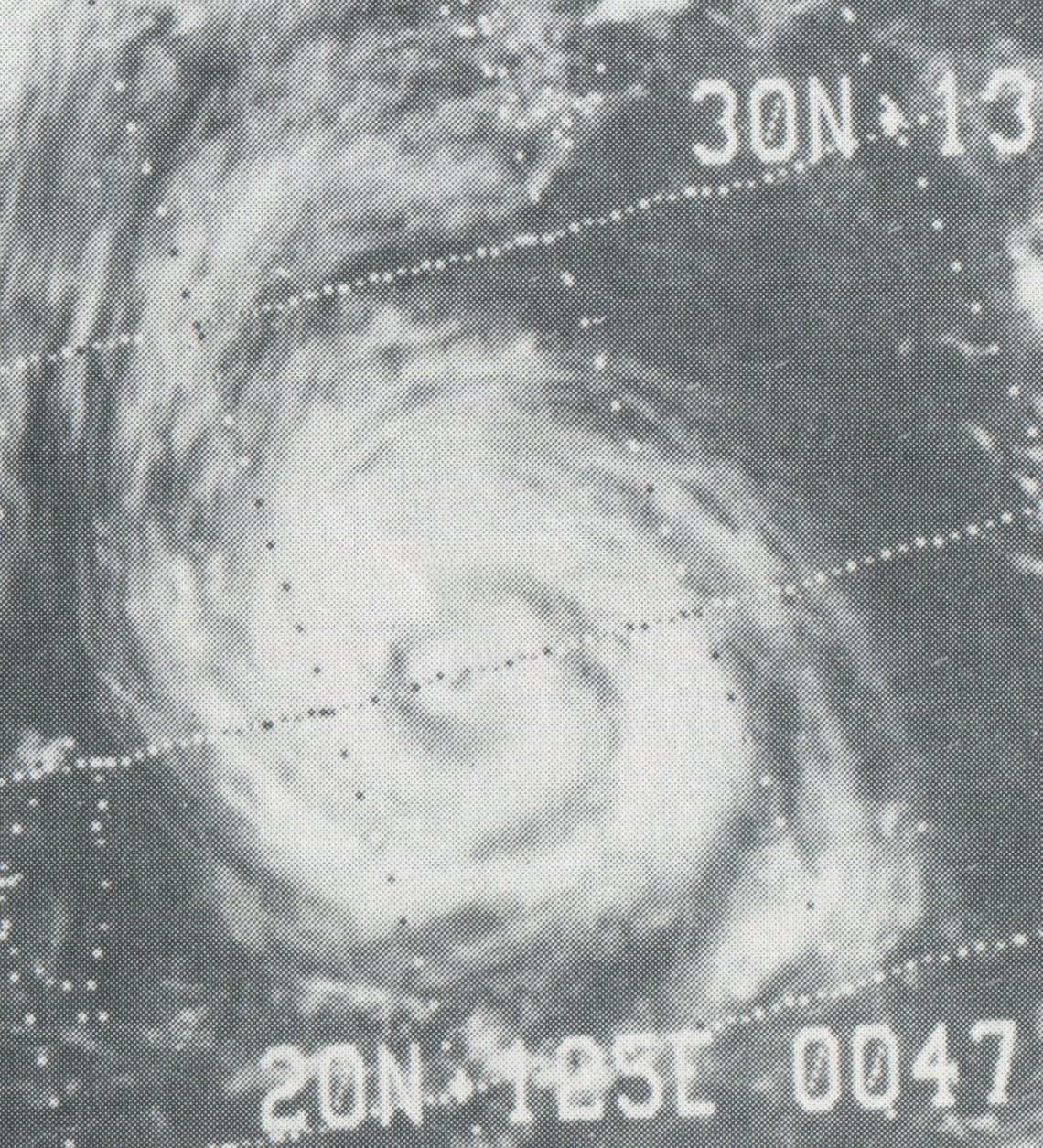
- Typhoon Gilda on July 4

Meteorological history
- Formed: June 29, 1974
- Extratropical: July 9, 1974
- Dissipated: July 17, 1974

Unknown-strength storm
- 10-minute sustained (JMA)
- Lowest pressure: 945 hPa (mbar); 27.91 inHg

Category 2-equivalent typhoon
- 1-minute sustained (SSHWS/JTWC)
- Highest winds: 165 km/h (105 mph)
- Lowest pressure: 944 hPa (mbar); 27.88 inHg

Overall effects
- Fatalities: 145 total
- Missing: 1
- Damage: $1.5 billion (1974 USD)
- Areas affected: Northern Mariana Islands, Nansei Islands, South Korea, Kuril Islands, Sakhalin, Soviet Far East
- IBTrACS
- Part of the 1974 Pacific typhoon season

Typhoon Gilda, known in the Philippines as Typhoon Deling was a destructive, deadly, and long-lived tropical cyclone that left over 145 confirmed deaths over Japan and South Korea, mostly due to torrential rainfall that induced landslides, all generated by the typhoon and its associated meiyu front. The eighth named storm and third typhoon of the 1974 Pacific typhoon season, the system was first noted by the China Meteorological Agency as an area of convection embedded on a trough, to the north of Enewetak Atoll on June 25. It was named Gilda on June 30 as it strengthened to a tropical storm. Under a favorable environment, it strengthened to a typhoon two days later as it moved northwestward. Another trough pulled Gilda poleward while changing less in intensity, until it intensified to a Category 2 typhoon as it battered the Ryukyu Islands at its peak. Increasing wind shear gradually weakened the system; however, it remained as a minimal typhoon until it passed through the southern tip of South Korea on July 6, where it weakened to a tropical storm. Colder waters in the Sea of Japan and high shear further degraded Gilda, until it transitioned to an extratropical low as it made landfall near Hokkaido on July 9. The remnants of the system briefly intensified near the Kuril Islands before weakening and dissipating on July 17 over the Sea of Okhotsk.

Gilda was responsible for over 145 fatalities and a missing person as it affected South Korea and the Japanese archipelago, including the Nansei Islands. Widespread flooding and landslides also occurred, which was more worsened by an active frontal system over Shanghai. The total damages from the system were at $1.5 billion (1974 USD).

== Meteorological history ==
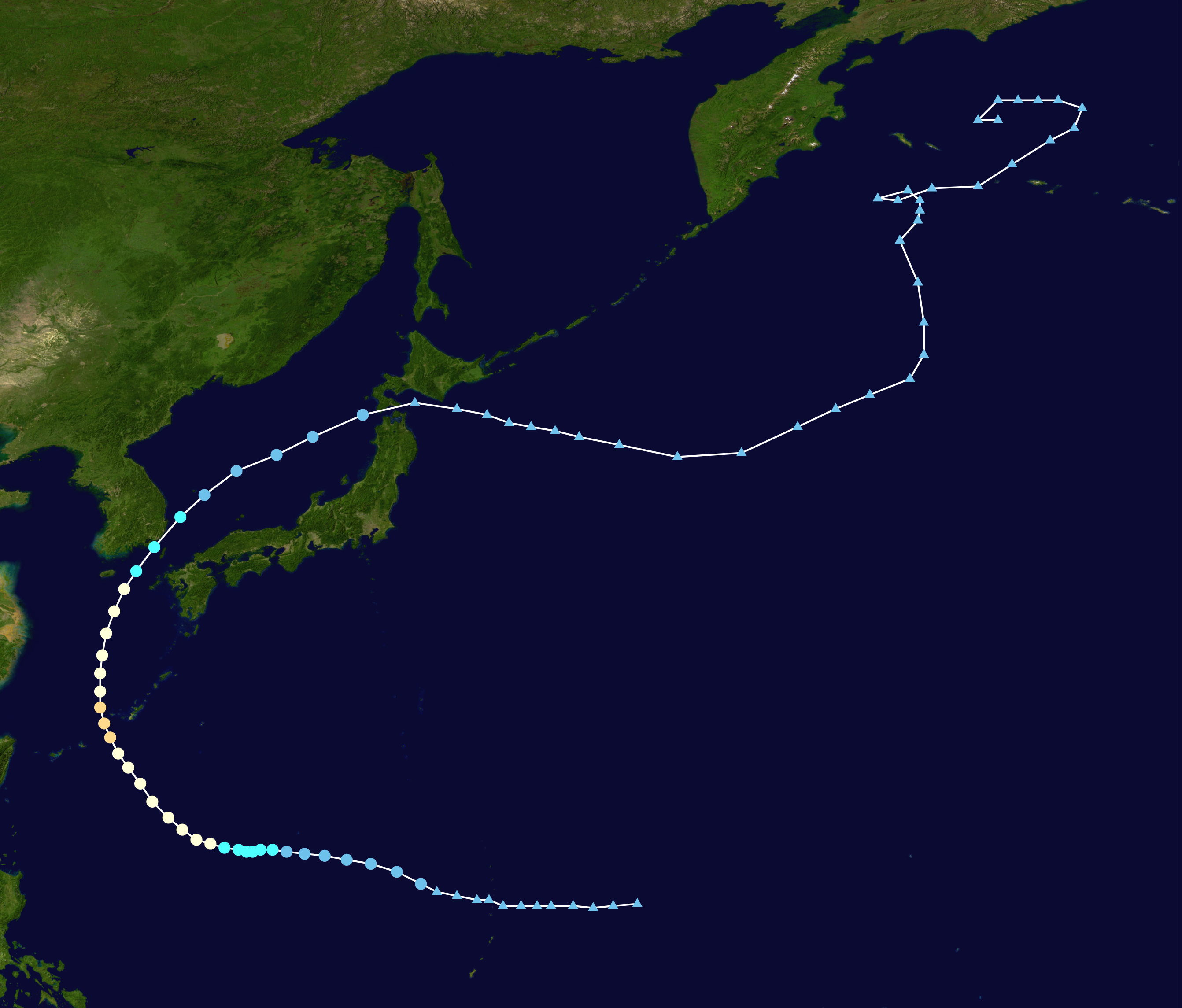
Map plotting the storm's track and intensity, according to the Saffir–Simpson scale Map key Saffir–Simpson scale Tropical depression (≤38 mph, ≤62 km/h) Tropical storm (39–73 mph, 63–118 km/h) Category 1 (74–95 mph, 119–153 km/h) Category 2 (96–110 mph, 154–177 km/h) Category 3 (111–129 mph, 178–208 km/h) Category 4 (130–156 mph, 209–251 km/h) Category 5 (≥157 mph, ≥252 km/h) Unknown Storm type Tropical cyclone Subtropical cyclone Extratropical cyclone, remnant low, tropical disturbance, or monsoon depression

An area of convection on a surface trough which extended until Midway Atoll was first monitored by the China Meteorological Agency on June 25, approximately 400 km to the north of Enewetak Atoll. The Japan Meteorological Agency (JMA) also started to monitor the system at this time, analysing it with a pressure of 1006 mBar in their first bulletin. The disturbance moved to the west without further development, based on satellite imagery. On June 29, the system became better defined on satellite coverages, with the Joint Typhoon Warning Center (JTWC) issuing their first bulletin on the system at 00:00 UTC that day. Based on a ship that reported gale-force winds near its center, the JTWC upgraded the system to a tropical storm at this time, with the agency naming it Gilda. The JMA, at that time, analysed the barometric pressure of the system to be 990 mBar. Gilda then began to curve northwards, as a mid-atmospheric trough began to be dominant over East China. At 06:00 UTC of July 2, the system intensified to a typhoon, with its barometric pressure analyzed by the JMA to be 965 mBar. Early the next day, a Japanese vessel named Shinkyoyu Maru passed near the typhoon, recording a pressure of 988 mBar and winds of over 45 knots. Gilda slowly intensified despite a favorable environment and while passing through the Ryukyu Islands, it strengthened to a Category 2 typhoon on July 4 and reached its peak intensity shortly, with one-minute sustained winds of 165 km/h (105 mph) and a barometric pressure of 945 mBar, equivalent to a mid-level typhoon. On the same day, a reconnaissance aircraft passed through its eye, measuring a minimum pressure of 944 mBar. Shortly after peaking, the typhoon slowly weakened to a Category 1 due to increasing wind shear and unfavorable sea surface temperatures on the next day. A mid-atmospheric subtropical ridge curved the system to the north-northeast and while nearing South Korea, Gilda weakened to a tropical storm and accelerated, due to an upper-level southwesterly flow over Manchuria. As it entered the Sea of Japan, the disorganized Gilda started to become extratropical while weakening to a tropical depression on July 7. In post-tropical analysis, Gilda remained a tropical depression as it made landfall through Hokkaido on the next day before becoming fully extratropical as it moved offshore in the Pacific Ocean on July 9. The extratropical remnants of Gilda briefly strengthened while nearing the Kuril Islands and it started to undergo a loop before entering the Sea of Okhotsk. There, it weakened below gale-force and dissipated on July 17, ending its long journey.

== Impact ==
Records compiled by the Japan Meteorological Agency shows that Gilda killed 145 individuals throughout its journey and the images it caused were estimated at $1.02 billion (1974 USD).

=== South Korea ===
As Gilda grazed the southern coast of South Korea, eight individuals were reported dead by the authorities and another six persons are reported missing for unknown reasons. There were reports of flooding and landslides throughout the southern portion of the country; however, the total damages and fatalities were unknown.

=== Japan ===
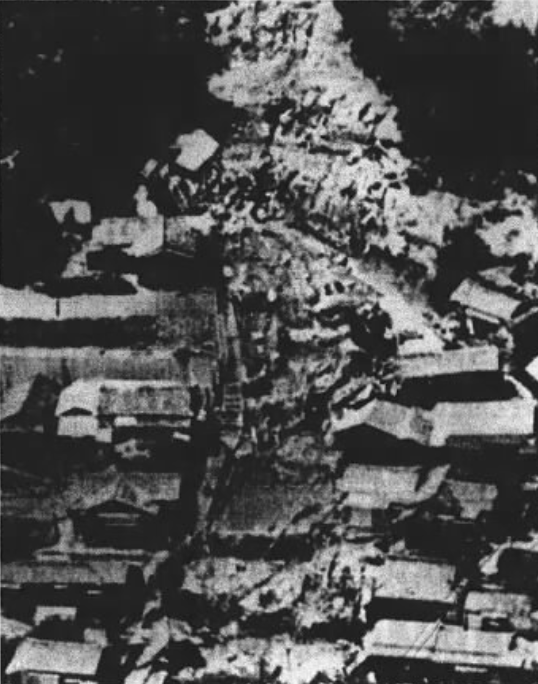
Villages were buried in mud due to a landslide in Shōdoshima Island.

Gilda, despite affecting the country as a weak system, caused a catastrophic effect in its different prefectures and islands. Due to limited coverage about the whereabouts of the typhoon, the exact numbers of deaths were unknown, but it is estimated that Gilda killed 138 individuals in that country. In the history of Japan, the system was regarded as the eighth typhoon to cause large inundation damages. The impacts of the storm were separated by prefectures as follows:

==== Kagawa Prefecture ====
On Shōdoshima Island in Kagawa Prefecture, it had been raining since July 4, but the baiu front brought torrential rains on July 6 and 7, triggering numerous landslides. In Iwagaya, Uchinomi-cho and Shozu-gun, a maximum of 90 mm of rainfall in a day, 396 mm of daily rainfall, and a continuous rainfall of 406 mm were reported. An unknown number were killed, 24 people were seriously injured, 216 homes were partially destroyed, and 47 houses were completely destroyed, as per reports. Furthermore, several homes in the Tosan region were flooded, resulting in the greatest flood damage in the history of the prefecture.

==== Okayama Prefecture ====
In the prefecture, reports defines that a house was washed away and 530 more were flooded, all in Bizen City.

==== Hyogo Prefecture ====
Similar to Kagawa Prefecture, it has been raining on Awaji Island in Hyogo Prefecture since July 4, and a heavy rain warning was issued at 9:40 pm, two days later. Rainfall began around 9 a.m. the next day in Ako City and heavy rain started to pour two hours later, with a maximum hourly rainfall of 56 mm, a daily rainfall of 312 mm, and a continuous rainfall of 313 mm. As a result of the heavy rain, all rivers in the city were flooded and collapsed, causing flooding throughout the city.

The rainfall amounts of 190 mm and daily rainfalls of 300 mm were recorded by the Tsuna district and Ichinomiya-cho of Awaji Island. The torrential rain on the island caused flash floods and landslides, killing 14 people and injuring 13 others. Furthermore, in southwest Kakogawa and Himeji, there were over 1,322 units flooded due to the typhoon.

==== Wakayama Prefecture ====
In the city of Tanabe, 100 mm of precipitation and 442 mm total rainfall were recorded from 5:00 am to 6:00 am on July 7, causing damages to eight houses.

==== Mie Prefecture ====
It had been raining in Mie Prefecture since June 29, but it began to pour heavily on July 6 as the typhoon approached. The rainfall on that day and 7th were 300-500mm in the southern part of the prefecture, 150-280mm in the north-central part, and 850mm or more in the Odaigayama system, which is known for its heavy rainfall. The warning water level was exceeded at 16:00 on that day in the lower reaches of Miyagawa, which receives its water from the Odaigayama system. The villages of Misono and Watarai were threatened by an embankment collapse; however, some residents of Tako helped to avoid it by placing over 500 sandbags in the embankment.

From around 13:00 on the 7th, heavy rain flooded the Seta River, which flowed through Ise City. Over 3,051 hectares of households were flooded in the majority and in Misono Village of the city, over 2 people died, a house was destroyed and over 3,000 of them were flooded. These floods were all due to the Tokitagawa basin that overflowed due to heavy rains.

The Seta River was designated as a first-class river as the Miyagawa river system in 1975 (Showa 50) in order to be maintained by the national budget. It widened the middle basin and in 1978, the Seta River tide gate became equipped with a drainage pump station to control the overflowing of the river.

==== Aichi Prefecture ====
In the prefecture, Chita Peninsula and the eastern portion of Mikawa caused some widespread inundation damages due to the Yadagawa and Toyo River, which overflowed that day. In the western half of the Owari Province, 4 fatalities were reported and over 9,267 households affected by flooding. Eight railway lines also suffered damages. Another river overflowed, submerging over 2,196 houses and 5,900 buildings and establishments. The Mito River's left embankment was destroyed by strong currents, flooding wards, and establishments near the area.

In Toyohashi, the rainfall amount recorded in the area was estimated to be 3,025mm, in total. The city recorded a fatality, destroyed two houses, and leftover 5,000 households flooded.

==== Shizuoka Prefecture ====
In the prefecture, the rains started to impact the area on June 27, and rainfall of 100 mm was recorded from July 4–5. In the western part, the rains started to pour in the early morning of July 7, and began stronger at that time. In Araimachi (now merged into Kosai City), there were reports of house and embankment damages. In the towns of Hosoe-cho and Inasa-gun (now Hamana-ku), still in the prefecture, the authorities recorded a fatality, five injuries, 57 affected households, and 681 flooded wards. In Tenryū City (now Tenryū Ward) in Hamamatsu reported two fatalities, six injuries, 22 houses affected, and nearly 3,000 households were flooded. The city, as a whole, recorded five deaths, two injuries, 32 affected houses, and exactly 1,500 households flooded.

In Iwata, its river that flows through the Tenryu River system recorded a rainfall amount of 270 mm, which flooded 647 households, and in Otagawa River basin, a levee was smashed by strong current from the river, causing flash floods that destroyed 87 houses and another 2,240 to be flooded. The local authorities also reported flooding in Mori-cho and Shuchi-gun, which caused a fatality, five serious injuries and over 723 households to be submerged. In Fujieda City, three houses were destroyed, 4 were partially washed out, and another 1,424 to be flooded. Yaizu City reported 2,045 households flooded and/or washed out; however, there were no fatalities.

In its city, the authorities at a meteorological center recorded a rainfall amount of 508 mm, an unusually high amount in its record. In addition, the Abe River overflowed, destroying 39 houses in its path and flooding 8,171 more. The Tomoegawa river also overflowed, killing 23 people and injured 28 more. Over 22,551 households were also flooded as a result. The town of Shimizu reported four deaths, three destroyed houses, and over 50,283 flooded households. In Fuji City, the authorities there reported a fatality and over 3,464 houses were flooded. The Kano River in Numazu broke its embankment, submerging over 681 households that killed a person. A rainfall accumulation of 73 mm were reported in a week in the city of Mishima, destroying eight houses and flooded 1,416 more.

Regarding transportations, some major highways and expressways like Japan National Route 1 and Tōmei Expressway, and railway lines such as the Tōkaidō Main Line, Tokaido Shinkansen were disrupted due to major floodings and sometimes, landslides that made motorist stranded. The Yui Station, a railway station recorded 376 mm of rainfall amount. The Tokaido Main Line by the Central Japan Railway Company suffered major damage, halting railway operations in that place for a week.

==== Kanagawa Prefecture ====
The Sagami River in Kanagawa Prefecture flooded over 272 houses in Hiratsuka. Yokosuka, a naval base, recorded a rainfall amount of more than 250 mm in eight days. In all parts of the city, multiple portions of cliffs broke and fell down the road and streets, killing 13 in a family and another 4 to be feared dead, as they were trapped in a house. The second-largest city of the prefecture, Yokohama, recorded a rainfall accumulation of 43 mm. This was enough for the Tsurumi River to overflow, submerging over 1,110 in floodwaters.

==== Tokyo Metropolis ====
The Tsurumi River overflowed, first submerging homes in Kanagawa Prefecture before reaching Tokyo, flooding an unknown number of houses. In addition, the Meguro River and Tama River also reached over their limit capacity, flooding over 859 households in different towns and wards. It was unknown if there were deaths and further damages attributed to the system.

== See also ==
- Typhoon Rita (1975) - a typhoon that hit Japan during August 1975.
- Typhoon Phyllis (1975) - a typhoon that also caused heavy destruction due to landslides in the country.
- Typhoon June (1975) - a super typhoon that threatened Japan but passed safely to the northeast; the second strongest tropical cyclone worldwide just before Tip in 1979.
