= Sana Station =

Railway station in Taki, Mie Prefecture, Japan

Sana Station 佐奈駅
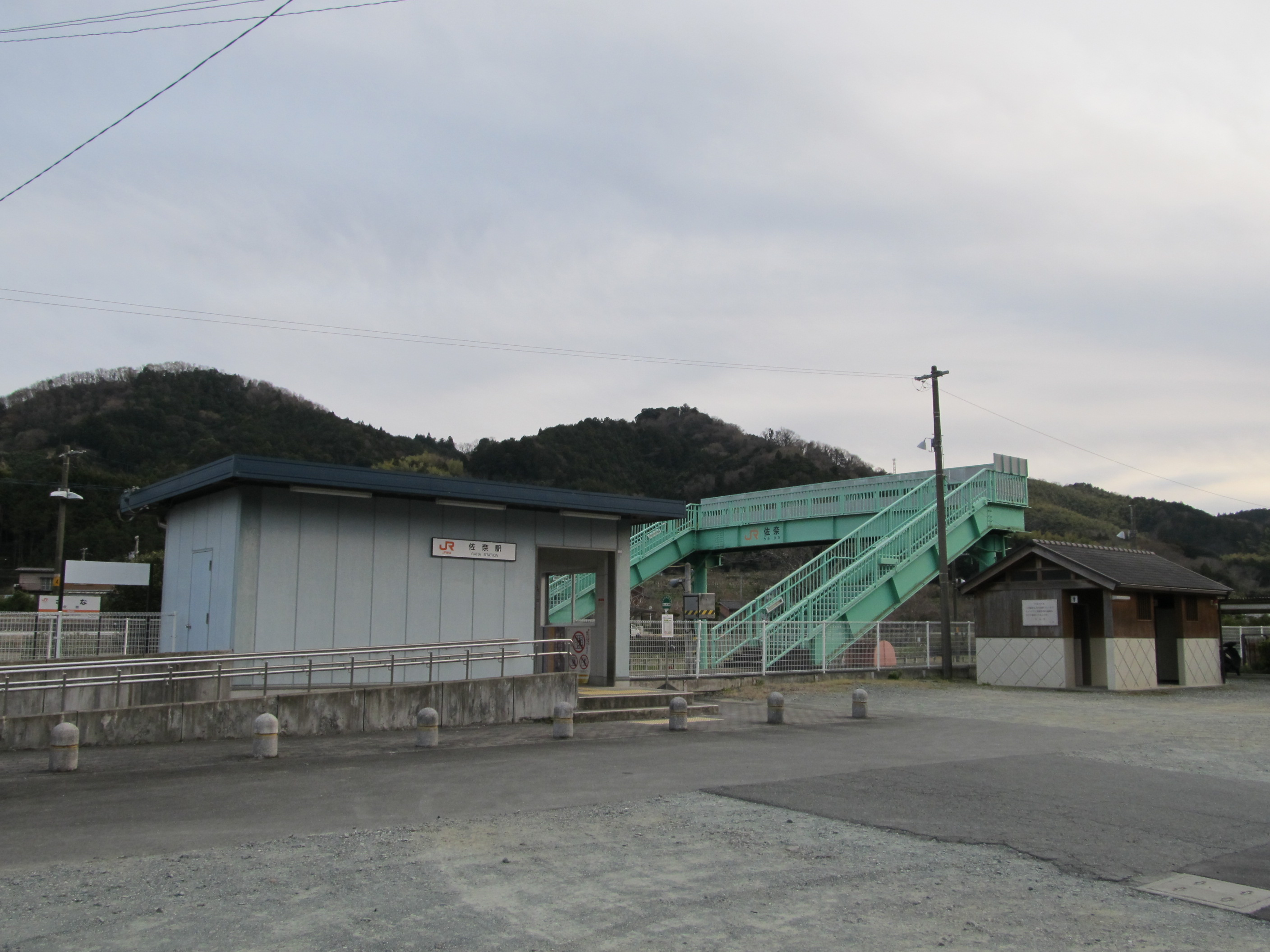
- Sana Station

General information
- Location: 986 Hiradani, Taki-cho, Tak-gun, Mie-ken 519-2178; Japan
- Coordinates: 34.4780°N 136.5392°E
- Operator: JR Tōkai
- Line: ■ Kisei Main Line
- Distance: 49.6 km from Kameyama
- Platforms: 2 side platforms
- Tracks: 2
- Connections: Bus terminal

Construction
- Structure type: Ground level

Other information
- Status: Unstaffed

History
- Opened: 20 March 1923

Passengers
- FY2019: 39 daily

Services
Preceding station	JR Central	Following station
Tochihara towards Shingū	Kisei Main Line Local	Ōka towards Nagoya
Location
- Location within Mie Prefecture Location within Japan

Sana Station (佐奈駅, Sana-eki) is a passenger railway station located in the town of Taki, Taki District, Mie Prefecture, Japan, operated by Central Japan Railway Company (JR Tōkai).

== Lines ==
Sana Station is served by the Kisei Main Line, and is located 49.6 rail kilometers from the terminus of the line at Kameyama Station.

== Station layout ==
The station consists of two opposed side platforms, connected by a footbridge. There is no station building. The station is unattended.

=== Platforms ===
1	■ Kisei Main Line	For Taki, Kameyama, Yokkaichi, Nagoya
2	■ Kisei Main Line	For Owase, Shingū, Kii-Katsuura

== History ==
Sana Station opened on 20 March 1923 as a station on the Japanese Government Railways (JGR) Kisei-East Line. The line was extended on to Kawazoe Station on 20 November 1923. The JGR became the Japan National Railways (JNR) after World War II, and the line was renamed the Kisei Main Line on 15 July 1959. The station has been unattended since 21 December 1983. The station was absorbed into the JR Central network upon the privatization of the JNR on 1 April 1987. The station building was torn down in February 2000.

== Passenger statistics ==
In fiscal 2019, the station was used by an average of 39 passengers daily (boarding passengers only).

== Surrounding area ==
- Enko-en
- Ise Expressway Seiwa-Taki IC
- Wakayama Betsu Kaido
- Gokatsura Pond Furusato Village

== See also ==
- List of railway stations in Japan
