= Ōka Station =

Railway station in Taki, Mie Prefecture, Japan

Ōka Station 相可駅
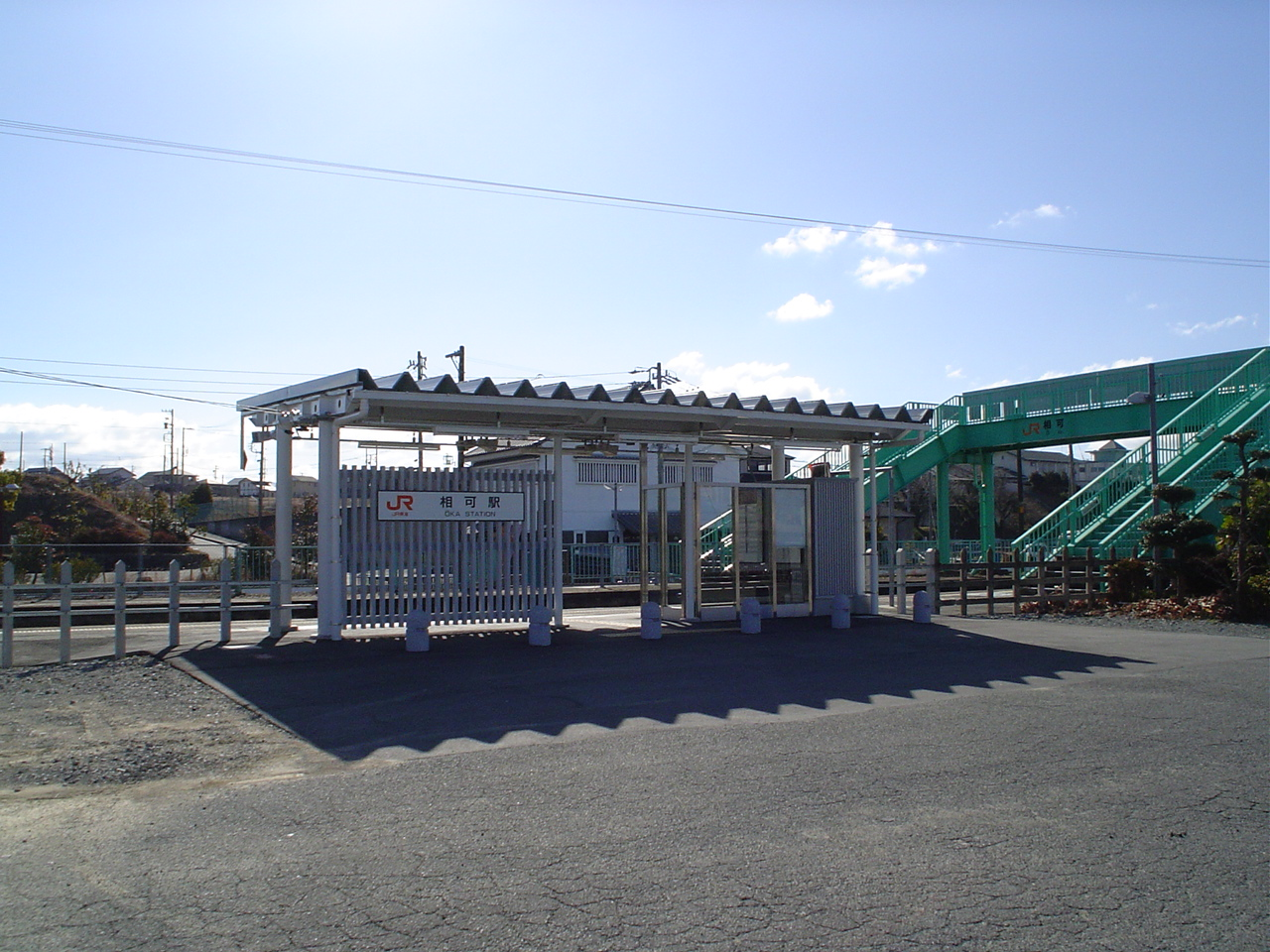
- Ōka Station

General information
- Location: 1146 Ōka, Taki-cho, Taki-gun, Mie-ken 519-2181; Japan
- Coordinates: 34.5029°N 136.5455°E
- Operator: JR Tōkai
- Line: ■ Kisei Main Line
- Distance: 46.4 km from Kameyama
- Platforms: 2 side platforms
- Tracks: 2
- Connections: Bus terminal

Construction
- Structure type: Ground level

Other information
- Status: Unstaffed

History
- Opened: 20 March 1923

Passengers
- FY2019: 233 daily

Services
Preceding station	JR Central	Following station
Sana towards Shingū	Kisei Main Line Local	Taki towards Nagoya
Location
- Location within Mie Prefecture Location within Japan

Ōka Station (相可駅, Ōka-eki) is a passenger railway station in located in the town of Taki, Taki District, Mie Prefecture, Japan, operated by Central Japan Railway Company (JR Tōkai).

== Lines ==
Ōka Station is served by the Kisei Main Line, and is located 46.4 km (28.8 mi) from the terminus of the line at Kameyama Station.

== Station layout ==
The station was originally built with a single side platform serving bidirectional traffic; however it was converted to two opposed side platforms connected by a footbridge. There is no station building. The station is unattended.

=== Platforms ===
1	■ Kisei Main Line	For Taki, Kameyama, Yokkaichi and Nagoya
2	■ Kisei Main Line	For Owase, Shingū and Kii-Katsuura

== History ==
Ōka Station opened on 20 March 1923, as a station on the Japanese Government Railways (JGR) Kisei-East Line. The line was extended on to Kawazoe Station on 20 November 1923. The JGR became the Japan National Railways (JNR) after World War II, and the line was renamed the Kisei Main Line on 15 July 1959. The station has been unattended since 21 December 1983. The station was absorbed into the JR Central network upon the privatization of the JNR on 1 April 1987.

== Passenger statistics ==
In fiscal 2019, the station was used by an average of 233 passengers daily (boarding passengers only).

== Surrounding area ==
- Ōka Jinja
- Taki Town Hall
- Taki Town Matsusaka City School Association Taki Junior High School
- Taki Industrial Park
- Sharp Taki Factory
- Mie Prefectural Oka High School

== See also ==
- List of railway stations in Japan
