= Tochihara Station =

Railway station in Ōdai, Mie Prefecture, Japan

Tochihara Station 栃原駅
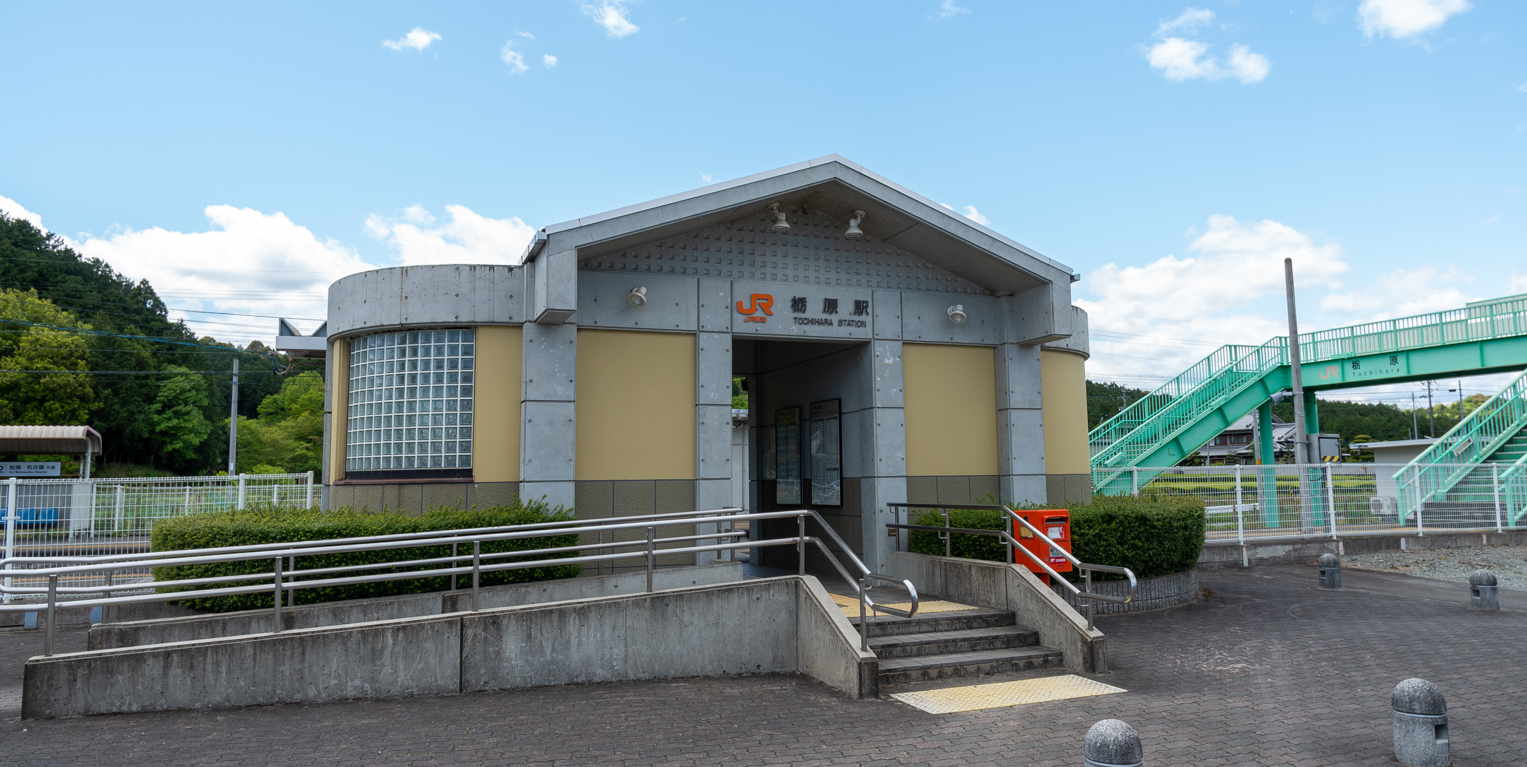
- Tochihara Station, May 2013

General information
- Location: 1247 Tochihara, Ōdai-machi, Taki-gun, Mie-ken 519-2424; Japan
- Coordinates: 34.4444°N 136.5096°E
- Operator: JR Tōkai
- Line: ■ Kisei Main Line
- Distance: 55.1 km from Kameyama
- Platforms: 2 side platforms
- Tracks: 2
- Connections: Bus terminal

Construction
- Structure type: Ground level

Other information
- Status: Unstaffed

History
- Opened: 20 March 1923

Passengers
- FY2019: 117 daily

Services
Preceding station	JR Central	Following station
Kawazoe towards Shingū	Kisei Main Line Local	Sana towards Nagoya
Location
- Location within Mie Prefecture Location within Japan

Tochihara Station (栃原駅, Tochihara-eki) is a passenger railway station in located in the town of Ōdai, Taki District, Mie Prefecture, Japan, operated by Central Japan Railway Company (JR Tōkai).

== Lines ==
Tochihara Station is served by the Kisei Main Line, and is located 55.1 km (34.2 mi) from the terminus of the line at Kameyama Station.

== Station layout ==
The station consists of two opposed side platforms, connected by a footbridge. The station is unattended.

=== Platforms ===
1	■ Kisei Main Line	For Owase, Shingū, Kii-Katsuura
2	■ Kisei Main Line	For Taki, Kameyama, Yokkaichi, Nagoya

== History ==
Tochihara Station opened on 20 March 1923, as a station on the Japanese Government Railways (JGR) Kisei-East Line. The line was extended on to Kawazoe Station on 20 November 1923. The JGR became the Japan National Railways (JNR) after World War II, and the line was renamed the Kisei Main Line on 15 July 1959. The station has been unattended since 21 December 1983. The station was absorbed into the JR Central network upon the privatization of the JNR on 1 April 1987. The station building was reconstructed in February 2000.

== Passenger statistics ==
In fiscal 2019, the station was used by an average of 117 passengers daily (boarding passengers only).

== Surrounding area ==
- Kawazoe Shrine
- Japan National Route 42
- Odai Municipal Nissin Elementary School

== See also ==
- List of railway stations in Japan
