= Seiwa =

Seiwa can refer to:

- Emperor Seiwa, emperor of Japan
- Seiwa, Mie, a district in Mie, Japan
- Seiwa, Kumamoto, a village located in Kumamoto Prefecture, Japan
- Seiwa College, in Nishinomiya, Hyōgo, Japan
- Seiwa University, in Kisarazu, Chiba, Japan
