= Takihara Station =

Railway station in Ōdai, Mie Prefecture, Japan

Takihara Station 滝原駅
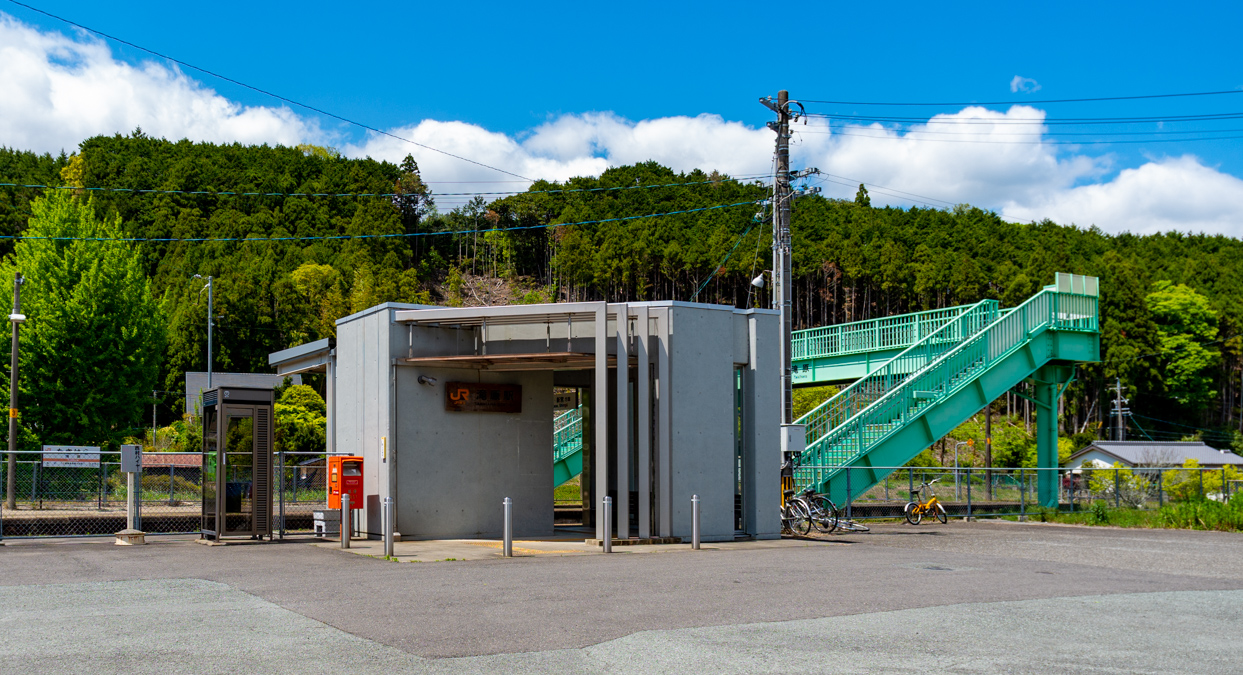
- Takihara Station. May 2013

General information
- Location: 155 Ogasho, Ōdai-machi, Taki-gun, Mie-ken 519-2413; Japan
- Coordinates: 34.3606°N 136.4121°E
- Operator: JR Tōkai
- Line: ■ Kisei Main Line
- Distance: 73.0 km from Kameyama
- Platforms: 2 side platforms
- Connections: Bus terminal

Construction
- Structure type: Ground level

Other information
- Status: Unstaffed

History
- Opened: 18 August 1926

Passengers
- FY2019: 37 daily

Services
Preceding station	JR Central	Following station
Aso towards Shingū	Kisei Main Line Local	Misedani towards Nagoya
Location
- Location within Mie Prefecture Location within Japan

Takihara Station (滝原駅, Takihara-eki) is a passenger railway station in located in the town of Ōdai, Taki District, Mie Prefecture, Japan, operated by Central Japan Railway Company (JR Tōkai).

== Lines ==
Takihara Station is served by the Kisei Main Line, and is located 73.0 rail kilometers from the terminus of the line at Kameyama Station.

== Station layout ==
The station consists of two opposed side platforms, connected by a footbridge. The station is unattended.

=== Platforms ===
1	■ Kisei Main Line	For Owase, Shingū
2	■ Kisei Main Line	For Matsusaka, Nagoya

== History ==
Takihara Station opened on 18 August 1926 as a station on the Japanese Government Railways (JGR) Kisei-East Line. The line was extended on to Ise-Kashiwazaki Station on 3 July 1927. The JGR became the Japan National Railways (JNR) after World War II, and the line was renamed the Kisei Main Line on 15 July 1959. The station has been unattended since 21 December 1983. The station was absorbed into the JR Central network upon the privatization of the JNR on 1 April 1987.

== Passenger statistics ==
In fiscal 2019, the station was used by an average of 37 passengers daily (boarding passengers only).

== Surrounding area ==
- Taiki Town Hall
- Takiharanomiya-Ise Jingu Bekkyu.
- Kumano Kodo Iseji

== See also ==
- List of railway stations in Japan
