= Misedani Station =

Railway station in Ōdai, Mie Prefecture, Japan

Misedani Station 三瀬谷駅
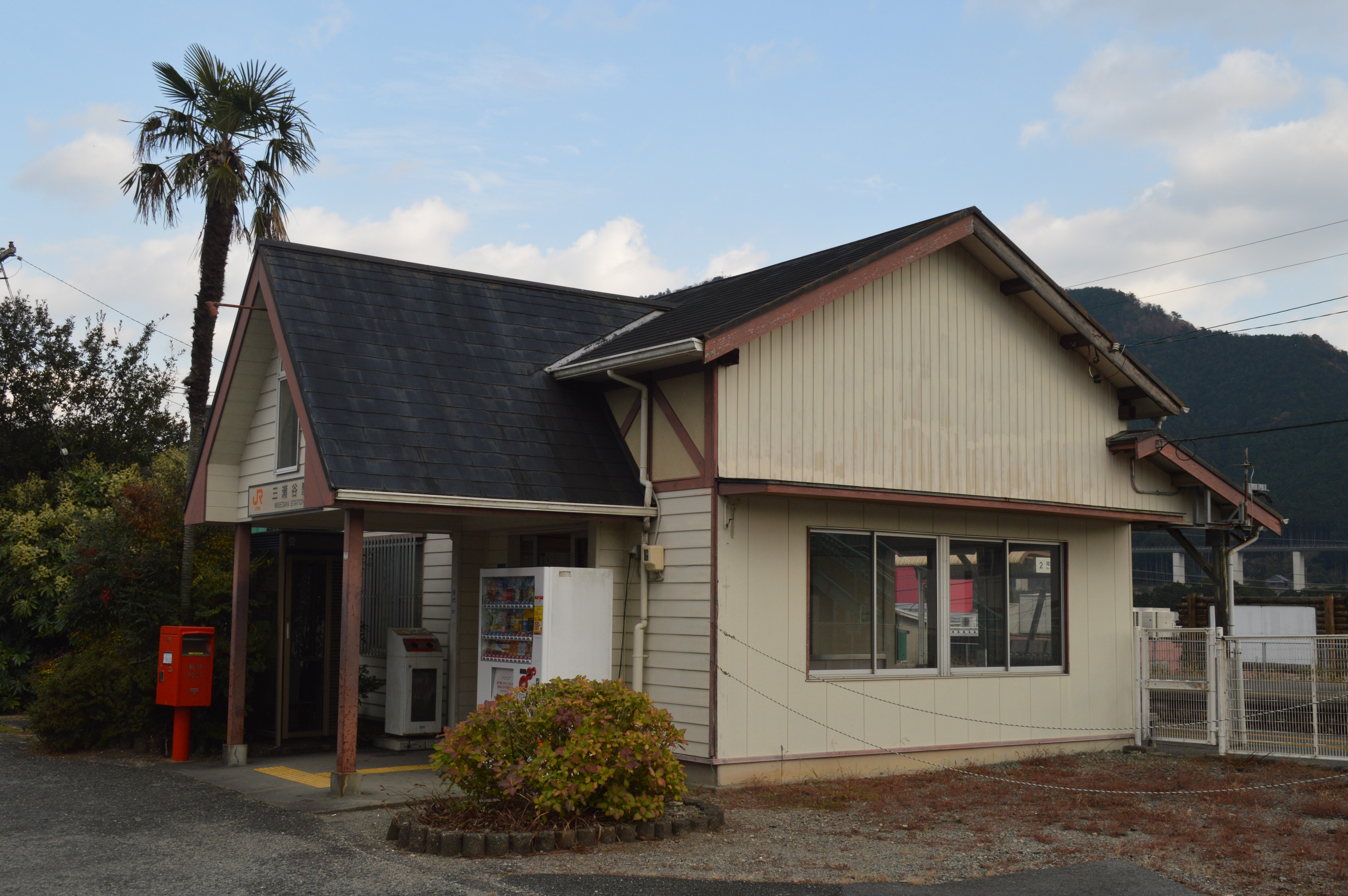
- Misedani Station, December 2020

General information
- Location: 654 Sahara, Ōdai-machi, Taki-gun, Mie-ken 519-2404; Japan
- Coordinates: 34.3950°N 136.4091°E
- Line: ■ Kisei Main Line
- Distance: 67.9 km from Kameyama
- Platforms: 1 side + 1 island platform
- Tracks: 3
- Connections: Bus terminal

Construction
- Structure type: Ground level

Other information
- Status: Unstaffed

History
- Opened: 15 August 1925

Passengers
- FY2019: 191 daily

Services
Preceding station	JR Central	Following station
Takihara towards Shingū	Kisei Main Line Local	Kawazoe towards Nagoya
Kii-Nagashima towards Shingū	Kisei Main Line Nanki	Taki towards Nagoya
Location
- Location within Mie Prefecture Location within Japan

Misedani Station (三瀬谷駅, Misedani-eki) is a railway station is a passenger railway station in located in the town of Ōdai, Taki District, Mie Prefecture, Japan, operated by Central Japan Railway Company (JR Tōkai).

== Lines ==
Misedani Station is served by the Kisei Main Line, and is located 67.9 km (42.2 mi) from the terminus of the line at Kameyama Station.

== Station layout ==
The station consists of a single side platform and a single island platform serving three tracks, connected by a footbridge. The wooden station building dates from the station's original construction. The station is unattended.

=== Platforms ===
1	■ Kisei Main Line	For Taki, Matsusaka, Kameyama, Yokkaichi and Nagoya
2,3	■ Kisei Main Line	For Owase, Shingū and Kii-Katsuura

== History ==
Misedani Station opened on 15 August 1925, as a station on the Japanese Government Railways (JGR) Kisei-East Line. The line was extended on to Takihara Station on 18 August 1926. The JGR became the Japan National Railways (JNR) after World War 2, and the line was renamed the Kisei Main Line on 15 July 1959. The station was absorbed into the JR Central network upon the privatization of the JNR on 1 April 1987. The station has been unattended since 1 April 2012.

== Passenger statistics ==
In fiscal 2019, the station was used by an average of 191 passengers daily (boarding passengers only).

== Surrounding area ==
- Miseya Dam
- Odai Municipal Miseya Elementary School
- Odai Municipal Odai Junior High School
- Odai Town Hall

== See also ==
- List of railway stations in Japan
