= Seiwa, Mie =

Dissolved municipality in Mie prefecture, Japan

Seiwa (勢和村, Seiwa-mura) was a village located in Taki District, Mie Prefecture, Japan.

== Population ==
As of 2003, the village had an estimated population of 5,182 and a density of 96.72 persons per km^{2}. The total area was 53.58 km^{2}.

== History ==
On January 1, 2006, Seiwa was merged into the expanded town of Taki and thus no longer exists as an independent municipality.
