= Miyagawa, Mie =

Dissolved municipality in Mie prefecture, Japan

Miyagawa (宮川村, Miyagawa-mura) was a village located in Taki District, Mie Prefecture, Japan.

As of 2003, the village had an estimated population of 3,953 and a density of 12.85 persons per km^{2}. The total area was 307.54 km^{2}.

On January 10, 2006 Miyagawa was merged into the expanded town of Ōdai and thus no longer exists as an independent municipality.
