= Taki, Mie =

Taki 多気町
- Town
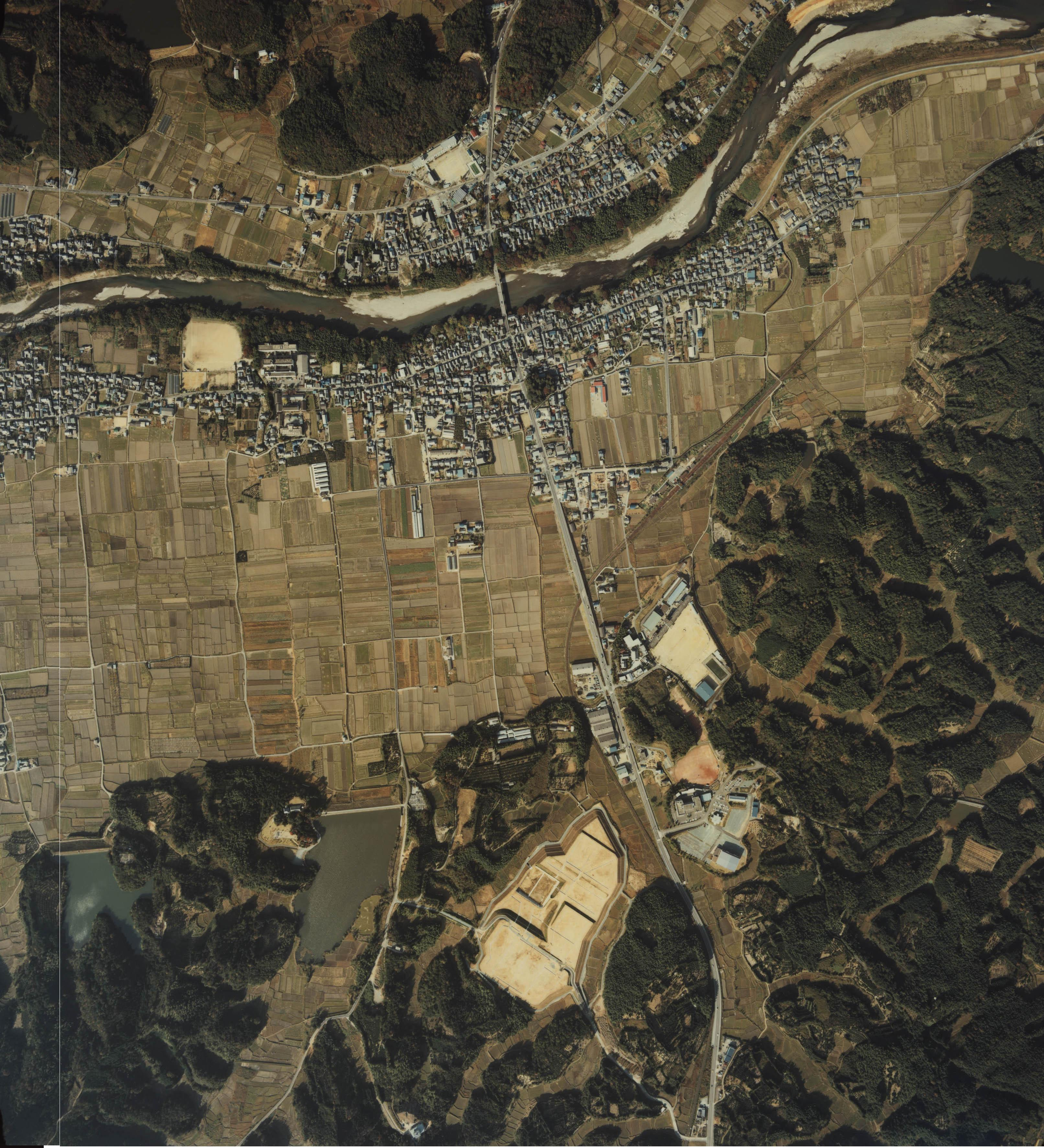
- Ōka, Taki

- Flag Seal

- Location of Taki in Mie Prefecture

- Coordinates: 34°29′46.1″N 136°32′46.3″E
- Country: Japan
- Region: Kansai
- Prefecture: Mie
- District: Taki

Government
  - - Mayor: Yukio Kubo

Area
  - Total: 103.06 km^{2} (39.79 sq mi)

Population (August 2021)
  - Total: 14,210
  - Density: 137.9/km^{2} (357.1/sq mi)
- Time zone: UTC+9 (Japan Standard Time)
- Symbols
  - Tree: Cinnamomum camphora
  - Flower: Lilium japonicum
  - Bird: Japanese white-eye
- Phone number: 0598-38-1111
- Address: 1600 Ōka, Taki-chō, Taki-gun, Mie-ken 519-2181
- Website: Official website

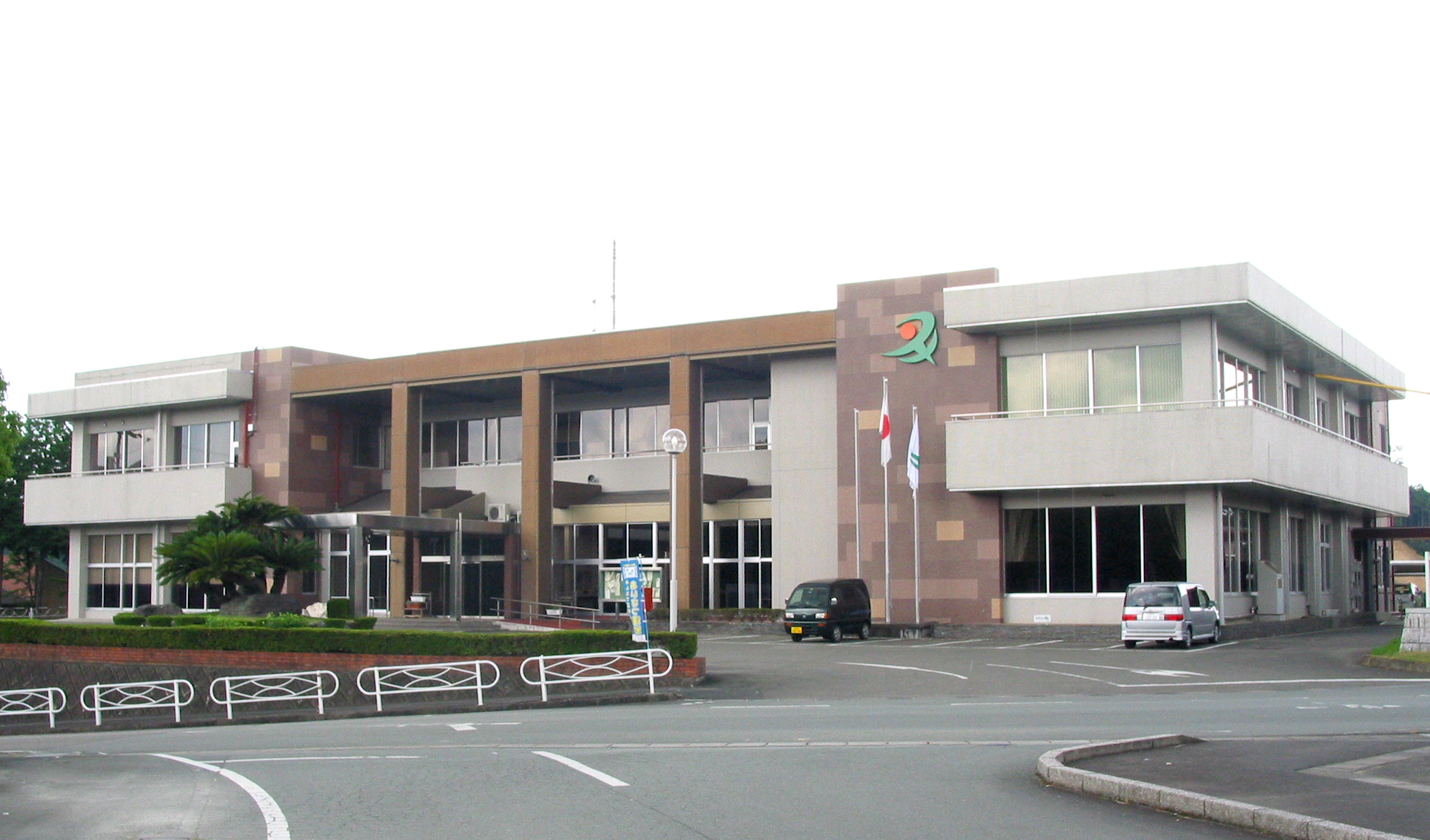
Taki Town Hall

Taki (多気町, Taki-chō) is a town located in Mie Prefecture, Japan. As of 1 August 2021, the town had an estimated population of 14,210 in 5,730 households and a population density of 140 persons per km^{2}. The total area of the town was 103.06 square kilometres (39.79 sq mi).

== Geography ==
Taki is an inland municipality located in eastern Kii Peninsula in central Mie Prefecture.

== Climate ==
Taki has a humid subtropical climate (Köppen Cfa) characterized by warm summers and cool winters with light to no snowfall. The average annual temperature in Taki is 14.9 °C. The average annual rainfall is 2015 mm with September as the wettest month. The temperatures are highest on average in August, at around 25.9 °C, and lowest in January, at around 4.2 °C.

== Demographics ==
The population of Taki has been declining slowly over the past 60 years.

Historical population
Year	Pop.	±%
1950	20,683	—
1960	18,537	−10.4%
1970	16,159	−12.8%
1980	16,054	−0.6%
1990	15,691	−2.3%
2000	16,149	+2.9%
2010	15,436	−4.4%

== History ==
The area of Take was part of ancient Ise Province. During the Edo period, it was mostly part of the holdings of Kii Domain. The village of Ōka (相可) was established on April 1, 1889, during the establishment of the modern municipalities system in the Meiji period. It was elevated to town status on June 20, 1919, and changed its name to Taki after merging of the neighboring villages of Sana and Tsuda, both in Taki District, on March 30, 1955. The village of Nishi-Tokida was annexed on April 15, 1959. On January 1, 2006, the village was merged into Taki.

== Government ==
Taki has a mayor-council form of government with a directly elected mayor and a unicameral city council of 12 members. Taki, collectively with the other municipalities of Watari District, contributes two members to the Mie Prefectural Assembly. In terms of national politics, the town is part of Mie 4th district of the lower house of the Diet of Japan.

== Economy ==
Taki serves as a commercial center for the surrounding region. The major industrial employer is Sharp Corporation. Noted agricultural products include Kaki persimmons and green tea.

== Education ==
Taki has five public elementary schools and two public middle schools operated by the town government, and one public high school operated by the Mie Prefectural Board of Education.

== Transportation ==
=== Railway ===
JR Tōkai – Kisei Main Line

- Taki - Ōka - Sana

JR Tōkai – Sangū Line

- Taki - Tokida

=== Highway ===
- Ise Expressway
- Kisei Expressway
- National Route 42
- National Route 386

== Local attractions ==
- Gokatsura Pond Furusato Village
- Jingu-ji
- Niu Jinja

== Sister cities ==
- Camas, Washington, United States

== Notable people from Taki ==
- Taito Kato, racing driver
- Katsuhito Nakazato, photographer
