= Kawazoe Station =

Railway station in Ōdai, Mie Prefecture, Japan

Kawazoe Station 川添駅
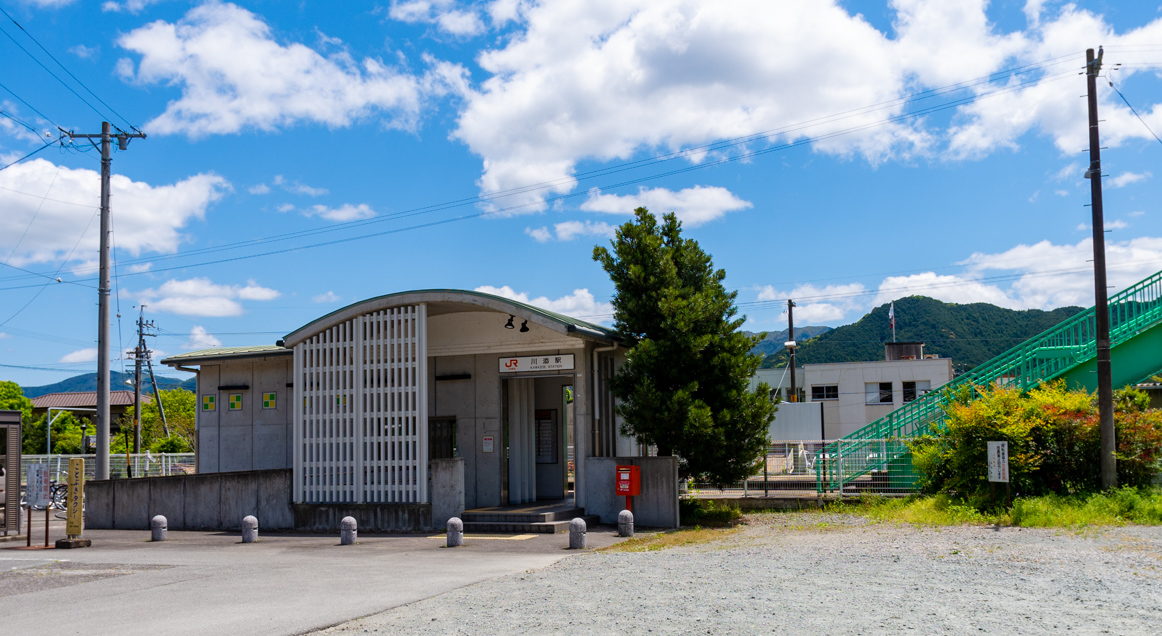
- Kawazoe Station, May 2013

General information
- Location: 281 Kamikusu, Ōdai-machi, Taki-gun, Mie-ken 519-2427; Japan
- Coordinates: 34.4198°N 136.4731°E
- Operator: JR Tōkai
- Line: ■ Kisei Main Line
- Distance: 60.8 km from Kameyama
- Platforms: 2 side platforms
- Tracks: 2
- Connections: Bus terminal

Construction
- Structure type: Ground level

Other information
- Status: Unstaffed

History
- Opened: 25 September 1923

Passengers
- FY2019: 77 daily

Services
Preceding station	JR Central	Following station
Misedani towards Shingū	Kisei Main Line Local	Tochihara towards Nagoya
Location
- Location within Mie Prefecture Location within Japan

Kawazoe Station (川添駅, Kawazoe-eki) is a passenger railway station in located in the town of Ōdai, Taki District, Mie Prefecture, Japan, operated by Central Japan Railway Company (JR Tōkai).

== Lines ==
Kawazoe Station is served by the Kisei Main Line, and is located 60.8 km (37.8 mi) from the terminus of the line at Kameyama Station.

== Station layout ==
The station consists of two opposed side platforms, connected by a footbridge. The station is unattended.

=== Platforms ===
1	■ Kisei Main Line	For Taki, Kameyama, Yokkaichi, Nagoya
2	■ Kisei Main Line	For Owase, Shingū, Kii-Katsuura

== History ==
Kawazoe Station opened on 25 September 1923 as a station on the Japanese Government Railways (JGR) Kisei-East Line. The line was extended on to Misedani Station on 15 August 1925. The JGR became the Japan National Railways (JNR) after World War II, and the line was renamed the Kisei Main Line on 15 July 1959. The station has been unattended since 21 December 1983. The station was absorbed into the JR Central network upon the privatization of the JNR on 1 April 1987. The station building was reconstructed in February 2002.

== Passenger statistics ==
In fiscal 2019, the station was used by an average of 77 passengers daily (boarding passengers only).

== Surrounding area ==
- Japan National Route 42
- Kawazoe Elementary School

== See also ==
- List of railway stations in Japan
