= Gokatsura Pond Furusato Village =

Park in Mie Prefecture, Japan

Coordinates: 34°28′0.0″N 136°33′16.4″E

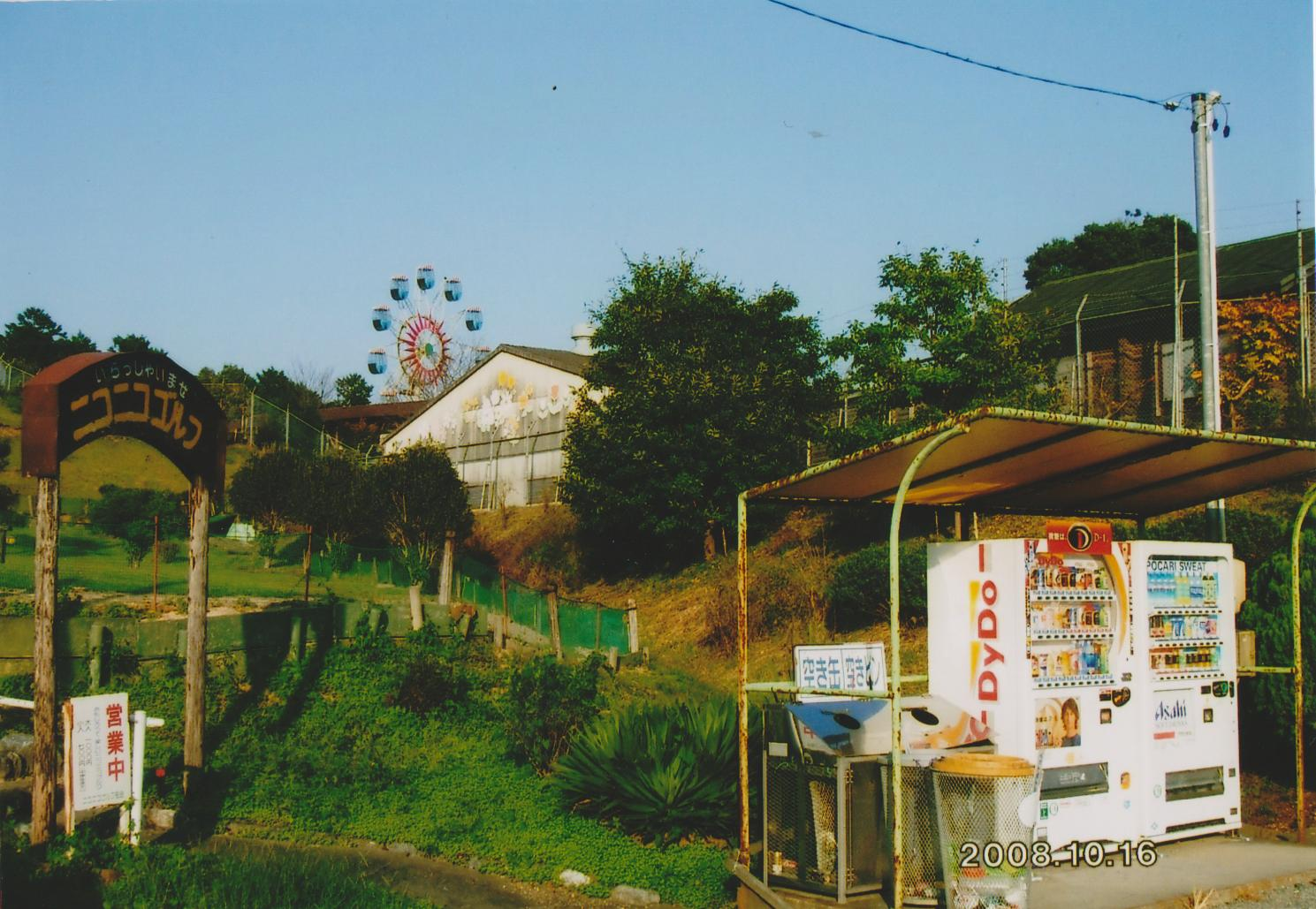
Gokatsura Pond Furusato Village

Gokatsura Pond Furusato Village (五桂池ふるさと村, Gokatsura Furusato-mura) is a park at 956 Gokatsura in Taki, Mie Prefecture, Japan. It was opened 1984.

== Gokatsura Pond ==
- It is a reservoir that was established in 1679. It is the largest pond (by area) within Mie Prefecture.

=== Data of the pond ===
- 4.5 km in surroundings
- Area 19.5 ha
- Amount of water contained 1,716,000 m³

=== History ===
- 1672－ The construction of the pond began in Gokatsura District by the order of the Kii Domain. Mitani Sōzan was the man put in charge of the construction project.
- 1679－The pond was completed after seven years. The number of people mobilized is thought to be around 152,000 people.
  - During construction, 25 resident families were displaced by the pond and were relocated to various locations.

=== Works about the pond ===
- The Story Of Gokatsura Pond "Kuchinashi-no-Hana"－ A work that portrayed the plight and struggle of the families relocated during the construction of the pond which was presented by the theatrical company "Shirotsubaki" in 2002.

== The main facilities ==
- Flower and petting-zoo plaza- An elephant had once been kept as an attraction. There is a Ferris wheel.
- Smiling golf
- Campground
- Barbecue plaza
- Japanese style restaurant- There is a footbath as part of the facilities.
- The Grandchildren's shop (まごの店 Mago no Mise)- A restaurant managed by the students of the nearby Oka high school culinary program. Students from this school have received great acclaim for their success in cooking competitions, both on the domestic and international level, and their reputation draws customers from as far as the neighboring prefectures with great frequency.
- The Grandma's shop (specialty shop)- It sells farm products.
- Ceramic art classroom
- Fruit picking- Persimmon, "Mikan" oranges, and strawberries can be harvested, depending on the season.

== History ==
- 1964-"Mikan" orange picking starts around Gokatsura pond.
- 1980-People who live in Gokatsura hold a symposium concerning the promotion of the area and addressing agricultural issues. Afterwards, a "Green, irregular committee" met 46 times, designing a project plan for establishing the Gokatsura Pond Furusato Village.
- 1984- Gokatsura Pond Furusato Village is opened. It drew around 160,000 people in its first year.
- 1989-Smiling golf opens.
- 1993-The petting-zoo plaza opens.
- 1999-The grandma's shop opens.
- 2005-The Grandchildren's shop is established.

== Management ==
- The government of Taki Town was set up administrative section based on "Ordinance concerning the installation and the management of Taki-cho Gokatsura pond Furusato Village", and it is managed by local citizens.

=== Business hours ===
- The flower and the petting-zoo plaza: 10 o'clock to 16 o'clock (Until 16:30, April–October)
- The Grandchildren's shop: As soon as it is sold out at 10:45
- Campground: 14:00 until 10:00am of the next day
- Conference room and related facilities: 17 o'clock from nine o'clock
- The fruit picking: 10 o'clock to 15 o'clock (Strawberry picking : until 16 o'clock)
- Additionally: 8 o'clock to 17 o'clock

=== Closed ===
- The second Tuesday of every month except August

== Access ==
- Railway
  - It is 34 minutes on foot from JR Kisei Line Sana Station.
  - About 15 minutes by taxi from JR Kisei Line and Sangu Line Taki Station.
- Bus
  - Get off Taki Citizen Bus Sana Line "Furusato-mura-mae".
    - It operates only on the Monday, Wednesday, and Friday.
- Car
  - About five minutes from Ise Expressway Seiwa-Taki interchange.

== Sources ==
- History: http://www.pref.mie.jp/muras/satoweb/satodukuri/22.pdf
- Management: Ordinance concerning installation and management of Taki-cho Gokatsura pond Furusato Village(No.167 of Taki-cho ordinance on March 22, 2006)
