= Typhoon Phyllis (1975) =

Pacific typhoon in 1975

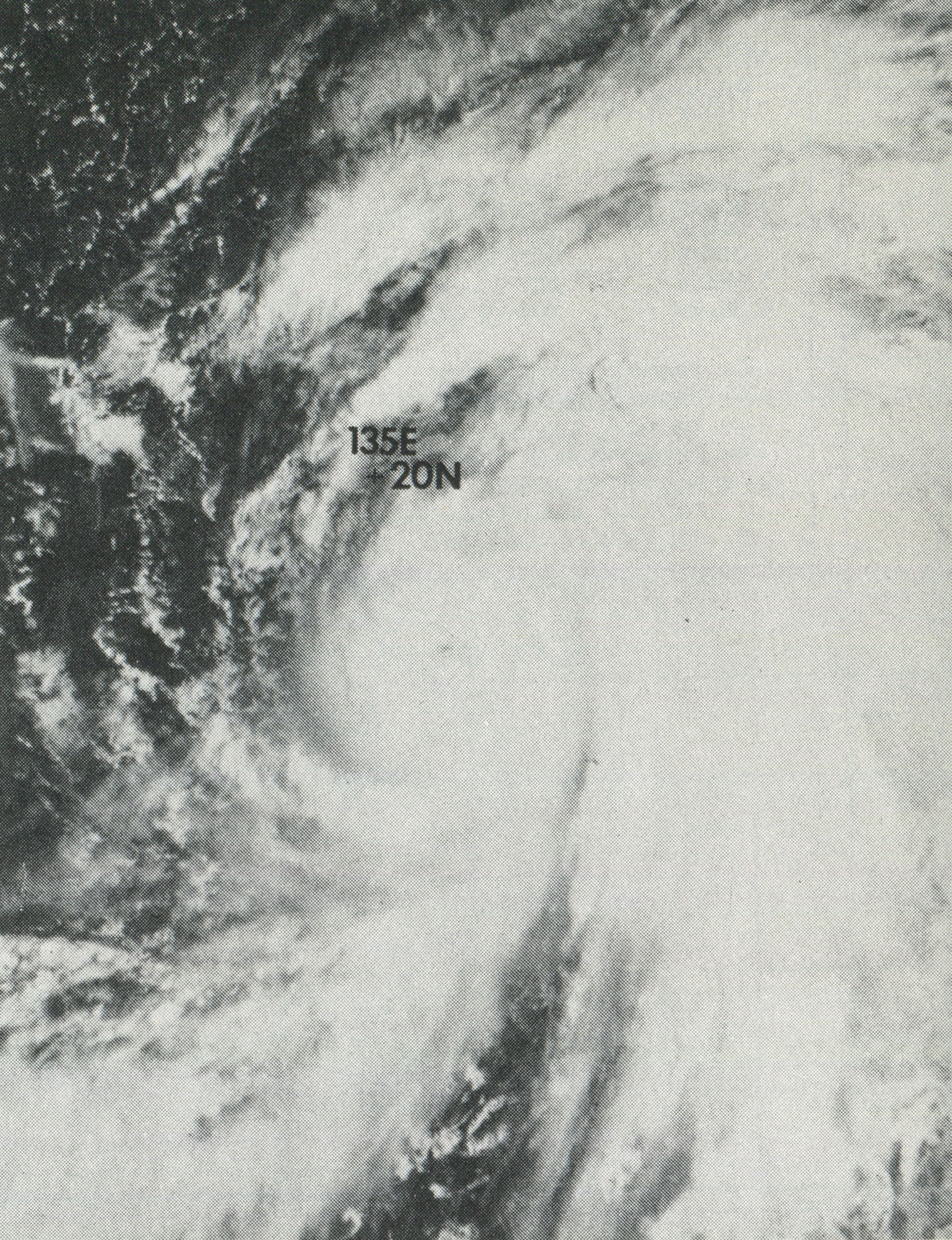
- Typhoon Phyllis late on August 13

Meteorological history
- Formed: August 11, 1975
- Dissipated: August 18, 1975

Unknown-strength storm
- 10-minute sustained (JMA)
- Lowest pressure: 920 hPa (mbar); 27.17 inHg

Category 4-equivalent typhoon
- 1-minute sustained (SSHWS/JTWC)
- Highest winds: 220 km/h (140 mph)
- Lowest pressure: 920 hPa (mbar); 27.17 inHg

Overall effects
- Fatalities: 88 total
- Damage: $37 million (1975 USD)
- Areas affected: Japan
- Part of the 1975 Pacific typhoon season

Typhoon Phyllis was one of seven tropical cyclones in 1975 to pass within range of the Japan Meteorological Agency's (JMA) radar surveillance. A tropical disturbance developed in the monsoon trough just west of Guam on August 11. The disturbance was classified as a tropical depression the next day. Tracking northward, the depression intensified into Tropical Storm Phyllis later on August 12. On the next day, Phyllis, after developing an eye, attained typhoon intensity. The typhoon accelerated north while rapidly intensifying, and on the evening of August 14, Phyllis reached its peak intensity of 225 km/h (140 mph). Typhoon Phyllis turned northwest, making landfall over Shikoku on August 17, with winds of 145 km/h (90 mph). Phyllis weakened to a tropical storm later the same day. Its remnants were last observed on August 20.

Phyllis, along with Typhoon Rita, were accountable for the bulk of tropical cyclone casualties in Japan during the 1975 Pacific typhoon season. From Phyllis alone, 60 people perished while 146 were injured on the island of Shikoku. There, at least 489 houses collapsed and 577 others were damaged. Throughout the country, 77 people were killed and 209 others sustained injured. A total of 129 landslides occurred while roads were cut in 106 locations and 23 dikes sustained damaged. A total of 50,222 homes were flooded and an additional 2,419 dwellings were demolished. Twelve ships and 12,712 ha (31,410 acres) of farmland received damaged. Damage was estimated at $37 million (1975 USD). In addition to effects on Japan, the typhoon also killed three people and left seven others missing in Taiwan. The outer fringes of the storm contributed to a heat wave that resulted in 24 fatalities.

== Meteorological history ==
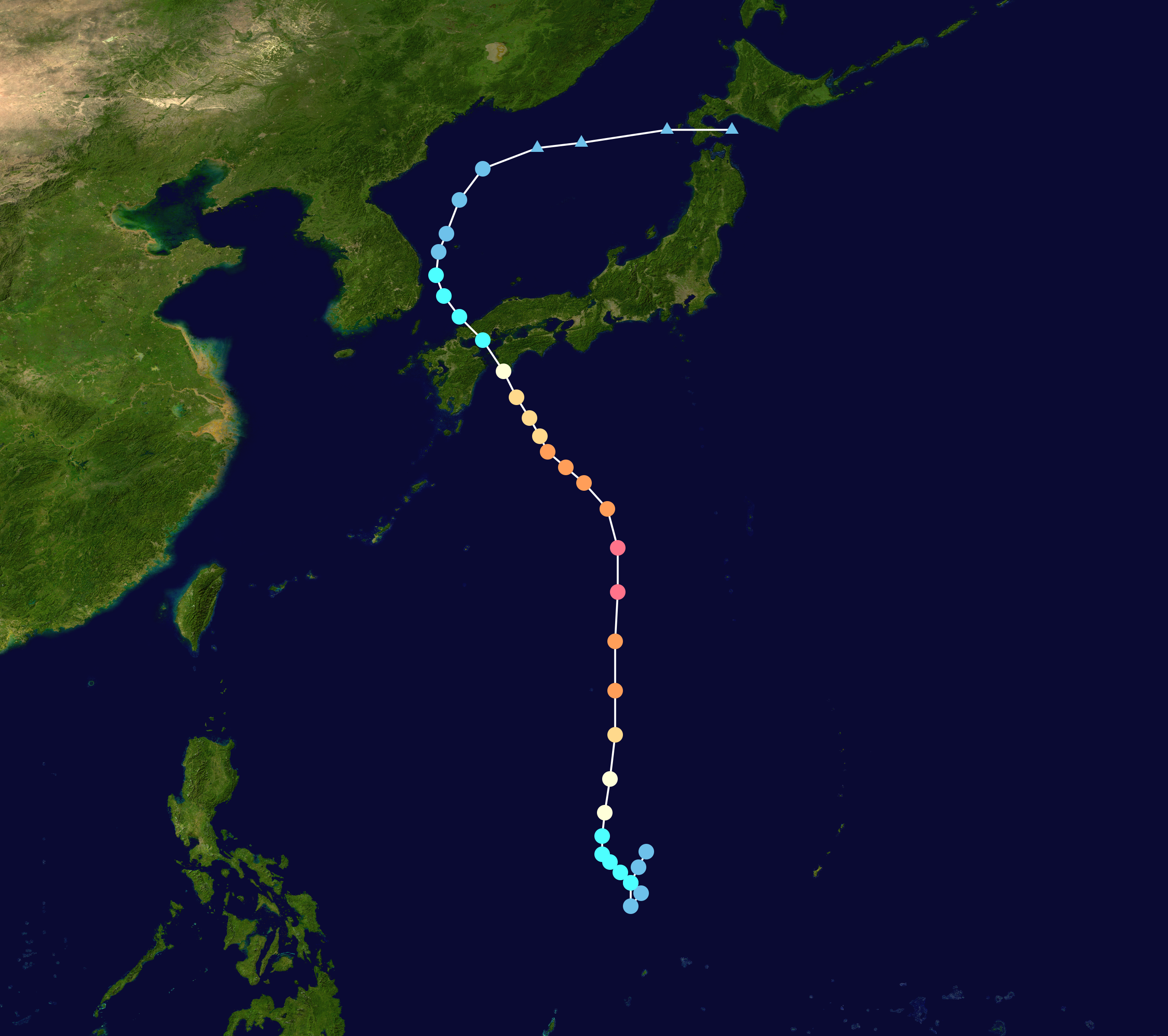
Map plotting the storm's track and intensity, according to the Saffir–Simpson scale Map key Saffir–Simpson scale Tropical depression (≤38 mph, ≤62 km/h) Tropical storm (39–73 mph, 63–118 km/h) Category 1 (74–95 mph, 119–153 km/h) Category 2 (96–110 mph, 154–177 km/h) Category 3 (111–129 mph, 178–208 km/h) Category 4 (130–156 mph, 209–251 km/h) Category 5 (≥157 mph, ≥252 km/h) Unknown Storm type Tropical cyclone Subtropical cyclone Extratropical cyclone, remnant low, tropical disturbance, or monsoon depression

During the first couple weeks of August 1975, the Western Pacific monsoonal trough extended from central China to Guam. Numerous surface circulations appeared in this trough as early as the August 8, and three days later, a tropical disturbance was spotted by the Joint Typhoon Warning Center (JTWC) some 705 km (440 mi) west-southwest of Guam. The first warning was issued on the morning of the August 12, with the JTWC designating it Tropical Depression 07. Due to the cyclone's proximity to the country, the Philippine Atmospheric, Geophysical and Astronomical Services Administration also monitored the storm and assigned it with the local name Etang. Despite a hurricane hunter aircraft finding multiple surface centers and an ill-defined upper-level center, the depression quickly strengthened into a tropical storm. Initially, the storm's low- and upper-level circulation were displaced by 200 km (125 mi), but on the morning of August 13, the centers had become vertically stacked. At 08:33 UTC, a hurricane hunter flight reported a closed eyewall 55 km (35 mi) in diameter. Based on aircraft reports of 115 km/h (70 mph) winds to the west-southwest of the center, Phyllis was believed to have obtained typhoon intensity midday on August 13.

By August 13, a mid-level ridge over China began to weaken while a ridge east of Japan intensified. As a result, Phyllis's forward speed accelerated as it tracked towards the north. In the 24 hours after being designated a typhoon, Phyllis entered a period of rapid deepening, attaining winds of 200 km/h (125 mph) winds at midday on August 14, which would make it an upper-end Category 3 hurricane on the United States-based Saffir-Simpson Hurricane Wind Scale (SSHWS). At 15:00 UTC, aircraft data measured a minimum barometric pressure of 920 mbar (27.2 inHg). Based on this, the JTWC estimated that the typhoon reached its maximum intensity of 225 km/h (140 mph), equal to Category 4 status on the SSHWS. The next day, the storm's forward motion briefly slowed as the ridge extended westward across Japan. After turning to the northwest, Phyllis once again accelerated, and on August 16, passed roughly 320 km (200 mi) southeast of Shikoku. The following morning, the typhoon moved onshore near the southwestern edge of Shikoku, with winds of 145 km/h (90 mph). The system weakened to a tropical storm at 06:00 UTC on August 17 over land, and a tropical depression 24 hours later. Late on August 18, Phyllis ceased to exist as a tropical cyclone, although the JMA estimated that Phyllis transitioned into an extratropical cyclone around this time. The agency continued to track the system until August 20 when it was meandering over the Sea of Japan. (Note: The Japan Meteorological Agency is presently the official Regional Specialized Meteorological Center for the western Pacific Ocean.)

== Impact ==
A minimum pressure of 970 mbar (28.6 inHg) was recorded in Shimizu. Nearby, in Tosashimizu, winds of 143 km/h (89 mph) were observed. Across Shikoku, the storm dropped 510 mm (20 in) of rainfall in some locations, with over 76 mm (3 in) of rainfall falling in an hour in parts of Kōchi Prefecture. In conjunction with Typhoon Rita, the two storms contributed to the majority of tropical cyclone casualties in Japan during the 1975 Pacific typhoon season. Overall, 77 people were killed and 209 others sustained injures. Train and ferry service were suspended between Shikoku and Hiroshima by up to three hours while All Nippon Airways and Toa Airways delayed 83 and 27 flights respectively. A total of 129 landslides were reported. Roads were cut in 106 places and 23 dikes were damaged. A total of 50,222 homes were flooded and an additional 2,419 houses were destroyed. Twelve ships were damaged, as well as 12,712 ha (31,410 acres) of farmland. Damage totaled $37 million.

Of the four main Japanese islands, the island of Shikoku, where the storm made landfall, suffered the worst damage from the typhoon. There were at least 60 fatalities and 146 injures, with an additional 12 individuals initially reported as missing. At least 489 houses collapsed, 577 others were damaged, and thousands of other dwellings were inundated. Most freeways across the island were closed and officials estimated it would take a week to be restored. Island-wide, 315,000 households lost power, with an additional 18,000 dwellings losing power on western Honshu. Kōchi Prefecture sustained the worst effects from the storm, where 21 people were killed, including one woman who was electrocuted. A 32-year-old man died in Matsuyama City after debris fell on him while driving. More than 1,000 homes were flooded in Tosa, Suzaki and Sagawa on Shikoku.

In addition to the effects on Japan, the outer rainbands of the typhoon dropped heavy rains in Taiwan, causing widespread damage. Three people were killed while seven others were rendered missing. A total of 3,000 people were displaced from their home. Numerous roads and railways were closed. Half the villages in Chiayi County were flooded with 1.8 m (6 ft) deep water.

While the typhoon's inner core bypassed South Korea, Phyllis dropped heavy rainfall across the country, peaking at 142 mm (5.6 in) in Daegwallyeong-myeon. Winds of 54 km/h (34 mph) and gusts of 84 km/h (52 mph) were recorded in Ulleungdo. A minimum pressure of 995.9 mbar (29.41 inHg) was observed at Busan. It also contributed to a heat wave that claimed 25 lives.

== See also ==
- Typhoon Thad (1981)
