= Typhoon Rita (1975) =

Pacific typhoon in 1975

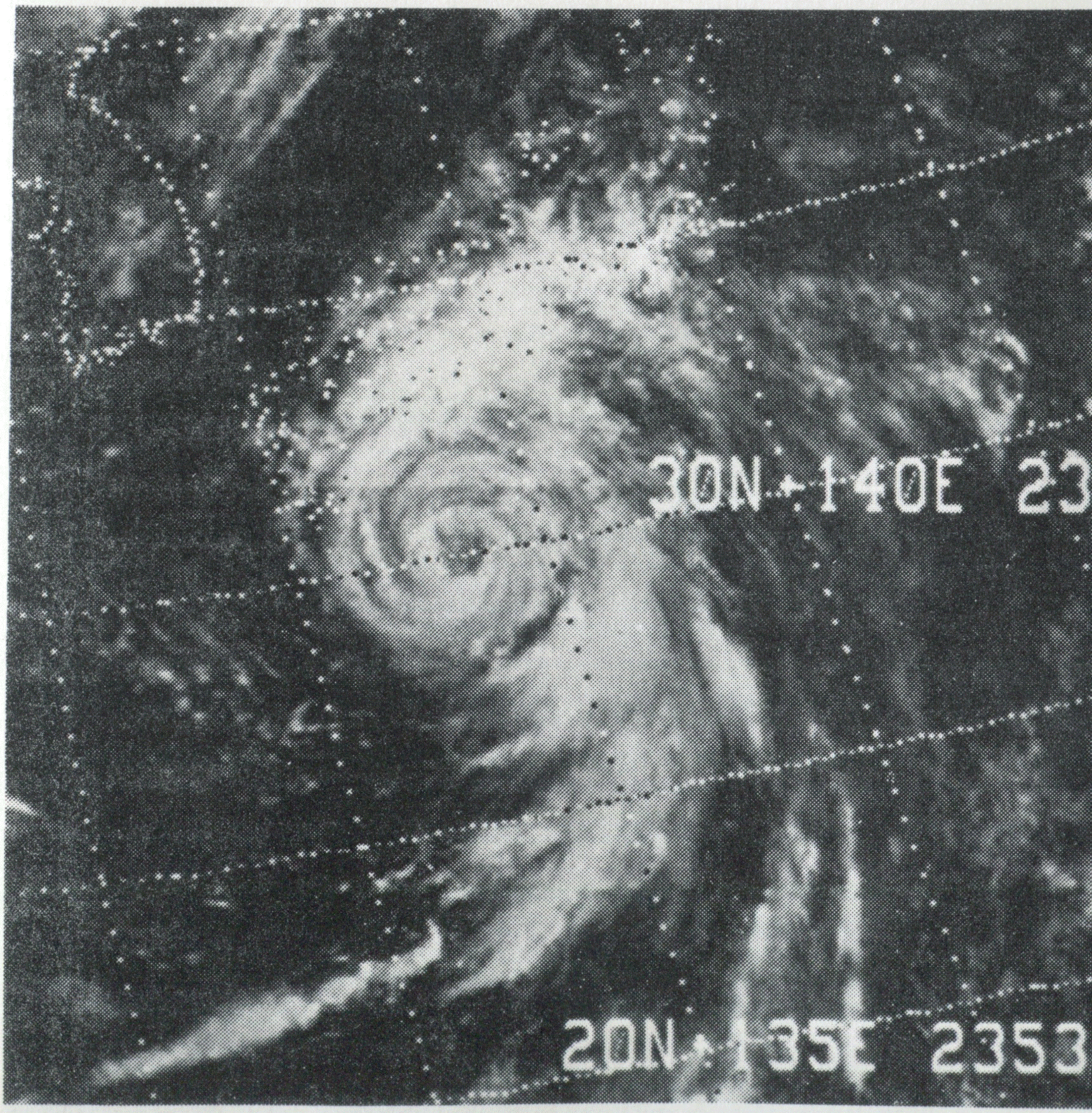
- Typhoon Rita near peak intensity

Meteorological history
- Formed: August 9, 1975
- Extratropical: August 24, 1975
- Dissipated: August 25, 1975

Typhoon
- 10-minute sustained (JMA)
- Lowest pressure: 965 hPa (mbar); 28.50 inHg

Category 1-equivalent typhoon
- 1-minute sustained (SSHWS/JTWC)
- Highest winds: 150 km/h (90 mph)
- Lowest pressure: 966 hPa (mbar); 28.53 inHg

Overall effects
- Fatalities: 33 total
- Damage: $114 million
- Areas affected: Japan
- IBTrACS
- Part of the 1975 Pacific typhoon season

Typhoon Rita was the most damaging typhoon to affect northern Japan since 1965. A tropical depression developed on August 9, 1975 over the South China Sea. The depression initially meandered offshore Taiwan, but after turning west, it was upgraded into a tropical storm on August 19, only to turn back to the east. While growing considerably in size, Rita strengthened into a typhoon during the afternoon hours of the August 21. Rita then accelerated to the north-northeast in response to a shortwave trough. Midday on August 22, the typhoon reached its peak intensity, with winds of 145 km/h (90 mph) and a minimum barometric pressure of 965 mbar (28.5 inHg). That evening, the typhoon weakened slightly before making landfall 55 km (34 mi) west of Osaka, with winds of 130 km/h (81 mph). Quickly crossing central and northern Honshu, Rita veered slightly northward before weakening into a tropical storm early on August 23. On the next day, Rita merged with a cold front before transiting into an extratropical cyclone.

Heavy rains caused landslides and flash flooding that was responsible for extensive crop and property damage across Japan. The typhoon contributed to the worst flooding in Hokkaido in ten years. Overall, 33 people were killed and 51 others were injured, including 36 seriously. Fifty-six trains and seventy-five flights were cancelled; ferry services were also disrupted by the storm. Greater than 100 landslides occurred while over 40 bridges were inundated. A total of 48,832 houses sustained flooded and 3,000 dwellings were damaged. Moreover, 177 houses were destroyed, resulting in almost 2,800 homeless families. Twenty-eight ships, as well as 80,033 hectares (197,770 acres) of farmland, suffered damage. Nationwide, the typhoon inflicted 34 billion yen (US$114 million) worth of damage. (Note: All currencies are converted from Japanese yen to United States Dollars using this with an exchange rate of the year 1975.) (Note: All damage totals are in 1975 values of their respective currencies.)

== Meteorological history ==
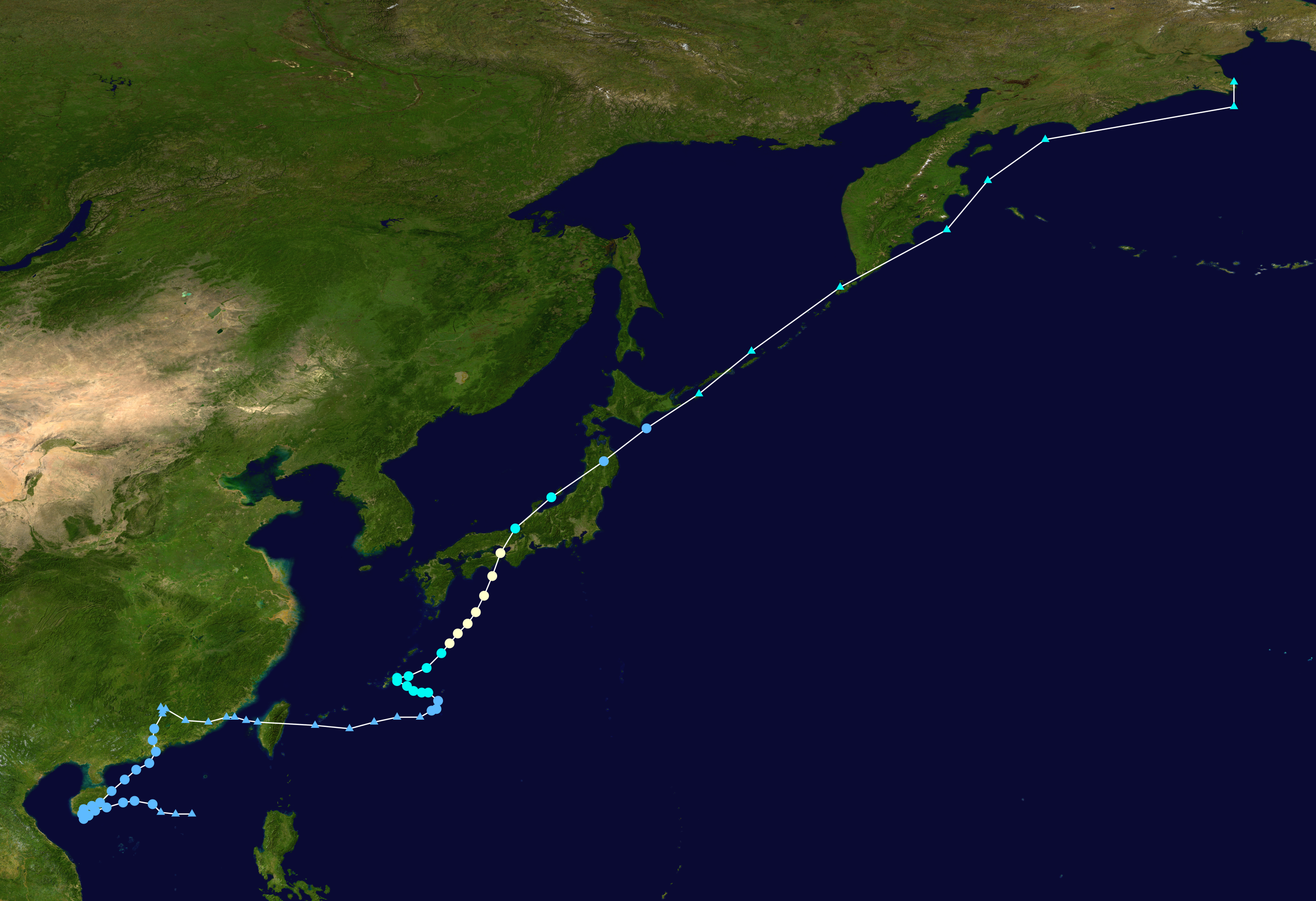
Map plotting the storm's track and intensity, according to the Saffir–Simpson scale Map key Saffir–Simpson scale Tropical depression (≤38 mph, ≤62 km/h) Tropical storm (39–73 mph, 63–118 km/h) Category 1 (74–95 mph, 119–153 km/h) Category 2 (96–110 mph, 154–177 km/h) Category 3 (111–129 mph, 178–208 km/h) Category 4 (130–156 mph, 209–251 km/h) Category 5 (≥157 mph, ≥252 km/h) Unknown Storm type Tropical cyclone Subtropical cyclone Extratropical cyclone, remnant low, tropical disturbance, or monsoon depression

On August 9, 1975, the Japan Meteorological Agency (JMA) designated a tropical depression in the South China Sea. (Note: The Japan Meteorological Agency is the official Regional Specialized Meteorological Center for the western Pacific Ocean.) (Note: Wind estimates from the JMA and most other basins throughout the world are sustained over 10 minutes, while estimates from the United States-based Joint Typhoon Warning Center are sustained over 1 minute. 10-minute winds are about 1.14 times the amount of 1-minute winds.) The depression did not initially develop further as it meandered offshore Taiwan and passed through the Ryuku Islands. The Joint Typhoon Warning Center (JTWC) estimated that a monsoon depression formed over 320 km (200 mi) southeast of Okinawa on August 18. Drifting first east then westward, Rita was upgraded into a tropical storm the next day by both the JTWC and JMA, based on Hurricane Hunter reports of storm-force winds. Due to a weakening subtropical ridge east of Japan, the storm reversed back to an easterly direction near the northern tip of Okinawa. Rita strengthened into a typhoon, the sixth of the season, on the afternoon of the August 21 as the storm grew significantly in size, especially in the eastern semicircle.

After becoming a typhoon, Rita accelerated gradually in a north-northeasterly direction as a shortwave trough approached. Around this time, Rita became the second of seven tropical cyclones that season to be observed by Japanese radar. Midday on August 21, the typhoon reached its peak intensity, with winds of 145 km/h (90 mph) and a minimum barometric pressure of 965 mbar (28.5 inHg). That evening, the typhoon weakened slightly before making landfall 55 km (35 mi) west of Osaka, with winds of 130 km/h (80 mph). At the time of landfall, Rita exhibited a 70 to 115 km (45 to 70 mi) wide eye. Quickly crossing central Honshu, Rita veered slightly northward and accelerated to speeds of 55 to 65 km/h (35 to 40 mph) ahead of an advancing cold front in the Sea of Japan. First tracking along the western coast, Rita crossed the northern portion of Honshu before emerging back into the Pacific. At 00:00 UTC on August 23, Rita was downgraded to a tropical storm, and transitioned into an extratropical cyclone 24 hours later, after merging with a frontal zone south of Hokkaido. However, its remnants were tracked through August 25.

== Impact ==
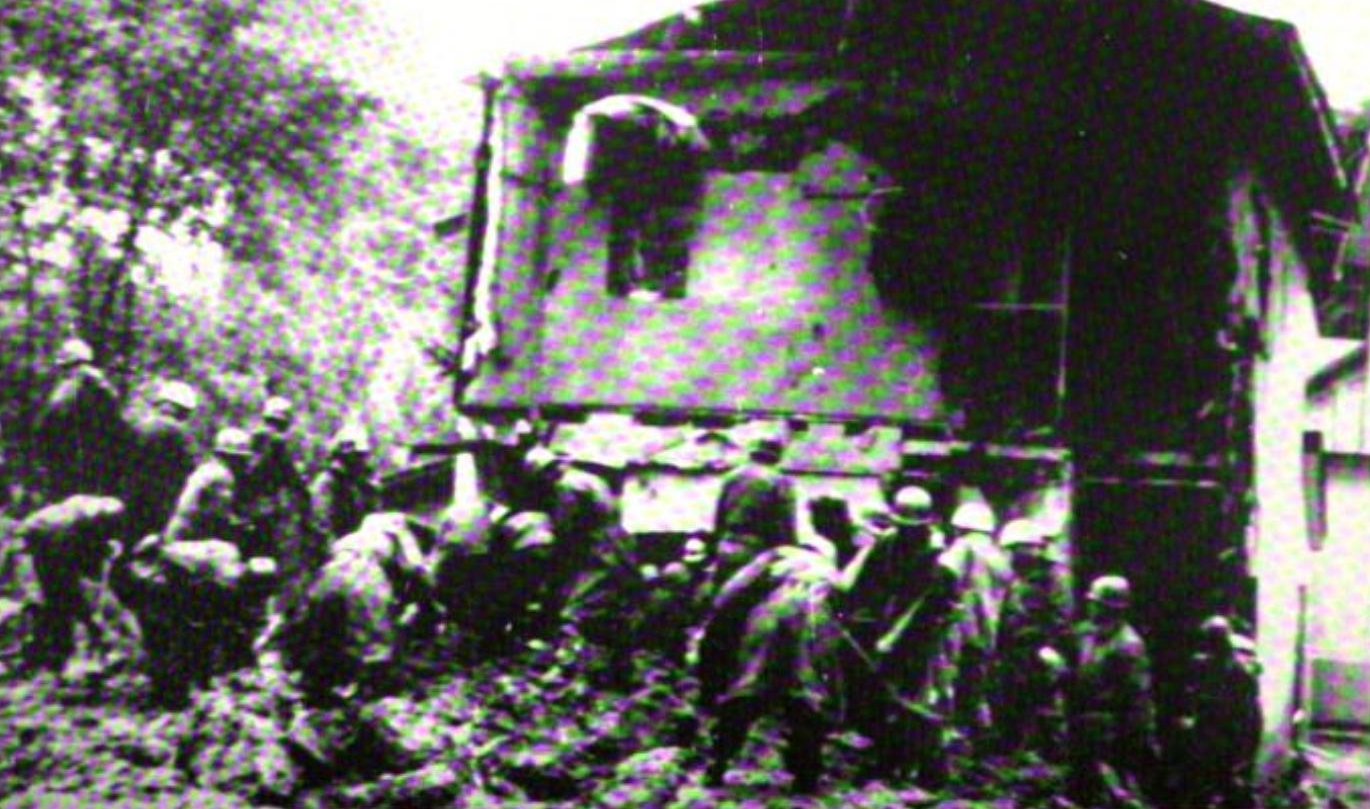
Damage from Typhoon Rita.

Prior to the arrival of Rita, thousands of people were evacuated, including 16,000 from four coastal villages. Early on August 20, a minimum pressure of 983.4 mbar (29.0 inHg) was observed at Kadena Air Base, although winds were comparatively light with a peak gust of 69 km/h (43 mph) at 05:14 UTC. Prior to landfall, Rita's large eye moved directly over Murotomisaki, where sustained winds of 145 km/h (90 mph) along with a minimum pressure of 966.3 mbar (28.5 inHg) were measured. The storm lashed the southern coast of Honshu with heavy rains and strong wind, with wind gusts near 105 km/h (65 mph) recorded at Yokota Air Base between 03:00 and 04:00 on August 23. Many locations across the country received at least 300 mm (12 in) of precipitation, with 710 mm (28 in) falling in Osaka City during a 13-hour time period. Along west facing beaches, a storm surge of up to 2.0 m (6.4 ft) was recorded.

Heavy rains caused landslides and flash flooding, which were responsible for extensive crop and property damage. Throughout the island of Shikoku, 14 people were killed. In Mishima, two landslides claimed a total of four lives. Another landslide in Tsukude killed a 53-year-old man, a 78-year-old women, and a 14-year-old girl. Hokkaido suffered the most severe flooding in 10 years. Several major rivers on the island overflowed their banks, leaving towns inundated and isolated. Around 1,200 residents in Tsukigata were evacuated after a nearby river overflowed its banks.

Combined with Typhoon Phyllis, the two storms contributed to the majority of tropical cyclone casualties in Japan during the 1975 Pacific typhoon season. From Rita alone, 33 people perished and 51 others were injured, 36 seriously. Fifty-six trains were cancelled, with all bullet trains between Tokyo and Hakata delayed for nine hours. Seventy-five flights were called off while ferry services were also disrupted by the storm. More than 100 landslides occurred. Over 40 bridges were inundated. A total of 48,832 homes were flooded and 3,000 dwellings were damaged. Furthermore, 177 houses were destroyed, resulting in almost 2,800 homeless families. Twenty-eight ships were damaged, as well as 80,033 ha (197,770 acres) of farmland. Nationwide, the typhoon was responsible 34 billion yen (US$114 million) in damage.

== See also ==
- Other typhoons named Rita
- Similar damaging Japan typhoons
  - Typhoon Thad (1981)
  - Typhoon Fran
