= Ōdai =

Ōdai 大台町
- Town
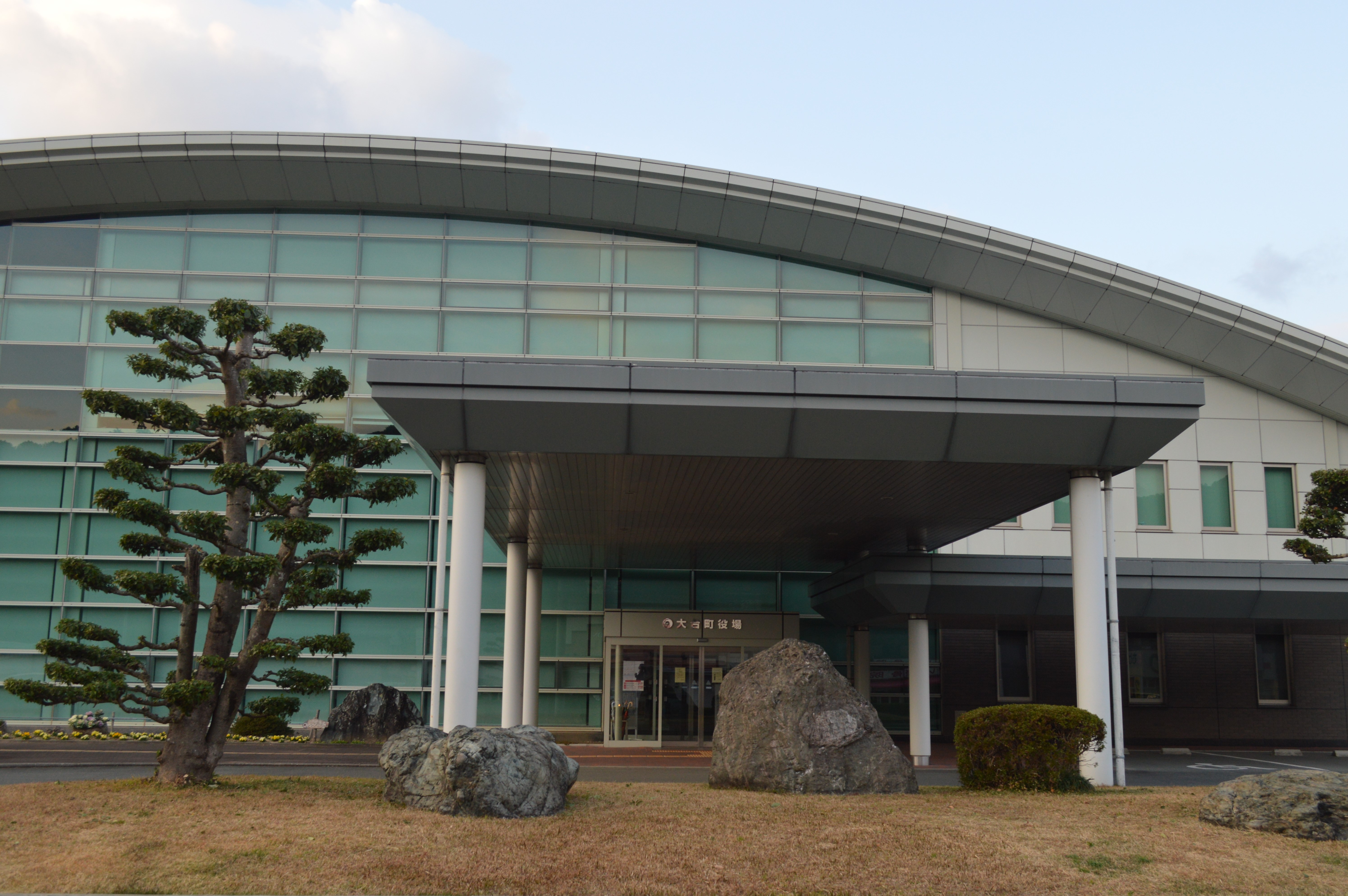
- Ōdai town hall

- Flag Emblem

- Location of Ōdai in Mie Prefecture

- Coordinates: 34°24′N 136°24′E
- Country: Japan
- Region: Kansai
- Prefecture: Mie
- District: Taki

Area
  - Total: 362.86 km^{2} (140.10 sq mi)

Population (June 30, 2021)
  - Total: 8,847
  - Density: 24.38/km^{2} (63.15/sq mi)
- Time zone: UTC+9 (Japan Standard Time)
- Phone number: 0598-82-3781
- Address: 750 Sahara, Ōdai-chō, Taki-gun, Mie-ken 519-2404
- Website: Official website

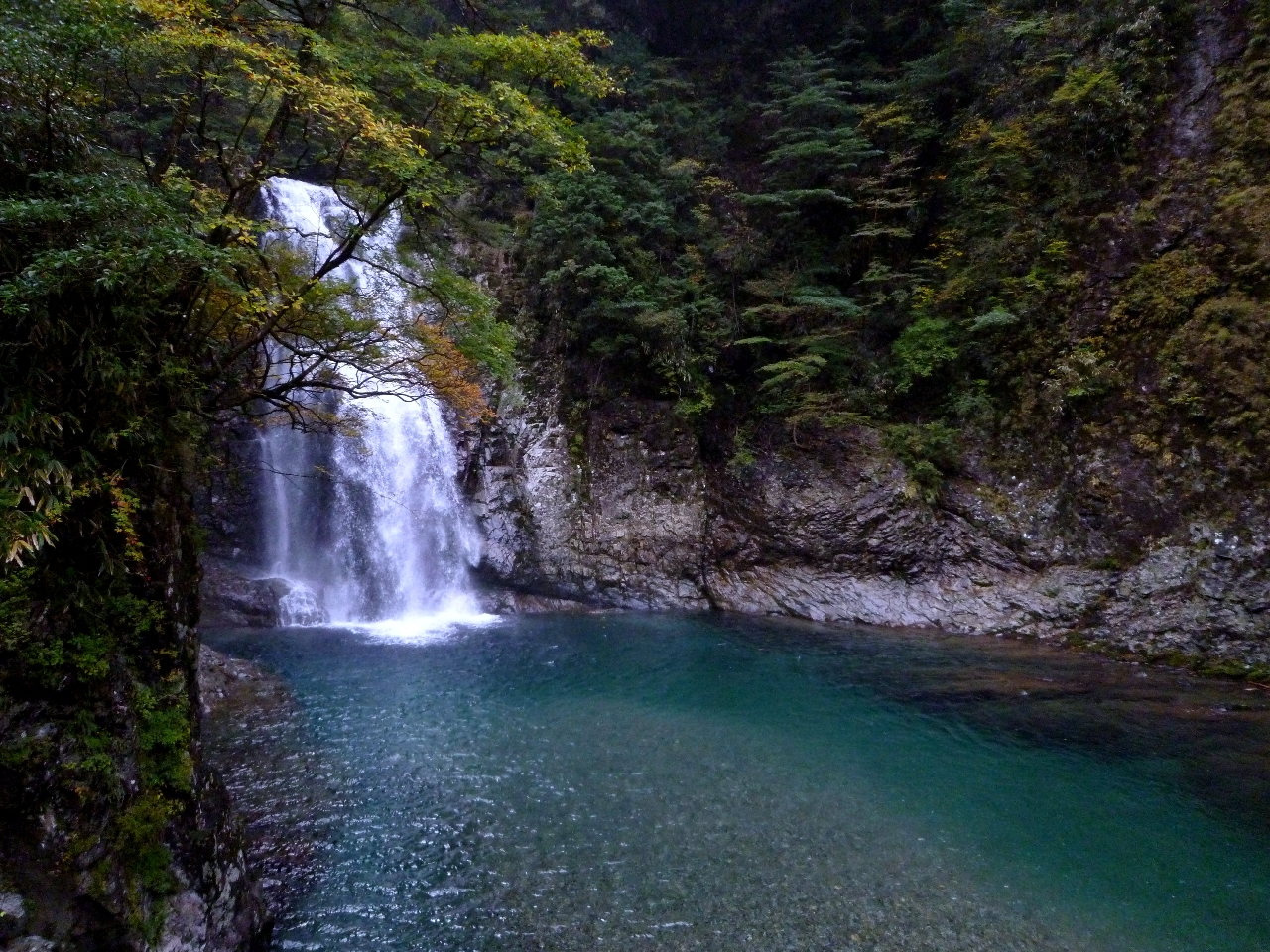
Ōsugidani Ravine

Ōdai (大台町, Ōdai-chō) is a town located in Mie Prefecture, Japan. As of 30 June 2021, the town had an estimated population of 8,847 in 4,125 households and a population density of 24 persons per km^{2}. The total area of the town was 362.86 square kilometres (140.10 sq mi).

== Geography ==
Ōdai is located in southeastern Kii Peninsula in central Mie Prefecture. An inland municipality, Ōdai extends almost the width of Mie Prefecture from east to west, but is narrow north to south.

== Climate ==
Ōdai has a humid subtropical climate (Köppen Cfa) characterized by warm summers and cool winters with light to no snowfall. The average annual temperature in Ōdai is 14.2 °C. The average annual rainfall is 2,683 mm with September the wettest month. The temperatures are highest on average in August, at around 24.7 °C, and lowest in January, at around 3.7 °C.

== Demographics ==
The population of Ōdai has decreased steadily over the past 60 years and is now less than it was a century ago.

Historical population
Year	Pop.	±%
1920	14,816	—
1930	14,657	−1.1%
1940	14,841	+1.3%
1950	18,444	+24.3%
1960	17,399	−5.7%
1970	13,754	−20.9%
1980	13,172	−4.2%
1990	12,144	−7.8%
2000	11,399	−6.1%
2010	10,419	−8.6%

== History ==
The area of present-day Ōdai was part of the ancient Ise Province, but was mostly part of Kii Domain under the Edo period Tokugawa shogunate. The village of Misedani in Taki District, Mie Prefecture, was established with the creation of the modern municipalities system on April 1, 1889. It was raised to town status in 1953. The town of Ōdai was established on September 30, 1956, by the merger Misedani with the village of Kawazoe. On January 1, 2006, the last remaining village in Mie Prefecture, Miyagawa Village, merged with Ōdai.

== Government ==
Ōdai has a mayor-council form of government with a directly elected mayor and a unicameral city council of 11 members. Ōdai contributes two members to the Mie Prefectural Assembly. In terms of national politics, the town is part of Mie 4th district of the lower house of the Diet of Japan.

== Economy ==
Ōdai serves as a commercial center for the surrounding region.

== Education ==
Ōdai has four public elementary schools and two public middle schools operated by the town government. The town has one public high school operated by the Mie Prefectural Board of Education.

== Transportation ==
=== Railway ===
JR Tōkai – Kisei Main Line

- Tochihara - Kawazoe - Misedani - Takihara

=== Highway ===
- Kisei Expressway
- National Route 42
- National Route 422

== Local attractions ==
- Mount Ōdaigahara
