= Taki District, Mie =

District in Mie prefecture, Japan

Coordinates: 34.371°N 136.33°E

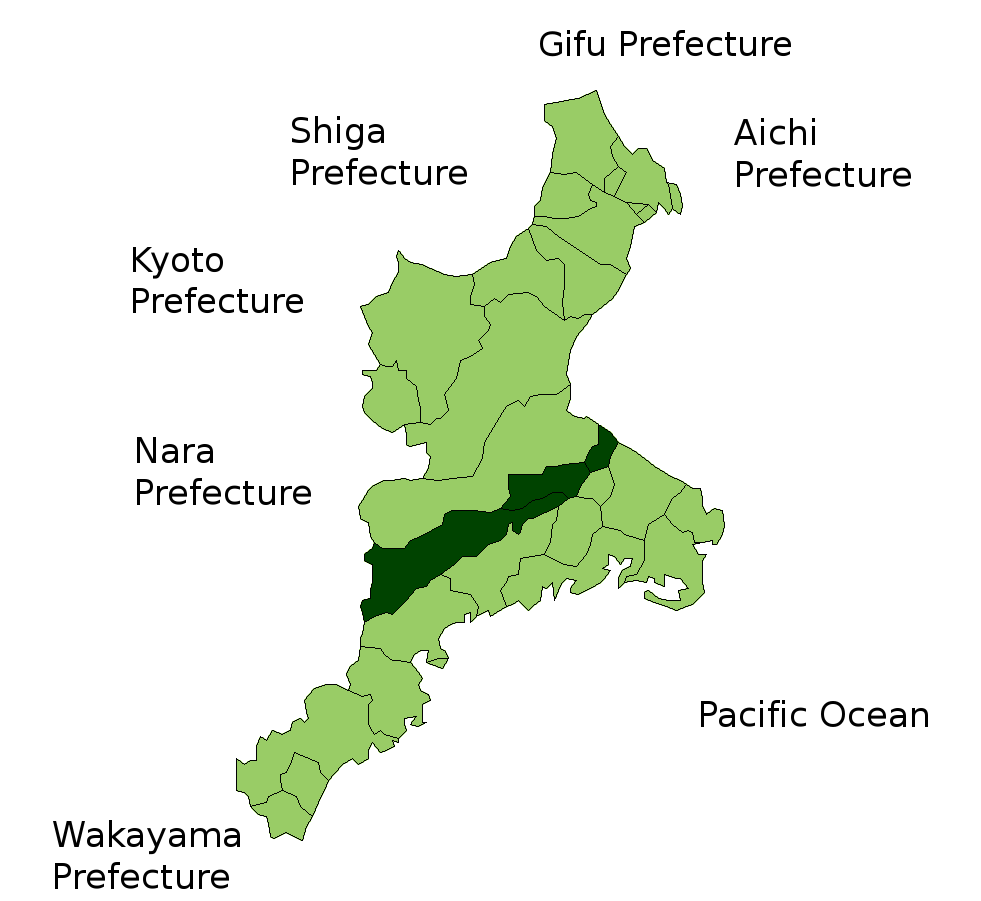
Map of modern Taki District as of 2012

Taki District (多気郡, Taki-gun) is a rural district located in Mie Prefecture, Japan.

As of 2012, the district has an estimated population of 40,084 and a population density of 94.8 persons per km^{2}. The total area of Taki is 507.03 km^{2}.

== History ==
Taki District was one of the traditional counties of former Ise Province. Modern Taki District was established within Mie Prefecture on April 1, 1889 during the Meiji period establishment of municipalities, and was organized into 17 villages. The village of Ōka was elevated to town status on June 20, 1919, followed by Ōyodo on February 1, 1924.

Ōka was renamed Taki in 1955, and Ōyodo was renamed Sanwa the same year. In 1953, the village of Misedani was raised to town status, becoming Ōdai on September 30, 1956. Sanwa became the town of Meiwa in 1958. On January 1, 2006 the village of Seiwa merged into the town of Taki and on January 10, 2006 the village of Miyagawa merged into the town of Ōdai.
